= JSAT (satellite constellation) =

Japanese commercial satellite constellation

The JSAT constellation is a communication and broadcasting satellite constellation formerly operated by JSAT Corporation and currently by SKY Perfect JSAT Group. It has become the most important commercial constellation in Japan, and fifth in the world. It has practically amalgamated all private satellite operators in Japan, with only B-SAT left as a local competitor.

JSAT began in 1985, with the opening by the Government of Japan, of the communication markets in Japan and the founding of Japan Communications Satellite Company, Satellite Japan Corporation, Space Communications Corporation. It grew by own investment, mergers and acquisitions of the parent companies. As of August 2016, it includes the fleets of three previously mentioned companies, Horizons Satellite and NTT DoCoMo and the DSN military network.

== Constellations ==
SKY Perfect JSAT Group has gone through some significant mergers and acquisition and the JSAT constellation has grown accordingly. It has practically amalgamated all private satellite operators in Japan, with only B-SAT left as a competitor. Since these mergers were the result of the opening of the communication markets in Japan, that growth does not mean that it has monopolised the segment, but rather is the go-to company for space segment operation.

During its history, the JSAT network has absorbed a series of fleets and constellations. Some are core constellations, some are operation for third parties and some are joint ventures. As of August 2016, the current configuration of the JSAT fleet is this:

=== JCSAT ===
With the opening of the Japanese satellite communications market to private investment, Japan Communications Satellite Company (JCSAT) and Satellite Japan Corporation were founded in 1985. In June of the same year, JCSAT awarded an order to Hughes Space and Communications for two identical satellites, JCSAT-1 and JCSAT-2, based on the spin-stabilized HS-393 satellite bus. JCSAT-1, the first commercial Japanese communications satellite, was successfully launched aboard an Ariane-44LP on 6 March 1989. Its brother (JCSAT-2), was launched aboard a Commercial Titan III on 1 January 1990.

On 1993, Japan Communications Satellite Company and Satellite Japan Corporation merged to form Japan Satellite Systems Inc. (JCSAT). That same year, JCSAT ordered JCSAT-3, a third satellite from Hughes, using the HS-601 platform. In 1995, JCSAT obtained a license for international service, and thus became a regional operator. On 29 August 1995, an Atlas IIAS successfully launched JCSAT-3 into orbit. In December 1995, JCSAT ordered a fourth satellite, JCSAT-4, with the same manufacturer and platform as JCSAT-3. On 17 February 1997, JCSAT-4 was renamed JCSAT-R after being put in orbit by an Atlas IIAS.

In June 1996, JCSAT ordered JCSAT-5, another HS-601-based satellite, and the twin JCSAT-6 in December 1996, from Hughes.

By September 1997, both JCSAT and Space Communications Corporation (SCC) had requested the 110° East position. The Japanese government made both companies share the 110° E position, and thus both made a joint order in November 1998 for N-SAT-110 from Lockheed Martin. It was also called JCSAT-7 by JCSAT, and Superbird-5 by SCC. On 2 December 1998, an Ariane-44P successfully orbited JCSAT-5, which became JCSAT-1B. JSAT-6 was rechristened as JCSAT-4A after successfully being injected in its transfer orbit by an Atlas IIAS on 16 February 1999.

In 2000, the company name was changed to JSAT Corporation, and was listed on the First Section of the Tokyo Stock Exchange. In April of that year, JSAT ordered JCSAT-8 from Boeing Satellite Development Center (which had acquired the HS-601 business from Hughes), to replace JCSAT-2 at the 154° East slot. N-SAT-110 was successfully launched on 6 October 2000 by an Ariane 42L, at which point it was renamed JCSAT 110 and Superbird-D.

An Ariane 44L successfully launched JCSAT-8 on 28 March 2002 from Centre Spatial Guyanais. Once successfully deployed, it was renamed JCSAT-2A.

JSAT switched satellite suppliers again and, on 30 April 2003, awarded an order for JCSAT-9 to Lockheed Martin Space Systems and its A2100AXS platform. A hybrid satellite with 20 C-band, 20 K_{u}-band, and 1 S-band transponders, it was expected for launch in 2005 for the 132° East slot. A year later, on 20 April 2004, JSAT ordered a second satellite from Lockheed, JCSAT-10. Based on the A2100AX platform, it would have a C-band and K_{u}-band payload and was expected to occupy the 128° East slot after its planned 2006 launch.

On 3 October 2005, JSAT ordered a third A2100-based satellite from Lockheed Martin, JCSAT-11. It would also have a C-band and K_{u}-band payload, and would be launched in 2007 to act as a backup for the whole JSAT fleet.

During 2006, JSAT successfully launched two satellites. On 12 April 2006, a Zenit-3SL successfully orbited JCSAT-9 from a platform on the Pacific Ocean. JSAT had leased some transponders to NTT DoCoMo to be used as N-STAR d. Once in its 132° East orbital position, it was known as JCSAT 5A and N-STAR d. Then, on 11 October 2006, an Ariane 5 ECA launched JCSAT-10 along Syracuse-3B into a transfer orbit. Upon successful deployment at 128° East longitude, it was renamed JCSAT-3A.

On 1 May 2007, Intelsat put the order for the STAR-2-based Intelsat 15 satellite to Orbital Sciences. In a business deal, five of its 22 K_{u}-band transponders were sold to JSAT. Under this arrangement, Intelsat-15 became JCSAT-85 for the JSAT payload, since it was to be positioned at the 85° E longitude.

The almost 19-year streak of successful JCSAT launches was ended when a Proton-M/Briz-M failed to orbit JCSAT-11 on 5 September 2007. A damaged pyro firing cable on the interstage truss prevented the second stage from controlling its direction, and the rocket and its payload crashed into the Kazakhstan steppes. Being lucky in misfortune, JCSAT-11 was simply an on-orbit backup and thus it had no operational impact on the fleet. The same day of the launch failure, JSAT placed an order with Lockheed Martin for an identical replacement, JCSAT-12, for launch in 2009.

On September 18, 2007, JSAT announced an agreement with B-SAT to jointly procure an hybrid broadcast and communication satellite. Thanks to a decision of the Japanese government that effectively lifted a ban on such mixed satellites, both companies would share a spacecraft to act as backup of JCSAT-110 on the 110°East slot. Named JCSAT-110R and BSAT-3c, it was to be launched in 2011, and it would be managed by B-SAT. On September 19, 2007, they closed a deal with Arianespace for a launch slot with an Ariane 5 for its launch.

In March 2008, SCC became a wholly owned subsidiary of SKY Perfect JSAT Group. At the SKY Perfect JSAT board meeting of August 6, 2008, it was resolved to merge SKY Perfect Communications, JSAT Corporation and Space Communications Corporation. This consolidated the Superbird fleet into JSAT and created the fifth satellite operator in the world at the time.

On December 15, 2008, JSAT and B-SAT placed a joint order with Lockheed for another A2100-based satellite. Designated JCSAT-110R by JSAT and BSAT-3c by B-SAT, it was to be launched by an Ariane 5 in the second quarter of 2011. The satellite would have two 12 K_{u} band payloads, one for each of the owners.

On April 16, 2009, JSAT made its seventh order for an A2100-based satellite from Lockheed, JCSAT-13. It would feature 44 K_{u} band transponders with two steerable antennas for on-orbit reconfiguration. It was to be launched in 2013 for the 124°East slot where it would replace JCSAT-4A. The next day, April 17, Arianespace announced that they had secured the contract to launch JCSAT-13 on an Ariane 5 ECA.

On August 21, 2009, an Ariane 5 ECA successfully orbited JCSAT-12 along with Optus D3. Upon reaching orbit, JCSAT-12 was renamed JCSAT-RA, which functions as an on-orbit backup. On November 30 of the same year, a Zenit-3SLB successfully launched Intelsat-15/JCSAT-85.

On August 6, 2011, JCSAT-110R/BSAT-3c and its launch companion Astra 1N were successfully put in orbit by an Ariane 5 ECA. On May 15, 2012, again on an Ariane 5 ECA, JCSAT-13 and Vinasat-2 were launched into orbit. After the launch success, JCAST-13 was renamed JCSAT-4B. After reaching the 124°East, it was commissioned into service on July 10, replacing JCSAT-4A.

On June 11, 2013, SSL announced that it had been awarded a contract by JSAT to manufacture JCSAT-14. It would be a 10 kW satellite with 26 C band and 18 K_{u} band transponders with 15 years of expected life. It was scheduled for launch in 2015. On January 10, 2014, JSAT announced that it had signed a launch service contract with SpaceX for the launch of JCSAT-14 aboard a Falcon 9 rocket. The expected launch date was the second half of 2015.

In April 2014, SSL announced that it had been awarded a contract by JSAT to manufacture two satellites: JCSAT-15, a 10-kW satellite to replace N-SAT-110 plus expansion capability, and JCSAT-16, an 8.5-kW satellite with K_{u} band and K_{a} band payload to be used as a backup to the existing fleet. On September 8, Arianespace announced that it had signed a launch service contract for the launch of JCSAT-15 aboard an Ariane 5 ECA rocket. And on September 10, 2014, JSAT announced that it had signed a second launch service contract with SpaceX for the launch of JCSAT-16 aboard a Falcon 9 rocket.

The June 28, 2015 failure of Falcon 9 Flight 19 meant a delay of at least six months on the Falcon 9 launches. On February 3, 2016, Lockheed Martin announced that it had been awarded an order for JCSAT-17 for delivery in 2019. Because of its configurable S band payload, it would be able to redirect capacity to concentrate on disaster relief efforts or other high-volume events.

On May 5, 2016, at 05:21 UTC, the Falcon 9 successfully launched JSCAT-14 to a geosynchronous transfer orbit. The rocket's first stage subsequently landed on an autonomous spaceport drone ship. The next day, SSL announced that the satellite had deployed the solar arrays, was in full control, and was performing orbital maneuvers to reach its operational position. Renamed JCSAT-2B, it was on track to reach its 154°East orbital slot.

At the scheduled August 14 at 05:26 UTC, SpaceX successfully launched the JCSAT-16 satellite into orbit on a Falcon 9 rocket. While JCSAT-16 was supposed to serve as on-orbit backup at the 124° East longitude position, it will be rushed into service at the 162°East position to replace Superbird-B2, a satellite past its design life. Originally Superbird-8 was supposed to replace Superbird-B2, but a mishap during transport to the launch site in March 2016 meant that it would be delayed between one and two years.

=== Space Communications Corporation ===
Mitsubishi logo. SCC was owned by Mitsubishi.

Space Communications Corporation (SCC) was founded in 1985, the same year as the original companies that later formed JSAT. On 1986 SCC ordered four spacecraft from Space Systems/Loral, Superbird-A, Superbird-B, Superbird-A1 and Superbird-B1. SCC was related to the Mitsubishi Group, and has been a part of their keiretsu.

On June 5, 1989 Superbird-A, the second private communications satellite of Japan was launched aboard an Ariane 44L along DFS Kopernikus-1. On February 22, 1990 Superbird-B was lost when the Ariane 44LP that should have orbited it along BS-2X failed during launch. Superbird-B1 was completed in just 19 months and successfully launched on February 26, 1992 also aboard an Ariane 44L. The last of the initial batch, Superbird-A1 was launched on December 1 of the same year, thus completing the first phase of deployment of the SCC fleet.

SCC switched satellite suppliers and on 1995 ordered a satellite from Boeing, Superbird-C. On July 28, 1997, Superbird-C was orbited by an Atlas IIAS.

On 1995, SCC obtained a license to offer communication services in the international market and thus became a regional operator. On April 6, 1998, SCC ordered a second satellite from Boeing, Superbird-4. On February 18, 2000 Superbird-4 was orbited by an Ariane 44LP, at which point it was renamed as Superbird-B2.

By September 1997, both JSAT and SCC had requested the 110°East position. The Japanese government made them share that position and thus both made in November 1998 a joint order for N-SAT-110 from Lockheed Martin. It was also called JCSAT-7 by JSAT and Superbird-5 by SCC, but was later rechristened as JCSAT 110 and Superbird-D once it was on orbit. N-SAT-110 was successfully launched on October 6, 2000 by an Ariane 42L.

In September 2001 SCC ordered Superbird-6 from Boeing. It was launched on April 16, 2004 by an Atlas IIAS that injected in the supersynchronous orbit specified by the satellite manufacturer, at which point it was named Superbird-A2. But the orbit analysis had failed to take into consideration the influence of the Moon at such high apogees and the perigee started to drop dangerously fast. Most of its propellant had to be spent and the solar panels suffered damage that reduced the power production. It was never commissioned into service.

On November 1, 2005, SCC orders its first satellite to be built in Japan, the Superbird-7 by MELCO. It was successfully launched along AMC-21 by an Ariane 5 ECA on August 14, 2008, at which time it was renamed as Superbird-C2.

In March 2008, SCC becomes a fully owned subsidiary of SKY Perfect JSAT Group. On the SKY Perfect JSAT board meeting of August 6, 2008, it was resolved to merge SKY Perfect Communications, JSAT Corporation and Space Communications Corporation. The merger would see SKY Perfect absorb JSAT and SCC and both legacy companies dissolved. This consolidated the Superbird fleet into JSAT and created the fifth satellite operator in the world at the time.

=== N-Star ===
N-Star was created as a joint venture between JSAT, NTT, NTT Communications and NTT DoCoMo for the supply of these latter two WIDESTAR satellite telephone and data packet service. JSAT would handle the satellite side of business and NTT DoCoMo would operate the payload.

Two identical satellites were ordered on 1992 from Space Systems Loral, N-STAR a and N-STAR b, for 1995 and 1996 on orbit delivery. They would be "switchboards in the sky" having S band, C band, K_{a} band and K_{u} band payload.

N-STAR a was successfully launched aboard an Ariane 44P on August 29, 1995. Its twin, N-STAR b, launched on February 5, 1996, also aboard an Ariane 44P. The satellite telephone service was operational in March 1996. In March 2000, the packet communications service was introduced. In March 2000, JSAT received the NTT Communications interest in the N-STAR a and N-STAR b.

In October 1999, N-STAR c was ordered by NTT DoCoMo from Lockheed Martin and Orbital Sciences Corporation. Orbital would supply the spacecraft and procure launch services and Lockheed would deliver the payload an act a main contractor. The satellite was successfully launched on July 5, 2002 along Stellat 5 on an Ariane 5G.

In August 2003 the JSAT acquired the NTT DoCoMo interest on N-STAR a and N-STAR b, whom then leased them back.

JSAT ordered JCSAT-9 from Lockheed Martin, and in May 2003 leased some transponders to NTT DoCoMo to be used as N-STAR d. JCSAT-9 successfully launched on April 12, 2006 aboard a Zenit-3SL and was rechristened JCSAT-5A. It enabled the new service WIDESTAR II and deprecated the original N-STAR a and N-STAR b.

During 2010, SKY Perfect JSAT Corporation acquires N-STAR c, completing the transfer of NTT orbital assets and management to JSAT.

=== DSN military network ===
JSAT along NEC, NTT Com and Maeda Corporation formed a joint venture called DSN Corporation. On January 15, 2013, DSN Corporation announced that it had closed a contract with the Ministry of Defense to execute the "Program to Upgrade and Operate X-Band Satellite Communications Functions, etc". The contract was a private finance initiative, where private funds, management and technical capabilities were used to upgrade and operate the Japanese military X band satellite network.

With the new venture in place, the DSN Corporation took on manufacture and launch of two satellites plus making upgrades to the ground control station network. DSN is to operate, manage and maintain the facilities and equipment from fiscal years 2015 to 2030, at a total estimated program cost of ¥122,074,026,613.

The 2013 plan called for the launch of the first satellite in December 2015, with a start of operations in March 2016 and a termination of operations on April 2030. In the event, the 2015 launch was delayed by two years. The second satellite was expected to launch in January 2017, starting operations in March 2017. The program and the operations of the second satellite were expected by March 2031.

JSATs role is the procurement and general management of the satellites. The first satellite, DSN-1, is actually an additional payload on one of JSAT's own satellites, Superbird-8. The second satellite, DSN-2 is a dedicated spacecraft.

In April 2014, JSAT announced that it had placed an order with MELCO to procure a DS2000 model for the Superbird-8 satellite, intended to replace Superbird-B2 and be positioned on the 162°East orbital slot.

In May 2016, JSAT experience a satellite air transportation mishap where a dislodged tarpaulin had blocked a bleed valve on a satellite transport container and the Superbird-8 spacecraft suffered over pressurization damage. This occurred as the completed satellite was on a flight to the launch site; JSAT observed container deformation detected upon landing. The mishap was expected to delay the satellite launch about two years.

=== Horizons Satellite ===
Horizons Satellite was originally an equal share joint venture with PanAmSat. It ordered its first satellite, Horizons-1/Galaxy 13 from Boeing in middle 2001. It was a 4 t (4.4 tons) spacecraft with 24 C band and 24 K_{u} band transponders. It had a 10 kW power generation capacity and 15 years of expected life. It was successfully launched on October 1, 2003 aboard a Zenit-3SL rocket from the Ocean Odyssey platform in the Pacific.

On August 30, 2005, Orbital Sciences announced that Horizons Satellite had ordered a small satellite based on the STAR-2 platform, Horizons-2, for the PanAmSat licensed orbital slot at 74°West. It would carry 20 Ku band transponders, generate 3.5 kW of power, weight around 2.3 t (2.5 tons) and was expected to be launched in 2007.

The late 2005 take over of PanAmSat by Intelsat, did not diminished the relationship and, in fact, strengthened the alliance. On December 21, 2007, Horizons Satellite used an Ariane 5 rocket to launch Horizons-2. And, outside of the Horizons Satellite, JCSAT and Intelsat launched the joint satellite Intelsat 15/JCSAT-85 on November 30, 2009 aboard a Zenit-3SLB.

On November 4, 2015, JSAT and Intelsat made a joined statement that they would add a new member to their Horizons joint venture. The satellite, called Horizons 3e, would be based on the Intelsat Epic^{NG} platform, featuring an optimized C band and high throughput K_{u} band payload it would offer mobility and broadband connectivity services in the Asia-Pacific region. It was expected to use the 169°East orbital slot and launch by the second half of 2018.

This would be the fourth joint satellite, along with the other two Horizons Satellite spacecraft, Horizons-1 and Horizons-2 and the separately co-owned JCSAT-85/Intelsat 15. Since this would be an investment within Horizons, it would not be considered a capital expenditure of the parent companies.

== Satellite fleet ==
JSAT usually has a name for the satellites orders, and once commissioned in orbit they get rechristened to a new, definitive name. This is a list of the historical satellite projects.

Project	Name	Bus	Payload	Order	Launch	Launch Vehicle	Launch Result	Launch Mass	Status	Remarks
JCSAT-1	JCSAT-1	HS-393	32 K_{u} band	1985	1989-03-06	Ariane 44LP	Success	2,280 kg (5,030 lb)	Decommissioned	First commercial Japanese satellite.
Superbird-1	Superbird-A	SSL 1300	23 K_{u} band, 3 K_{a} band and 2 X band	1986	1989-06-05	Ariane 44L	Success	2,800 kg (6,200 lb)	Decommissioned	Launch with DFS Kopernikus-1.
JCSAT-2	JCSAT-2	HS-393	32 K_{u} band	1985	1990-01-01	Commercial Titan III	Success	2,280 kg (5,030 lb)	Decommissioned	Launched with Skynet 4A.
Superbird-2	Superbird-B	SSL 1300	23 K_{u} band, 3 K_{a} band and 2 X band	1986	1990-02-22	Ariane 44L	Failure	2,800 kg (6,200 lb)	Decommissioned	Launched with BS-2X. Launch failure.
Superbird-B1	Superbird-B1	SSL 1300	23 K_{u} band, 3 K_{a} band and 2 X band	1986	1992-02-26	Ariane 44L	Success	2,800 kg (6,200 lb)	Decommissioned	Launched with Arabsat-1C.
Superbird-A1	Superbird-A1	SSL 1300	23 K_{u} band, 3 K_{a} band and 2 X band	1986	1992-12-01	Ariane 42P	Success	2,800 kg (6,200 lb)	Decommissioned	
JCSAT-3	JCSAT-3	HS-601	12 C band and 28 K_{u} band	1993	1995-08-29	Atlas IIAS	Success	3,105 kg (6,845 lb)	Decommissioned	
N-STAR a	N-STAR a	SSL 1300	11 K_{a} band, 8 K_{u} band, 6 C band and 4 S band	1992	1995-08-29	Ariane 44P	Success	3,400 kg (7,500 lb)	Decommissioned	Acquired from NTT Communications in March 2000.
N-STAR b	N-STAR b	SSL 1300	11 K_{a} band, 8 K_{u} band, 6 C band and 4 S band	1992	1996-02-05	Ariane 44P	Success	3,400 kg (7,500 lb)	Decommissioned	Acquired from NTT Communications in March 2000.
JCSAT-4	JCSAT-R	HS-601	12 C band and 28 K_{u} band	1995	1997-02-17	Atlas IIAS	Success	3,105 kg (6,845 lb)	Decommissioned	Sold as Intelsat 26.
Superbird-C	Superbird-C	HS-601	24 K_{u} band	1995	1997-07-28	Atlas IIAS	Success	3,130 kg (6,900 lb)	Decommissioned	
JCSAT-5	JCSAT-1B	HS-601	32 K_{u} band	1996	1997-12-02	Ariane 42P	Success	2,982 kg (6,574 lb)	Operational at 150°E	Launched with Equator-S. Replacement of JCSAT-1.
JCSAT-6	JCSAT-4A	HS-601	32 K_{u} band	1996	1999-02-16	Atlas IIAS	Success	2,900 kg (6,400 lb)	Decommissioned	Replacement of JCSAT-4.
Superbird-4	Superbird-B2	HS-601HP	23 (+1 steerable) K_{u} band and 6 K_{a} band	1998	2000-02-18	Ariane 44LP	Success	4,057 kg (8,944 lb)	Operational at 162°E	
JCSAT-7 Superbird-5	N-SAT-110; JCSAT-110; Superbird-D	A2100AX	24 K_{u} band	1998	2000-10-06	Ariane 42L	Success	4,048 kg (8,924 lb)	Operational at 110°E	Replacement of JCSAT-3.
JCSAT-8	JCSAT-2A	BSS-601	16 C-band and 16 K_{u}-band	2000	2002-03-29	Ariane 44L	Success	2,460 kilograms (5,420 lb)	Operational at 154° E	Replacement of JCSAT-2.
N-STAR c	N-STAR c	GEOStar-2	1 C-band and 20 S-band	1999	2002-07-05	Ariane 5 G	Success	1,620 kilograms (3,570 lb)	Operational at 136° E	Launched with Stellat 5.
Horizons-1	Horizons-1; Galaxy 13	HS-601HP	24 K_{u}-band and 24 C-band	2001	2003-10-01	Zenit-3SL	Success	4,060 kilograms (8,950 lb)	Operational at 127° E	Co-owned with Intelsat.
Superbird-6	Superbird-A2	HS-601HP	23 K_{u}-band and 4 K_{a}-band	2001	2004-04-16	Atlas IIAS	Success	3,100 kilograms (6,800 lb)	Never commissioned	Injection orbit to supersynchronous orbit failed to account for lunar influence; satellite spent most of its fuel and suffered damage. Never commissioned.
JCSAT-9	JCSAT-5A; N-STAR d	A2100AXS	20 C-band, 20 K_{u}-band and 1 S-band	2003	2006-04-12	Zenit-3SLB	Success	4,401 kilograms (9,703 lb)	Operational at 132° E	Replacement of JCSAT-5.
JCSAT-10	JCSAT-3A	A2100AXS	30 K_{u}-band and 12 C-band	2004	2006-08-11	Ariane 5 ECA	Success	4,048 kilograms (8,924 lb)	Operational at 128° E	Launched with Syracuse-3B. Replacement of JCSAT-3.
JCSAT-11	—N/a	A2100AXS	30 K_{u}-band and 12 C-band	2005	2007-09-05	Proton-M/Briz-M	Failure	4,007 kilograms (8,834 lb)	Launch Failure	Was to serve as general backup. Lost at launch.
Horizons-2	Horizons-2	GEOStar-2	20 K_{u}-band	2005	2007-12-21	Ariane 5 GS	Success	2,304 kilograms (5,079 lb)	Operational at 85° E	Launched with Rascom-QAF 1. Co-owned with Intelsat
Superbird-7	Superbird-C2	DS2000	28 K_{u}-band	—N/a	2008-08-14	Ariane 5 ECA	Success	4,820 kilograms (10,630 lb)	Operational at 144° E	Launched with AMC-21.
JCSAT-12	JCSAT-RA	A2100AXS	12 C-band and 30 K_{u}-band	2007	2009-08-21	Ariane 5 ECA	Success	4,000 kilograms (8,800 lb)	Backup w/o slot	Launched with Optus D3. Replacement of JCSAT-11.
JCSAT-85	JCSAT-85; Intelsat 15	GEOStar-2	22 K_{u}-band	2007	2009-11-30	Zenit-3SLB	Success	2,484 kilograms (5,476 lb)	Operational at 85° E	JSAT owns 5 transponders on Intelsat 15.
JCSAT-110R	JCSAT-110R; BSAT-3c	A2100A	two payloads of 12 K_{u}-band each	2008	2011-08-06	Ariane 5 ECA	Success	2,910 kilograms (6,420 lb)	Operational at 110° E	Launched with Astra 1N. Co-owned with B-SAT, one payload each. Backup of N-SAT-110.
JCSAT-13	JCSAT-4B	A2100AXS	44 K_{u}-band	2009	2012-06-15	Ariane 5 ECA	Success	4,528 kilograms (9,983 lb)	Operational at 124° E	Launched with Vinasat-2. Replaced JCSAT-4A.
JCSAT-14	JCSAT-2B	SSL 1300	26 C-band and 18 K_{u}-band	2013	2016-05-06	Falcon 9 Full Thrust	Success	4,696 kilograms (10,353 lb)	Operational at 154° E	Replaced JCSAT-2A.
JCSAT-16	—N/a	SSL 1300	K_{u}-band and K_{a}-band	2014	2016-08-14	Falcon 9 Full Thrust	Success	4,600 kilograms (10,100 lb)	Commissioning (In transit to 162° E)	Will act as backup. Temporarily replacing delayed Superbird-8.
JCSAT-15	—N/a	SSL 1300	K_{u}	2014	2016-12-21	Ariane 5 ECA	Success	3,400 kilograms (7,500 lb)	Commissioning (In transit to 110° E)	Replacement for N-SAT-110.
DSN-2	Kirameki-2	NEC	X band military payload	—N/a	2017-01-24	H-IIA 204	Success	—N/a	Commissioning (In transit to 162° E	Managed for the DSN Corporation on behalf of the Japanese Military.
Superbird-8	Superbird-B3; DSN-1; Kirameki-1	DS2000	K_{u}-band, K_{a}-band and an X-band military payload	2014	2018-04-05	Ariane 5 ECA	Success	—N/a	Success	Replacement for Superbird-B2. DSN-1 payload for the Japanese military.
Horizons-3e	—N/a	BSS-702MP	C band and K_{u}-band	2015	2018-09-25	Ariane 5 ECA	Success	6000 kg	Success	Horizons Satellite 3rd satellite. Co-owned with Intelsat, Epic^{NG} architecture. Replacement for Intelsat 805.
JCSAT-17	—N/a	A2100	S-band, C-band and K_{u}-band	2016	2020-02-18	Ariane 5 ECA	Success	—N/a	Success	
JCSAT-18	JCSAT-18 / Kacific 1	BSS-702MP	K_{u}-band and 56 K_{a}-band	2017	2019-12-16	Falcon 9 Full Thrust	Success	6956 kg	Success	
Superbird-9	Superbird-9	OneSat	K_{u} band, K_{a} band	2021	2027	Starship Cargo	Planned	Unknown	Contracted	

== See also ==
- Broadcasting Satellite System Corporation – the only other significant Japanese satellite operator
- Intelsat – a major operator in the satellite communication market, with significant alliances with SKY Perfect JSAT Group
- NTT DoCoMo – a major player in the mobile communication Japanese market, with significant alliances with SKY Perfect JSAT Group
