= Superbird-A2 =

Geostationary communications satellite

- Names: Superbird-6
- Mission type: Communications
- Operator: SKY Perfect JSAT Group
- COSPAR ID: 2004-011A
- SATCAT no.: 28218
- Website: Archived official page
- Mission duration: 13 years (planned); Failed on orbit (achieved)

Spacecraft properties
- Spacecraft: Superbird-6
- Spacecraft type: Superbird
- Bus: BSS-601
- Manufacturer: Boeing
- Launch mass: 3,100 kg (6,800 lb)
- BOL mass: 1,528 kg (3,369 lb)
- Dry mass: 1,477 kg (3,256 lb)
- Dimensions: 26.2 m × 7.5 m × 4.5 m (86 ft × 25 ft × 15 ft) with solar panels and antennas deployed
- Power: 4378 watts

Start of mission
- Launch date: 16 April 2004, 00:45:00 UTC
- Rocket: Atlas IIAS
- Launch site: Cape Canaveral, LC-36B
- Contractor: International Launch Services (ILS)
- Entered service: Never in service

End of mission
- Disposal: Graveyard orbit
- Last contact: Failed on orbit

Orbital parameters
- Reference system: Geocentric orbit
- Regime: Geostationary orbit
- Longitude: 158° East

Transponders
- Band: 23 Ku-band 36 MHz; 4 Ka-band 100 MHz
- Bandwidth: 1228 MHz
- Coverage area: Japan, South Asia, East Asia, Hawaii
- TWTA power: Ku-band: 85 watts Ka-band: 70 watts

Superbird-A2, known as Superbird-6 before launch, was a geostationary communications satellite ordered and operated by Space Communications Corporation (SCC) that was designed and manufactured by Hughes (now Boeing) on the BSS-601 satellite bus. It had a mixed Ku-band and Ka-band payload and was expected replace Superbird-A at the position at 158° East longitude. It was expected to provided television signals and business communications services throughout Japan, South Asia, East Asia, and Hawaii.

While the launch was within the margins specified by the satellite manufacturer, the trajectory analysis had been inexact and the satellite suffered severe life and power degradation. It tried to use a supersynchronous transfer strategy, but Boeing had failed to take into consideration the effect of the Moon. Thus, the lowest part of the orbit dropped too fast and much propellant had to be spent on a fast transit to geosynchronous orbit. Additionally, the solar panels suffered damage from the extreme contact with the atmosphere. Given the damage to the spacecraft, it was never put into service.

== Satellite description ==
The spacecraft was designed and manufactured by Boeing Satellite Development Center on the BSS-601 satellite bus. It had a launch mass of 3,100 kg (6,800 lb), a beginning of life mass of 1,528 kg (3,369 lb) and an end of life mass of 1,477 kg (3,256 lb). It was designed for a 13-year life. When stowed for launch, it measured 4.5 m × 3.5 m × 3.5 m (15 ft × 11 ft × 11 ft). It had two wings with four solar panels each, that generated 4378 watts at the end of its design life. When fully deployed, the solar panels spanned 26.2 m (86 ft), with its antennas in fully extended configuration it was 7.5 m (25 ft) wide. It had a 29-cell NiH_{2} battery with a power charge of 200 Ah.

Its propulsion system was composed of a liquid apogee engine (LAE) with a thrust of 445 N (100 lb_{f}). It also used had 12 22 N (4.9 lb_{f}) bipropellant thrusters for station keeping and attitude control. It included enough propellant for orbit circularization and 13 years of operation.

It had a dual Ku-band and Ka-band payload. The Ku-band section had its 2.2 m (7 ft 3 in) dual-grid shaped antenna on the West side. It had twenty three transponders powered by Traveling-wave tube#Traveling-wave-tube amplifier (TWTA) with and output power of 85 watts. It had a wide beam footprint that covered Japan, South Asia, East Asia, and Hawaii.

Its Ka-band section had a 2.2 m (7 ft 3 in) single-grid shaped antenna on the East side for the wide beam, and a nadir 1.2 m (3 ft 11 in) shaped surface antenna for the steerable beam. It had four 100 MHz transponders powered by TWTA with and output power of 70 Watts. The wide beam covered Japan, South Asia, East Asia, and Hawaii, while the steerable beam could be focus on any zone that had line-of-sight to the satellite.

== History ==
Space Communications Corporation (SCC) was founded in 1985, the same year as the original companies that later formed JSAT. In September 2001, SCC ordered its third BSS-601 based spacecraft, Superbird-6. It was to use the 158° East position and offer a Japan wide beam service in Ku-band and Ka-band, plus steerable Ka-band spot beams. It was expected for a fall of 2003 launch aboard an Atlas IIAS.

It was decided to launch Superbird-6 into a 2895 minutes period supersynchronous orbit with an apogee of 120,679 km, a perigee of 1138 km and a 25.5° inclination. This extreme perigee and a six-maneuvers circularization program would reduce the propellant expenditure to its final position in geosynchronous orbit.

It was launched on 16 April 2004 by an Atlas IIAS that injected in the supersynchronous orbit specified by the satellite manufacturer, at which point it was named Superbird-A2. But the orbit analysis had failed to take into consideration the influence of the Moon at such high apogees and the perigee started to drop dangerously fast. Most of its propellant had to be spent and the solar panels suffered damage that reduced the power production. The satellite can not enter service as planned in July 2004. One of two main fuel tanks on the spacecraft lost pressure on 28 November 2004. The satellite was never commissioned into regular service.

== See also ==
- Superbird-9
