= Superbird-C =

Geostationary communications satellite

- Names: Superbird-3; Superbird-A3
- Mission type: Communications
- Operator: SKY Perfect JSAT Group
- COSPAR ID: 1997-036A
- SATCAT no.: 24880
- Mission duration: 13 years (planned); 18 years (achieved)

Spacecraft properties
- Spacecraft: Superbird-3
- Spacecraft type: Superbird
- Bus: BBS-601
- Manufacturer: Hughes
- Launch mass: 3,130 kg (6,900 lb)
- Dry mass: 1,416 kg (3,122 lb)
- Dimensions: 26.2 m × 7.5 m × 4.9 m (86 ft × 25 ft × 16 ft) with solar panels and antennas deployed.
- Power: 4.5 kW

Start of mission
- Launch date: 28 July 1997, 01:15:01 UTC
- Rocket: Atlas IIAS (s/n AC-133)
- Launch site: Cape Canaveral, LC-36B
- Contractor: International Launch Services (ILS)

End of mission
- Disposal: Graveyard orbit
- Deactivated: 2015
- Last contact: 2015

Orbital parameters
- Reference system: Geocentric orbit
- Regime: Geostationary orbit
- Longitude: 144° East

Transponders
- Band: 4 Ku-band × 54 Mhz; 4 × 36 MHz and 16 × 27 MHz
- Coverage area: Japan, South Asia, East Asia, Hawaii
- TWTA power: 90 watts

Superbird-C, also known as Superbird-3 or Superbird-A3, was a geostationary communications satellite ordered and operated by Space Communications Corporation (SCC) that was designed and manufactured by Hughes Space and Communications Company (now Boeing Satellite Systems) on the HS-601 satellite bus. It has a pure Ku-band payload and was used to fill the position at 144° East longitude. It provided television signals and business communications services throughout Japan, South Asia, East Asia, and Hawaii.

== Satellite description ==
The spacecraft was designed and manufactured by then Hughes Space and Communications Company (now Boeing Satellite Development Center) on the HS-601 satellite bus. It had a launch mass of 3,150 kg (6,940 lb), a dry mass of 1,416 kg (3,122 lb) and a 13-year design life. When stowed for launch, it measured 4 m × 3.8 m × 2.4 m (13.1 ft × 12.5 ft × 7.9 ft). It had two wings with four solar panels each, that generated 4.5 kW at the end of its design life. When fully deployed, the solar panels spanned 26.2 m (86 ft), with its antennas in fully extended configuration it was 7.5 m (25 ft) wide. It had a 29-cell NiH_{2} battery with a power charge of 200 Ah.

Its propulsion system was composed of an R-4D-11-300 liquid apogee engine (LAE) with a thrust of 490 N (110 lb_{f}). It also used had 12 22 N (4.9 lb_{f}) bipropellant thrusters for station keeping and attitude control. It included enough propellant for orbit circularization and 13 years of operation.

Its payload is composed of two 2.2 m (7 ft 3 in) dual-gridded reflectors and twenty four Ku-band transponders powered by a traveling-wave-tube amplifier (TWTA) with and output power of 90 watts. It can configure two 54 MHz transponders into one 114 MHz with an effective 180 watts.

The Ku-band footprint covered Japan, southern and eastern Asia, and Hawaii.

== History ==
Space Communications Corporation (SCC) was founded in 1985, the same year as the original companies that later formed JSAT. SCC switched satellite suppliers and on 1995 ordered a satellite from Boeing, Superbird-C.

On 28 July 1997 at 01:15:01 UTC, Superbird-C was put into orbit by an Atlas IIAS launched from Cape Canaveral LC-36B.

Superbird-C was replaced by Superbird-C2 during 2008, in 2015 it was decommissioned.
