= JCSAT-3 =

Geostationary communications satellite

- Mission type: Communications
- Operator: JSAT
- COSPAR ID: 1995-043A
- SATCAT no.: 23649
- Mission duration: 12 years (planned)

Spacecraft properties
- Spacecraft: JCSAT-3
- Spacecraft type: JCSAT
- Bus: HS-601
- Manufacturer: Hughes
- Launch mass: 3,105 kg (6,845 lb)
- Dry mass: 1,841 kg (4,059 lb)
- Dimensions: 26.2 m × 7.5 m (86 ft × 25 ft) with solar panels and antennas deployed.
- Power: 5 kW

Start of mission
- Launch date: 29 August 1995, 00:53:02 UTC
- Rocket: Atlas IIAS
- Launch site: Cape Canaveral, LC-36B
- Contractor: International Launch Services (ILS)

End of mission
- Disposal: Graveyard orbit
- Deactivated: March 2007
- Last contact: March 2007

Orbital parameters
- Reference system: Geocentric orbit
- Regime: Geostationary orbit
- Longitude: 128° East

Transponders
- Band: Ku-band: 12 × 36 Mhz + 16 × 27 MHz; C-band: 12 x 36 MHz
- Bandwidth: 1296 MHz
- Coverage area: Japan
- TWTA power: Ku-band: 63 watts C-band: 34 watts

JCSAT-3 was a geostationary communications satellite designed and manufactured by Hughes (now Boeing) on the HS-601 satellite bus. It was originally ordered by JSAT Corporation, which later merged into the SKY Perfect JSAT Group. It has a mixed Ku-band and C-band payload and operated on the 128° East longitude until it was replaced by JCSAT-3A.

== Satellite description ==
The spacecraft was designed and manufactured by Hughes on the HS-601 satellite bus. It had a launch mass of 3,105 kg (6,845 lb), a dry mass of 1,841 kg (4,059 lb) and a 12-year design life. When stowed for launch, its dimensions were 2.8 m × 4.9 m × 3.8 m (9 ft 2 in × 16 ft 1 in × 12 ft 6 in). With its solar panels fully extended it spanned 26.2 m (86 ft), and its width when its antennas were fully deployed was 7.5 m (25 ft). Its power system generated approximately 5 kW of power thanks to two wings with four solar panels each. It also had a single NiH_{2} battery composed of 30 cells and a 200 Ah charge. It would serve as the main satellite on the 128° East longitude position of the JSAT fleet.

Its propulsion system was composed of an R-4D-11-300 liquid apogee engine (LAE) with a thrust of 490 N (110 lb_{f}). It also used had 12 22 N (4.9 lb_{f}) bipropellant thrusters for station keeping and attitude control. It included enough propellant for orbit circularization and 12 years of operation.

Its payload is composed of four octagonal antenna fed by twelve 36 MHz and sixteen 27 MHz Ku-band plus twelve 27 MHz C-band transponders for a total bandwidth of 1296 MHz. The Ku-band transponders have a TWTA output power of 63 watts while the twelve C-band transponders have 34 watts of power.

== History ==
In 1993, Japan Communications Satellite Company and Satellite Japan Corporation merged to form Japan Satellite Systems Inc. (JCSAT). That same year, JCSAT ordered JCSAT-3, a third satellite from Hughes, but this time using the HS-601 platform. In 1995, JCSAT obtained a license for international service, and thus became a regional operator.

On 29 August 1995 at 00:53:02 UTC, an Atlas IIAS launching from Cape Canaveral LC-36B successfully launched JCSAT-3 into orbit. It was positioned into the 128° East orbital longitude.

On 20 April 2004, JSAT ordered a second satellite from Lockheed Martin, JCSAT-10. Based on the A2100-AX satellite bus, it would have a C-band and Ku-band payload and was expected to replace JCSAT-3 at the 128° East orbital longitude after its planned 2006 launch. On 11 August 2006, an Ariane 5 ECA launched JCSAT-10 (JCSAT-3A) along Syracuse-3B into a transfer orbit. Upon successful deployment at 128° East longitude, it was renamed JCSAT-3A. In March 2007, JCSAT-3 was retired and decommissioned.
