= JCSAT-11 =

Geostationary communications satellite

- Mission type: Communication
- Operator: SKY Perfect JSAT Group
- COSPAR ID: 2007-F03

Spacecraft properties
- Spacecraft: JCSAT-11
- Bus: A2100AX
- Manufacturer: Lockheed Martin
- Launch mass: 4,007 kg (8,834 lb)
- Dimensions: 27 m × 9 m (89 ft × 30 ft) with solar panels and antennas deployed.

Start of mission
- Launch date: 22:43:10, September 5, 2007 (UTC)
- Rocket: Proton-M/Briz-M
- Launch site: Baikonur Site 200/39
- Contractor: ILS

End of mission
- Destroyed: Launch failure

Transponders
- Band: 18 × 27 Mhz and 12 × 36 MHz K_{u} band 12 × 36 MHz C band
- Bandwidth: 1,350 MHz
- TWTA power: K_{u} band 127 W C band 48 W

JCSAT-11, was a geostationary communications satellite ordered by JSAT Corporation (now SKY Perfect JSAT Group) which was designed and manufactured by Lockheed Martin on the A2100 platform. The satellite was designated to be used as an on orbit spare, but was lost on launch failure.

== Satellite description ==
The spacecraft was designed and manufactured by Lockheed Martin on the A2100AX satellite bus. It had a launch mass of 4,007 kg (8,834 lb) and a 15-year design life. A near copy of JCSAT-3A, it was to be used as an on orbit spare. As most satellites based on the A2100 platform, it uses a 460 N (100 lb_{f}) LEROS-1C LAE for orbit raising. Its solar panels span 27 m (89 ft) when fully deployed and, with its antennas in fully extended configuration it is 9 m (30 ft) wide.

Its payload is composed of eighteen 27 MHz and twelve 36 MHz K_{u} band plus twelve C band transponders, for a total bandwidth of 1,350 MHz. Its high-power amplifiers had an output power of 127 Watts on K_{u} band and 48 Watts on C band.

== History ==
On October 3, 2005, JSAT ordered an A2100AX based satellite from Lockheed Martin, JCSAT-11. It would be an almost copy of JCSAT-3A, with a C band and K_{u} band payload. It was expected to be launched in 2007 to act as a backup for the whole JSAT fleet.

The almost 19-year streak of successful JCSAT launches was ended when a Proton-M/Briz-M failed to orbit JCSAT-11 on September 5, 2007. A damaged pyro firing cable on the interstage truss prevented the second stage from controlling its direction, and the rocket and its payload crashed into the Kazakhstan steppes. Being lucky in misfortune, JCSAT-11 was simply an on orbit backup and thus it had no operational impact on the fleet.

The same day of the launch failure, JSAT placed an order with Lockheed for an identical replacement, JCSAT-12, for launch in 2009. On September 19, 2007, they closed a deal with Arianespace for a launch slot with an Ariane 5 for its launch.
