= Superbird-B3 =

Geostationary communication satellite

- Names: Superbird-8; DSN-1; Kirameki-1
- Mission type: Communications
- Operator: SKY Perfect JSAT Group
- COSPAR ID: 2018-033A
- SATCAT no.: 43271
- Mission duration: 15 years (planned)

Spacecraft properties
- Spacecraft: Superbird-8
- Spacecraft type: Superbird
- Bus: DS2000
- Manufacturer: Mitsubishi Electric
- Launch mass: 5,348 kg (11,790 lb)

Start of mission
- Launch date: 5 April 2018, 21:34:07 UTC
- Rocket: Ariane 5 ECA (VA242)
- Launch site: Centre Spatial Guyanais, ELA-3
- Contractor: Arianespace

Orbital parameters
- Reference system: Geocentric orbit
- Regime: Geostationary orbit
- Longitude: 162° East

Transponders
- Band: Ku-band, Ka-band and X-band
- Coverage area: Japan

Superbird-B3, known as Superbird-8 before launch, and DSN-1 (Kirameki-1) for its military payload, is a geostationary communications satellite operated by SKY Perfect JSAT Group and designed and manufactured by Mitsubishi Electric on the DS2000 satellite bus.

It is intended to replace Superbird-B2 on the 162° East, offering Ku-band and Ka-band communication services to the Japanese market. It will also serve as one of the two planned X-band military satellites of the DSN network, in this role, it will be known as DSN-1 (Kirameki-1).

Originally intended to be launched by an Ariane 5 ECA in the second half of fiscal year 2015, a mishap during transport to the launch site in March 2016 meant that it would be delayed up to two years.

== History ==
JSAT along NEC, NTT Com and Maeda Corporation formed a joint venture called DSN Corporation. On 15 January 2013, DSN Corporation announced that it had closed a contract with the Ministry of Defense to execute the "Program to Upgrade and Operate X-Band Satellite Communications Functions, etc". The contract is a private finance initiative, where private funds, management and technical capabilities are used to upgrade and operate the Japanese military X-band satellite network. Based on this program, DSN Corporation will manufacture and launch two satellites plus perform the necessary upgrades to ground control stations. It will also operate, manage and maintain the facilities and equipment through fiscal years 2015 to 2030. The total program cost was estimated at ¥122,074,026,613.

The plan called for the launch of the first satellite in December 2015, with a start of operations in March 2016 and a termination of operations in April 2030. The second satellite was expected to launch in January 2017, starting operations in March 2017. The program and the operations of the second satellite are expected to last until March 2031. JSAT role is the procurement and general management of the satellites. The first satellite, DSN-1, is actually an additional payload on one of JSAT's own satellites, Superbird-8. The second satellite, DSN-2 is a dedicated spacecraft.

On 25 April 2014, JSAT announced that it had placed an order with Mitsubishi Electric (MELCO) and its satellite platform DS2000 for its Superbird-8 satellite. It would replace Superbird-B2 and be positioned on the 162° East orbital slot. On an earning revision, JSAT disclosed that they had confirmed container deformation after Superbird-8 arrived to its launch site. In July 2016, it was published that a 25 May 2016 mishap during air transport had delayed the satellite launch by an estimated two years. A dislodged tarpaulin had blocked the bleed valve on the satellite container and the spacecraft had suffered damage from overpressurization.

== See also ==
- DS2000 – The satellite bus on which Superbird-C2 is based
- SKY PerfecTV! – Satellite TV division of the same owner corporation and major user of Superbird-C2
