= JCSAT-4 =

Geostationary communications satellite

- Names: JCSAT-4 (1995–1997); JCSAT-R (1997–2009); Intelsat 26 (2009–present)
- Mission type: Communications
- Operator: JSAT / Intelsat
- COSPAR ID: 1997-007A
- SATCAT no.: 24732
- Mission duration: 12 years (planned)

Spacecraft properties
- Spacecraft: JCSAT-4
- Spacecraft type: JCSAT
- Bus: HS-601
- Manufacturer: Hughes
- Launch mass: 3,105 kg (6,845 lb)
- Dry mass: 1,841 kg (4,059 lb)
- Dimensions: 26.2 m × 7.5 m (86 ft × 25 ft) with solar panels and antennas deployed
- Power: 5 kW

Start of mission
- Launch date: 17 February 1997, 01:42:02 UTC
- Rocket: Atlas IIAS
- Launch site: Cape Canaveral, LC-36B
- Contractor: International Launch Services (ILS)

Orbital parameters
- Reference system: Geocentric orbit
- Regime: Geostationary orbit
- Longitude: 124° East

Transponders
- Band: Ku-band: 12 × 36 Mhz + 16 × 27 MHz; C-band: 12 x 36 MHz
- Bandwidth: 1296 MHz
- Coverage area: Japan, East Asia, South Asia, Australia, New Zealand, Hawaii
- TWTA power: Ku-band: 4 × 36 MHz 95 watts 8 × 36 MHz 63 watts 16 × 27 MHz 63 watts C-band: 12 x 36 MHz 34 watts

JCSAT-4 was known as JCSAT-R until it was sold to Intelsat in 2009 (Intelsat 26). It is a geostationary communications satellite designed and manufactured by Hughes (now Boeing) on the HS-601 satellite bus. It was originally ordered by JSAT Corporation, which later merged into the SKY Perfect JSAT Group. It has a mixed Ku-band and C-band payload and was used as an on orbit spare.

== Satellite description ==
The spacecraft was designed and manufactured by Hughes on the HS-601 satellite bus. It had a launch mass of 3,105 kg (6,845 lb), a dry mass of 1,841 kg (4,059 lb) and a 12-year design life. When stowed for launch, its dimensions were 2.8 m × 4.9 m × 3.8 m (9 ft 2 in × 16 ft 1 in × 12 ft 6 in). With its solar panels fully extended it spanned 26.2 m (86 ft), and its width when its antennas were fully deployed was 7.5 m (25 ft). Its power system generated approximately 5 kW of power due to two wings with four solar panels each. It also had a single NiH_{2} battery composed of 30 cells and a 200 Ah charge. It would serve as on orbit backup for the JSAT fleet.

Its propulsion system was composed of an R-4D-11-300 liquid apogee engine (LAE) with a thrust of 490 N (110 lb_{f}). It also used had 12 22 N (4.9 lb_{f}) bipropellant thrusters for station keeping and attitude control. It included enough propellant for orbit circularization and 12 years of operation. Its payload is composed of four octagonal antenna fed by twelve 36 MHz and sixteen 27 MHz Ku-band plus twelve 27 MHz C-band transponders for a total bandwidth of 1296 MHz. Eight of the 36 MHz and the sixteen 27 MHz Ku-band transponders have a TWTA output power of 63 watts, the other four 36 MHz ones have 95 watts. It can configure four 27 MHz transponders into a single 54 MHz with an effective 125 watts. The twelve C-band transponders have 36 MHz bandwidth and 34 watts of power.

== History ==
In December 1995, JSAT ordered its fourth satellite from Hughes, and second of the HS-601 platform, the JCSAT-4. It was an almost copy of the JCSAT-3, also based on the HS-601, but with more powerful transponders. It would have a mixed Ku-band and C-band payload, a power generation capability of 5000 watts and a 12 year of design life. It was expected to be delivered by early 1997 and be positioned at the 124° East longitude. It would provide telecommunications and television services to Japan, all of Asia, Hawaii and Australia and New Zealand.

On 25 March 1996, International Launch Services (ILS) announced a contract with JSAT for the launch of JCSAT-4 aboard an Atlas IIAS. At the time it was expected to launch in January 1997 from Cape Canaveral at LC-36A launch pad. This was the second contract of ILS with JSAT after the successful launch of JCSAT-3 in August 1995.

On 18 February 1997 at 01:42:02 UTC, and Atlas IIAS launched from Cape Canaveral LC-36B with JCSAT-4 towards a geosynchronous transfer orbit (GTO). After the successful launch, it was renamed JCSAT-R. During its tenure as JCSAT-R it operated on the 124° East longitude. In August, 2008, JSAT was merged into the SKY Perfect JSAT Group.

== Intelsat 26 ==
In late 2009, Intelsat bought JCSAT-R and rechristened it Intelsat 26. In March 2010, Intelsat announced an agreement with Türksat for loaning Intelsat 26 so the latter could keep its orbital rights until a new satellite could be launched. In July 2010, it was positioned at the 50° East longitude with a 3.4° inclination. In January 2013, the inclination had increased to 4.6°. In August 2016, the satellite was positioned at 64.1° East with a 6.97° inclination.
