= DSN Corporation =

Japanese satellite network company

- Native name

Japanese name
- Kanji: 株式会社ディー・エス・エヌ
- Literal meaning: DSN Corporation
Transcriptions
- Revised Hepburn: kabushikigaisha dii·esu·enu
- Company type: Joint venture
- Industry: Satellite communications
- Founded: 19 December 2012; 13 years ago in Tokyo, Japan
- Founders: SKY Perfect JSAT Group, NEC and NTT Com
- Headquarters: 1-14-14 Akasaka, Minato-ku, Tokyo, Tokyo, Japan
- Area served: Japan
- Key people: Koki Koyama
- Products: DSN military satellites
- Revenue: 1,530,000,000 United States dollar (2012)
- Total equity: ¥1 Billion (2013)
- Owner: 65.0% SKY Perfect JSAT Group; 17.5% NTT Com; 17.5% NEC

DSN Corporation Japanese: 株式会社ディー・エス・エヌ is a corporation owned by SKY Perfect JSAT Group, NEC and NTT Com. It was founded on 19 December 2012 for the sole purpose of acting as an investment vehicle in the private finance initiative that would handle the Japanese military X-band DSN satellite network from 2015 to 2031.

== History ==
SKY Perfect JSAT Group (JSAT) along NEC, NTT Com and Maeda Corporation formed a joint venture called DSN Corporation. On 15 January 2013, DSN Corporation announced that it had closed a contract with the Ministry of Defense to execute the "Program to Upgrade and Operate X-Band Satellite Communications Functions, etc". The contract is a private finance initiative, where private funds, management and technical capabilities are used to upgrade and operate the Japanese military X-band DSN satellite network.

Based on this program, DSN Corporation will manufacture and launch two satellites plus perform the necessary upgrades to ground control stations. It will also operate, manage and maintain the facilities and equipment through fiscal years 2015 to 2030. The total program cost was estimated at ¥122,074,026,613.

The plan called for the launch of the first satellite in December 2015, with a start of operations in March 2016 and a termination of operations on April 2030. The second satellite was expected to launch in January 2017, starting operations in March 2017. The program and the operations of the second satellite were expected by March 2031.

JSAT role is the procurement and general management of the satellites. The first satellite, DSN-1, is actually an additional payload on one of JSAT's own satellites, Superbird-8. The second satellite, DSN-2 is a dedicated spacecraft.

On 25 April 2014, JSAT announced that it had placed an order with MELCO and its satellite platform DS2000 for its Superbird-8 satellite. It would replace Superbird-B2 and be positioned on the 162° East orbital slot.

On an earning revision, JSAT disclosed that they had confirmed container deformation after Superbird-8 / DSN-1 arrived to its launch site. In July 2016, it was published that a 25 May 2016 mishap during air transport had delayed the satellite launch by an estimated two years. A dislodged tarpaulin had blocked the bleed valve on the satellite container and the spacecraft had suffer from over pressurization damage.

== Satellite network ==
The initial plan calls for two satellites: DSN-1 or Kirameki-1 and DSN-2 or Kirameki-2. DSN-1 was supposed to be launched in 2015, but was delayed for early 2016. It was damaged during transport to the launch site on 25 May 2016, and repairs might take up to two year. The schedule has not been updated as of August 2016, but DSN-2 will be launched before DSN-1.

Project	Name	Bus	Payload	Launch	Vehicle	Launch	Status	Remarks
DSN-1	Kirameki-1; DSN-1; Superbird-B3	DS2000	X-band military payload and JSAT's Ku-band, Ka-band	5 April 2018	Ariane 5 ECA	Success	Operational	DSN-1 Payload for the Japanese Military. Replacement for Superbird-B2.
DSN-2	Kirameki-2	NEC NX-G	X-band military payload	24 January 2017	H-IIA 204	Success	Operational	Managed for the DSN Corporation on behalf of the Japanese Military.
DSN-3	Kirameki-3	NEC NX-G	X-band military payload	4 November 2024	H3-22S	Success	Operational	Managed for the DSN Corporation on behalf of the Japanese Military.

== See also ==
- JSAT (satellite constellation) – The whole constellation of satellites managed by JSAT.
