= JCSAT-2 =

Geostationary communications satellite

- Mission type: Communications
- Operator: JSAT Corporation
- COSPAR ID: 1990-001B
- SATCAT no.: 20402
- Mission duration: 8 years (planned)

Spacecraft properties
- Spacecraft: JCSAT-2
- Spacecraft type: JCSAT
- Bus: HS-393
- Manufacturer: Hughes
- Launch mass: 2,280 kg (5,030 lb)
- BOL mass: 1,364 kg (3,007 lb)
- Dimensions: 3.7 m × 10 m × 2.3 m (12.1 ft × 32.8 ft × 7.5 ft) with solar panels and antennas deployed.
- Power: 2.350 kW

Start of mission
- Launch date: 1 January 1990, 00:07 UTC
- Rocket: Commercial Titan III (s/n CT-1) (maiden launch)
- Launch site: Cape Canaveral, SLC-40
- Contractor: Martin Marietta

End of mission
- Disposal: Graveyard orbit
- Deactivated: 2002

Orbital parameters
- Reference system: Geocentric orbit
- Regime: Geostationary orbit
- Longitude: 154° East

Transponders
- Band: 32 Ku-band × 27 Mhz
- Bandwidth: 864 MHz
- Coverage area: Japan
- TWTA power: 20 watts

JCSAT-2 was a geostationary communications satellite designed and manufactured by Hughes (now Boeing) on the HS-393 satellite bus. It was originally ordered by Japan Communications Satellite Company (JCSAT), which later merged into the JSAT Corporation. It had a Ku-band payload and operated on the 154° East longitude until it was replaced by JCSAT-2A.

== Satellite description ==
The spacecraft was designed and manufactured by Hughes Space and Communications Company on the HS-393 satellite bus. It had a launch mass of 2,280 kg (5,030 lb), a mass of 1,364 kg (3,007 lb) after reaching geostationary orbit and an 8-year design life. When stowed for launch, its dimensions were 3.4 m (11 ft) long and 3.7 m (12 ft) in diameter. With its solar panels fully extended it spanned 10 m (33 ft). Its power system generated approximately 2350 watts of power thanks to two cylindrical solar panels. It also had a two 38 Ah NiH_{2} batteries. It would serve as the main satellite on the 150° East longitude position of the JSAT fleet.

Its propulsion system was composed of two R-4D-12 liquid apogee engines (LAE) with a thrust of 490 N (110 lb_{f}). It also used two axial and four radial 22 N (4.9 lb_{f}) bipropellant thrusters for station keeping and attitude control. It included enough propellant for orbit circularization and 8 years of operation. Its payload was composed of a 2.4 m (7 ft 10 in) antenna fed by thirty-two 27 MHz Ku-band transponders for a total bandwidth of 864 MHz. The Ku-band transponders had a Traveling-wave tube#Traveling-wave-tube amplifier (TWTA) output power of 20 watts.

== History ==
With the opening of the Japanese satellite communications market to private investment, Japan Communications Satellite Company (JCSAT) was founded in 1985. In June of the same year, JCSAT awarded an order to Hughes Space and Communications for two identical satellites, JCSAT-1 and JCSAT-2, based on the spin-stabilized HS-393 satellite bus. JCSAT-2 was successfully launched aboard a Commercial Titan III (maiden launch) along Skynet 4A on 1 January 1990 at 00:07 UTC. Originally expected to be retired in 2000, it was finally sent to a graveyard orbit on 2002.
