= JCSAT-110 =

Geostationary communications satellite

- Names: N-SAT 110 (Nov 1998 to Oct 2000); JCSAT-7 (Nov 1998 to Oct 2000); JCSAT-110 (Oct 2000 onward); Superbird-5 (Nov 1998 to Oct 2000); Superbird-D (Oct 2000 to Oct 2008)
- Mission type: Communications
- Operator: SKY Perfect JSAT Group
- COSPAR ID: 2000-060A
- SATCAT no.: 26559
- Website: JSAT official page
- Mission duration: 13 years (planned)

Spacecraft properties
- Spacecraft: JCSAT-110
- Spacecraft type: JCSAT
- Bus: A2100-AX
- Manufacturer: Lockheed Martin Space
- Launch mass: 3,531 kg (7,785 lb)
- Dry mass: 1,669 kg (3,680 lb)
- Power: 8.3 kW

Start of mission
- Launch date: 6 October 2000, 23:00 UTC
- Rocket: Ariane 42L H10-3
- Launch site: Centre Spatial Guyanais, ELA-2
- Contractor: Arianespace

Orbital parameters
- Reference system: Geocentric orbit
- Regime: Geostationary orbit
- Longitude: 110° East

Transponders
- Band: 24 Ku-band × 36 MHz transponders
- Bandwidth: 864 MHz
- Coverage area: Japan
- TWTA power: 120 watts

JCSAT-110, also known as N-SAT 110, JCSAT-7, Superbird-5 and Superbird-D, is a Japanese geostationary communications satellite which was operated by JSAT Corporation and Space Communications Corporation until both companies merged into SKY Perfect JSAT Group in 2008. It is positioned in geostationary orbit at a longitude of 110° East, from where it is used to provide communications services to Japan.

== Satellite description ==
The spacecraft was designed and manufactured by Lockheed Martin on the A2100-AX satellite bus. It had a launch mass of 3,531 kg (7,785 lb) with a dry mass of 1,669 kg (3,680 lb) and a 13-year design life. As most satellites based on the A2100-AX platform, it uses a 460 N (100 lb_{f}) LEROS-1C liquid apogee engine (LAE) for orbit raising.

When stowed for launch, the satellite was 6 m (20 ft) high. Its dual wing solar panels gave a power generation capability of 8.3 kW at the end of its design life, with a span of 26.4 m (87 ft) when deployed. With antennas deployed, its width was 8.3 m (27 ft).

Its payload is composed of twenty-four 36 MHz Ku-band transponders with a TWTA output power of 120 watts per channel. With its total bandwidth of 864 GHz, it is used primarily for multi-channel pay per view business.

== History ==
In September 1997, both JCSAT and Space Communications Corporation (SCC) had requested the 110° East position. The Japanese government made both companies share the 110° East position, and thus they both made a joint order on 20 November 1998 for N-SAT 110 from Lockheed Martin. JCSAT used the JCSAT-7 designation for this satellite, while SCC used Superbird-5.

On 6 October 2000 at 23:00 UTC, an Ariane-42L H10-3 successfully launched N-SAT 110 to a geostationary transfer orbit from Centre Spatial Guyanais ELA-2. One hour later, at 00:04 UTC, on 7 October 2000, the first signals from the satellite were successfully received from the Australia ground station. On 14 October 2000, at around 03:00 UTC, N-SAT 110 reached the geostationary orbit. Once it was put into orbit, it was renamed as JCSAT-110 by JCSAT and Superbird-D by SCC.

On 1 October 2008, JSAT Corporation and Space Communications Corporation merged into SKY Perfect JSAT Group, and the satellite was known simply as JCSAT-110.

== See also ==
- 2000 in spaceflight
