= JCSAT-2B =

Geostationary communications satellite

- Names: JCSAT-14
- Mission type: Communication
- Operator: SKY Perfect JSAT Group
- COSPAR ID: JCSAT-14
- SATCAT no.: 41471

Spacecraft properties
- Spacecraft: JCSAT-14
- Bus: SSL 1300
- Manufacturer: SSL
- Launch mass: 4,696.2 kg (10,353 lb)
- Dry mass: 2,194.2 kg (4,837 lb)
- Dimensions: 25.5 m (84 ft) (solar arrays span)
- Power: 9.9 kW

Start of mission
- Launch date: 05:21, May 6, 2016 (UTC)
- Rocket: Falcon 9 Full Thrust
- Launch site: Cape Canaveral SLC-40
- Contractor: SpaceX

Orbital parameters
- Longitude: 154°East

Transponders
- Band: 26 C band and 18 K_{u} band
- Bandwidth: 2,853 MHz

JCSAT-2B, known as JCSAT-14 before commissioning, is a geostationary communications satellite operated by SKY Perfect JSAT Group and designed and manufactured by SSL on the SSL 1300 platform. It had a launch weight of 4,696.2 kg (10,353 lb), a power production capacity of 9 to 9.9 kW at end of life and a 15-year design life. Its payload is composed of 26 C band and 18 K_{u} band transponders with a total bandwidth of 2,853 MHz.

SKY Perfect JSAT Group will use JCSAT-2B as a replacement for JCSAT-2A to provide communications services to Japan, Asia, Russia, Oceania, and the Pacific Islands.

== History ==
On June 11, 2013, SSL announced that it had been awarded a contract by SKY Perfect JSAT Group to manufacture JCSAT-14. It would be a 10 kW satellite with 26 C band and 18 K_{u} band transponders with a 15 years of expected life. It was scheduled for launch in 2015.

On January 10, 2014, JSAT announced that it had signed a launch service contract with SpaceX for the launch of JCSAT-14 aboard a Falcon 9 rocket. The expected launch date was the second half of 2015. But the failure of Falcon 9 Flight 19 meant a delay of at least six months on the launch.

On March 14, 2016, SSL delivered JCSAT-14 to the launch site, at Cape Canaveral Air Force Station, for launch processing and integration. JCSAT-14 was launched on May 6, 2016, at 05:21 UTC by a Falcon 9 rocket. The next day, SSL announced that the satellite had deployed the solar arrays, was in full control and was performing orbital maneuvers to reach its operational position.

Since July 2016, the rechristened JCSAT-2B is commissioned and operational at the 154° East orbital slot.

== Launch and rocket landing ==
JCSAT-14 was launched to geostationary transfer orbit on May 6, 2016, at 05:21 UTC, as the 24th mission of a Falcon 9 Full Thrust rocket. The rocket's first stage subsequently landed on the autonomous spaceport drone ship Of Course I Still Love You in the Atlantic Ocean.

The first stage of the rocket encountered "extreme temperatures during its reentry into Earth atmosphere" and was subsequently identified as a candidate for reflight, and as a "reference vehicle" for further testing. It was subjected to a series of tests, including a 150-second full-duration engine firing completed on 28 July 2016. Additional tests were planned before SpaceX determines the stage's suitability for reuse on a subsequent launch. SpaceX has since completed at least 7 more full-duration firings of the core, and has indicated that this stage will be used solely for ground testing purposes.

== See also ==
- JCSAT-16, a similar satellite.
- SKY PerfecTV!, the satellite TV division of the parent company, primary user of JCSAT-14.
- List of Falcon 9 launches
