= JCSAT-1B =

Geostationary communications satellite

- Names: JCSAT-5 (Jun 1996 to Dec 1997); JCSAT-1B (Dec 1997 onward)
- Mission type: Communications
- Operator: SKY Perfect JSAT Group
- COSPAR ID: 1997-075A
- SATCAT no.: 25067
- Website: http://www.jsat.net/en/contour/jcsat-1b.html
- Mission duration: 12 years (planned)

Spacecraft properties
- Spacecraft: JCSAT-5
- Spacecraft type: JCSAT
- Bus: HS-601
- Manufacturer: Hughes
- Launch mass: 2,982 kg (6,574 lb)
- Dry mass: 1,308 kg (2,884 lb)
- Dimensions: 26.1 m × 7.6 m (86 ft × 25 ft) with solar panels and antennas deployed
- Power: 5 kW

Start of mission
- Launch date: 2 December 1997, 22:52:32 UTC
- Rocket: Ariane 44P
- Launch site: Centre Spatial Guyanais, ELA-2
- Contractor: Arianespace

Orbital parameters
- Reference system: Geocentric orbit
- Regime: Geostationary orbit
- Longitude: 150° East

Transponders
- Band: Ku-band: 16 × 36 Mhz + 16 × 27 MHz
- Bandwidth: 1008 MHz
- Coverage area: Japan, East Asia, South Asia, Australia, Hawaii
- TWTA power: 12 × 36 MHz 95 watts 4 × 36 MHz 60 watts 16 × 27 MHz 60 watts

JCSAT-1B, known as JCSAT-5 before launch, is a geostationary communications satellite operated by SKY Perfect JSAT Group (JSAT) which was designed and manufactured by Hughes (now Boeing) on the HS-601 satellite bus. It has a pure Ku-band payload and was used to replace JCSAT-1 at the 150° East longitude. It covers Japan, Korea, most of China, Thailand, Vietnam, Laos, part of Indonesia, part of Malaysia and Hawaii.

== Satellite description ==
The spacecraft was designed and manufactured by Boeing Satellite Development Center on the HS-601 satellite bus. It had a launch mass of 2,982 kg (6,574 lb) and a 12-year design life. Its solar panels span 21 m (69 ft) when fully deployed and generated approximately 5 kW of power, with its antennas in fully extended configuration it is 7.6 m (25 ft) wide. It would provide communications services throughout Japan, East Asia, South Asia, Australia and Hawaii.

Its payload is composed of sixteen 36 MHz plus another sixteen 27 MHz Ku-band transponders, for a total bandwidth of 1008 MHz. Its twelve of the 36 MHz transponders have a TWTA output power of 95 watts, the other four 36 MHz and the 27 MHz ones have 60 watts. It can configure four 36 MHz transponders into two 76 MHz with an effective 95 watts.

The Ku-band footprint covers Japan, Korea, most of China, Thailand, Vietnam, Laos, part of Indonesia, part of Malaysia and Hawaii.

== History ==
In June 1996, JSAT (since then merged into SKY Perfect JSAT Group) ordered JCSAT-5 from Hughes Space and Communications Company (now Boeing Satellite Development Center), to replace JCSAT-1 at the 150° East slot. The HS-601 based satellite would provide coverage to Japan, East Asia, Australia and Hawaii.

An Ariane 44P successfully launched JCSAT-5 on 2 December 1997 at 22:52:32 UTC from Centre Spatial Guyanais ELA-2 launch pad. Once successfully deployed, it was renamed as JCSAT-1B. It was driven to the 150° East position where it replaced JCSAT-1.

The satellite experienced an anomaly on 17 January 2007 on one of its thrusters. But after the operator designed a control scheme to handle the satellite without the failed thruster, it was put back into service.
