= JCSAT-RA =

Japanese communications satellite

- Mission type: Communication
- Operator: SKY Perfect JSAT Group
- COSPAR ID: 2009-044A
- SATCAT no.: 35755
- Mission duration: 15 years

Spacecraft properties
- Bus: A2100AXS
- Manufacturer: Lockheed Martin
- Launch mass: 4,000 kilograms (8,800 lb)

Start of mission
- Launch date: 21 August 2009, 22:09 UTC
- Rocket: Ariane 5ECA
- Launch site: Kourou ELA-3
- Contractor: Arianespace

Orbital parameters
- Reference system: Geocentric
- Regime: Geostationary
- Perigee altitude: 35,787 kilometres (22,237 mi)
- Apogee altitude: 35,798 kilometres (22,244 mi)
- Inclination: 0.04 degrees
- Period: 1436.11 minutes
- Epoch: 24 January 2015, 13:19:57 UTC

JCSAT-RA, previously known as JCSAT-12, is a Japanese geostationary communications satellite, which is operated by SKY Perfect JSAT Group.

== Details ==
It was ordered to replace the JCSAT-11 satellite which was lost in a launch failure on a Proton-M/Briz-M rocket in 2007, and is currently used as an on-orbit spare satellite; a role in which it replaced the older JCSAT-R spacecraft, providing a reserve for if one of the company's other satellites fails. It is a 4,000-kilogram (8,800 lb) satellite, which was constructed by Lockheed Martin based on the A2100AX satellite bus, with the same configuration as JCSAT-10 and JCSAT-11. The contract to build JCSAT-12 was awarded on 6 September 2007, the day after JCSAT-11 failed to reach orbit.

It was launched, along with the Australian Optus D3 satellite, by Arianespace. An Ariane 5ECA rocket was used for the launch, which occurred from ELA-3 at the Guiana Space Centre in Kourou, French Guiana. The launch took place at 22:09 GMT on 21 August 2009, at the start of a 60-minute launch window.

JCSAT-12 separated from its carrier rocket into a geosynchronous transfer orbit, from which raise itself to geostationary orbit using a LEROS-1C apogee motor. It has a design life of fifteen years, and carries forty two transponders; twelve G/H band, and thirty J band (US IEEE C and Ku bands respectively).

== See also ==
- 2009 in spaceflight
