= JCSAT-4B =

Geostationary communications satellite

- Names: JCSAT-13
- Mission type: Communication
- Operator: Indonesia Media Televisi (2012-2020); SKY Perfect JSAT Group (2012-present); Reliance Broadcasting Unlimited (2025-present)
- COSPAR ID: 2012-023A
- SATCAT no.: 38331
- Website: JSAT Official Page

Spacecraft properties
- Spacecraft: JCSAT-4B
- Bus: A2100
- Manufacturer: Lockheed Martin
- Launch mass: 4,528 kg (9,983 lb)

Start of mission
- Launch date: 22:13, June 15, 2012 (UTC)
- Rocket: Ariane 5 ECA VA206
- Launch site: Guiana Space Center ELA-3
- Contractor: Arianespace

Orbital parameters
- Regime: GEO
- Longitude: 124° East

Transponders
- Band: 32 × 27 Mhz and 12 × 36 MHz K_{u} band
- Bandwidth: 1,296 MHz
- TWTA power: 150 W

JCSAT-4B, known as JCSAT-13 (formerly known as Lippostar-1) before launch, is a geostationary communications satellite operated by SKY Perfect JSAT Group (JSAT). It was designed and manufactured by Lockheed Martin on the A2100 platform.

== Satellite description ==
The spacecraft was designed and manufactured by Lockheed Martin on the A2100 satellite bus. It had a launch mass of 4,528 kg (9,983 lb) and a 15-year design life. Like most satellites based on the A2100 platform, it uses a 460 N (100 lb_{f}) LEROS-1C LAE for orbit raising.

Its payload comprises thirty-two 27 MHz and twelve 36 MHz K_{u} band transponders for a total bandwidth of 1.296 GHz. The satellite is used primarily for multi-channel pay per view business. Besides the main beam, two steerable beams enable it to reconfigure its orbit services.

It's mainly used for broadcasting digital television channels. It has two fixed beams, the Japan Beam and the South East Asia Beam. The former offers coverage from the Middle and Near East through South West Asia, South East Asia, and Oceania, whereas the latter covers Indonesia and Malaysia. In addition to the two fixed beams, it offers two steerable beams to cover zones where demands have surpassed the fixed beam capacity.

== History ==
On April 16, 2009, JSAT made its seventh order for an A2100-based satellite from Lockheed, the JCSAT-13 and Lippostar-1. It would feature 44 K_{u} band transponders with two steerable antennas for on-orbit reconfiguration. It was to be launched in 2013 for the 124°East slot, which would replace JCSAT-4A. The next day, April 17, Arianespace announced they had secured the contract to launch JCSAT-13 on an Ariane 5 ECA.

On March 23, 2012, JSAT announced that the expected launch date for JCSAT-13 was May 15, and it would replace JCSAT-4A at the 124° East slot to offer the SKY PerfecTV! digital broadcasting service. As scheduled, on May 15 at 22:13 UTC, an Ariane 5 ECA successfully launched JCSAT-13 and Vinasat-2 to a geostationary transfer orbit. JCSAT-13 separated from the top berth at 22:39 UTC, and first signals were acquired at 23:20 UTC. After the launch success, JCSAT-13 was renamed JCSAT-4B.

On the same day of the launch, JSAT announced an agreement with the Lippo Group to use JCSAT-4B to offer a direct-to-home satellite TV broadcast service across Indonesia. After reaching the 124°East, it was commissioned into service on July 10, replacing JCSAT-4A.
