= JSAT Corporation =

First private Japanese satellite operator

- Native name

Japanese name
- Kanji: JSAT株式会社
- Literal meaning: JSAT Corporation
Transcriptions
- Revised Hepburn: JSAT kabushikigaisha
- Type: Corporation
- Industry: Telecommunication
- Genre: Satellite communications
- Predecessor: Japan Communications Satellite Company; Satellite Japan Corporation
- Founded: February 18, 1985; 41 years ago in Tokyo, Japan
- Defunct: September 1, 2008; 18 years ago
- Fate: Merged into SKY Perfect JSAT Group
- Successor: SKY Perfect JSAT Group
- Headquarters: 1-14-14, Akasaka, Minato-ku, Tokyo, Japan
- Key people: Masanori Akiyama, President and CEO
- Services: Telecommunications
- Total assets: ¥141,738 million (2008)
- Number of employees: 239 (2008)
- Parent: SKY Perfect JSAT Holdings Inc.

JSAT Corporation (JSAT) was the first private Japanese satellite operator, which owned the JSAT satellites, as well as operated and partially owned the N-Star with NTT DoCoMo. Its origins can be traced to the funding of Japan Communications Satellite Company (JCSAT) and Satellite Japan Corporation in 1985. Both companies merged into Japan Satellite Systems Inc. in 1993. In 2000 the company was renamed as JSAT Corporation and was listed in the First Section of the Tokyo Stock Exchange. On September 1, 2008, the company was merged into the SKY Perfect JSAT Group.

== History ==
With the opening of the Japanese satellite communications market to private investment, Japan Communications Satellite Company (JCSAT) and Satellite Japan Corporation were founded in 1985. In June of the same year, JCSAT awarded an order to Hughes Space and Communications for two identical satellites, JCSAT-1 and JCSAT-2, based on the spin-stabilized HS-393 satellite bus. JCSAT-1, the first commercial Japanese communications satellite, was successfully launched aboard an Ariane-44LP on March 6, 1989. Its brother was launched aboard a Commercial Titan III on January 1, 1990.

In 1992 N-Star was created as a joint venture between JSAT, NTT, NTT Communications and NTT DoCoMo for the supply of these latter two WIDESTAR satellite telephone and data packet service. JSAT would handle the satellite side of business and NTT DoCoMo would operate the payload.

Two identical satellites were ordered on 1992 from Space Systems Loral, N-STAR a and N-STAR b, for 1995 and 1996 on orbit delivery. They would be "switchboards in the sky" having S band, C band, K_{a} band and K_{u} band payload.

On 1993, Japan Communications Satellite Company and Satellite Japan Corporation merged to form Japan Satellite Systems Inc. (JCSAT). That same year, JCSAT orderedJCSAT-3, a third satellite from Hughes, using the HS-601 platform.

In 1995, JCSAT obtained a license for international service, and thus became a regional operator. On August 29, 1995 an Atlas IIAS successfully launched JCSAT-3 into orbit. On the same August 29 but on an Ariane 44P, N-STAR a was successfully launched. On December, JCSAT ordered a fourth satellite, JCSAT-4, with the same manufacturer and platform as JCSAT-3.

N-STAR b, launched on February 5, 1996, also aboard an Ariane 44P. The satellite telephone service was operational in March 1996. In June 1996, JCSAT ordered JCSAT-5, another HS-601-based satellite, and the twin JCSAT-6 in December, from Hughes. On February 17, 1997 JCSAT-4 was renamed JCSAT-R after being put in orbit by an Atlas IIAS.

By September 1997, both JCSAT and Space Communications Corporation (SCC) had requested the 110°East position. The Japanese government made both companies share the 100°E position, and thus both made a joint order in November 1998 for N-SAT-110 from Lockheed Martin. It was also called JCSAT-7 by JCSAT, and Superbird-5 by SCC. On December 2, an Ariane-44P successfully orbited JCSAT-5, which became JCSAT-1B. JSAT-6 was rechristened as JCSAT-4A after successfully being injected in its transfer orbit by an Atlas IIAS on February 16, 1999.

In 2000, the company name was changed to JSAT Corporation, and was listed on the First Section of the Tokyo Stock Exchange. In March 2000, JSAT received the NTT Communications interest in the N-STAR a and N-STAR b satellites. N-STAR c was ordered by NTT DoCoMo from Lockheed Martin and Orbital Sciences Corporation. Orbital would supply the spacecraft and procure launch services and Lockheed would deliver the payload an act as main contractor.

In April 2000, JSAT ordered JCSAT-8 from Boeing Satellite Development Center (which had acquired the HS-601 business from Hughes), to replace JCSAT-2 at the 154° East slot. N-SAT-110 was successfully launched October 6 by an Ariane 42L, at which point it was renamed JCSAT 110 and Superbird-D.

Horizons Satellite was originally an equal share joint venture with PanAmSat. It ordered its first satellite, Horizons-1/Galaxy 13 from Boeing in middle 2001. It was a 4 t (4.4 tons) spacecraft with 24 C band and 24 K_{u} band transponders. It had a 10 kW power generation capacity and 15 years of expected life.

Horizons-1 was successfully launched on October 1, 2003 aboard a Zenit-3SL rocket from the Ocean Odyssey platform in the Pacific.

An Ariane 44L successfully launched JCSAT-8 on March 28, 2002 from Guiana Space Centre. Once successfully deployed, it was renamed JCSAT-2A. N-STAR c was successfully launched on July 5, 2002 along Stellat 5 on an Ariane 5G.

JSAT switched satellite suppliers again and on April 30, 2003 awarded an order for JCSAT-9 to Lockheed Martin and its A2100AXS platform. A hybrid satellite with 20 C band, 20 K_{u} band, and 1 S-band transponders, it was expected for launch in 2005 for the 132° East slot. In May 2003 JSAT leased some of JCSAT-9 transponders to NTT DoCoMo to be used as N-STAR d. In August 2003 the JSAT acquired the NTT DoCoMo interest on N-STAR a and N-STAR b, whom then leased them back.

On April 20, 2004, JSAT ordered a second satellite from Lockheed, JCSAT-10. Based on the A2100AX platform, it would have a C band and K_{u} band payload and was expected to occupy the 128°East slot after its planned 2006 launch.

On August 30, 2005, Orbital Sciences announced that Horizons Satellite had ordered a small satellite based on the STAR-2 platform, Horizons-2, for the PanAmSat licensed orbital slot at 74°West. It would carry 20 Ku band transponders, generate 3.5 kW of power, weight around 2.3 t (2.5 tons) and was expected to be launched in 2007. The same year PanAmSat was taken over of by Intelsat, but it had no negative impact on the Horizons joint venture.

On October 3, 2005, JSAT ordered a third A2100-based satellite from LM, JCSAT-11. It would also have a C band and K_{u} band payload, and would be launched in 2007 to act as a backup for the whole JSAT fleet.

During 2006, JSAT successfully launched two satellites. On April 12, 2006 a Zenit-3SL successfully orbited JCSAT-9 from a platform on the Pacific Ocean. JSAT had leased some transponders to NTT DoCoMo to be used as N-STAR d. Once in its 132° East orbital position, it was known as JCSAT 5A and N-STAR d. Then, on October 11, an Ariane 5 ECA launched JCSAT-10 along Syracuse-3B into a transfer orbit. Upon successful deployment at 128°East longitude, it was renamed JCSAT-3A.

On May 1, 2007, Intelsat put the order for the Star-2-based Intelsat-15 satellite to Orbital Sciences. In a business deal, five of its 22 K_{u} band transponders were sold to JSAT. Under this arrangement, Intelsat-15 became JCSAT-85 for the JSAT payload, since it was to be positioned at the 85°E longitude.

The almost 19-year streak of successful JCSAT launches was ended when a Proton-M/Briz-M failed to orbit JCSAT-11 on September 5, 2007. A damaged pyro firing cable on the interstage truss prevented the second stage from controlling its direction, and the rocket and its payload crashed into the Kazakhstan steppes. Being lucky in misfortune, JCSAT-11 was simply an on-orbit backup and thus it had no operational impact on the fleet.

The same day of the launch failure, JSAT placed an order with Lockheed for an identical replacement, JCSAT-12, for launch in 2009. On September 19, 2007, they closed a deal with Arianespace for a launch slot with an Ariane 5 for its launch. On December 21, 2007, Horizons Satellite used an Ariane 5 rocket to launch Horizons-2.

In March 2008, SCC became a wholly owned subsidiary of SKY Perfect JSAT Group. At the SKY Perfect JSAT board meeting of August 6, 2008, it was resolved to merge SKY Perfect Communications, JSAT Corporation and Space Communications Corporation. This consolidated the Superbird fleet into JSAT and created the fifth satellite operator in the world at the time. The merge consolidated all companies under the SKY Perfect JSAT corporate entity, transferring all assets and operations and liquidating the absorbed companies legal entities.

== Satellites ==
Since the founding of the original companies in 1985 to its absorption by SKY Perfect JSAT Group in 2008 JSAT had the following fleet:

=== Own satellites ===
Satellite	COSPAR ID	Location	Regions served	Launch	Comments
JCSAT-1	1989-020A			March 6, 1989 (UTC)	
JCSAT-2					
JCSAT-3					
JCSAT-4/JCSAT-R					
JCSAT-5/JCSAT-1B					
JCSAT-6/JCSAT-4A					
JCSAT-7/JCSAT-110					
JCSAT-8/JCSAT-2A					
JCSAT-9/JCSAT-5A					
JCSAT-10/JCSAT-3A					
JCSAT-11					launch failure
JCSAT-12/JCSAT-RA					on order at time of merge
JCSAT-13/JCSAT-4B					
JCSAT-14					
JCSAT-15					
JCSAT-16					
JCSAT-17					

=== Shared satellites ===
- With NTT DoCoMo: N-STAR a and N-STAR b
- With Intelsat: Horizons-1/Galaxy 13, Horizons-2 (on order at time of merge) and JCSAT-85/Intelsat 15 (on order at time of merge)
- With B-SAT: JCSAT-110R (agreement for order at time of merge)
