= JCSAT-4A =

Geostationary communications satellite

- Names: JCSAT-6 (order to Feb 1999); JCSAT-4A (Feb 1999 onward)
- Mission type: Communications
- Operator: SKY Perfect JSAT Group
- COSPAR ID: 1999-006A
- SATCAT no.: 25630
- Mission duration: 14.5 years (planned); 27 years, 2 months and 28 days (elasped)

Spacecraft properties
- Spacecraft: JCSAT-6
- Spacecraft type: JCSAT
- Bus: HS-601
- Manufacturer: Hughes
- Launch mass: 2,900 kilograms (6,400 lb)

Start of mission
- Launch date: 16 February 1999, 01:45:26 UTC
- Rocket: Atlas IIAS (AC-152)
- Launch site: Cape Canaveral, LC-36A
- Contractor: International Launch Services (ILS)

Orbital parameters
- Reference system: Geocentric orbit
- Regime: Geostationary orbit
- Longitude: 124° East

Transponders
- Band: 32 K_{u} band
- Coverage area: Japan

JCSAT-4A, designated JCSAT-6 before launch, is a Japanese geostationary communications satellite which is operated by JSAT Corporation (now SKY Perfect JSAT Group). It is positioned in geostationary orbit at a longitude of 124° East, from where it is used to provide broadcasting and corporate network communications to Japan.

== Spacecraft description ==
JCSAT-6 was constructed by Hughes, based on the HS-601 satellite bus. It is equipped with 32 Ku-band transponders, and at launch it had a mass of 2,900 kg (6,400 lb), with an expected operational lifespan of fourteen and a half years.

== Launch ==
It was launched atop an Atlas IIAS launch vehicle flying from Launch Complex 36A at the Cape Canaveral Air Force Station. The launch occurred at 01:45:26 UTC on 16 February 1999, and successfully placed JCSAT-6 into a geostationary transfer orbit. From this orbit, the satellite raised itself into a geostationary orbit using an R-4D apogee motor. The final burn to complete its insertion into geosynchronous orbit occurred on 1 March 1999.

== See also ==
- 1999 in spaceflight
