= JCSAT-16 =

Geostationary communication satellite

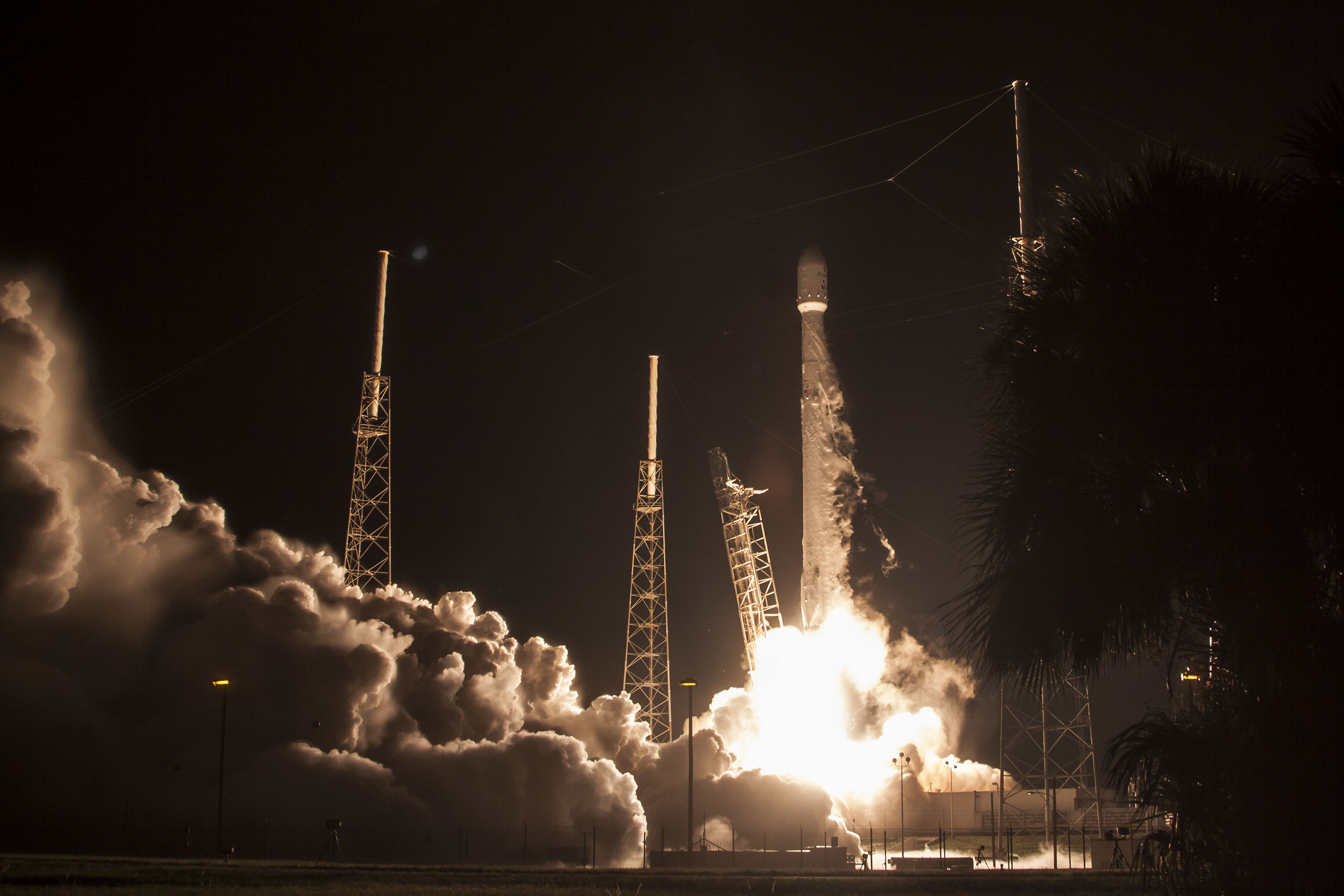
- JCSAT-16 being launched aboard Falcon 9 Flight 28.
- Mission type: Communication
- Operator: SKY Perfect JSAT Group
- COSPAR ID: 2016-050A
- SATCAT no.: 41729
- Website: Official Page

Spacecraft properties
- Spacecraft: JCSAT-16
- Bus: SSL 1300
- Manufacturer: SSL
- Launch mass: 4,600 kg (10,100 lb)
- Power: 8.5 kW

Start of mission
- Launch date: 05:26, August 14, 2016 (UTC)
- Rocket: Falcon 9 Full Thrust
- Launch site: Cape Canaveral SLC-40
- Contractor: SpaceX

Transponders
- Band: K_{u} band and K_{a} band

JCSAT-16 is a geostationary communications satellite operated by SKY Perfect JSAT Group and designed and manufactured by SSL on the SSL 1300 platform. It has a launch weight of 4,600 kg (10,100 lb), a power production capacity of 8.5 kW and a 15-year design life. Its payload is composed of K_{u} band and K_{a} band transponders. SKY Perfect JSAT Group plans to use JCSAT-16 as an in-orbit backup satellite for the Ku- and Ka-band satellites serving the Japanese market.

SpaceX's Falcon 9 Flight 28 propelled JCSAT-16 to a geosynchronous transfer orbit on August 14, 2016.

== History ==
In April 2014, SSL announced that it had been awarded a contract by SKY Perfect JSAT Group to manufacture two satellites: JCSAT-15 and JCSAT-16. The latter would be an 8.5 kW satellite with K_{u} band and K_{a} band payload for a broad range of orbital locations. It would be used as a back-up to the existing fleet.

On September 10, 2014, JSAT announced that it had signed a launch service contract with SpaceX for the launch of JCSAT-16 aboard a Falcon 9 rocket. On April 3, 2016, it was announced that Kratos had been selected for supplying a 9 m (30 ft) Ku-band antenna for JCSAT-16 TT&C at its Superbird Platform West ground station. Also, it was stated that the satellite had passed the critical design review.

On July 13, 2016, SSL delivered JCSAT-16 to the launch site in Cape Canaveral for launch processing and integration. This was the second launch of the year for JCSAT and also the second time the company used the SpaceX launch services, both times also happening in 2016. On August 4, 2016, JSAT announced that the expected launch date of JCSAT-16 was on August 14.

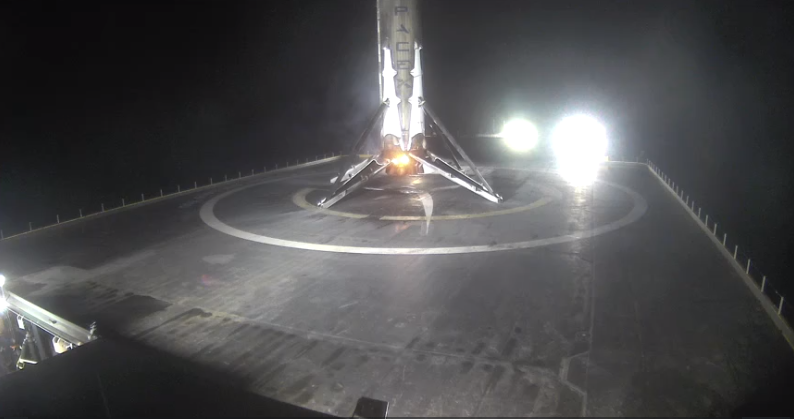
First stage landed after successfully delivering JCSAT-16

At the scheduled August 14 at 05:26 UTC, SpaceX successfully launched the JCSAT-16 satellite into a 184 km × 35,912 km × 20.85° orbit on a Falcon 9 rocket. The first stage successfully landed afterwards. At 5:58 UTC, the satellite separated from the upper stage. The satellite manufacturer, SSL, announced that 33 minutes after launch, the satellite was in good health and sending signals.

While JCSAT-16 was supposed to serve as on-orbit backup at the 124° East longitude position, it will be repositioned into service at the 162°East position to replace Superbird-B2, a satellite past its design life. Originally Superbird-8 was supposed to replace Superbird-B2, but a mishap during transport to the launch site in March 2016 meant that it would be delayed between one and two years.

On late September 2016, parts of Falcon 9 second stage reentered the atmosphere and landed over Java and Madura, Indonesia. Some parts like the Helium COPV (Composite Overwrapped Pressure Vessel) landed mostly intact and damaged an animal enclosure, but there was no further damage or harm.

== See also ==
- List of Falcon 9 launches
