= JCSAT-2A =

Geostationary communications satellite

- Names: JCSAT-2A (March 2002 onward); JCSAT-8 (April 2000 to March 2002)
- Mission type: Communications
- Operator: SKY Perfect JSAT Group
- COSPAR ID: 2002-015A
- SATCAT no.: 27399
- Website: JSAT official page
- Mission duration: 11 years (planned)

Spacecraft properties
- Spacecraft: JCSAT-2A
- Bus: BSS-601
- Manufacturer: Boeing Satellite Systems
- Launch mass: 2,460 kg (5,420 lb)
- Dimensions: 21 m × 7.6 m × 4.6 m (69 ft × 25 ft × 15 ft) (with solar panels and antennas deployed)
- Power: 3.7 kW

Start of mission
- Launch date: 29 March 2002. 01:29 UTC
- Rocket: Ariane 44L H10-3
- Launch site: Centre Spatial Guyanais, ELA-2
- Contractor: Arianespace

Orbital parameters
- Reference system: Geocentric orbit
- Regime: Geostationary orbit
- Longitude: 154° East

Transponders
- Band: Ku-band: 16 × 57 MHz; C-band: 11 × 36 MHz + 5 × 54 MHz
- Bandwidth: 1,578 MHz
- Coverage area: Japan, East Asia, Australia, Hawaii
- TWTA power: Ku-band: 120 watts C-band: 34 watts

JCSAT-2A, known as JCSAT-8 before launch, is a geostationary communications satellite operated by SKY Perfect JSAT Group (JSAT) which was designed and manufactured by Boeing Satellite Systems on the BSS-601 platform. It has Ku-band and C-band payload and was used to replace JCSAT-2 at the 154° East longitude. It covers Japan, East Asia, Australia and Hawaii.

== Satellite description ==
The spacecraft was designed and manufactured by Boeing Satellite Systems on the BSS-601 satellite bus. It had a launch mass of 2,460 kg (5,420 lb) a power production of 3.7 kW and an 11-year design life. Stowed for launch it measured 3.6 m × 2.7 m × 4.3 m (11.8 ft × 8.9 ft × 14.1 ft), with its solar panels and antennas deployed it measured 21 m × 4.3 m × 7.6 m (69 ft × 14 ft × 25 ft).

Its payload is composed of sixteen 57 MHz Ku-band plus eleven 36 MHz and five 54 MHz C-band transponders, for a total bandwidth of 1,578 MHz. Its high-power amplifiers had an output power of 120 watts on Ku-band and 34 watts on C-band.

The Ku-band footprint covers only Japan, while the C-band beams cover Japan, East Asia, Australia and Hawaii.

== History ==
In April 2000, JSAT ordered JCSAT-8 from Boeing (which had acquired the HS-601 business from Hughes), to replace JCSAT-2 at the 154° East slot. It would provide coverage to Japan, East Asia, Australia and Hawaii.

An Ariane 44L successfully launched JCSAT-8 on 29 March 2002 at 01:29 UTC from Centre Spatial Guyanais. Once successfully deployed, it was renamed JCSAT-2A.
