= Superbird-9 =

Geostationary communications satellite

- Mission type: Communications
- Operator: SKY Perfect JSAT
- Website: https://www.spacex.com/
- Mission duration: 15 years (planned)

Spacecraft properties
- Spacecraft: Superbird-9
- Spacecraft type: Superbird
- Bus: OneSat
- Manufacturer: Airbus Defence and Space

Start of mission
- Launch date: 2027 (planned)
- Rocket: Starship
- Contractor: SpaceX

Orbital parameters
- Reference system: Geocentric orbit (planned)
- Regime: Geostationary orbit

Transponders
- Band: Ku-band, Ka-band
- Coverage area: Japan, East Asia

Superbird-9, will be a geostationary communications satellite operated by SKY Perfect JSAT and designed and manufactured by Airbus Defence and Space. Superbird-9 will be based on Airbus's reconfigurable payload satellite bus OneSat, which can steer and reassign beams for different customers and services. It will be offering Ku-band and Ka-band communication services to the Japanese market. SKY Perfect JSAT, the main satellite operator in Japan, has selected Airbus to build Superbird-9 and contracted SpaceX to launch it on Starship.

== See also ==
- SKY PerfecTV! – Satellite TV division of the same owner corporation and major user of Superbird
