= JCSAT-17 =

Communications satellite

- Artist's impression of JCSAT-17
- Mission type: Communication
- Operator: SKY Perfect JSAT
- COSPAR ID: 2020-013A
- SATCAT no.: 45245
- Mission duration: 15 Years

Spacecraft properties
- Spacecraft: JCSAT-17
- Bus: LM-2100
- Manufacturer: Lockheed Martin Space
- Launch mass: 5857 kg
- Dimensions: 3.7 x 1.8 m
- Power: 20 kW

Start of mission
- Launch date: 18 February 2020, 22:19:00 UTC
- Rocket: Ariane 5 ECA
- Launch site: Kourou, ELA-3
- Contractor: Arianespace
- Deployment date: 18 February 2020

Orbital parameters
- Reference system: Geocentric orbit
- Regime: Geostationary
- Longitude: 136.0° East

Transponders
- Band: S-band; C-band; Ku-band
- Coverage area: Japan and Asia-Pacific

JCSAT-17 is a geostationary communications satellite operated by SKY Perfect JSAT Group. The satellite was designed and manufactured by Lockheed Martin Space on the LM-2100 platform, and was launched on 18 February 2020 on an Ariane 5. The satellite mainly provides service to Japan and the surrounding regions. Utilizing several S-band transponders with a flexible processor, the satellite has the capability to redirect communications capacity to concentrate on disaster relief efforts or other high-volume events.

== History ==
On 3 February 2016, SKY Perfect JSAT awarded Lockheed Martin Space Systems a contract to build JCSAT-17 using a modernized variant of the A2100 satellite bus. Eventually, this bus became known as LM-2100, which is expected to provide JCSAT-17 with a minimum 15-year lifespan.

On 4 January 2017, SKY Perfect JSAT announced it had contracted Arianespace to launch JCSAT-17 on an Ariane 5 ECA. The satellite was shipped to Kourou in January 2020.

== Spacecraft ==
JCSAT-17 was built by Lockheed Martin Space Systems on the LM-2100 platform. The spacecraft uses an 18-metre reflecting antenna to provide targeted S-band communications to Japan and surrounding regions. Once in orbit, the new satellite unfurled a 18-metre-diameter S-band mesh communications antenna made by L3Harris Technologies, formerly known as Harris Corp., of Melbourne, Florida. The spacecraft uses Ku-band transceivers for aircraft avionics communications.

== Launch ==
JCSAT-17 was launched from Guiana Space Centre ELA-3 on 18 February 2020 at 22:19:00 UTC aboard an Ariane 5 ECA launch vehicle. As with most Ariane 5 missions, the satellite was co-manifested and therefore shared a launch with the South Korean weather satellite GEO-KOMPSAT 2B.

Approximately 31 minutes after launch, JCSAT-17 separated from the SYLDA fairing and was released into geostationary transfer orbit.

The S-band and C-band payloads on JCSAT-17 will be used by NTT Docomo, a Japanese mobile phone company, to provide mobile connectivity across Japan and surrounding regions, according to Sky Perfect JSAT.
