= Optus D3 =

Australian geostationary communications satellite

- Mission type: Communication
- Operator: Optus
- COSPAR ID: 2009-044B
- SATCAT no.: 35756
- Website: http://www.optus.com.au/about/network/satellite/fleet/b3
- Mission duration: 15 years

Spacecraft properties
- Bus: Star-2.4
- Manufacturer: Orbital Sciences
- Launch mass: 2,401 kilograms (5,293 lb)

Start of mission
- Launch date: 21 August 2009, 22:09 UTC
- Rocket: Ariane 5ECA
- Launch site: Kourou ELA-3
- Contractor: Arianespace

Orbital parameters
- Reference system: Geocentric
- Regime: Geostationary
- Longitude: 156° east
- Perigee altitude: 35,778 kilometres (22,231 mi)
- Apogee altitude: 35,808 kilometres (22,250 mi)
- Inclination: 0.05 degrees
- Period: 1436.12 minutes
- Epoch: 23 January 2015, 19:12:10 UTC

Optus D3 is an Australian geostationary communications satellite, which is operated by Optus and provides communications services to Australasia. D3 was the third Optus-D satellite to be launched. It is a 2,401-kilogram (5,293 lb) satellite, which was constructed by Orbital Sciences Corporation based on the Star-2.4 satellite bus, with the same configuration as the earlier Optus D2 satellite.

It was launched, along with the Japanese JCSAT-12 satellite, by Arianespace. An Ariane 5ECA rocket was used for the launch, which occurred from ELA-3 at the Guiana Space Centre in Kourou, French Guiana. The launch took place at 22:09 GMT on 21 August 2009, at the start of a 60-minute launch window.

Optus D3 separated from its carrier rocket into a geosynchronous transfer orbit, from which it raised itself to geostationary orbit using an IHI -500-N apogee motor. It has a design life of fifteen years, and carries thirty two J band transponders (US IEEE Ku band).

Optus D3 will be visited by Mission Extension Vehicle-1, which will dock to Optus D3 and extend the mission of the satellite by 5-7 years.

== See also ==
- 2009 in spaceflight
