= JCSAT-3A =

Geostationary communications satellite

JCSAT-10 → JCSAT-3A
- Names: JCSAT-10 (Apr 2004 to Aug 2006) JCSAT-3A (Aug 2006 onward)
- Mission type: Communication
- Operator: SKY Perfect JSAT Group
- COSPAR ID: 2006-033A
- SATCAT no.: 29272
- Website: http://www.jsat.net/en/contour/jcsat-3a.html

Spacecraft properties
- Spacecraft: JCSAT-10
- Bus: A2100AX
- Manufacturer: Lockheed Martin
- Launch mass: 4,048 kg (8,924 lb)
- Dimensions: 27 m × 9 m (89 ft × 30 ft) with solar panels and antennas deployed.

Start of mission
- Launch date: 22:14, August 11, 2006 (UTC)
- Rocket: Ariane 5 ECA
- Launch site: GSC ELA-3
- Contractor: Arianespace

Orbital parameters
- Regime: GEO
- Longitude: 128°East

Transponders
- Band: 18 × 27 Mhz and 12 × 36 MHz K_{u} band 12 × 36 MHz C band
- Bandwidth: 1,350 MHz
- TWTA power: K_{u} band 127 W C band 48 W

JCSAT-3A, known as JCSAT-10 before launch, is a geostationary communications satellite operated by SKY Perfect JSAT Group (JSAT) which was designed and manufactured by Lockheed Martin on the A2100 platform.

== Satellite description ==
The spacecraft was designed and manufactured by Lockheed Martin on the A2100AX satellite bus. It had a launch mass of 4,048 kg (8,924 lb) and a 15-year design life. It would provide communications services throughout Japan and Asia. As most satellites based on the A2100 platform, it uses a 460 N (100 lb_{f}) LEROS-1C LAE for orbit raising. Its solar panels span 26.9 m (88 ft) when fully deployed and, with its antennas in fully extended configuration it is 8.6 m (28 ft) wide.

Its payload is composed of eighteen 27 MHz and twelve 36 MHz K_{u} band plus twelve C band transponders, for a total bandwidth of 1,350 MHz. Its high-power amplifiers had an output power of 127 Watts on K_{u} band and 48 Watts on C band.

== History ==
On April 20, 2004, JSAT ordered a satellite from Lockheed Martin, JCSAT-10. Based on the A2100AX platform, it would have a C band and K_{u} band payload and was expected to occupy the 128°East slot after its planned 2006 launch.

On August 11, 2006, an Ariane 5 ECA launched JCSAT-10 along Syracuse-3B into a transfer orbit. Upon successful deployment at 128°East longitude, it was renamed JCSAT-3A.
