= Superbird-B2 =

Geostationary communications satellite

- Names: Superbird-4
- Mission type: Communications
- Operator: Space Communications Corporation / SKY Perfect JSAT
- COSPAR ID: 2000-012A
- SATCAT no.: 26095
- Mission duration: 13 years (planned)

Spacecraft properties
- Spacecraft: Superbird-4
- Spacecraft type: Superbird
- Bus: HS-601 HP
- Manufacturer: Hughes Space and Communications
- Launch mass: 4,057 kg (8,944 lb)
- Dry mass: 2,460 kg (5,420 lb)
- Power: 5.5 kW

Start of mission
- Launch date: 18 February 2000, 01:04 UTC
- Rocket: Ariane 44LP H10-3 (V127)
- Launch site: Centre Spatial Guyanais, ELA-2
- Contractor: Arianespace

Orbital parameters
- Reference system: Geocentric orbit
- Regime: Geostationary orbit
- Longitude: 162° East

Transponders
- Band: 29 transponders: 23 Ku-band; 6 Ka-band
- Coverage area: Japan

Superbird-B2, also known by its pre-launch designation Superbird-4, is a Japanese communications satellite which is operated by SKY Perfect JSAT Group. It was originally built and launched for the Space Communications Corporation (SCC), which merged with JSAT Corporation (JSAT) in October 2008. It was constructed by Hughes Space and Communications and is based on the HS-601 HP satellite bus.

== Satellite ==
Space Communications Corporation (SCC) of Tokyo, Japan, ordered its second spacecraft from Hughes Space and Communications (HSC), on 6 April 1998. It was built at the Los Angeles plant, California, United States.

== Launch ==
Launch occurred on 18 February 2000, at 01:04 UTC. The launch was contracted by Arianespace, and used an Ariane 44LP H10-3 launch vehicle flying from ELA-2 at the Centre Spatial Guyanais. Following its launch and on-orbit testing, it was placed in geostationary orbit at 162° East, from where it provides communications services to Japan. It is equipped with thirty five transponders. Currently, the J-Alert (Japanese emergency warning system) is broadcast via Superbird-B2.
