= Maeda Corporation =

Japanese civil engineering and construction firm

- Maeda's current logo, designed by Saul Bass in 1991

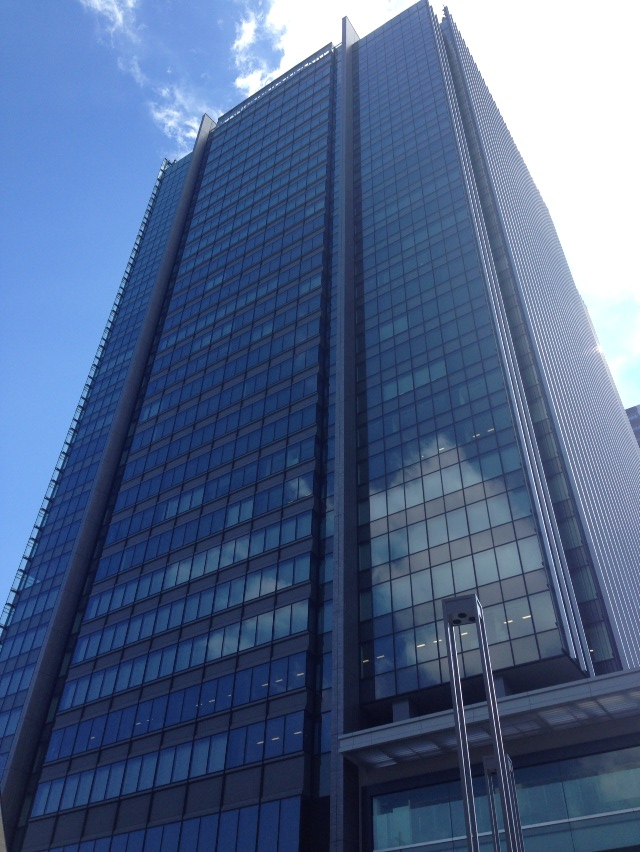
- Headquarters in Tokyo, Japan
- Type: Public KK
- Traded as: TYO: 1824
- ISIN: JP3861200008
- Industry: Construction; Engineering
- Founded: January 1919; 107 years ago)
- Founder: Matabee Maeda
- Headquarters: Fujimi, Chiyoda-ku, Tokyo 102-8151, Japan
- Area served: Worldwide
- Key people: Koichi Obara (Chairman); Soji Maeda (President)
- Services: Heavy construction; Civil engineering; Real estate management
- Revenue: ▲JPY 467.7 billion (FY 2017) (US$ 4.2 billion) (FY 2017)
- Net income: ▲JPY 23 billion (FY 2017) (US$ 208 million) (FY 2017)
- Number of employees: 4,133 (consolidated, as of March 2018)
- Website: Official website

Maeda Corporation (前田建設工業株式会社, Maeda Kensetsu Kougyo Kabushiki-gaisha) is a Japanese corporation which was established in 1919. Its main areas of business are building construction and civil engineering.

Maeda has domestic offices in eleven Japanese cities, and overseas offices in Thailand, Hong Kong, and India.

== History ==
Maeda became independent from Tobishima Gumi (飛島組) as Maeda Jimusho (前田事務所) in 1919. It became known as Maeda Corporation in 1946. In 1960, the company completed Tagokura Dam, one of the largest dam projects in Japan. Maeda has worked on other large public projects in Japan, including the Seikan Tunnel and the Tokyo Bay Aqua-Line.

Maeda is also well known in Hong Kong and has constructed such projects as the Hong Kong International Airport and Kap Shui Mun Bridge.

== Construction projects ==
Not a complete list.

- Kanmonkyo Bridge (1971)
- Seikan Tunnel (1987)
- Fukuoka Dome (1993)
- Kashiwazaki-Kariwa Nuclear Power Plant (1995)
- Hong Kong International Airport terminal (1998)
- Tsing Yi MTR Station (1998)
- Blue Line (Yokohama) Shimoiida Station (1997)

== See also ==
- Maeda Road
