= Footprint (satellite) =

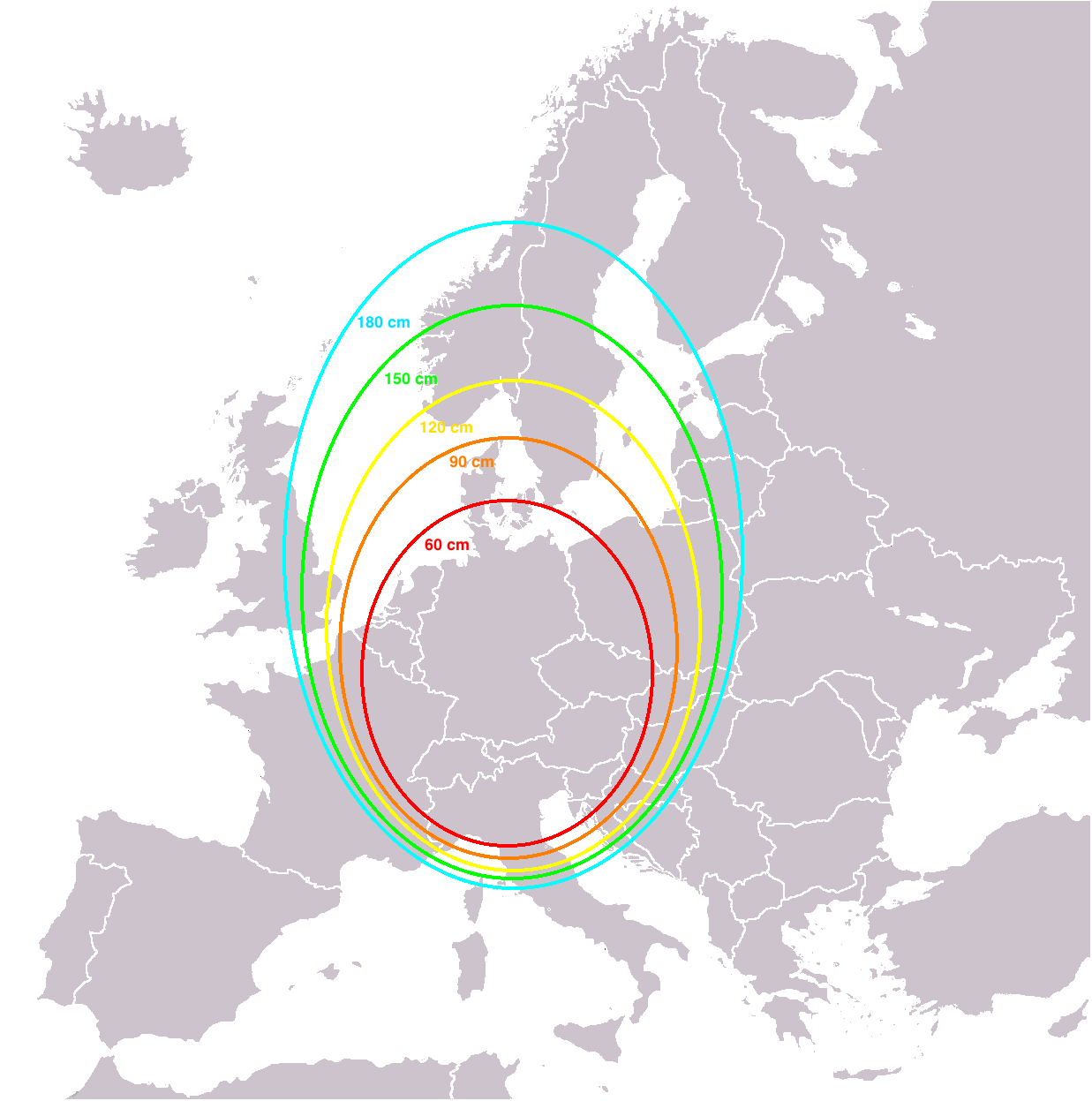
An example of an elliptical footprint with a reception area of Germany, Austria and Switzerland. The ellipses indicate the necessary antenna diameter for receiving in cm.

The footprint of a communications satellite is the ground area that its transponders offer coverage, and determines the satellite dish diameter required to receive each transponder's signal. There is usually a different map for each transponder (or group of transponders), as each may be aimed to cover different areas.

Footprint maps usually show either the estimated minimum satellite dish diameter required or the signal strength in each area measured in dBW.

== See also ==
- Satellite ground track
