= Syracuse (satellite) =

French military communications satellite constellation

Syracuse (SYstème de RAdioCommunication Utilisant un SatellitE; English: Satellite-based radio communication system) is a series of French military communications satellite constellations.

The Syracuse program is intended to enable safe and secure permanent communications between headquarters in mainland France and units deployed in theaters of operation around the world at all times (peace, crisis, major disaster...) as well as between the units themselves. It contributes to command, intelligence and logistics operations. Four generations of Syracuse constellations were deployed between 1984 and 2023.

== Syracuse I and II ==
Syracuse I and II were payloads on joint civilian-military satellite designs developed and operated by the French PTT, and were more commonly known by their civilian names Télécom 1 (3 satellites launched in 1984, 1985 and 1988) and Télécom 2 (4 satellites in 1991, 1992, 1995 and 1996). Matra Marconi Space, a development contractor on the Syracuse II, also worked on the British Skynet 4 military communications satellites.

== Syracuse III ==
This third generation of communications satellites was designed to meet the operational needs of the French Armed Forces for secure, long-distance communications that are resistant to the threat of electronic warfare. It comprises satellites, fixed ground stations, deployable terminals (land and naval) and modems to protect communications from jamming.

The novelty of this program lies in the fact that its installations, both in space and on the ground, are the exclusive property of the French Joint Defense Staff, ensuring the autonomy of the French armed forces in terms of satellite communications. The constellation consists of 3 satellites:

- the Syracuse-3A (launched on October 13, 2005)
- the Syracuse-3B (launched on August 11, 2006)
- the SICRAL 2 (launched on April 26, 2015), which is a third complementary satellite developed in cooperation with Italy

This system is completed by Comcept (complementary needs in projection and theater elongation communications) for "non-hardened" communications, which includes the Athena-Fidus satellite.

Syracuse III comprises 423 ground stations. This network is complemented on French Navy ships by the Telcomarsat commercial satellite system, which has equipped 54 ships since 2009.

== Syracuse IV ==
In 2018, the French Ministry of Defence announced the launch of the Syracruse IV program, aiming to develop of a constellation of three satellites to succeed the Syracruse III. The first two satellites, Syracuse 4A and 4B, were initially ordered, and the third, Syracuse 4C, would later follow. Surplus capacity will be sold to armed and security forces in Europe and elsewhere. Thales Alenia Space and Airbus Defence and Space were the selected contractors for the programme. The cost of the Syracuse 4 constellation is valued at €3.6 billion.

Weighing in at 3850 kg, Syracuse 4A is Europe's first electrically-powered military satellite. "This innovative propulsion system based on plasma propulsion engines, is the result of French know-how and represents a major technological advance for the space industry", the DGA explained. It adds: "Its advantages are numerous: used as a replacement for chemical propulsion, electric propulsion requires less fuel on board for the same service life, and significantly increases the satellite's carrying capacity, and therefore its communications payload. In particular, this technology will enable satellites to transmit in two different frequency bands". The Syracuse 4A and 4B satellites will offer military-grade X-band and Ka-band throughput of the order of 3 to 4 Gb/s (three times higher than that offered by Syracuse 3A and 3B), as well as greater resistance to cyber threats, electromagnetic pulses and jamming. They are equipped with environmental monitoring equipment and the ability to move to counter any aggression.

Syracuse 4A was launched on 24 October 2021 with an Ariane 5 ECA rocket from the Guiana Space Centre. The second one, Syracuse 4B was launched on 5 July 2023, which was the final launch of the Ariane 5 rocket, while the third one was scheduled to be launched by 2025.

However in April 2023, it was announced the first two satellites would be more than sufficient and that the last, Syracuse 4C, would be cancelled in favor of financing the European Union's IRIS² satellite internet constellation. It was also announced a program to develop the next generation of communications satellite constellation (Syracuse V) would be launched in the 2024-2030 French Military Planning Law to succeed the Syracuse 4A and Syracuse 4B satellites post-2035.

== See also ==
- French space program
- CNES
- Defense Satellite Communications System
- Skynet (satellite)
