= LEROS =

Family of chemical rocket engines

LEROS (Liquid Engine Royal Ordinance Space) is a family of chemical rocket engines manufactured by Nammo at Westcott, Buckinghamshire, United Kingdom. LEROS engines have been used as primary apogee engines for telecommunications satellites such as the Lockheed Martin A2100 as well as deep space missions such as Juno. The LEROS engines are made of niobium alloy, which is traditionally used for liquid rocket engines such as the attitude control thrusters of the Apollo Lunar Module.

== Types ==
Engine	Propellant	Thrust	I_{sp}	Comments
LEROS 1c	Hydrazine / MON	460 N	325	
LEROS 1b	Hydrazine / MON	635 N	318	
LEROS 2b	MMH / MON	407 N	318	
LEROS 4	MMH / MON	1100 N	323	Developed c. 2014 for European Space Agency's (ESA) Mars Robotic Exploration Program
LEROS 4-ET	MMH / MON	1310 N	323	Extended Thrust version of LEROS 4

== History ==
The family of engines derives from the LEROS 1 which was developed and qualified in the 1990s by Royal Ordnance. The in-space propulsion business was acquired by British Aerospace, then had a sequence of owners including American Pacific Corporation, Moog (from 2012) and Nammo (2017). As of 2011, more than 70 LEROS 1 series engines had been flown successfully.

== Uses ==
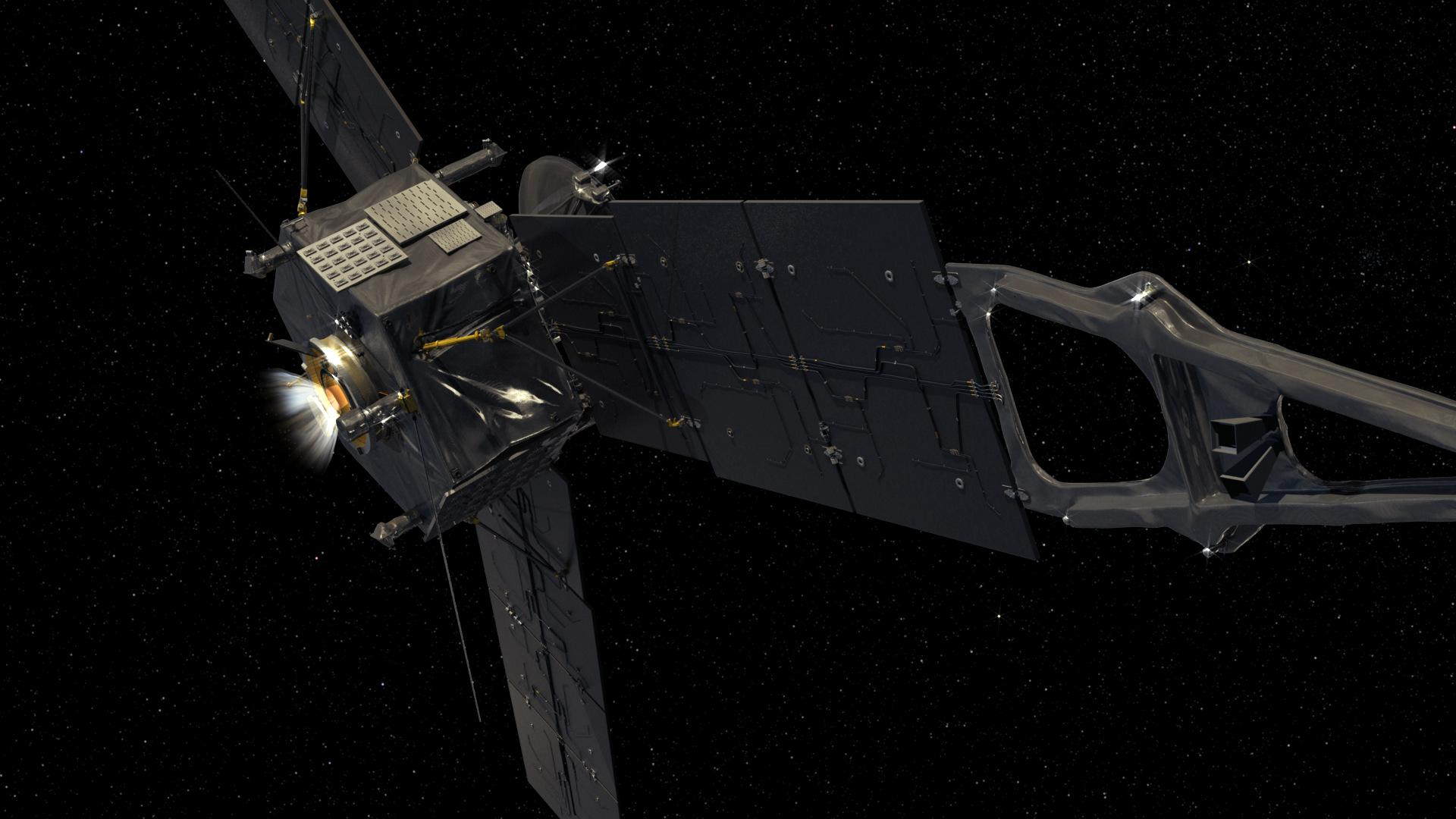
NASA's Juno spacecraft firing its LEROS 1b engine (computer-generated image).

LEROS engines have been used on a number of NASA and other space agency missions:

- NEAR Shoemaker (Near Earth Asteroid Rendezvous)
- Mars Global Surveyor
- MESSENGER
- Juno
- JCSAT-5A
- Sirius 4
- Nimiq 1
- SBIRS GEO 1 and GEO 2
- Intelsat 33e
- Beresheet lunar lander
- EnVision Venus orbiter (ESA)
- Blue Ghost lunar lander

== Incidents ==
There have been helium check valve problems on Juno leading to postponed maneuvers, and a failure after the first burn on Intelsat 33e requiring backup low-thrust jets to be used to bring the satellite to its intended orbit.
