= Thrusters (spacecraft) =

Spacecraft propulsion device

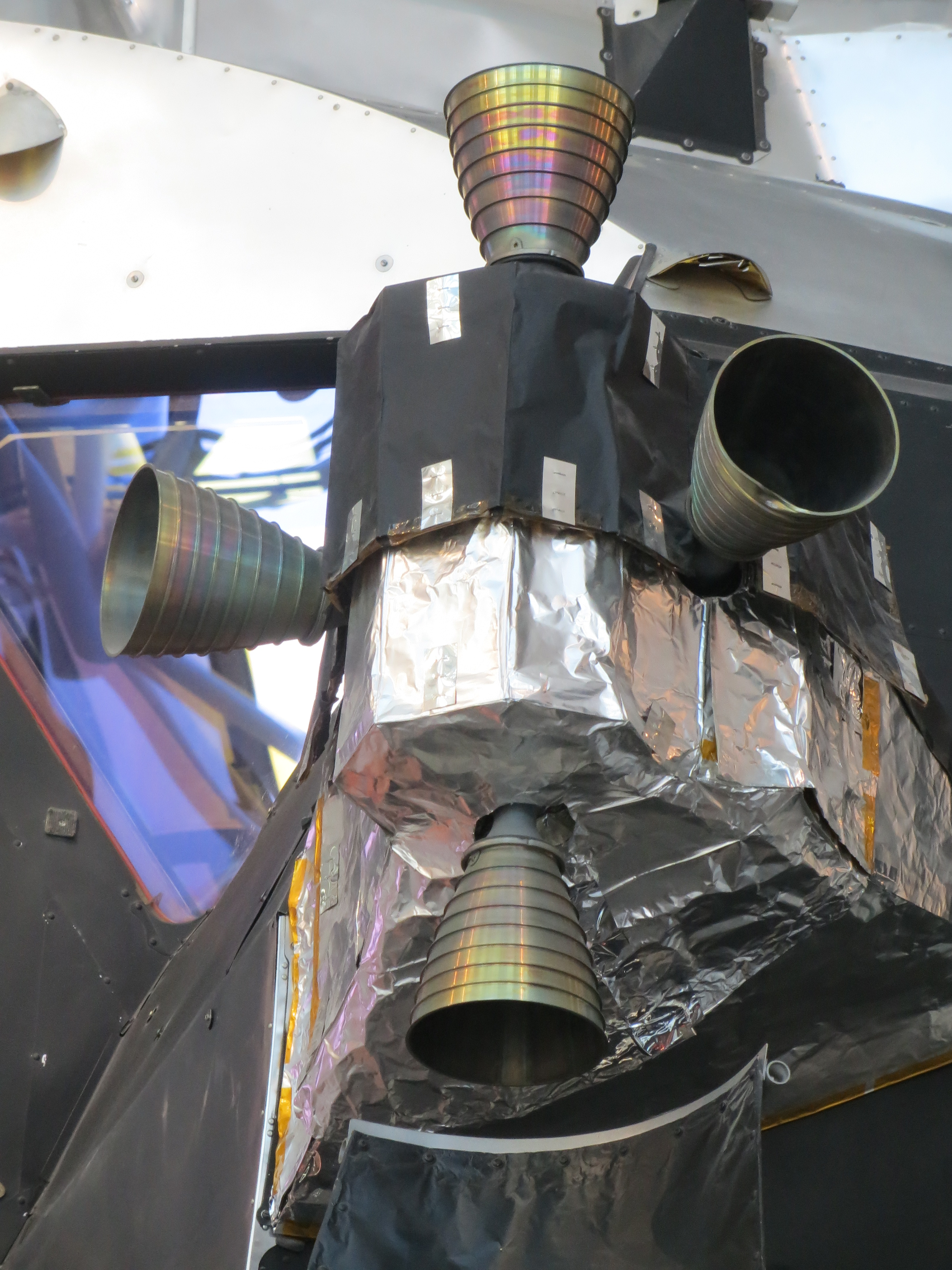
A set of chemical thrusters used on the Apollo Lunar module for reaction control.

A thruster is a spacecraft propulsion device used for orbital station-keeping, attitude control, or long-duration, low-thrust acceleration, often as part of a reaction control system. A vernier thruster or gimbaled engine are particular cases used on launch vehicles where a secondary rocket engine or other high thrust device is used to control the attitude of the rocket, while the primary thrust engine (generally also a rocket engine) is fixed to the rocket and supplies the principal amount of thrust.

Some devices that are used or proposed for use as thrusters are:

- Cold gas thruster
- Electrohydrodynamic thruster, using ionized air (only for use in an atmosphere)
- Electrodeless plasma thruster, electric propulsion using ponderomotive force
- Electrostatic ion thruster, using high-voltage electrodes
- Hall effect thruster, a type of ion thruster
- Ion thruster, using beams of ions accelerated electrically
- Magnetoplasmadynamic thruster, electric propulsion using the Lorentz force
- Pulsed inductive thruster, a pulsed form of ion thruster
- Pulsed plasma thruster, using current arced across a solid propellant
- RF resonant cavity thruster, an electromagnetic thruster using microwaves

== See also ==
- Liquid apogee engine – A liquid-propellant rocket used as the primary propulsion device on geostationary orbit satellites.
- Apogee kick motor – A solid-fuel rocket used as the primary propulsion device to circularize satellites inserted into a transfer orbit.
