= R-4D =

Marquardt-built small hypergolic rocket engine

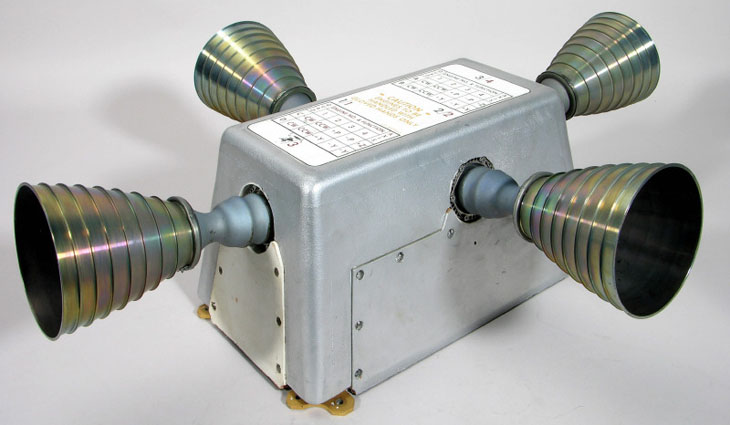
- RCS quad containing four R-4D thrusters, as used on the Apollo Service Module
- Country of origin: United States
- Manufacturer: Marquardt; Aerojet Rocketdyne
- Application: Reaction control system

Liquid-fuel engine
- Propellant: NTO / MMH
- Cycle: Pressure-fed

Performance
- Thrust, vacuum: 110 lb_{f} (490 N)
- Thrust-to-weight ratio: 13.74
- Chamber pressure: 100.5 psi (693 kPa)
- Specific impulse, vacuum: 312 s (3.06 km/s)

Dimensions
- Length: 12 in (300 mm)
- Diameter: 6 in (150 mm)
- Dry mass: 8 lb (3.6 kg)

Used in
- European Service Module; H-II Transfer Vehicle; Space Shuttle; Apollo CSM and LM; Cassini; Automated Transfer Vehicle

The R-4D is a small hypergolic rocket engine, originally designed by the Marquardt Corporation for use as a reaction control system thruster on vehicles of the Apollo lunar landing program. Aerojet Rocketdyne manufactures and markets modern versions of the R-4D.

== History ==
Developed as an attitude control thruster for the Apollo Command/Service Module and Lunar Module in the 1960s, each unit for the modules employed four quadruple clusters (pods). It was first flown on AS-201 in February 1966. Approximately 800 were produced during the Apollo program.

Post-Apollo, modernized versions of the R-4D have been used in a variety of spacecraft, including the U.S. Navy's Leasat, Insat 1, Intelsat 6, Italsat, and BulgariaSat-1. It has also been used on Japan's H-II Transfer Vehicle and the European Automated Transfer Vehicle, both of which delivered cargo to the International Space Station. It is also used on the Orion spacecraft.

== Design ==
The R-4D is a fuel-film cooled engine. Some of the fuel is injected longitudinally down the combustion chamber, where it forms a cooling film.

The thruster's design has changed several times since its introduction. The original R-4D's combustion chamber was formed from an alloy of molybdenum, coated in a layer of disilicide. Later versions switched to a niobium alloy, for its greater ductility. Beginning with the R-4D-14, the design was changed again to use an iridium-lined rhenium combustion chamber, which provided greater resistance to high-temperature oxidization and promoted mixing of partially reacted gasses.

The R-4D requires no igniter as it uses hypergolic propellants, which instantly combust when the fuel and oxidizer come into contact with each other.

It is rated for up to one hour of continuous thrust, 40,000 seconds total (over 11 hours), and 20,000 individual firings.

== Additional literature ==
- Remembering the Giants: Apollo Rocket Propulsion Development - Chapter Three & Appendix E
