= SKY Perfect JSAT =

Japanese satellite operator and satellite TV company

SKY Perfect JSAT Corporation

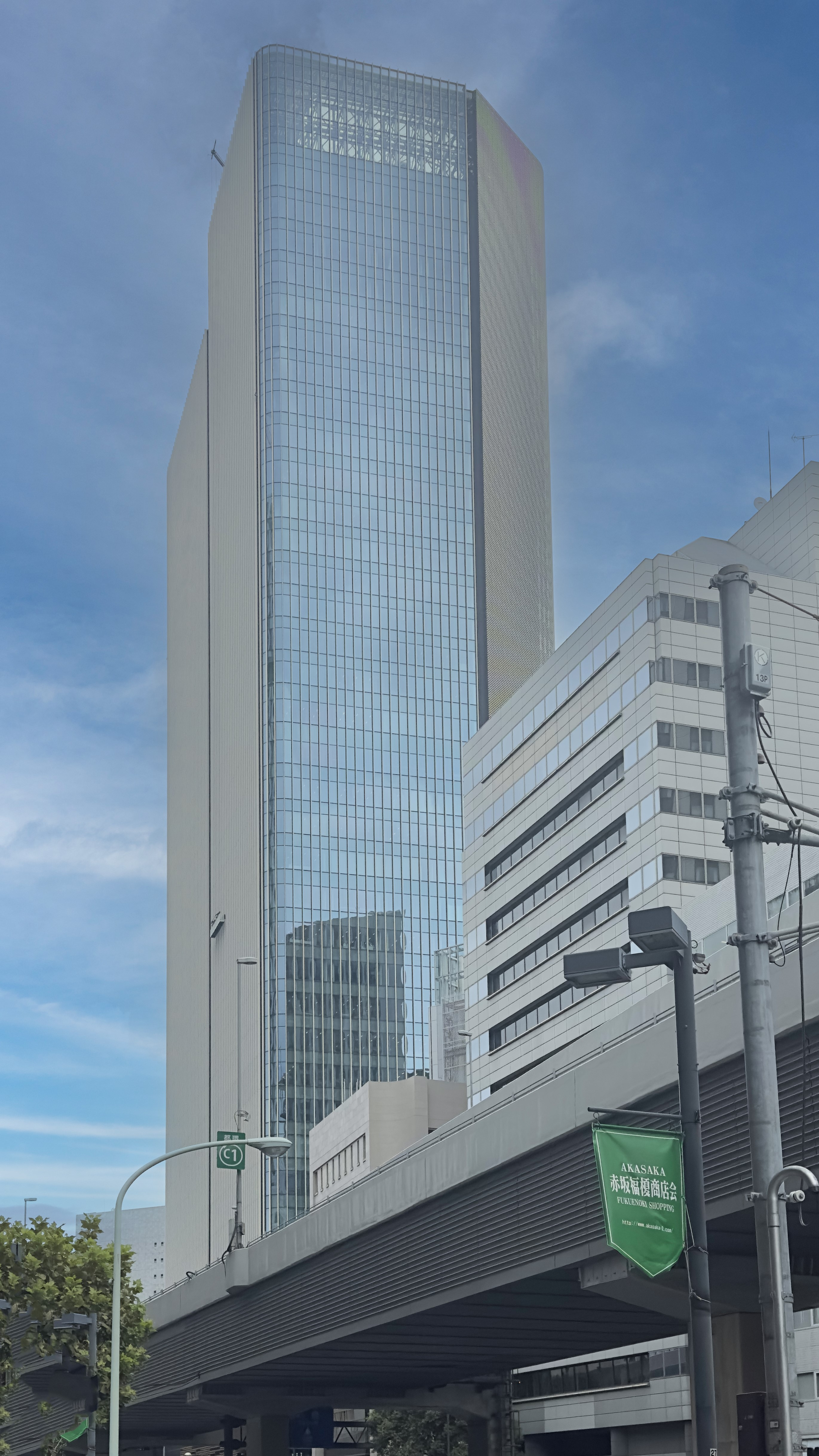
- Headquarters in Akasaka, Minato, Tokyo
- Native name: 株式会社スカパーJSAT
- Romanized name: Kabushiki gaisha Sukapā JEISATTO
- Formerly: DMC Planning Inc. (1994-1995); Japan Digital Broadcast Service Inc. (1995-2000); SKY Perfect Communications Inc. (2000-2007); SKY Prefect JSAT Corporation (2007-2008); SKY Perfect JSAT Holdings Inc. (2008-2026)
- Type: Public KK
- Traded as: TYO: 9412
- Industry: Telecommunication
- Predecessors: JSAT Corporation
- Founded: November 10, 1994; 31 years ago
- Headquarters: Akasaka, Minato, Tokyo, Japan
- Products: Fixed service satellite Direct broadcast satellite Pay TV
- Revenue: JPY 163.2 bn (FY14)
- Net income: JPY 13.5 bn (FY14)
- Owner: Itochu Fuji Partners (27.01%)
- Subsidiaries: SKY Perfect Entertainment; SKY Perfect Pictures (83%); JSAT International; JSAT Mobile Telecommunications
- Website: en.skyperfectjsat.space

SKY Perfect JSAT Corporation (Japanese: スカパーJSAT株式会社, Hepburn: Sukapā JSAT Kabushiki-gaisha) is a Japanese entertainment and broadcasting company that owns the DBS service, SKY PerfecTV!, alongside other businesses. Based in Minato, Tokyo, the company was formed in 1994.

== History ==
=== JSAT ===
The space and satellite business of the group dates to 1985, when its three predecessor companies were formed: Japan Communications Satellite Company (JCSC), Space Communications Corporation (SCC) and Satellite Japan Corporation (SJC). JCSAT-1, Japan's first private-sector communications satellite, was launched in 1989. JCSC and SJC merged in 1993, becoming Japan Satellite Systems, which changed its name to JSAT Corporation in 2000. JSAT was listed on the Tokyo Stock Exchange in the same year. SCC was acquired by the Sky Perfect JSAT Group in 2008.

=== Sky PerfecTV ===
The pay TV business of the group dates to 1994, when Japan Digital Broadcast Service was founded (under the temporary name "DMC Planning"). It began the PerfecTV! pay TV service in 1996. Japan Sky Broadcasting ("JSkyB") was founded in 1996 and merged with JDBS in 1998. In 2000 it acquired the Japan business of DirecTV.

=== Merger ===
JSAT and SKY Perfect transferred their stock to a joint holding company, SKY Perfect JSAT Corporation, on April 2, 2007. SKY Perfect JSAT Corporation changed its name to SKY Perfect JSAT Holdings Inc. on June 27, 2008. The SKY Perfect JSAT Corporation name was re-adopted by JSAT Corporation, SKY Perfect Communications and Space Communications Corporation when they merged on October 1, 2008.

=== SKY Perfect Pictures ===
In response to the rapidly expanding global Japanese animation market, SKY Perfect Pictures was established. This new company will be primarily focuses on planning, production investment, and sales of anime and related video content to capitalize on this expanding market. It started as an internal division within SKY Perfect JSAT. But to accelerate development of this business segment On April 1, 2024 the internal division was spun-off as a separate entity within the group and ITOCHU Corporation also invested in this new company to support its growth and also expand in the animation industry.

At the time of establishment in this new company, SKY Perfect JSAT holds an 83% ownership stake, while ITOCHU Corporation owns the remaining 17%. Later SKY Perfect JSAT decided to divest a 32% portion of its shares in SKY Perfect Pictures Inc. to iRightsport Inc., a fully owned subsidiary of ITOCHU Corporation. As a result of this transaction, iRightsport’s total stake rose to 49%, reflecting both the newly transferred shares and ITOCHU’s earlier investment. Despite this change, SKY Perfect JSAT maintains majority control with a 51% shareholding, ensuring that SKY Perfect Pictures remains a consolidated subsidiary within its group.

== Satellite fleet ==
The JSAT constellation is a communication and broadcasting satellite constellation currently operated by SKY Perfect JSAT Group. It has become the most important commercial constellation in Japan, and the fifth of the world. It has practically amalgamated all private satellite operators in Japan, with only B-SAT left as a local competitor.

It began in 1985 with the opening of the communication markets in Japan and the founding of Japan Communications Satellite Company, Satellite Japan Corporation, Space Communications Corporation. It grew by own investment, mergers and acquisitions of the parent companies. As of August 2016, it includes the fleets of three previously mentioned companies, Horizons Satellite and NTT DoCoMo and the DSN military network.
