= List of Ariane launches (1990–1999) =

This is a list of launches performed by Ariane carrier rockets between 1990 and 1999. The Ariane 4 was in service throughout this period, and conducted most launches, with the Ariane 5 making its first four flights in the second half of the decade.

== Launch statistics ==
=== Rocket configurations ===
- Ariane 4 40
- Ariane 4 42L
- Ariane 4 42P
- Ariane 4 44L
- Ariane 4 44P
- Ariane 4 44LP
- Ariane 5 G

=== Launch outcomes ===
- Failure
- Partial failure
- Success

== Launch history ==
=== 1990 ===
Date (UTC)	Variant	Configuration	Serial N^{o}	Payload	Orbit	Outcome	Remarks
22 January 1990, 01:35	Ariane 4	40	V-35/408	SPOT-2; Uosat-3/Oscar 14; UoSAT-4/Oscar 15; Oscar 16; Oscar 17; Oscar 18; Oscar 19	SSO	Success	
22 February 1990, 23:17	Ariane 4	44L	V-36/407	Superbird-B; BS-2X	GTO (planned)	Failure	Exploded due to blocked water line.
24 July 1990, 22:25	Ariane 4	44L	V-37/409	TDF-2; DFS-2	GTO	Success	
30 August 1990, 22:46	Ariane 4	44LP	V-38/410	Skynet 4C; Eutelsat 2F1	GTO	Success	
12 October 1990, 22:58	Ariane 4	44L	V-39/411	SBS-6; Galaxy-6	GTO	Success	
20 November 1990, 23:11	Ariane 4	42P	V-40/412	Satcom C1; GStar-4	GTO	Success	
=== 1991 ===
15 January 1991, 23:10	Ariane 4	44L	V-41/413	Italsat-1; Eutelsat 2F2	GTO	Success	
2 March 1991, 23:36	Ariane 4	44LP	V-42/414	Astra 1B; Meteosat 5	GTO	Success	
4 April 1991, 23:33	Ariane 4	44P	V-43/415	Anik E2	GTO	Success	
17 July 1991, 01:46	Ariane 4	40	V-44/416	ERS-1; Oscar 22; Orbcomm-X; Tubsat-A; SARA	SSO	Success	
14 August 1991, 23:15	Ariane 4	44L	V-45/417	Intelsat 605	GTO	Success	
26 September 1991, 23:43	Ariane 4	44P	V-46/418	Anik E1	GTO	Success	
29 October 1991, 23:08	Ariane 4	44L	V-47/419	Intelsat 601	GTO	Success	
16 December 1991, 22:19	Ariane 4	44L	V-48/420	Telecom 2A; Inmarsat 2F3	GTO	Success	
=== 1992 ===
26 February 1992, 23:58	Ariane 4	44L	V-49/421	Superbird-B1; Arabsat-1C	GTO	Success	
15 April 1992, 23:25	Ariane 4	44L+	V-50/422	Telecom 2B; Inmarsat-2F4	GTO	Success	
9 July 1992, 22:42	Ariane 4	44L	V-51/423	Insat-2A; Eutelsat 2F4	GTO	Success	
10 August 1992, 23:08	Ariane 4	42P	V-52/424	TOPEX/Poseidon; Oscar 23; S80/T	SSO	Success	
10 September 1992, 23:04	Ariane 4	44LP+	V-53/425	Hispasat 1A; Satcom C3	GTO	Success	
28 October 1992, 00:15	Ariane 4	42P+	V-54/426	Galaxy-7	GTO	Success	
1 December 1992, 22:48	Ariane 4	42P+	V-55/427	Superbird A1	GTO	Success	
=== 1993 ===
12 May 1993, 00:56	Ariane 4	42L	V-56/428	Astra 1C; Arsene	GTO	Success	Only launch of Ariane 42L
25 June 1993, 00:18	Ariane 4	42P+	V-57/430	Galaxy-4	GTO	Success	
22 July 1993, 22:58	Ariane 4	44L	V-58/429	Hispasat 1B; Insat-2B	GTO	Success	
26 September 1993, 01:45	Ariane 4	40	V-59/431	SPOT-3; Stella; Kitsat-2; Posat-1; Healthsat-2; ITAMsat; Eyesat-1	SSO	Success	
22 October 1993, 06:46	Ariane 4	44LP	V-60/432	Intelsat 701	GTO	Success	
20 November 1993, 01:17	Ariane 4	44LP	V-61/433	Solidaridad 1 Meteosat 6	GTO	Success	
18 December 1993, 01:27	Ariane 4	44L	V-62/434	DBS-1; Thaicom-1	GTO	Success	
=== 1994 ===
24 January 1994, 21:37	Ariane 4	44LP	V-63/435	Eutelsat 2F5; Turksat 1A	GTO (planned)	Failure	Third stage turbopump malfunction
17 June 1994, 07:07	Ariane 4	44LP	V-64/436	Intelsat 702; STRV 1A & 1B	GTO	Success	
8 July 1994, 23:05	Ariane 4	44L	V-65/437	Panamsat-2; Yuri-3N	GTO	Success	
10 August 1994, 23:05	Ariane 4	44LP	V-66/438	Brasilsat B1; Turksat 1B	GTO	Success	
9 September 1994, 00:29	Ariane 4	42L+	V-67/439	Telstar 402	GTO	Success	Only launch of Ariane 42L+
8 October 1994, 01:07	Ariane 4	44L	V-68/440	Solidaridad-2; Thaicom-2	GTO	Success	
1 November 1994, 00:37	Ariane 4	42P	V-69/441	Astra 1D	GTO	Success	
1 December 1994, 22:57	Ariane 4	42P	V-70/442	Panamsat-3	GTO (planned)	Failure	Third stage gas generator malfunction
=== 1995 ===
28 March 1995, 11:19	Ariane 4	44LP+	V-71/443	Brasilsat B2; Hot Bird 1	GTO	Success	
21 April 1995, 01:44	Ariane 4	40+	V-72/444	ERS-2	SSO	Success	
17 May 1995, 06:34	Ariane 4	44LP	V-73/445	Intelsat 706	GTO	Success	
10 June 1995, 00:24	Ariane 4	42P	V-74/446	DBS-3	GTO	Success	
7 July 1995, 16:23	Ariane 4	40	V-75/447	Hélios 1A; Cerise; LBSAT/UPM-Sat 1	SSO	Success	
3 August 1995, 22:58	Ariane 4	42L-3	V-76/448	PanAmSat-4	GTO	Success	Maiden flight of Ariane 42L-3
29 August 1995, 06:41	Ariane 4	44P	V-77/449	N-Star A	GTO	Success	
24 September 1995, 00:06	Ariane 4	42L-3	V-78/450	Telstar 402R	GTO	Success	
19 October 1995, 00:28	Ariane 4	42L-3	V-79/451	Astra 1E	GTO	Success	
17 November 1995, 01:20	Ariane 4	44P	V-80/452	ISO	HEO	Success	
6 December 1995, 23:23	Ariane 4	44L	V-81/453	Telecom 2C; Insat 2C	GTO	Success	
=== 1996 ===
12 January 1996, 23:10	Ariane 4	44L	V-82/454	Panamsat-3R; Measat-1	GTO	Success	
5 February 1996, 07:19	Ariane 4	44P	V-83/455	N-STAR b	GTO	Success	
14 March 1996, 07:11	Ariane 4	44LP	V-84/456	Intelsat 707	GTO	Success	
20 April 1996, 22:36	Ariane 4	42P	V-85/457	MSAT-1	GTO	Success	
16 May 1996, 01:56	Ariane 4	44L	V-86/458	Palapa C2; AMOS-1	GTO	Success	
4 June 1996, 12:34	Ariane 5	G	V-88/501	Cluster FM-1; Cluster FM-2; Cluster FM-3; Cluster FM-4	HEO (Planned)	Failure	Maiden flight of Ariane 5, guidance system failed due to programming error, destroyed by range safety
15 June 1996, 06:55	Ariane 4	44P	V-87/459	Intelsat 709	GTO	Success	
9 July 1996, 22:24	Ariane 4	44L	V-89/460	Arabsat-2A; Türksat 1C	GTO	Success	
8 August 1996, 22:49	Ariane 4	44L	V-90/461	Italsat F2; Telecom 2D	GTO	Success	
11 September 1996, 00:00	Ariane 4	42P	V-91/462	Echostar-2	GTO	Success	
13 November 1996, 22:40	Ariane 4	44L	V-92/463	Arabsat-2B; Measat-2	GTO	Success	
=== 1997 ===
30 January 1997, 22:04	Ariane 4	44L	V-93/465	GE-2; Nahuel 1A	GTO	Success	
1 March 1997, 01:07	Ariane 4	44P	V-94/464	Intelsat 801	GTO	Success	
16 April 1997, 23:08	Ariane 4	44LP	V-95/467	Thaicom 3 BSAT 1a	GTO	Success	
3 June 1997, 23:20	Ariane 4	44L	V-97/468	Inmarsat 3F4; Insat 2D	GTO	Success	
25 June 1997, 23:44	Ariane 4	44P	V-96/466	Intelsat 802	GTO	Success	
8 August 1997, 06:46	Ariane 4	44P	V-98/469	Panamsat-6	GTO	Success	
2 September 1997, 22:21	Ariane 4	44LP	V-99/470	Hot Bird 3 Meteosat 7	GTO	Success	
23 September 1997, 23:58	Ariane 4	42L-3	V-100/471	Intelsat 803	GTO	Success	
30 October 1997, 13:43	Ariane 5	G	V-101/502	Maqsat-H/TEAMSAT; Maqsat-B; YES	GTO (planned)	Partial failure	Upper stage underperformed, placed satellites in lower orbit than planned
12 November 1997, 21:48	Ariane 4	44L	V-102/472	Sirius-2; Cakrawarta-1	GTO	Success	
2 December 1997, 22:52	Ariane 4	44P	V-103/473	JCSAT-5; Equator-S	GTO	Success	
22 December 1997, 00:16	Ariane 4	42L-3	V-104/474	Intelsat 804	GTO	Success	
=== 1998 ===
4 February 1998, 23:29	Ariane 4	44LP	V-105/475	Brasilsat B3; Inmarsat 3F5	GTO	Success	
27 February 1998, 22:38	Ariane 4	42P	V-106/476	Hot Bird 4	GTO	Success	
24 March 1998, 01:46	Ariane 4	40	V-107/477	SPOT-4	SSO	Success	
28 April 1998, 22:53	Ariane 4	44P	V-108/478	Nilesat-1; BSAT-1B	GTO	Success	
25 August 1998, 23:07	Ariane 4	44P	V-109/479	ST-1	GTO	Success	
16 September 1998, 06:31	Ariane 4	44LP	V-110/480	Panamsat 7	GTO	Success	
5 October 1998, 22:51	Ariane 4	44L	V-111/481	Eutelsat W2; Sirius-3	GTO	Success	
21 October 1998, 16:37	Ariane 5	G	V-112/503	Maqsat-3/ARD	GTO	Success	ARD deployed on suborbital trajectory
28 October 1998, 22:15	Ariane 4	44L	V-113/482	Afristar; GE-5	GTO	Success	
6 December 1998, 00:43	Ariane 4	42L-3	V-114/483	Satmex 5	GTO	Success	
22 December 1998, 01:08	Ariane 4	42L-3	V-115/484	PanAmSat-6B	GTO	Success	
=== 1999 ===
26 February 1999, 22:44:00	Ariane 4	44L (# 28)	V-116/485	Arabsat-3A; Skynet 4E	GTO	Success	
2 April 1999, 22:03	Ariane 4	42P	V-117/486	Insat-2E	GTO	Success	
12 August 1999, 22:52	Ariane 4	42P	V-118/487	Telkom-1	GTO	Success	
4 September 1999, 22:34	Ariane 4	42P	V-120/488	Koreasat-3	GTO	Success	
25 September 1999, 06:29	Ariane 4	44LP	V-121/489	Telstar 7	GTO	Success	
19 October 1999, 06:22	Ariane 4	44LP	V-122/490	Orion 2	GTO	Success	
13 November 1999, 22:54	Ariane 4	44LP	V-123/491	GE-4	GTO	Success	
3 December 1999, 16:22	Ariane 4	40	V-124/492	Hélios 1B; Clémentine	SSO	Success	
10 December 1999, 14:32	Ariane 5	G	V-119/504	XMM-Newton	HEO	Success	
22 December 1999, 00:50	Ariane 4	44L-3	V-125/493	Galaxy-11	GTO	Success	

== See also ==
- McDowell, Jonathan. "Launch Log". Jonathan's Space Page.
- McDowell, Jonathan. "Satellite Catalog". Jonathan's Space Page.
- Wade, Mark. "Ariane". Encyclopedia Astronautica. Archived from the original on 7 September 2008.
