= List of Ariane launches (2000–2009) =

This is a list of launches performed by Ariane carrier rockets between 2000 and 2009. During this period, the Ariane 4 was retired from service in favour of the Ariane 5.

== Launch statistics ==
=== Rocket configurations ===
- Ariane 4 42L
- Ariane 4 42P
- Ariane 4 44L
- Ariane 4 44P
- Ariane 4 44LP
- Ariane 5 G
- Ariane 5 G+
- Ariane 5 GS
- Ariane 5 ECA
- Ariane 5 ES

=== Launch outcomes ===
- Failure
- Partial failure
- Success

== Launch history ==
=== 2000 ===
| Flight № | Date Time (UTC) | Rocket type Serial № | Launch site | Payload | Payload mass | Orbit | Customers | Launch outcome |
| V-126 | 25 January 2000; 01:04 | Ariane 4 42L-3; 494 | Guiana; ELA-2 | Galaxy 10R | | GTO | | Success |
| V-127 | 18 February 2000; 01:04 | Ariane 4 44LP; 495 | Guiana; ELA-2 | Superbird 4 | | GTO | | Success |
| V-128 | 21 March 2000; 23:28 | Ariane 5 G 505 | Guiana; ELA-3 | Insat 3B; AsiaStar | | GTO | | Success |
| V-129 | 19 April 2000; 00:29 | Ariane 4 42L-3; 496 | Guiana; ELA-2 | Galaxy 4R | | GTO | | Success |
| V-131 | 17 August 2000; 23:16 | Ariane 4 44LP-3; 4097 | Guiana; ELA-2 | Brasilsat B4; Nilesat 102 | | GTO | | Success |
| V-132 | 6 September 2000; 22:33 | Ariane 4 44P; 4098 | Guiana; ELA-2 | Eutelsat W1 | | GTO | | Success |
| V-130 | 14 September 2000; 22:54 | Ariane 5 G 506 | Guiana; ELA-3 | Astra 2B; GE-7 | | GTO | | Success |
| V-133 | 6 October 2000; 23:00 | Ariane 4 42L-3; 4099 | Guiana; ELA-2 | N-SAT 110 | | GTO | | Success |
| V-134 | 29 October 2000; 05:59 | Ariane 4 44LP-3; 4100 | Guiana; ELA-2 | EuropeStar F1 | | GTO | | Success |
| V-135 | 16 November 2000; 01:07 | Ariane 5 G 507 | Guiana; ELA-2 | PanAmSat-1R; Amsat-P3D; STRV 1C; STRV 1D | | GTO | | Success |
| V-136 | 21 November 2000; 23:56 | Ariane 4 44L-3; 4102 | Guiana; ELA-2 | Anik F1 | | GTO | | Success |
| V-138 | 20 December 2000; 00:26 | Ariane 5 G 508 | Guiana; ELA-3 | Astra 2D; GE-8; LDREX | | GTO | | Success |
=== 2001 ===
| Flight № | Date Time (UTC) | Rocket type Serial № | Launch site | Payload | Payload mass | Orbit | Customers | Launch outcome |
| V-137 | 10 January 2001; 22:09 | Ariane 4 44P-3; 4101 | Guiana; ELA-2 | Turksat 2A | | GTO | | Success |
| V-139 | 7 February 2001; 23:05 | Ariane 4 44L-3; 4103 | Guiana; ELA-2 | Sicral-1; Skynet 4F | | GTO | | Success |
| V-140 | 8 March 2001; 22:51 | Ariane 5 G 509 | Guiana; ELA-3 | Eurobird-1; BSat-2a | | GTO | | Success |
| V-141 | 9 June 2001; 06:45 | Ariane 4 44L-3; 4104 | Guiana; ELA-2 | Intelsat 901 | | GTO | | Success |
| V-142 | 12 July 2001; 21:58 | Ariane 5 G 510 | Guiana; ELA-3 | Artemis; BSat-2b | | MEO (achieved) GTO (planned) | | Partial failure |
| V-142 | Upper stage underperformed, payloads placed in useless orbit. Artemis raised to correct orbit at expense of operational fuel, BSat unrecoverable | | | | | | | |
| V-143 | 30 August 2001; 06:46 | Ariane 4 44L-3; 4105 | Guiana; ELA-2 | Intelsat 902 | | GTO | | Success |
| V-144 | 25 September 2001; 23:21 | Ariane 4 44P; 4106 | Guiana; ELA-2 | Atlantic Bird 2 | | GTO | | Success |
| V-146 | 27 November 2001; 05:59 | Ariane 4 44LP-3; 4107 | Guiana; ELA-2 | DirecTV-4S | | GTO | | Success |
=== 2002 ===
| Flight № | Date Time (UTC) | Rocket type Serial № | Launch site | Payload | Payload mass | Orbit | Customers | Launch outcome |
| V-147 | 23 January 2002; 23:46 | Ariane 4 42L-3; 4108 | Guiana; ELA-2 | Insat 3C | | GTO | | Success |
| V-147 | Final flight of Ariane 42L-3 | | | | | | | |
| V-148 | 23 February 2002; 06:59 | Ariane 4 44L; 4109 | Guiana; ELA-2 | Intelsat 904 | | GTO | | Success |
| V-145 | 1 March 2002; 01:07 | Ariane 5 G 511 | Guiana; ELA-3 | Envisat | | SSO | | Success |
| V-149 | 29 March 2002; 01:29 | Ariane 4 44L; 4110 | Guiana; ELA-2 | Astra 3A; JCSAT-8 | | GTO | | Success |
| V-150 | 16 April 2002; 23:02 | Ariane 4 44L-3; 4111 | Guiana; ELA-2 | NSS-7 | | GTO | | Success |
| V-151 | 4 May 2002; 01:31 | Ariane 4 42P; 4112 | Guiana; ELA-2 | SPOT-5; IDEFIX | | SSO | | Success |
| V-152 | 5 June 2002; 06:44 | Ariane 4 44L; 4113 | Guiana; ELA-2 | Intelsat 905 | | GTO | | Success |
| V-153 | 5 July 2002; 23:22 | Ariane 5 G 512 | Guiana; ELA-3 | Stellat-5; NStar-C | | GTO | | Success |
| V-155 | 28 August 2002; 22:45 | Ariane 5 G 513 | Guiana; ELA-3 | Atlantic Bird 1 MSG-1; MFD | | GTO | | Success |
| V-154 | 6 September 2002; 06:44 | Ariane 4 44L; 4114 | Guiana; ELA-2 | Intelsat 906 | | GTO | | Success |
| V-157 | 11 December 2002; 22:22 | Ariane 5 ECA; 517 | Guiana; ELA-3 | Hot Bird 7 Stentor; MFD-A; MFD-B | | GTO (planned) | | Failure |
| V-157 | Maiden flight of Ariane 5ECA, first stage engine failure, destroyed by range safety | | | | | | | |
| V-156 | 17 December 2002; 23:04 | Ariane 4 44L; 4115 | Guiana; ELA-2 | NSS-6 | | GTO | | Success |
=== 2003 ===
| Flight № | Date Time (UTC) | Rocket type Serial № | Launch site | Payload | Payload mass | Orbit | Customers | Launch outcome |
| V-159 | 15 February 2003; 07:00 | Ariane 4 44L; 4116 | Guiana; ELA-2 | Intelsat 907 | | GTO | | Success |
| V-159 | Final flight of Ariane 4 | | | | | | | |
| V-160 | 9 April 2003; 22:52 | Ariane 5 G 514 | Guiana; ELA-3 | Insat 3A; Galaxy 12 | | GTO | | Success |
| V-161 | 11 June 2003; 22:38 | Ariane 5 G 515 | Guiana; ELA-3 | Optus C1; BSat 2c | | GTO | | Success |
| V-162 | 27 September 2003; 23:14 | Ariane 5 G 516 | Guiana; ELA-3 | Insat 3E eBird-1; SMART-1 | | GTO | | Success |
| V-162 | Final flight of Ariane 5G | | | | | | | |
=== 2004 ===
| Flight № | Date Time (UTC) | Rocket type Serial № | Launch site | Payload | Payload mass | Orbit | Customers | Launch outcome |
| V-158 | 2 March 2004; 07:17 | Ariane 5 G+ 518 | Guiana; ELA-3 | Rosetta | | Heliocentric | | Success |
| V-158 | Maiden flight of Ariane 5G+ | | | | | | | |
| V-163 | 18 July 2004; 00:44 | Ariane 5 G+ 519 | Guiana; ELA-3 | Anik F3 | | GTO | | Success |
| V-165 | 18 December 2004; 16:26 | Ariane 5 G+ 520 | Guiana; ELA-3 | Helios 2A; Essaim-1; Essaim-2; Essaim-3; Essaim-4; PARASOL; Nanosat 01 | | SSO | | Success |
| V-165 | Final flight of Ariane 5G+ | | | | | | | |
=== 2005 ===
| Flight № | Date Time (UTC) | Rocket type Serial № | Launch site | Payload | Payload mass | Orbit | Customers | Launch outcome |
| V-164 | 12 February 2005; 21:03 | Ariane 5 ECA; 521 | Guiana; ELA-3 | XTAR-EUR; Maqsat-B2; Sloshsat-FLEVO | | GTO | | Success |
| V-166 | 11 August 2005; 08:20 | Ariane 5 GS; 523 | Guiana; ELA-3 | iPStar-1 | | GTO | | Success |
| V-166 | Maiden flight of Ariane 5GS | | | | | | | |
| V-168 | 13 October 2005; 22:32 | Ariane 5 GS; 524 | Guiana; ELA-3 | Syracuse 3A; Galaxy 15 | | GTO | | Success |
| V-167 | 16 November 2005; 23:46 | Ariane 5 ECA; 522 | Guiana; ELA-3 | Spaceway-2; Telkom-2 | | GTO | | Success |
| V-169 | 21 December 2005; 23:33 | Ariane 5 GS; 525 | Guiana; ELA-3 | Insat 4A; MSG-2 | | GTO | | Success |
=== 2006 ===
| Flight № | Date Time (UTC) | Rocket type Serial № | Launch site | Payload | Payload mass | Orbit | Customers | Launch outcome |
| V-170 | 11 March 2006; 22:33 | Ariane 5 ECA; 527 | Guiana; ELA-3 | Spainsat; Hot Bird 7A | | GTO | | Success |
| V-171 | 27 May 2006; 21:09 | Ariane 5 ECA; 529 | Guiana; ELA-3 | Satmex-6; Thaicom-5 | | GTO | | Success |
| V-172 | 11 August 2006; 22:15 | Ariane 5 ECA; 531 | Guiana; ELA-3 | JCSAT-10; Syracuse 3B | | GTO | | Success |
| V-173 | 13 October 2006; 20:56 | Ariane 5 ECA; 533 | Guiana; ELA-3 | DirecTV-9S; Optus D1; LDREX-2 | | GTO | | Success |
| V-174 | 8 December 2006; 22:08 | Ariane 5 ECA; 534 | Guiana; ELA-3 | WildBlue-1; AMC-18 | | GTO | | Success |
=== 2007 ===
| Flight № | Date Time (UTC) | Rocket type Serial № | Launch site | Payload | Payload mass | Orbit | Customers | Launch outcome |
| V-175 | 11 March 2007; 22:03 | Ariane 5 ECA; 535 | Guiana; ELA-3 | Skynet 5A; Insat 4B | | GTO | | Success |
| V-176 | 4 May 2007; 22:29 | Ariane 5 ECA; 536 | Guiana; ELA-3 | Astra 1L; Galaxy 17 | | GTO | | Success |
| V-177 | 14 August 2007; 23:44 | Ariane 5 ECA; 537 | Guiana; ELA-3 | Spaceway-3; BSat-3A | | GTO | | Success |
| V-178 | 5 October 2007; 22:02 | Ariane 5 GS; 526 | Guiana; ELA-3 | Intelsat 11; Optus D2 | | GTO | | Success |
| V-179 | 14 November 2007; 22:03 | Ariane 5 ECA; 538 | Guiana; ELA-3 | Skynet 5B; Star One C1 | | GTO | | Success |
| V-180 | 21 December 2007; 21:41 | Ariane 5 GS; 530 | Guiana; ELA-3 | Rascom-QAF1; Horizons-2 | | GTO | | Success |
=== 2008 ===
| Flight № | Date Time (UTC) | Rocket type Serial № | Launch site | Payload | Payload mass | Orbit | Customers | Launch outcome |
| V-181 | 9 March 2008; 04:03 | Ariane 5 ES; 528 | Guiana; ELA-3 | Jules Verne ATV | | LEO | | Success |
| V-181 | Maiden flight of Ariane 5ES | | | | | | | |
| V-182 | 18 April 2008; 22:17 | Ariane 5 ECA; 539 | Guiana; ELA-3 | Star One C2; Vinasat-1 | | GTO | | Success |
| V-183 | 12 June 2008; 22:05 | Ariane 5 ECA; 540 | Guiana; ELA-3 | Skynet 5C; Turksat 3A | | GTO | | Success |
| V-184 | 7 July 2008; 21:47 | Ariane 5 ECA; 541 | Guiana; ELA-3 | ProtoStar-1; Badr-6 | | GTO | | Success |
| V-185 | 14 August 2008; 20:44 | Ariane 5 ECA; 542 | Guiana; ELA-3 | Superbird-7; AMC-21 | | GTO | | Success |
| V-186 | 20 December 2008; 22:35 | Ariane 5 ECA; 543 | Guiana; ELA-3 | Hot Bird 9 Eutelsat W2M | | GTO | | Success |
=== 2009 ===
| Flight № | Date Time (UTC) | Rocket type Serial № | Launch site | Payload | Payload mass | Orbit | Customers | Launch outcome |
| V-187 | 12 February 2009; 22:09 | Ariane 5 ECA; 545 | Guiana; ELA-3 | Hot Bird 10; NSS-9; Spirale-A; Spirale-B | | GTO | | Success |
| V-188 | 14 May 2009; 13:12 | Ariane 5 ECA; 546 | Guiana; ELA-3 | Herschel Space Observatory; Planck | | Sun-Earth L_{2} point | | Success |
| V-189 | 1 July 2009; 19:52 | Ariane 5 ECA; 547 | Guiana; ELA-3 | TerreStar-1 | | GTO | | Success |
| V-190 | 21 August 2009; 22:09 | Ariane 5 ECA; 548 | Guiana; ELA-3 | JCSAT-12; Optus D3 | | GTO | | Success |
| V-191 | 1 October 2009; 21:59 | Ariane 5 ECA; 549 | Guiana; ELA-3 | Amazonas 2 COMSATBw-1 | | GTO | | Success |
| V-192 | 29 October 2009; 20:00 | Ariane 5 ECA; 550 | Guiana; ELA-3 | NSS-12; Thor-6 | | GTO | | Success |
| V-193 | 18 December 2009; 16:26 | Ariane 5 GS; 532 | Guiana; ELA-3 | Helios 2B | | SSO | | Success |
| V-193 | Final flight of Ariane 5GS | | | | | | | |
