= ELA-2 =

Launch pad at the Guiana Space Centre

Ensemble de Lancement Ariane 2 Ariane Launch Complex 2
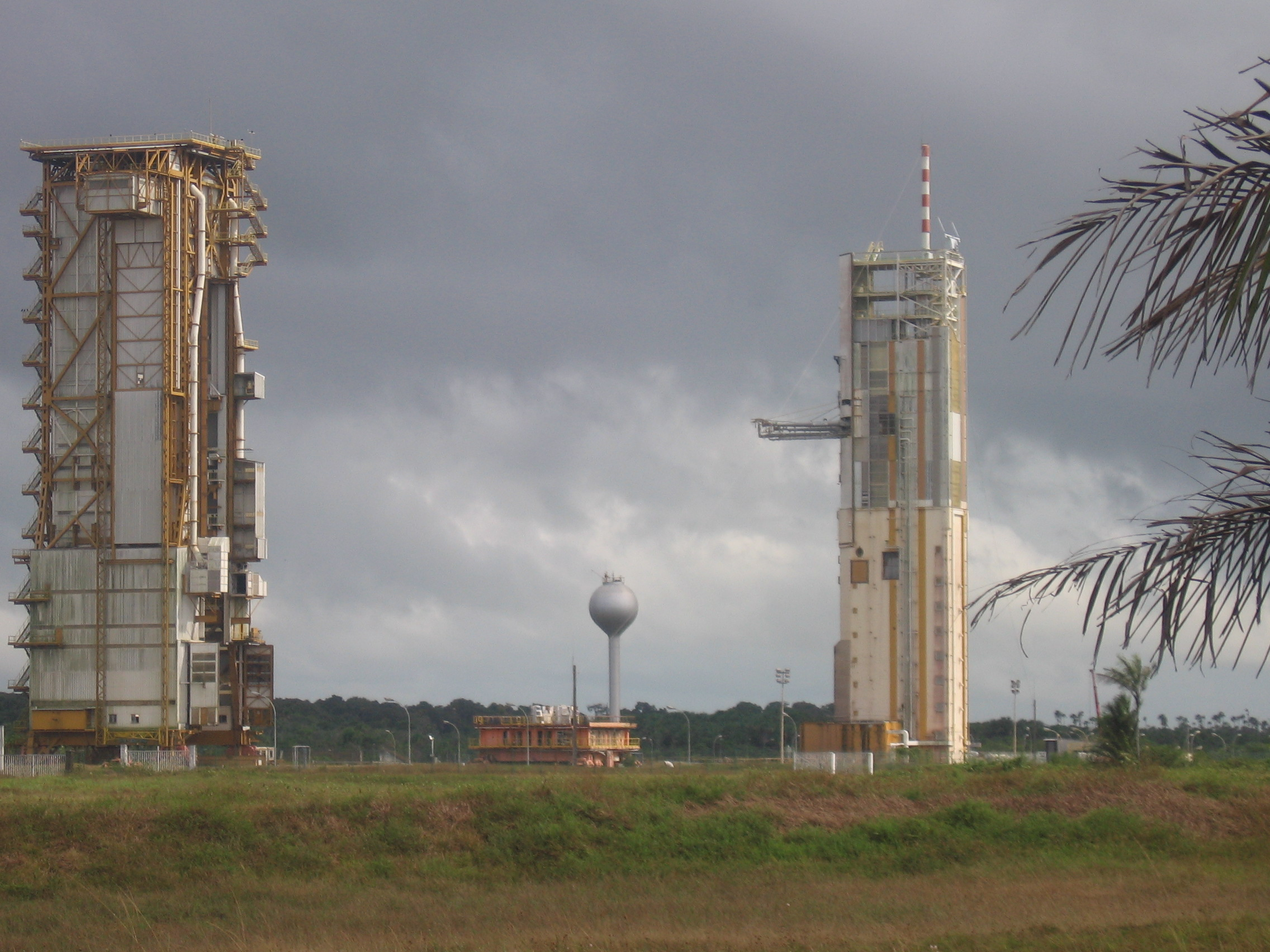
- ELA-2 in 2007, four years after Ariane 4's retirement.
- Interactive map of Ensemble de Lancement Ariane 2 Ariane Launch Complex 2
- Launch site: Guiana Space Centre
- Coordinates: 5.232°N 52.776°W
- Short name: ELA-2
- Operator: Arianespace/ESA
- Total launches: 119
- Launch pad: 1
- Orbital inclination range: 5°-100°
Launch history
- Status: Inactive
- First launch: 28 March 1986; Ariane 3 (GStar-2 and Brasilsat-A2)
- Last launch: 15 February 2003; Ariane 4 (Intelsat 907)
- Associated rockets: Ariane 4, Ariane 3, Ariane 2

ELA-2 (French: Ensemble de Lancement Ariane 2, lit. 'Ariane Launch Complex 2') is a launch pad at the Guiana Space Centre in French Guiana. Located approximately 750 metres south of ELA-1, it was used by Arianespace to support the launches of Ariane 2, Ariane 3, and Ariane 4 between 1986 and 2003.

Following the retirement of the Ariane 4 in favour of the Ariane 5, ELA-2 was deactivated. In September 2011 the pad's mobile service tower was demolished using explosives.

== Launch history ==
- Ariane 2
- Ariane 3
- Ariane 4
Launch Sites at the Guiana Space Centre
Active pads
Inactive tenanted pads
Inactive untenanted pads
1 ELFS
2 ELM
3 ELV
4 ELA-2
5 ELA-3
6 ELA-4
7 ELS

No.	Date	Time (UTC)	Launch vehicle	Configuration	Payload	Result	Remarks
1	28 March 1986	23:30	Ariane 3	Ariane 3	GStar-2 and Brasilsat-A2	Success	First launch from ELA-2 and first of two Ariane 3 flights from the complex.
2	21 November 1987	02:19	Ariane 2	Ariane 2	TVSAT-1	Success	Only Ariane 2 launch from ELA-2.
3	15 June 1988	11:19	Ariane 4	Ariane 44LP	Meteosat 3, Panamsat-1, and Oscar 13	Success	Maiden flight of the Ariane 4.
4	8 September 1988	23:00	Ariane 3	Ariane 3	GStar-5 and SBS-5	Success	Final of two Ariane 3 launches from ELA-2. Most recent non-Ariane 4 flight from the complex.
5	11 December 1988	00:33	Ariane 4	Ariane 44LP	Skynet 4B and Astra 1A	Success	
6	6 March 1989	23:29	Ariane 4	Ariane 44LP	JCSAT-1 and Meteosat 4	Success	
7	5 June 1989	22:37	Ariane 4	Ariane 44L	Superbird-A and DFS-1	Success	
8	8 August 1989	23:25	Ariane 4	Ariane 44LP	TVSAT-2 and Hipparcos	Success	Space telescope for Hipparcos, designed to conduct an astrometric survey of stars in the night sky.
9	27 October 1989	23:05	Ariane 4	Ariane 44L	Intelsat 602	Success	
10	22 January 1990	01:35	Ariane 4	Ariane 40	SPOT-2 and Oscar 14 through Oscar 19	Success	
11	22 February 1990	23:17	Ariane 4	Ariane 44L	Superbird-B and BS-2X	Failure	Handkerchief left in Viking engine waterline led to first stage failure and vehicle self-destruction.
12	24 July 1990	22:25	Ariane 4	Ariane 44L	TDF-2 and DFS-2	Success	
13	30 August 1990	22:46	Ariane 4	Ariane 44LP	Skynet 4C and Eutelsat 2F1	Success	
14	12 October 1990	22:58	Ariane 4	Ariane 44L	SBS-6 and Galaxy-6	Success	
15	20 November 1990	23:11	Ariane 4	Ariane 42P	Satcom C1 and GStar-4	Success	
16	15 January 1991	23:10	Ariane 4	Ariane 44L	Italsat-1 and Eutelsat 2F2	Success	
17	2 March 1991	23:36	Ariane 4	Ariane 44LP	Astra 1B and Meteosat 5	Success	
18	4 April 1991	23:33	Ariane 4	Ariane 44P	Anik E2	Success	
19	17 July 1991	01:46	Ariane 4	Ariane 40	ERS-1 and rideshares	Success	First of two European Remote-Sensing satellites, ESA's first Earth observation satellite program.
20	14 August 1991	23:15	Ariane 4	Ariane 44L	Intelsat 605	Success	
21	26 September 1991	23:43	Ariane 4	Ariane 44P	Anik E1	Success	
22	29 October 1991	23:08	Ariane 4	Ariane 44L	Intelsat 601	Success	
23	16 December 1991	22:19	Ariane 4	Ariane 44L	Telecom 2A and Inmarsat 2F3	Success	
24	26 February 1992	23:58	Ariane 4	Ariane 44L	Superbird-B1 and Arabsat-1C	Success	
25	15 April 1992	23:25	Ariane 4	Ariane 44L+	Telecom 2B and Inmarsat-2F4	Success	
26	9 July 1992	22:42	Ariane 4	Ariane 44L	Insat-2A and Eutelsat 2F4	Success	
27	10 August 1992	23:08	Ariane 4	Ariane 42P	TOPEX/Poseidon, Oscar 23, and S80/T	Success	First launch of the Jason satellite series for TOPEX/Poseidon, aiming to study oceanography. Collaboration between NASA and CNES.
28	10 September 1992	23:04	Ariane 4	Ariane 44LP+	Hispasat 1A and Satcom C3	Success	
29	28 October 1992	00:15	Ariane 4	Ariane 42P+	Galaxy-7	Success	
30	1 December 1992	22:48	Ariane 4	Ariane 42P+	Superbird A1	Success	
31	12 May 1993	00:56	Ariane 4	Ariane 42L	Astra 1C and Arsene	Success	
32	25 June 1993	00:18	Ariane 4	Ariane 42P+	Galaxy-4	Success	
33	22 July 1993	22:58	Ariane 4	Ariane 44L	Hispasat 1B and Insat-2B	Success	
34	26 September 1993	01:45	Ariane 4	Ariane 40	SPOT-3 and rideshares	Success	
35	22 October 1993	06:46	Ariane 4	Ariane 44LP	Intelsat 701	Success	
36	20 November 1993	01:17	Ariane 4	Ariane 44LP	Solidaridad 1 and Meteosat 6	Success	
37	18 December 1993	01:27	Ariane 4	Ariane 44L	DBS-1 and Thaicom-1	Success	
38	24 January 1994	21:37	Ariane 4	Ariane 44LP	Eutelsat 2F5 and Turksat 1A	Failure	Third stage turbopump malfunction led to failure to achieve orbit.
39	17 June 1994	07:07	Ariane 4	Ariane 44LP	Intelsat 702 and STRV 1A & 1B	Success	
40	8 July 1994	23:05	Ariane 4	Ariane 44L	PanAmSat-2 and Yuri-3N	Success	
41	10 August 1994	23:05	Ariane 4	Ariane 44LP	Brasilsat B1 and Turksat 1B	Success	
42	9 September 1994	00:29	Ariane 4	Ariane 42L+	Telstar 402	Success	
43	8 October 1994	01:07	Ariane 4	Ariane 44L	Solidaridad-2 andThaicom-2	Success	
44	1 November 1994	00:37	Ariane 4	Ariane 42P	Astra 1D	Success	
45	1 December 1994	22:57	Ariane 4	Ariane 42P	PanAmSat-3	Failure	Third stage gas generator malfunction led to failure to achieve orbit.
46	28 March 1995	11:19	Ariane 4	Ariane 44LP+	Brasilsat B2 and Hot Bird 1	Success	
47	21 April 1995	01:44	Ariane 4	Ariane 40+	ERS-2	Success	Second of two European Remote-Sensing satellites, ESA's first Earth observation satellite program.
48	17 May 1995	06:34	Ariane 4	Ariane 44LP	Intelsat 706	Success	
49	10 June 1995	00:24	Ariane 4	Ariane 42P	DBS-3	Success	
50	7 July 1995	16:23	Ariane 4	Ariane 40	Hélios 1A, Cerise, andLBSAT/UPM-Sat 1	Success	
51	3 August 1995	22:58	Ariane 4	Ariane 42L-3	PanAmSat-4	Success	
52	29 August 1995	06:41	Ariane 4	Ariane 44P	N-Star A	Success	
53	24 September 1995	00:06	Ariane 4	Ariane 42L-3	Telstar 402R	Success	
54	19 October 1995	00:28	Ariane 4	Ariane 42L-3	Astra 1E	Success	
55	17 November 1995	01:20	Ariane 4	Ariane 44P	Infrared Space Observatory	Success	Space telescope designed to conduct infrared astronomy. Collaboration between ESA, NASA, and ISAS.
56	6 December 1995	23:23	Ariane 4	Ariane 44L	Telecom 2C and Insat 2C	Success	
57	12 January 1996	23:10	Ariane 4	Ariane 44L	PanAmSat-3R Measat-1	Success	
58	5 February 1996	07:19	Ariane 4	Ariane 44P	N-STAR b	Success	
59	14 March 1996	07:11	Ariane 4	Ariane 44LP	Intelsat 707	Success	
60	20 April 1996	22:36	Ariane 4	Ariane 42P	MSAT-1	Success	
61	16 May 1996	01:56	Ariane 4	Ariane 44L	Palapa C2 and AMOS-1	Success	
62	15 June 1996	06:55	Ariane 4	Ariane 44P	Intelsat 709	Success	
63	9 July 1996	22:24	Ariane 4	Ariane 44L	Arabsat-2A and Türksat 1C	Success	
64	8 August 1996	22:49	Ariane 4	Ariane 44L	Italsat F2 and Telecom 2D	Success	
65	11 September 1996	00:00	Ariane 4	Ariane 42P	Echostar-2	Success	
66	13 November 1996	22:40	Ariane 4	Ariane 44L	Arabsat-2B and Measat-2	Success	
67	30 January 1997	22:04	Ariane 4	Ariane 44L	GE-2 and Nahuel 1A	Success	
68	1 March 1997	01:07	Ariane 4	Ariane 44P	Intelsat 801	Success	
69	16 April 1997	23:08	Ariane 4	Ariane 44LP	Thaicom 3 and BSAT 1a	Success	
70	3 June 1997	23:20	Ariane 4	Ariane 44L	Inmarsat 3F4 and Insat 2D	Success	
71	25 June 1997	23:44	Ariane 4	Ariane 44P	Intelsat 802	Success	
72	8 August 1997	06:46	Ariane 4	Ariane 44P	PanAmSat-6	Success	
73	2 September 1997	22:21	Ariane 4	Ariane 44LP	Hot Bird 3 and Meteosat 7	Success	
74	23 September 1997	23:58	Ariane 4	Ariane 42L-3	Intelsat 803	Success	
75	12 November 1997	21:48	Ariane 4	Ariane 44L	Sirius-2 and Cakrawarta-1	Success	
76	2 December 1997	22:52	Ariane 4	Ariane 44P	JCSAT-5 and Equator-S	Success	
77	22 December 1997	00:16	Ariane 4	Ariane 42L-3	Intelsat 804	Success	
78	4 February 1998	23:29	Ariane 4	Ariane 44LP	Brasilsat B3 and Inmarsat 3F5	Success	
79	27 February 1998	22:38	Ariane 4	Ariane 42P	Hot Bird 4	Success	
80	24 March 1998	01:46	Ariane 4	Ariane 40	SPOT-4	Success	
81	28 April 1998	22:53	Ariane 4	Ariane 44P	Nilesat-1 and BSAT-1B	Success	
82	25 August 1998	23:07	Ariane 4	Ariane 44P	ST-1	Success	
83	16 September 1998	06:31	Ariane 4	Ariane 44LP	PanAmSat 7	Success	
84	5 October 1998	22:51	Ariane 4	Ariane 44L	Eutelsat W2 and Sirius-3	Success	
85	28 October 1998	22:15	Ariane 4	Ariane 44L	Afristar and GE-5	Success	
86	6 December 1998	00:43	Ariane 4	Ariane 42L-3	Satmex 5	Success	
87	22 December 1998	01:08	Ariane 4	Ariane 42L-3	PanAmSat-6B	Success	
88	26 February 1999	22:44	Ariane 4	Ariane 44L	Arabsat-3A and Skynet 4E	Success	
89	2 April 1999	22:03	Ariane 4	Ariane 42P	Insat-2E	Success	
90	12 August 1999	22:52	Ariane 4	Ariane 42P	Telkom-1	Success	
91	4 September 1999	22:34	Ariane 4	Ariane 42P	Koreasat-3	Success	
92	25 September 1999	06:29	Ariane 4	Ariane 44LP	Telstar 7	Success	
93	19 October 1999	06:22	Ariane 4	Ariane 44LP	Orion 2	Success	
94	13 November 1999	22:54	Ariane 4	Ariane 44LP	GE-4	Success	
95	3 December 1999	16:22	Ariane 4	Ariane 40	Helios 1B and Clémentine	Success	
96	22 December 1999	00:50	Ariane 4	Ariane 44L-3	Galaxy-11	Success	
97	25 January 2000	01:04	Ariane 4	Ariane 42L-3	Galaxy 10R	Success	
98	18 February 2000	01:04	Ariane 4	Ariane 44LP	Superbird 4	Success	
99	19 April 2000	00:29	Ariane 4	Ariane 42L-3	Galaxy 4R	Success	
100	17 August 2000	23:16	Ariane 4	Ariane 44LP-3	Brasilsat B4 and Nilesat 102	Success	
101	6 September 2000	22:33	Ariane 4	Ariane 44P	Eutelsat W1	Success	
102	6 October 2000	23:00	Ariane 4	Ariane 42L-3	N-SAT 110	Success	
103	29 October 2000	05:59	Ariane 4	Ariane 44LP-3	EuropeStar F1	Success	
104	21 November 2000	23:56	Ariane 4	Ariane 44L-3	Anik F1	Success	
105	10 January 2001	22:09	Ariane 4	Ariane 44P-3	Turksat 2A	Success	
106	7 February 2001	23:05	Ariane 4	Ariane 44L-3	Sicral-1 and Skynet 4F	Success	
107	9 June 2001	06:45	Ariane 4	Ariane 44L-3	Intelsat 901	Success	
108	30 August 2001	05:46	Ariane 4	Ariane 44L-3	Intelsat 902	Success	
109	25 September 2001	23:21	Ariane 4	Ariane 44P	Atlantic Bird 2	Success	
110	27 November 2001	05:59	Ariane 4	Ariane 44LP-3	DirecTV-4S	Success	
111	23 January 2002	23:46	Ariane 4	Ariane 42L-3	Insat 3C	Success	
112	23 February 2002	06:59	Ariane 4	Ariane 44L	Intelsat 904	Success	
113	29 March 2002	01:29	Ariane 4	Ariane 44L	Astra 3A and JCSAT-8	Success	
114	16 April 2002	23:02	Ariane 4	Ariane 44L-3	NSS-7	Success	
115	4 May 2002	01:31	Ariane 4	Ariane 42P	SPOT-5 and IDEFIX	Success	
116	5 June 2002	06:44	Ariane 4	Ariane 44L	Intelsat 905	Success	
117	6 September 2002	06:44	Ariane 4	Ariane 44L	Intelsat 906	Success	
118	17 December 2002	23:04	Ariane 4	Ariane 44L	NSS-6	Success	
119	15 February 2003	07:00	Ariane 4	Ariane 44L	Intelsat 907	Success	Final launch of Ariane 4. Most recent flight from ELA-2.

== See also ==
- ELA-1
- ELA-3
- ELA-4
- ELS
