= List of Ariane launches (1979–1989) =

This is a list of launches performed by Ariane carrier rockets between 1979, when the type first flew, and 1989. This period includes all flights of the Ariane 1, Ariane 2 and Ariane 3, as well as early Ariane 4 launches.

== Launch statistics ==
=== Rocket configurations ===
- Ariane 1
- Ariane 2
- Ariane 3
- Ariane 4 44L
- Ariane 4 44LP

=== Launch outcomes ===
- Failure
- Success

== Launch history ==
=== 1979 ===
Date (UTC)	Variant	Configuration	Serial N^{o}	Payload	Orbit	Outcome	Remarks
24 December 1979, 17:14	Ariane 1		L-01	CAT-1	GTO	Success	Development flight
=== 1980 ===
23 May 1980, 14:29	Ariane 1		L-02	Firewheel; Feurrad; AMSAT-3A; CAT-2	GTO	Failure	Failed to reach orbit due to combustion instability during first stage burn.
=== 1981 ===
19 June 1981, 12:33	Ariane 1		L-03	Meteosat 2 Apple; CAT-3	GTO	Success	
20 December 1981, 01:29	Ariane 1		L-04	MARECS-1; CAT-4	GTO	Success	
=== 1982 ===
9 September 1982, 02:12	Ariane 1		L-05	MARECS-B; Sirio-2	GTO	Failure	Third stage turbopump malfunction
=== 1983 ===
16 June 1983, 11:59	Ariane 1		L-06	Eutelsat-1; Oscar-10	GTO	Success	
19 October 1983, 00:45	Ariane 1		L-07	Intelsat 507	GTO	Success	
=== 1984 ===
5 March 1984, 00:50	Ariane 1		L-08	Intelsat 508	GTO	Success	
23 May 1984, 01:33	Ariane 1		V-9/L-09	Spacenet F1	GTO	Success	First flight managed by Arianespace
4 August 1984, 13:32	Ariane 3		V-10/L-12	Eutelsat-2; Telecom 1A	GTO	Success	Maiden flight of Ariane 3
10 November 1984, 01:14	Ariane 3		V-11/L-13	Spacenet F2; MARECS-B2	GTO	Success	
=== 1985 ===
8 February 1985, 23:22	Ariane 3		V-12/L-14	Arabsat-1A; Brasilsat-A1	GTO	Success	
8 May 1985, 01:15	Ariane 3		V-13/L-15	GStar-1; Telecom 1B	GTO	Success	
2 July 1985, 11:23	Ariane 1		V-14/L-10	Giotto	HCO	Success	
12 September 1985, 23:26	Ariane 3		V-15/L-16	Eutelsat-3; Spacenet F3	GTO (Planned)	Failure	Third stage failed to ignite
=== 1986 ===
22 February 1986, 01:44	Ariane 1		V-16/L-11	SPOT-1; Viking	SSO	Success	Final flight of Ariane 1
28 March 1986, 23:30	Ariane 3		V-17/L-17	GStar-2; Brasilsat-A2	GTO	Success	
31 May 1986, 00:53	Ariane 2		V-18/L-18	Intelsat 5A14	GTO	Failure	Maiden flight of Ariane 2 Third stage failed to ignite
=== 1987 ===
16 September 1987, 00:45	Ariane 3		V-19/L-19	Aussat-A3; Eutelsat 1F4	GTO	Success	
21 November 1987, 02:19	Ariane 2		V-20/L-20	TVSAT-1	GTO	Success	
=== 1988 ===
11 March 1988, 23:28	Ariane 3		V-21/L-21	Spacenet F3R; Telecom 1C	GTO	Success	
17 May 1988, 23:58	Ariane 2		V-23/L-22	Intelsat 3AF13	GTO	Success	
15 June 1988, 11:19	Ariane 4	44LP	V-22/401	Meteosat 3 Panamsat-1; Oscar 13	GTO	Success	Maiden flight of Ariane 4
21 July 1988, 23:12	Ariane 3		V-24/L-23	Insat 1C; Eutelsat 1F5	GTO	Success	
8 September 1988, 23:00	Ariane 3		V-25/L-24	GStar-5; SBS-5	GTO	Success	
28 October 1988, 02:17	Ariane 2		V-26/L-25	TDF-1	GTO	Success	
11 December 1988, 00:33	Ariane 4	44LP	V-27/402	Skynet 4B; Astra 1A	GTO	Success	
=== 1989 ===
27 January 1989, 01:21	Ariane 2		V-28/L-26	Intelsat 5AF15	GTO	Success	
6 March 1989, 23:29	Ariane 4	44LP	V-29/403	JCSAT-1; Meteosat 4	GTO	Success	
2 April 1989, 02:28	Ariane 2		V-30/L-27	TELE-X	GTO	Success	Final flight of Ariane 2
5 June 1989, 22:37	Ariane 4	44L	V-31/404	Superbird-A; DFS-1	GTO	Success	
12 July 1989, 00:14	Ariane 3		V-32/L-28	Olympus-1	GTO	Success	Final flight of Ariane 3
8 August 1989, 23:25:53	Ariane 4	44LP	V-33/405	TVSAT-2; Hipparcos	GTO	Success	
27 October 1989, 23:05	Ariane 4	44L	V-34/406	Intelsat 602	GTO	Success	
