= Dove-OSCAR 17 =

Brazilian educational and amateur radio satellite

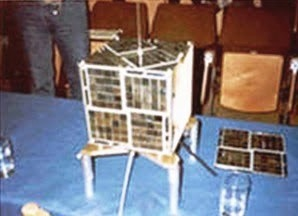
- Dove-OSCAR 17 satellite (a.k.a. Microsat 2)
- Names: OSCAR 17; Microsat 2 DO-17; BRAMSAT
- Mission type: Educational, Amateur radio
- Operator: BRAMSAT / AMSAT
- COSPAR ID: 1990-005E
- SATCAT no.: 20440
- Mission duration: 36 years, 4 months and 12 days (in solar orbit)

Spacecraft properties
- Bus: AMSAT
- Manufacturer: AMSAT-BRAZIL
- Launch mass: 12.92 kg (28.5 lb)
- Dimensions: 21.3 × 23.0 × 23.0 cm
- Power: Solar panels and batteries

Start of mission
- Launch date: 2 January 1990, 01:44:35 UTC
- Rocket: Ariane 40 H10 V-35
- Launch site: Kourou, ELA-2
- Contractor: Arianespace

End of mission
- Last contact: March 1998

Orbital parameters
- Reference system: Sun-synchronous orbit
- Regime: Low Earth orbit
- Perigee altitude: 791 km (492 mi)
- Apogee altitude: 821 km (510 mi)
- Inclination: 98.70°
- Period: 100.80 minutes

Dove-OSCAR 17 (a.k.a. DO-17 or Microsat 2) is a Brazilian educational and amateur radio satellite (BRAMSAT) (AMSAT-BRAZIL) launched on 22 January 1990.

== Project ==
Dove-OSCAR 17 is one of the results of the so-called Microsat project by AMSAT, manufactured in the 1980s by the civil and electric engineer Junior Torres de Castro (amateur radio operator with callsign PY2BJO), who had been developing his ideas since 1957. He has built, with his own resources, the first artificial satellite for educational and humanitarian purposes: the "Dove".

The device, assembled in a garage in Botucatu, São Paulo, was meant to provide synthesised peace messages for educational institutions at a time when the Cold War was still determining international relations around the world. It has a Digital Orbiting Voice Encoder (DOVE), designed to emit the synthesised voice messages, and also telemetry data transmission (FM Packet AFSK 1200 AX.25 at 145.825 MHz). It is box shaped with dimensions of 21.3 × 23.0 × 23.0 cm, with solar panels on the faces of the cube and weights 12.92 kg. The configuration and assembly was at that time designated as "Microsat".

== Mission ==
Dove-OSCAR 17 was launched on 22 January 1990 by an Ariane 4 rocket from Centre Spatial Guyanais (CSG). The payload also included the SPOT-2 and other five OSCAR satellites. According to AMSAT, "due to hardware failures that have occurred since launch, the primary mission of providing voice messages of world peace from DOVE has not been fully realized"

Last stable contact with the satellite officially occurred in March 1998 when it had a battery failure. However, because of the still functional solar panels, when the device is properly aligned to the Sun, it transmits its telemetry data.

== See also ==
- OSCAR Satellites Launches
- List of Ariane launches (1990–99)
