= Galaxy 11 =

American geostationary communications satellite

- Mission type: Communication
- Operator: PanAmSat; Intelsat
- COSPAR ID: 1999-071A
- SATCAT no.: 26038
- Mission duration: 15 years (planned); 26 years, 10 months, 21 days (in progress)

Spacecraft properties
- Bus: HS-702
- Manufacturer: Hughes S&C
- Launch mass: 4,477 kilograms (9,870 lb)

Start of mission
- Launch date: 22 December 1999, 00:50 UTC
- Rocket: Ariane 44L
- Launch site: Kourou ELA-2
- Contractor: Arianespace

Orbital parameters
- Reference system: Geocentric
- Regime: Geostationary
- Longitude: 78.5° West(1999-2000); 99° West (2000); 91° West (2000-2008); 93° West (2008); 32.8° East (2008—)
- Perigee altitude: 33,612 kilometres (20,886 mi)
- Apogee altitude: 38,050 kilometres (23,640 mi)
- Inclination: 0.12 degrees
- Period: 1438.36 minutes
- Epoch: 21 January 2000

Transponders
- Band: 24 G/H band 40 J band

Galaxy 11 is an American geostationary communications satellite which is operated by Intelsat. It is located in geostationary orbit at a longitude of 32.8 degrees east, where it serves as a backup to the Intelsat 802 spacecraft. It was originally operated at 99° West and later spent most of its operational life at 91° West, from where it was used to provide communications services to Brazil and North America.

== History ==
Galaxy 11 was built for PanAmSat by Hughes Space and Communications, and is based on the HS-702 satellite bus. It was the first HS-702 to be launched, and the first satellite to be equipped with an XIPS propulsion system. It carries 24 G/H band and 40 J band (IEEE C and K_{u} bands respectively) transponders, and at launch it had a mass of 4,477 kilograms (9,870 lb), with an expected operational lifespan of around 15 years.

As the first HS-702 to fly, the Galaxy 11 was one of the six which were launched before a design flaw in the type's solar arrays was discovered. Solar concentrators, used to increase the amount of sunlight falling on the arrays, were fogging up due to vapours emitted by the satellite. This reduces the output of the solar arrays, and is expected to result in a reduced operational lifespan. Following the discovery of the fault, US$130 million insurance was claimed on the satellite. The satellite was transferred to Intelsat when it merged with PanAmSat in 2006.

The launch of Galaxy 11 was conducted by Arianespace, using an Ariane 44L carrier rocket flying from ELA-2 at the Guiana Space Centre. The launch occurred at 00:50 UTC on 22 December 1999. It successfully placed Galaxy 11 into a geosynchronous transfer orbit, from which it raised itself to a geostationary orbit by means of an onboard R-4D apogee motor. Its insertion into geosynchronous orbit occurred at 16:30 on 2 January 2000. The satellite was originally scheduled to be launched by Sea Launch, on the maiden flight of the Zenit-3SL, however the contract was transferred to Arianespace, and Sea Launch replaced Galaxy 11 with a DemoSat for their maiden flight.

It currently operates at 44.9° East.

On 10 September 2022, the International Scientific Optical Network coordinated by the Keldysh Institute of Applied Mathematics reported that Galaxy 11 had been partially destroyed in geostationary orbit, which is potentially dangerous for other satellites.

Despite the report from the Keldysh Institute of Applied Mathematics, the Galaxy 11 satellite continues to operate nominally with no disruption to communications service.

== See also ==
- 1999 in spaceflight
