= Intelsat 906 =

American communications satellite

- Mission type: Communications
- Operator: Intelsat
- COSPAR ID: 2002-041A
- SATCAT no.: 27513
- Mission duration: 13 years

Spacecraft properties
- Spacecraft type: SSL-1300HL
- Manufacturer: Space Systems/Loral
- Launch mass: 4,723.0 kg (10,412.4 lb)
- Dry mass: 1,955.0 kg (4,310.0 lb)

Start of mission
- Launch date: September 6, 2002, 06:44 UTC
- Rocket: Ariane 44L H10-3
- Launch site: Kourou ELA-2
- Contractor: Arianespace

Orbital parameters
- Reference system: Geocentric
- Regime: Geostationary
- Longitude: 64° east
- Semi-major axis: 42,164.0 kilometres (26,199.5 mi)
- Perigee altitude: 35,783.7 kilometres (22,235.0 mi)
- Apogee altitude: 35,804.2 kilometres (22,247.7 mi)
- Inclination: 0.0°
- Period: 1,436.1 minutes
- Epoch: May 23, 2017

Transponders
- Band: 72 C band and 22 K_{u} band
- Bandwidth: 36 MHz
- Coverage area: Africa, Australia, Europe, India, Russia
- EIRP: 36-44 dBW (C band) 53 dBW (K_{u} band)

Intelsat 906 (or IS-906) is a communications satellite operated by Intelsat.

== Launch ==
Intelsat 906 was launched by an Ariane 4 rocket from Guiana Space Centre, French Guiana, at 06:44 UTC on September 6, 2002.

== Capacity and coverage ==
It will broadcasting, business services, direct-to-home TV broadcasting, telecommunications and VSAT networks to Europe, Asia, and Australia through its 72 C band 22 Ku band transponders after parking over 64 degrees east longitude. It displaces Intelsat 804 which will then be moved to 176 degrees east to handle the increased cross-Atlantic demand.

== See also ==
- 2002 in spaceflight
