= Hélios 1B =

French military reconnaissance satellite (1999–2004)

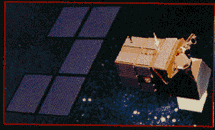
Hélios 1

Hélios 1A and Hélios 1B were French military photo-reconnaissance satellites in which Italy and Spain also participated. Hélios 1A was launched from the Guiana Space Centre, French Guiana on 7 July 1995 by an Ariane 4, riding alongside Cerise, another French military satellite. Hélios 1B was launched on 3 December 1999 by another Ariane 4, also co-manifested with another military satellite: Clementine.

== Mission ==
The two Helios 1 satellites constitute the first generation of the program, the development began in 1985. They operated in a Sun-synchronous orbit at an altitude of 678 km. Their instruments offered a resolution of the order of one or two meters on the ground.

Derived from SPOT 4, they retained the platform but were equipped with an attitude and orbit control system (SCAO). This system realized the kinematics of the orientation of the satellite via flywheels. This system allowed fine pointing of the shooting lens for several seconds, thus increasing the quality of the images. The SPOT 4 mirror was also replaced, making it possible to target targets outside the satellite's trajectory. The control of the orientation kinematics is ensured by the SCAO via the stellar sensors. Three in number, these are the three cones that we see protruding from the platform. Only two are active at the same time. The flywheels are then controlled by the SCAO which tries to follow a selection of the brightest stars in order to ensure the desired kinematics. This selection of stars is programmed by the ground mission software.

Helios 1A and 1B are distinguished from SPOT 4 by the absence of polychromy of the images (they are in black and white) optimizing the image storage capacity.

Helios 1A was launched on July 7, 1995 by an Ariane 4 launcher. Due to power supply failures, it had to be left to disintegrate in 2005. Helios 1B was launched on December 3, 1999. Helios 1B was voluntarily de-orbited in October 2004 before definitively losing control. The satellite has been the victim of a loss of charge of an accumulator since May of the same year which in turn leads to the premature wear of the others. Helios 1A ceased to be operational in February 2012 and was also purposely de-orbited.

It was replaced by Hélios 2A, launched in December 2004 on an Ariane 5 rocket. Helios 2A was decommissioned in 2022, having been replaced by CSO Composante Spatiale Optique.

== Bibliography ==
- (in French and English) Guy Lebègue, (trad. Robert J. Amral), « Helios: The Orbiting Spyglass », in Revue aerospatiale, n°118, May 1995.
