= Koreasat =

South Korean communications satellites

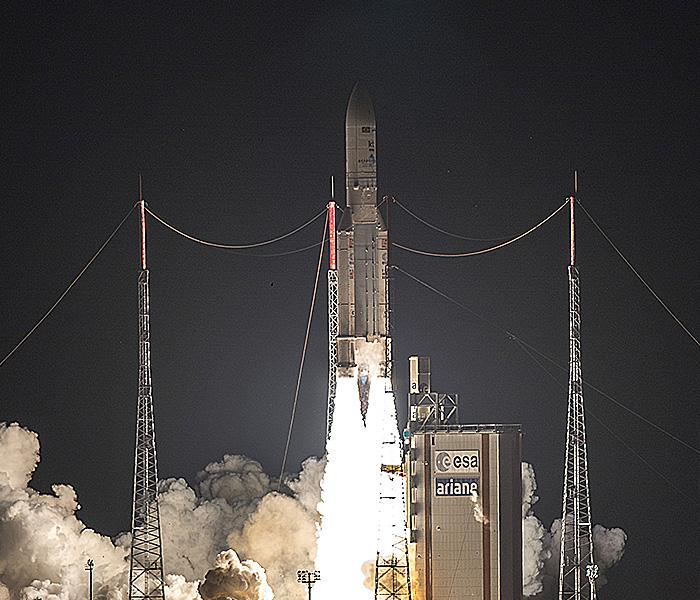
Koreasat 7 launched in 2017

Koreasat (Korean: 무궁화위성; Hanja: 無窮花衛星) is a series of South Korean communications satellites operated by KT SAT, a subsidiary of KT Corporation.

== Satellites ==
Designation	COSPAR ID	Launch Date	Launch Vehicle	Launch site	Orbit	Longitude	Status	Ref.
Koreasat 1	1995-041A	1995-08-05	Delta II 7925	Cape Canaveral	GSO	116ºE	Retired; 2023-03-13	
Koreasat 2	1996-003A	1996-01-14	Delta II	Cape Canaveral	GSO	116ºE	Active	
Koreasat 3 (ABS-7)	1999-046A	1999-09-04	Ariane 42P	Guiana	GSO	116.1ºE	Retired; 2022-02-16	
Koreasat 5 (ANASIS-I)	2006-034A	2006-08-22	Zenit 3SL	Odyssey	GSO	113ºE	Active	
Koreasat 5A	2017-067A	2017-10-30	Falcon 9 Block 4	Cape Canaveral	GSO	113ºE	Active	
Koreasat 6	2010-070B	2010-12-29	Ariane 5	Guiana	GSO	116ºE	Active	
Koreasat 6A	2024-206A	2024-11-11	Falcon 9 Block 5	Cape Canaveral	GSO	116ºE	Under commissioning	
Koreasat 7	2017-023A	2017-05-04	Ariane 5	Guiana	GSO	116ºE	Active	
Koreasat 8 (ABS-2)	2014-006A	2014-02-06	Ariane 5	Guiana	GSO	75ºE	Active	
Koreasat 116 (ANASIS-II)	2020-048A	2020-07-20	Falcon 9 Block 5	Cape Canaveral	GSO	116ºE	Active	
