= Intelsat 709 =

Geostationary communications satellite

- Names: IS-709; Intelsat 7-F9
- Mission type: Communications
- Operator: Intelsat
- COSPAR ID: 1996-035A
- SATCAT no.: 23915
- Mission duration: 15 years (planned); 17 years (achieved)

Spacecraft properties
- Bus: SSL-1300
- Manufacturer: SSL
- Launch mass: 4,180 kg (9,220 lb)
- Dry mass: 1,450 kg (3,200 lb)
- Power: 3600 watts

Start of mission
- Launch date: 15 June 1996, 06:55:09 UTC
- Rocket: Ariane 44P (V-87)
- Launch site: Kourou, ELA-2
- Contractor: Arianespace

End of mission
- Disposal: Decommissioned
- Deactivated: February 2013

Orbital parameters
- Reference system: Geocentric orbit
- Regime: Geostationary orbit
- Longitude: 47.5° East

Transponders
- Band: 26 C-band; 10 Ku-band
- Coverage area: Atlantic Ocean region

Intelsat 709 (also known as IS-709 and Intelsat 7-F9) is a geostationary Communications satellite that was built by Space Systems/Loral (SSL). It is located in the orbital position of 47.5° west longitude. The satellite is owned by Intelsat. The satellite was based on the LS-1300 platform and its estimated useful life was 15 years.

The Intelsat 709 is equipped with 26 transponders in C-band and 10 in Ku-band to provide broadcasting, business-to-home services, telecommunications, VSAT networks.

== See also ==
- 1996 in spaceflight
