= ST-1 =

Communications satellite of Singapore Telecom and Chunghwa Telecom

- Mission type: Communications
- Operator: Singapore Telecom; Chunghwa Telecom
- COSPAR ID: 1998-049A
- SATCAT no.: 25460
- Mission duration: 13 years

Spacecraft properties
- Bus: Eurostar-2000+
- Manufacturer: Matra Marconi
- Launch mass: 3,200 kilograms (7,100 lb)

Start of mission
- Launch date: 25 August 1998, 23:07 UTC
- Rocket: Ariane 44P V109
- Launch site: Kourou ELA-2
- Contractor: Arianespace

Orbital parameters
- Reference system: Geocentric
- Regime: Geostationary
- Longitude: 88° east
- Perigee altitude: 35,771 kilometres (22,227 mi)
- Apogee altitude: 35,813 kilometres (22,253 mi)
- Inclination: 1.83 degrees
- Period: 23.93 hours
- Epoch: 29 October 2013, 18:16:49 UTC

ST-1 is a communications satellite owned by Singapore Telecom and Taiwan's Chunghwa Telecom Company, Ltd. It was placed launched on 25 August 1998, by an Ariane 4 rocket. The two companies jointly operate the spacecraft from control centres located in Seletar, Singapore and Taipei, Taiwan, respectively.

ST-1 carries 16 high-power K_{u} band transponders and 14 medium-power C-band transponders. Weighing over 3,000 kg (6,600 lb.) at launch, ST-1 generates more than 6,500 watts of electrical power. The satellite's broad C-band coverage beam extends from the Middle East to Japan, including all of Southeast Asia.

ST-1 also features two K_{u}-band spot beams: a "K1" beam that stretches from Taiwan to Singapore and from Indonesia to Malaysia and a "K2" beam centred over the Indian subcontinent. The ST-1 satellite currently delivers telephony, digital DTH broadcasting, VSAT and other business services throughout the region.

Singapore Telecom and Taiwan's Chunghwa Telecom Company are currently operating the replacement satellite ST-2 after ST-1 has reached its mission duration in 2011.
