= Intelsat 702 =

Geostationary communication satellite

- Mission type: Communications
- Operator: Intelsat
- COSPAR ID: 1994-034A
- SATCAT no.: 23124
- Mission duration: 15 years design life

Spacecraft properties
- Bus: FS-1300
- Manufacturer: Space Systems/Loral
- Launch mass: 3,695 kilograms (8,146 lb)

Start of mission
- Launch date: 17 June 1994, 07:07:19 UTC
- Rocket: Ariane 44LP H10+
- Launch site: Kourou ELA-2

Orbital parameters
- Reference system: Geocentric
- Regime: Geostationary
- Longitude: 32.9° E
- Semi-major axis: 42,542 kilometres (26,434 mi)
- Perigee altitude: 36,155.5 kilometres (22,466.0 mi)
- Apogee altitude: 36,188.6 kilometres (22,486.6 mi)
- Inclination: 4.4 degrees
- Period: 1,455.5 minutes
- Epoch: April 28, 2017

Transponders
- Band: 26 C band 10 K_{u} band

Intelsat 702 (also known as IS-702 and Intelsat 7-F2) is a geostationary communication satellite that was built by Space Systems/Loral (SSL). It is located in the orbital position of 32.9 degrees east longitude and it is currently in an inclined orbit. The satellite is owned by Intelsat. The satellite was based on the Loral FS-1300 platform and its estimated useful life was 15 years.

The satellite was successfully launched into space on June 17, 1994, at 07:07:19 UTC, using an Ariane 44L vehicle from the Guiana Space Center in French Guiana, together with the satellites STRV 1A and STRV 1B. It had a launch mass of 3,695 kg.

The Intelsat 702 is equipped with 26 transponders in C band and 10 in Ku band to provide broadcasting, business-to-home services, telecommunications, VSATnetworks.

In September 2016, the satellite reached end-of-life and was retired to a graveyard orbit. Intelsat 17, another Space Systems Loral satellite, assumed its communications role after delivery to orbit in late 2010.
