= INSAT-2E =

Indian geostationary satellite

- Mission type: Communication; Weather
- Operator: INSAT
- COSPAR ID: 1999-016A
- SATCAT no.: 25666
- Mission duration: 12 years (planned)

Spacecraft properties
- Bus: INSAT-2/3
- Manufacturer: ISRO
- Launch mass: 2,550 kilograms (5,620 lb)
- Power: 2,050 watts

Start of mission
- Launch date: 2 April 1999, 22:03 UTC
- Rocket: Ariane 42P
- Launch site: Kourou ELA-2
- Contractor: Arianespace

Orbital parameters
- Reference system: Geocentric
- Regime: Geosynchronous
- Longitude: 83° East
- Perigee altitude: 35,766 kilometres (22,224 mi)
- Apogee altitude: 35,806 kilometres (22,249 mi)
- Inclination: 0.05 degrees
- Period: 1436.06 minutes
- Epoch: 2 May 1999

Transponders
- Band: 17 G/H band

INSAT-2E is an Indian geostationary communications and weather satellite which is operated by the Indian National Satellite System. It is positioned in geostationary orbit at a longitude of 83° East, from where it is used to provide communications services to Asia and Australia. It also carries two meteorological instruments; the Very High Resolution Radiometer, and a CCD camera capable of returning images with a resolution of one kilometre.

The communications payload aboard INSAT-2E consists of seventeen G/H band (IEEE C band) transponders. At launch the satellite had a mass of 2,550 kilograms (5,620 lb), with an expected operational lifespan of 12 years. Some of its transponders are leased to Intelsat, who operate them under the designation Intelsat APR-2.

INSAT-2E was launched by Arianespace, using an Ariane 42P carrier rocket flying from ELA-2 at the Guiana Space Centre. The launch occurred at 22:03 UTC on 2 April 1999. Following launch, it raised itself into geostationary orbit using liquid-fuelled apogee motor. Its final insertion burn occurred at 07:38 UTC on 8 April. Following insertion, it was positioned at a longitude of 83° East.

INSAT-2E is using ultra-light Magnesium-lithium alloys developed by DMRL.The Magnesium-lithium sheets were supplied to ISAC, Bangalore center.

== See also ==
- 1999 in spaceflight
- List of Indian satellites
