= Telstar 4 =

Communications satellite owned by AT&T Corporation

- Mission type: Communication
- Operator: AT&T
- COSPAR ID: 1995-049A
- SATCAT no.: 23670
- Mission duration: 12 years (planned)

Spacecraft properties
- Bus: AS-7000
- Manufacturer: Lockheed Martin
- Launch mass: 3,410 kilograms (7,520 lb)

Start of mission
- Launch date: September 24, 1995, 00:06 UTC
- Rocket: Ariane-42L H10-3
- Launch site: Kourou ELA-2

End of mission
- Last contact: September 19, 2003

Orbital parameters
- Reference system: Geocentric
- Regime: Geostationary
- Longitude: 89° W

Telstar 4 (also called Telstar 402R and Telstar 403) was a communications satellite owned by AT&T Corporation.

Telstar 4 was successfully launched into space on September 24, 1995, by means of an Ariane-42L vehicle from the Kourou Space Center, French Guiana. It had a launch mass of 3,410 kg.

Telstar 4 stopped operating on September 19, 2003, after a short circuit in the primary power bus.
