= UPM-Sat =

Spanish artificial satellites

UPM-Sat 1
- SATCAT no.: 1995-033C
- Mission duration: 213 days

Spacecraft properties
- Manufacturer: Technical University of Madrid
- Launch mass: 47 kilograms (104 lb)

Start of mission
- Launch date: July 7, 1995
- Rocket: Ariane IV-40
- Launch site: Guiana Space Centre

Orbital parameters
- Reference system: Geocentric
- Regime: Sun-synchronous polar orbit
- Perigee altitude: 670 kilometres (420 mi)
- Apogee altitude: 670 kilometres (420 mi)
- Inclination: 98.1 degrees
- Period: 98 minutes

UPM-Sat 2
- SATCAT no.: 2020-061E
- Mission duration: 2 years (expected)

Spacecraft properties
- Manufacturer: Technical University of Madrid
- Launch mass: 45 kilograms (99 lb)

Start of mission
- Launch date: September 3, 2020
- Rocket: Vega
- Launch site: Guiana Space Centre

Orbital parameters
- Reference system: Geocentric
- Regime: Sun-synchronous polar orbit
- Perigee altitude: 600 kilometres (370 mi)
- Apogee altitude: 600 kilometres (370 mi)

UPM-Sat is a series of Spanish microsatellites developed by the Technical University of Madrid (UPM), in collaboration with the Instituto Nacional de Técnica Aeroespacial (INTA), for educational, scientific and technological purposes.

== UPM-Sat 1 ==
The UPM-Sat 1, also called UPM/LB-Sat, was launched on July 7, 1995, from French Guiana on the flight V75 of the Ariane IV-40 launcher. It weighed 47 kg. It had an operational life in orbit of 213 days, with a Sun-synchronous polar orbit at an altitude of 670 kilometers, completing one revolution around the Earth every 98 minutes.

== UPM-Sat 2 ==
The UPM-Sat 2 project aimed to develop a satellite with a mass less than 50 kg and overall dimensions less than 0.5 m x 0.5 m x 0.6 m. The UPM-Sat 2 satellite, also called M.A.T.I.A.S., was originally scheduled to launch in 1999. It was finally launched on September 3, 2020, on the flight VV16 of the Vega rocket.
