= Intelsat 706 =

Geostationary communications satellite

- Mission type: Communications
- Operator: Intelsat
- COSPAR ID: 1995-023A
- SATCAT no.: 23571
- Mission duration: 15 years design life

Spacecraft properties
- Bus: SSL-1300
- Manufacturer: Space Systems/Loral
- Launch mass: 4,180 kilograms (9,220 lb)
- Dry mass: 1,450 kilograms (3,200 lb)
- Dimensions: 2.7 by 2.2 by 2.45 metres (8.9 ft × 7.2 ft × 8.0 ft)

Start of mission
- Launch date: 17 May 1995, 06:34 UTC
- Rocket: Ariane 44 LP H10-3
- Launch site: Kourou ELA-2

End of mission
- Disposal: Decommissioned
- Deactivated: November 2014

Orbital parameters
- Reference system: Geocentric
- Regime: Geostationary
- Longitude: 157° E
- Perigee altitude: 36,126 kilometres (22,448 mi)
- Apogee altitude: 36,138 kilometres (22,455 mi)
- Inclination: 4.36°
- Period: 1,454.0 minutes
- Epoch: April 27, 2017

Transponders
- Band: 26 C band 14 Ku band

Intelsat 706 (also known as IS-706 and Intelsat 7-F6) is a geostationary communication satellite that was built by Space Systems/Loral (SSL). It is located in the orbital position of 157 degrees east longitude and it is currently in an inclined orbit. The same is owned by Intelsat. The satellite was based on the LS-1300 platform and its estimated useful life was 15 years.

The satellite was successfully launched into space on May 17, 1995, at 06:34, using an Ariane 4 vehicle from the Guiana Space Centre, Kourou, French Guiana. It had a launch mass of 4,180 kg.

The Intelsat 706 is equipped with 26 transponders in C band and 10 in Ku band to provide broadcasting, business-to-home services and telecommunications. It was positioned over the Atlantic Ocean and has the transponder capacity to relay 110,000 telephone calls simultaneously.

== Specifications ==
- Payload power: 3612 W
- Power: Equinox: 5326 W, Solstice: 4884 W
- Stabilization: 3-axis
- Solar array: 25.7 m span
- Propulsion: R-4D-11

== Location in orbit ==
- 56° W (May 1995 - June 1995)
- 53° W (July 1995 - September 2004)
- 50.25° E (October 2004 - April 2009)
- 54.85° E (April 2009 - July 2010)
- 72.1° E (August 2010 - October 2011)
- 72.1° E inclined (October 2011 - August 2012)
- 157° E inclined (February 2013 - November 2014)

== Transponders ==
- Mass of the transponders: 412 kilograms (908 lb)
- Mass of the antennas: 113 kilograms (249 lb)

C band

- Power: 10, 20 and 30 W
- Bandwidth: 10 transponders of 36 MHz, 2 transponders of 41 MHz and 16 transponders of 72 MHz
- EIRP: Global beam (36 & 41 MHz): 29 dBW / Hemispheric beam (8x72 MHz & 2x36 MHz): 33 dBW / Zone beam (8x72 MHz & 2x36 MHz): 33 dBW / Spot beam (36 & 41 MHz): 36.1 dBW

Polarization: circular R/L

K_{u} band

- Power: 5 transponders of 49 W and 5 transponders of 73 W
- Bandwidth: 6 transponders of 72 MHz and 8 transponders of 112 MHz
- EIRP: Spot 1: 47 dBW, Spot 2: 47 dBW and Spot 3: 42.8 dBW
- Polarization: linear
- Frequency: Downlink 10.95 GHz - 11.20 GHz, 11.45 GHz - 11.70 GHz, 11.70 GHz - 11.95 GHz and 12.50 GHz - 12.75 GHz

== See also ==
- 1995 in spaceflight
