= Telkom-1 =

Indonesian communications satellite

- Mission type: Communications
- Operator: PT Telkom
- COSPAR ID: 1999-042A
- SATCAT no.: 25880
- Website: https://www.telkom.co.id/sites
- Mission duration: 15 years (planned); 18 years (achieved)

Spacecraft properties
- Spacecraft: Telkom-1
- Spacecraft type: LM-A2100
- Bus: LM-A2100A
- Manufacturer: Lockheed Martin
- Launch mass: 2,763 kg (6,091 lb)
- Dry mass: 1,700 kg (3,700 lb)

Start of mission
- Launch date: 12 August 1999, 22:52 UTC
- Rocket: Ariane 42P H10-3 (V118)
- Launch site: Centre Spatial Guyanais, Kourou, ELA-2
- Contractor: Arianespace
- Entered service: October 1999

End of mission
- Last contact: 25 August 2017

Orbital parameters
- Reference system: Geocentric orbit
- Regime: Geostationary orbit
- Longitude: 108° East

Transponders
- Band: 36 C-band
- Coverage area: Indonesia, Australia

Telkom-1 was a geosynchronous communications satellite built by Lockheed Martin, (Sunnyvale, California), for Indonesia's state-owned telecommunications company, PT Telekomunikasi Indonesia Tbk (PT Telkom). It operated for almost 18 years, more than two years past designed lifetime of 15 years.

== Launch ==
Telkom-1 was successfully launched 12 August 1999, by an Ariane-42P H10-3, from Centre Spatial Guyanais, pad ELA-2, Kourou, French Guiana, at 22:52 UTC and positioned in geostationary orbit, at 108° East for replaced Palapa-B2R.

== Satellite description ==
Based on Lockheed Martin A2100A satellite bus, Telkom-1 features communications satellite technology, with 24 C-band and 12 Enhanced C-band transponders. The new spacecraft replaced on-orbit Palapa-B2R satellite, improve communications coverage across Indonesia, and allow PT Telkom to expand its coverage area into Southeast Asia and the Indian subcontinent. Launch had been delayed because of problems with comsat manufacturing. Telkom-1 is a successor to the Palapa series of satellites, the first (Palapa-A1) of which was launched in 1976. Mass of Telkom-1 is 2,763 kg (6,091 lb) launch, 1,700 kg (3,700 lb) in geostationary orbit (GEO).

== Mission ==
Telkom-1 had developed problems with the south solar panel drive, due to a manufacturing error. The satellite was planned to be decommissioned in 2018 and to be replaced by Telkom-4. On 25 August 2017, Telkom-1 lost contact and suffered a massive debris shedding event, and Telkom-1 was retired without being able to move itself into a graveyard orbit.
