= Intelsat 801 =

Geosynchronous communications spacecraft

- Mission type: Communications
- Operator: Intelsat
- COSPAR ID: 1997-009A
- SATCAT no.: 24742
- Mission duration: 16 years

Spacecraft properties
- Bus: AS-7000
- Manufacturer: Lockheed Martin
- Launch mass: 3,245 kilograms (7,154 lb)
- Dry mass: 1,601 kilograms (3,530 lb)
- Dimensions: 2.46 m × 2.16 m × 3.15 m (8.1 ft × 7.1 ft × 10.3 ft)
- Power: 6400 W

Start of mission
- Launch date: March 1, 1997, 01:07:42 UTC
- Rocket: Ariane-44P H10-3
- Launch site: Kourou ELA-2
- Contractor: Arianespace

End of mission
- Disposal: Decommissioned
- Deactivated: October 2013

Orbital parameters
- Reference system: Geocentric
- Regime: Geostationary now graveyard orbit
- Longitude: 47° W (first position); 31.5° W (current position)
- Perigee altitude: 35,772 kilometers (22,228 mi)
- Apogee altitude: 35,798 kilometers (22,244 mi)
- Inclination: 0.1°
- Period: 1,436.1 minutes
- Epoch: March 1, 1997

Transponders
- Frequency: Uplink: 14.00-14.50 GHz; Downlink: 10.95-11.2 GHz, 11.7-11.95 GHz, 12.5-12.75 GHz and 11.45-11.70 GHz
- Coverage area: Europe, Africa, Asia

Intelsat 801 is a geosynchronous communications spacecraft that was launched on March 01, 1997 by an 4L rocket from Kourou in French Guiana to provide voice and video communications to the member countries in that consortium after parking at 174° E longitude. It carries 38 C Band and 6 Ku Band transponders. It was built for US$76 million, launched for US$86 million and insured for US$27 million.

== Specifications ==
- Stabilization: 3-axis
- Propulsion: 2 × LEROS-1B
- Transponders: 38 C band / 6 K_{u} band
- Power: C band 7-38 W / K_{u} band 43 W
- EIRP: 52.6-44.0 dBW (spot 1) / 51.6-44.0 dBW (spot 2)
- Bandwidth: C band 36 and 72 MHz / K_{u} band 72 MHz and 112 MHz

== See also ==
- Graveyard orbit
