= Intelsat 904 =

Communications satellite operated by Intelsat

- Mission type: Communications
- Operator: Intelsat
- COSPAR ID: 2002-007A
- SATCAT no.: 27380
- Mission duration: 13 years

Spacecraft properties
- Spacecraft type: SSL-1300HL
- Manufacturer: Space Systems/Loral
- Launch mass: 4,680.0 kg (10,317.6 lb)
- Dry mass: 2,350.0 kg (5,180.9 lb)
- Power: 8 kW

Start of mission
- Launch date: February 23, 2002, 06:59 UTC
- Rocket: Ariane 44L H10-3
- Launch site: Kourou ELA-2

Orbital parameters
- Reference system: Geocentric
- Regime: Geostationary
- Longitude: 60° west
- Semi-major axis: 42,164.0 kilometres (26,199.5 mi)
- Eccentricity: 0.0002497
- Perigee altitude: 35,782.7 kilometres (22,234.3 mi)
- Apogee altitude: 35,803.7 kilometres (22,247.4 mi)
- Inclination: 0.0474°
- Period: 1,436.1 minutes
- RAAN: 105.7301°
- Epoch: May 21, 2017
- Revolution no.: 1853

Transponders
- Band: 72 C band and 22 K_{u} band
- Bandwidth: 36 MHz
- Coverage area: Asia, Australia and Europe
- EIRP: 36 dBW (C Band) 54 dBW (K_{u} band Europe)

Intelsat 904 (or IS-904) is a communications satellite operated by Intelsat.

== Launch ==
Intelsat 904 was launched by an Ariane 4 rocket from Guiana Space Centre, Kourou, French Guiana, at 06:59 UTC on February 23, 2002.

== Capacity and coverage ==
The 4,680-kilogram (10,320 lb) satellite provides television and internet services to Europe, Asia and Australia through its 76 C band and 22 Ku band transponders after parking over 60 degrees east longitude.

== See also ==
- 2002 in spaceflight
