= Intelsat 901 =

Communications satellite

Coordinates: 0°N 18°W

- Intelsat 901 satellite seen in orbit by MEV-1
- Names: IS-901
- Mission type: Communications
- Operator: Intelsat
- COSPAR ID: 2001-024A
- SATCAT no.: 26824
- Mission duration: 13 years (planned); 23 years, 10 months (total)

Spacecraft properties
- Spacecraft: Intelsat 901
- Spacecraft type: SSL 1300
- Bus: SSL 1300HL
- Manufacturer: Space Systems/Loral
- Launch mass: 4,725 kg (10,417 lb)
- Power: 8.6 kW

Start of mission
- Launch date: 9 June 2001, 06:45 UTC
- Rocket: Ariane 44L (VA141)
- Launch site: Centre Spatial Guyanais, ELA-2
- Contractor: Arianespace

End of mission
- Disposal: Decommissioned
- Deactivated: 9 April 2025

Orbital parameters
- Reference system: Geocentric orbit
- Regime: Geostationary orbit
- Longitude: Current position: 27.5° West; First orbital position: 67.5° West

Transponders
- Band: 56 transponders: 44 C-band; 12 Ku-band
- Bandwidth: 36 and 72 MHz
- EIRP: C-band global beam 36 dBW; C-band Hemi Beam 38 dBW; C-band beam zone 38 dBW; Ku-band 53 dBW Europe Spot 1 Ku-band 52 dBw Europe Spot 2

Docking with MEV-1
- Docking date: 25 February 2020, 07:15 UTC
- Undocking date: 9 April 2025, 15:04 UTC
- Time docked: 5 years, 1 month, 14 days

Intelsat 901 (IS-901) is the first of nine Intelsat satellites launched in June 2001 at 18° West, providing Ku-band spot beam coverage for Europe and C-band coverage for the Atlantic Ocean region. It is capable of selectable split uplink for Satellite news gathering (SNG), tailored for increased communications demands such as DTH and Internet.

== Satellite ==
Intelsat 901 was launched by an Ariane 4 from the Centre Spatial Guyanais in French Guiana on 9 June 2001 at 06:45 UTC.

- Increased power – Intelsat 901 is designed to provide up to 5 dB for downlink EIRP, and up to 1.8 dB for G/T over the Intelsat 7 series satellites.
- Increased Capacity – with over 72 C-band, 36 MHz equivalent unit transponders, Intelsat 901 provides a significant increase in capacity over the previous satellite at 18° West.
- Improved Coverage – Intelsat 901 provides significantly expanded zone coverage. The Ku-band spot beams also include more areas within each zone.

== Encounter with Russian Olymp-K satellite ==
On 9 October 2015, SpaceNews reported that in April 2015, the Russian satellite Olymp-K had moved to within 10 km (6.2 mi) of Intelsat 901 and the nearby Intelsat 7, causing concerns of a safety-of-flight incident. Attempts by Intelsat to contact the Russian satellite operators were unsuccessful and no reason for the satellite's movement was given by the Russian government. The move sparked classified meetings within the Department of Defense and heightened suspicions that Olymp-K satellite was performing signals intelligence, or was possibly an anti-satellite weapon.

== Mission Extension Vehicle-1 (MEV-1) ==
On 9 October 2019, Mission Extension Vehicle-1 (MEV-1) launched from Baikonur Cosmodrome in Kazakhstan on a Proton-M launch vehicle. Its mission is to dock with Intelsat 901 and extend its operational lifespan by performing station-keeping for the aging satellite. Before the docking of MEV-1 and Intelsat 901, ground controllers transitioned customers off of Intelsat 901 and moved the satellite to a graveyard orbit in December 2019 so that Intelsat 37e could use its orbital slot.

Docking occurred on 25 February 2020 at 07:15 UTC. MEV-1 rendezvoused with Intelsat 901, reached out with mechanical fingers, and grabbed the target craft using its liquid propellant engine as a grapple point to pull the two satellites together. Over the next two months, Northrop Grumman and satellite prime contractor Space Systems/Loral performed tests on the satellites' systems before using MEV-1 to lower Intelsat 901 back to the geosynchronous arc at 27.5° West (332.5° East) orbital longitude, where it will remain for five years.

On 17 April 2020, Intelsat and Northrop Grumman announced that Intelsat 901 had officially returned to operational service on 2 April 2020 at its new orbital longitude. The satellite replaces Intelsat 907, a 17-year-old satellite now four years past its design life. After five years, MEV-1 will move Intelsat 901 back to a final graveyard orbit and release it before moving to another potential client.

On 9 April 2025 Intelsat declared an end of mission and MEV-1 moved Intelsat 901 into the graveyard orbit and undocked. Northrop Grumman will now return to GEO for Optus D3, the next target to lock onto now that its 5-year mission with Intelsat is over.

== Ku-band specifications ==
- Total transponders: Ku-Band up to 22 (in equivalent 36 MHz units)
- Polarization: Ku-Band Linear - Horizontal or Vertical
- Uplink frequency: Ku-Band 14.00 to 14.50 GHz
- Downlink frequency: Ku-Band 10.95 to 11.20 GHz and 11.45 to 11.70 GHz
- G/T (Ku-Band) (Beam Peak): Spot 1: up to +9.0 dB/K, Spot 2: up to +9.0 dB/K
- SFD Range (Beam Edge): Ku-Band -87.0 to -69.0 dBW/m^{2}
