= Intelsat 701 =

Geostationary communications satellite

- Mission type: Communications
- Operator: Intelsat
- COSPAR ID: 1993-066A
- SATCAT no.: 22871
- Mission duration: 15 years design life

Spacecraft properties
- Bus: SSL-1300
- Manufacturer: Space Systems/Loral
- Launch mass: 3,642 kilograms (8,029 lb)
- Dry mass: 1,450 kilograms (3,200 lb)

Start of mission
- Launch date: 22 October 1993, 06:46 UTC
- Rocket: Ariane 44LP H10
- Launch site: Kourou ELA-2

End of mission
- Disposal: Decommissioned

Orbital parameters
- Reference system: Geocentric
- Regime: Geostationary
- Longitude: 29.5° W
- Semi-major axis: 42,164 kilometres (26,199 mi)
- Perigee altitude: 35,776.5 kilometres (22,230.5 mi)
- Apogee altitude: 35,810.9 kilometres (22,251.9 mi)
- Inclination: 4.1 degrees
- Period: 1,436.1 minutes

Transponders
- Band: 26 C band 10 Ku band

Intelsat 701 (also known as IS-701 and Intelsat 7-F1) is a geostationary communication satellite that was built by Space Systems/Loral (SSL). It is located in the orbital position of 29.5 degrees east longitude and it is currently in an inclined orbit. The same is owned by Intelsat. The satellite was based on the LS-1300 platform and its estimated useful life was 15 years.

The satellite was successfully launched into space on October 22, 1993, at 06:46:00 UTC, using an Ariane 44L vehicle from the Guiana Space Center in French Guiana. It had a launch mass of 3,642 kg.

The Intelsat 701 is equipped with 26 transponders in C band and 10 in Ku band to provide broadcasting, business-to-home services, telecommunications, VSATnetworks.
