= Intelsat 707 =

Geostationary communications satellite

- Names: IS-707; Intelsat 7-F7
- Mission type: Communications
- Operator: Intelsat
- COSPAR ID: 1996-015A
- SATCAT no.: 23816
- Mission duration: 15 years (planned), 15 years (achieved)

Spacecraft properties
- Bus: SSL-1300
- Manufacturer: SSL
- Launch mass: 4,180 kg (9,220 lb)
- Dry mass: 1,450 kg (3,200 lb)
- Power: 3600 watts

Start of mission
- Launch date: 14 March 1996, 07:11:01 UTC
- Rocket: Ariane 44P
- Launch site: Kourou, ELA-2
- Contractor: Arianespace

End of mission
- Disposal: Decommissioned
- Deactivated: January 2011

Orbital parameters
- Reference system: Geocentric orbit
- Regime: Geostationary orbit
- Longitude: 157° East

Transponders
- Band: 26 C-band; 14 Ku-band
- Coverage area: Europe, Americas, Brazil

Intelsat 707 (also known as IS-707 and Intelsat 7-F7) is a geostationary communications satellite that was built by Space Systems/Loral (SSL). It is located in the orbital position of 53° west longitude.. The satellite is owned by Intelsat. The satellite was based on the LS-1300 platform and its estimated useful life was 15 years.

== Launch ==
The satellite was successfully launched into space on 14 March 1996, at 07:11:01 UTC, using an Ariane 4 vehicle from the Guiana Space Centre, Kourou, French Guiana. It had a launch mass of 4,180 kg. The Intelsat 707 carried 26 C-band and 14 Ku-band transponders to provide Europe and the Americas with 3 television channels and 22,500 telephone circuits after parking over the eastern coast of Brazil.

== See also ==
- 1996 in spaceflight
