= Eutelsat 16B =

Egyptian communications satellite

- Names: Hot Bird 4 (1998–2005); Atlantic Bird 4 (2006–2009); Eurobird 16 (2009–2012); Eutelsat 16B (2012–2015) Leased capacity: Nilesat 103 (2005–2006)
- Mission type: Communications (direct-to-home)
- Operator: EUTELSAT
- COSPAR ID: 1998-013A
- SATCAT no.: 25237
- Mission duration: 17 years (achieved)

Spacecraft properties
- Bus: Eurostar-2000+
- Manufacturer: British Aerospace and Matra Marconi Space
- Launch mass: 2900 kg
- Dry mass: 1310 kg
- Power: 5500 watts

Start of mission
- Launch date: 27 February 1998, 22:38:00 UTC
- Rocket: Ariane 42P H10-3
- Launch site: Centre Spatial Guyanais, ELA-2
- Contractor: Arianespace

End of mission
- Disposal: Graveyard orbit
- Deactivated: 2015

Orbital parameters
- Reference system: Geocentric orbit
- Regime: Geostationary orbit
- Longitude: 13° East (1998–2005); 7° West (2005–2009); 16° East (2009–2015)
- Slot: Hot Bird (1998–2005)

Transponders
- Band: 20 Ku-band
- Coverage area: Africa, Middle East, Asia

Eutelsat 16B, formerly known as Hot Bird 4, Nilesat 103, Atlantic Bird 4, and Eurobird 16, is a communications satellite owned and operated by Eutelsat. The satellite was retired in 2015 and was moved into a graveyard orbit above the geostationary belt.

== Spacecraft ==
Hot Bird 4 was a geostationary communications spacecraft of the European Eutelsat consortium. With a constellation of 5 satellites, the Hot Bird family at 13° East formed one of the largest broadcasting systems in the world. By fourth-quarter 1998, the system was delivering over 320 analogue and digital television channels, as well as radio and multimedia services, to more than 70 million homes connected to a cable network or equipped for satellite (direct-to-home) reception. The Hot Bird satellites provided full coverage of Europe and also took in parts of Africa and Asia, including the entire Middle East. In addition to the basic Widebeam and Superbeam, Hot Bird 3 and Hot Bird 4 were equipped with a Steerable Beam which could be oriented anywhere visible from 13° East, either northern or southern hemispheres. Hot Bird 4 and Hot Bird 5 were the first in the world to be equipped with SKYPLEX for on-board multiplexing of digital signals into a single DVB stream which could be received in the downlink by standard IRDs.

== Launch ==
The satellite was launched on 27 February 1998 at 22:38:00 UTC, from the Centre Spatial Guyanais in Kourou by an Ariane 42P launcher under the name of Hot Bird 4, under Eutelsat's Hot Bird brand.

== Orbit ==
The satellite was positioned in geostationary orbit at a longitude of 13° East, co-located with the rest of the Hot Bird constellation. Following the launches of Hot Bird 7A and Hot Bird 8 in 2006, the satellite was moved to 7° West under the Atlantic Bird brand, and renamed Atlantic Bird 4. During this time, some of the satellite's capacity was leased to Egyptian operator Nilesat, who marketed the satellite as Nilesat 103.

== Mission ==
Nilesat used the satellite, alongside Nilesat 101 and Nilesat 102 which were located in the same orbital slot, to provide direct-to-home digital TV channels, data transmission, turbo internet, and multicasting applications to more than 15 million viewers in the North African and Middle East region.

In April 2009, the satellite was repositioned to 16° East and renamed Eurobird 16 as part of Eutelsat's Eurobird brand; it was replaced at 7° West by Atlantic Bird 4A. In March 2012, the satellite was renamed Eutelsat 16B when the company unified its brand name.

== See also ==
- Atlantic Bird
- Hot Bird
