= Intelsat 6B =

Satellite providing television and communication services for Intelsat

- Names: PAS-6B; IS-6B
- Mission type: Communications
- Operator: PanAmSat / Intelsat
- COSPAR ID: 1998-075A
- SATCAT no.: 25585
- Website: http://www.intelsat.com
- Mission duration: 15 years (planned); 27 years, 4 months, 22 days (elapsed)

Spacecraft properties
- Spacecraft: PAS-6B
- Spacecraft type: Boeing 601
- Bus: HS-601HP
- Manufacturer: Hughes Space and Communications
- Launch mass: 3,470 kg (7,650 lb)
- Power: 8 kW

Start of mission
- Launch date: 22 December 1998, 01:08 UTC
- Rocket: Ariane 42L H10-3 (V115)
- Launch site: Centre Spatial Guyanais, ELA-2
- Contractor: Arianespace
- Entered service: February 1999

Orbital parameters
- Reference system: Geocentric orbit
- Regime: Geostationary orbit

Transponders
- Band: 32 Ku-band
- Coverage area: South America

Intelsat 6B (IS-6B, PAS-6B) was a satellite providing television and communication services for Intelsat, which it was commissioned by in 2006.

== Satellite description ==
It was manufactured by Hughes Space and Communications. At beginning of life, it generates 8 kW. This version takes advantage of such advances as dual-junction gallium arsenide solar cells, new battery technology and the first commercial use of a high-efficiency xenon ion propulsion system (XIPS).

== Launch ==
The satellite was launched on 22 December 1998, 01:08 UTC, on an Ariane 42L H10-3 launch vehicle from the Centre Spatial Guyanais at Kourou in French Guiana. PAS-6B provides satellite services in South America, including direct-to-home (DTH) television services.

== Mission ==
In 2003, PAS 6B lost the secondary XIPS engines additionally to the earlier loss of the primaries, which will lead to a reduced lifetime.
