= Clémentine (satellite) =

French military satellite

- Mission type: reconnaissance satellite
- COSPAR ID: 1999-064B
- SATCAT no.: 25978

Spacecraft properties
- Bus: SSTL-70
- Manufacturer: Alcatel Space · Surrey Satellite Technology
- Launch mass: 50 kg (110 lb)
- Dimensions: 0.6 × 0.3 × 0.3 m (1.97 × 0.98 × 0.98 ft)

Start of mission
- Launch date: 3 December 1999, 16:22 UTC
- Rocket: Ariane 4 V-124
- Launch site: Guiana Space Centre ELA-2
- Contractor: Arianespace

Orbital parameters
- Reference system: Geocentric
- Regime: Sun-synchronous
- Eccentricity: 0.0009381
- Perigee altitude: 573 km (356 mi)
- Apogee altitude: 586 km (364 mi)
- Inclination: 98.2500°
- Mean motion: 14.96 rev/day
- Epoch: 27 December 2016, 12:25:58 UTC

Clémentine (pronounced [klemɑ̃tin]) is a small satellite built by Alcatel Space (now Thales) for the French DGA, ostensibly "to study the Earth's radio-electrical environment from space."

It is a successor to the Cerise satellite.
