= Eutelsat 4A =

Eutelsat communications satellite

- Names: Orion 2 (pre-launch); RESSAT (pre-launch); Eutelsat W1 (2000–2009); Eurobird 4A (2009–2012); Eutelsat 4A (2012–present)
- Mission type: Communications
- Operator: Eutelsat
- COSPAR ID: 2000-052A
- SATCAT no.: 26487
- Mission duration: 12 years

Spacecraft properties
- Bus: Eurostar-2000+
- Manufacturer: Astrium
- Launch mass: 3,250 kilograms (7,170 lb)

Start of mission
- Launch date: 6 September 2000, 22:33 UTC
- Rocket: Ariane 44P-3
- Launch site: Kourou ELA-2
- Contractor: Arianespace

Orbital parameters
- Reference system: Geocentric
- Regime: Geosynchronous
- Longitude: 10° East (2000–2009); 4° East (2009–present)

Eutelsat 4A, previously Eurobird 4A and Eutelsat W1 is a French communications satellite which is operated by Eutelsat. It was constructed by Astrium is based on the Eurostar-2000+ satellite bus. Its launch was contracted by Arianespace, using an Ariane 4 44P-3 carrier rocket. The launch occurred on 6 September 2000, at 22:33 UTC from ELA-2 at the Guiana Space Centre.

It was originally built as Orion 2 for Orion Network Systems. This was later cancelled when Orion merged with Loral Skynet, who opted to procure satellites from their sister company, Space Systems Loral. It was subsequently sold to Eutelsat as a backup satellite and designated RESSAT. It was subsequently launched in place of the original Eutelsat W1, which was damaged whilst under construction and eventually launched as Eutelsat W5.

Following its launch and on-orbit testing, it was placed in geostationary orbit at 10° East, from where it provided broadcast and communications services to Europe using wide-band feeds. In June 2009, it was moved to 4° East, and redesignated Eurobird 4A. It carries twenty eight transponders, and has an expected on-orbit lifespan of 12 years.

In 2012 it was renamed Eutelsat 4A.
