= List of Ariane launches =

Rockets from the Ariane rocket family have accumulated 260 launches since 1979, 248 of which were successful, yielding a 95.4% success rate. The recently retired Ariane 5, flew 82 consecutive missions without failure between April 2003 and December 2017, but suffered a malfunction during flight VA-241 in January 2018, causing its two satellites to reach an incorrect orbit, and reducing their predicted lifetime as they consumed some of their own fuel to raise their orbits.

For launches in a specific decade, see:

- List of Ariane launches (1979–1989)
- List of Ariane launches (1990–1999)
- List of Ariane launches (2000–2009)
- List of Ariane launches (2010–2019)
- List of Ariane launches (2020–2029)

== Launch statistics ==
=== Rocket configurations ===
- Ariane 1
- Ariane 2
- Ariane 3
- Ariane 4 40
- Ariane 4 42L
- Ariane 4 42P
- Ariane 4 44L
- Ariane 4 44P
- Ariane 4 44LP
- Ariane 5 G
- Ariane 5 G+
- Ariane 5 GS
- Ariane 5 ECA
- Ariane 5 ES
- Ariane 62

=== Launch outcomes ===
- Failure
- Partial failure
- Success
- Planned

Statistics are up to date as of 5 November 2025.
