= ST-2 =

Geostationary telecommunications satellite

- Mission type: Communications
- Operator: Singapore Telecom; Chunghwa Telecom
- COSPAR ID: 2011-022B
- SATCAT no.: 37606
- Mission duration: 15 years

Spacecraft properties
- Bus: DS-2000
- Manufacturer: Mitsubishi Electric
- Launch mass: 5,090 kilograms (11,220 lb)

Start of mission
- Launch date: 20 May 2011, 20:38 UTC
- Rocket: Ariane 5ECA VA202
- Launch site: Kourou ELA-3
- Contractor: Arianespace

Orbital parameters
- Reference system: Geocentric
- Regime: Geostationary
- Longitude: 88° east
- Perigee altitude: 35,785 kilometres (22,236 mi)
- Apogee altitude: 35,799 kilometres (22,244 mi)
- Inclination: 0.00 degrees
- Period: 23.93 hours
- Epoch: 29 October 2013, 17:11:17 UTC

ST-2 is a telecommunications satellite made by Mitsubishi Electric. It was launched on May 20, 2011 atop an Ariane 5 ECA rocket from ESA's Guiana Space Centre in a dual-launch mission with GSAT-8. a ST-2 is a replacement for the ST-1 satellite. It is built around the DS2000 spacecraft bus. It is in geosynchronous orbit at 88 deg. East, and is operated by the ST-2 Satellite Ventures joint company of Singapore Telecommunications (SingTel) and Chunghwa Telecom. It provides relay services over the Middle East, Central Asia, India and Southeast Asia.
