= Intelsat 907 =

Communications satellite

- Mission type: Communications
- Operator: Intelsat
- COSPAR ID: 2003-007A
- SATCAT no.: 27683
- Mission duration: Planned: 13 years; Achieved: 17 years

Spacecraft properties
- Spacecraft type: SSL 1300HL
- Manufacturer: Space Systems/Loral
- Launch mass: 4,685.0 kg (10,328.7 lb)
- Dry mass: 1,973.0 kg (4,349.7 lb)
- Power: watts

Start of mission
- Launch date: February 15, 2003, 07:00 UTC
- Rocket: Ariane 44L H10-3
- Launch site: Kourou ELA-2
- Contractor: Arianespace

End of mission
- Disposal: Graveyard orbit
- Deactivated: 2 April 2020

Orbital parameters
- Reference system: Geocentric
- Regime: Geostationary
- Longitude: 27.5° west
- Semi-major axis: 42,164.0 km (26,199.5 mi)
- Perigee altitude: 35,775.1 km (22,229.6 mi)
- Apogee altitude: 35,812.9 km (22,253.1 mi)
- Inclination: 0.0°
- Period: 1,436.1 minutes
- Epoch: May 23, 2017

Transponders
- Band: 72 C band and 23 K_{u} band
- Bandwidth: 36 MHz
- Coverage area: Africa, Australia, Europe, India, Russia
- EIRP: 36-48 dBW (C band) 53 dBW (K_{u} band)

Intelsat 907 (or IS-907) was a communications satellite operated by Intelsat.

== Launch ==
Intelsat 907 was launched by an Ariane 4 rocket from Guiana Space Centre, French Guiana, at 06:44 UTC on February 15, 2003.

== Capacity and coverage ==
The 4.7 tonne spacecraft provided data-relay among installations in North America, South America, Western Europe and Africa through its array of C band and Ku band transponders after parking over 27.5 degrees west longitude. It replaced the aging Intelsat 605.

== Replacement ==
On 2 April 2020, the Intelsat 907 was replaced by the Intelsat 901 satellite. Before this, Intelsat 901 had been taken out of operation (having operated for about 18 years in another orbital slot) and moved into graveyard orbit where it docked with Mission Extension Vehicle-1 (MEV-1), a satellite service craft. MEV-1 then took responsibility of propulsion and attitude control of the satellite pair. The satellites then descended back to geostationary arc, where Intelsat 901 then replaced Intelsat 907's communications responsibilities. Intelsat 901 took over from Intelsat 907 on 2 April 2020. It is expected that the Intelsat 901 will operate for five more years, after which MEV-1 will again raise it to graveyard orbit for decommissioning.

== See also ==
- 2003 in spaceflight
