= Intelsat 602 =

Geostationary communications satellite

Coordinates: 0°N 179.36°W

- Mission type: Communication
- Operator: Intelsat
- COSPAR ID: 1989-087A
- SATCAT no.: 20315
- Mission duration: 13 years (planned); 23 years (achieved)

Spacecraft properties
- Bus: HS-389
- Manufacturer: Hughes
- Launch mass: 4,215 kilograms (9,292 lb)

Start of mission
- Launch date: 27 October 1989, 23:05:00 UTC
- Rocket: Ariane 44L V34
- Launch site: Kourou ELA-2
- Contractor: Arianespace

End of mission
- Disposal: Decommissioned
- Deactivated: July 2012

Orbital parameters
- Reference system: Geocentric
- Regime: Geostationary
- Longitude: 37° W (first position)
- Perigee altitude: 35,726 kilometres (22,199 mi)
- Apogee altitude: 35,849 kilometres (22,276 mi)
- Inclination: 0.1 degrees
- Period: 1436.14 minutes
- Epoch: 27 November 1989

Intelsat 602, also known as IS-602 and previously named Intelsat VI F-2, is a communications satellite operated by Intelsat. Launched in 1989, it was the first of five Intelsat VI satellites to be launched. The Intelsat VI series was constructed by Hughes Aircraft, based on the HS-389 satellite bus. Intelsat 602 was decommissioned in July 2012.

== History ==
Intelsat 602 was launched at 23:05:00 UTC on 27 October 1989, atop an Ariane 4 44L carrier rocket, flight number V34. The launch took place from ELA-2 at Kourou, and placed Intelsat 602 into a geosynchronous transfer orbit. The satellite raised itself into its final geostationary orbit using two liquid-fuelled R-4D-12 engines, with the satellite arriving in geostationary orbit on 31 October 1989.

Intelsat 602 initially operated in a geostationary orbit with a perigee of 35,726 kilometres (22,199 mi), an apogee of 35,849 kilometres (22,276 mi), and 0.1 degrees of inclination, however its inclination has increased over time. The satellite carried 38 IEEE C band and ten IEEE K_{u} band transponders, and had a design life of 13 years and a mass of 4,215 kilograms (9,292 lb).

After launch, Intelsat 602 was positioned at a longitude of 37 degrees west until January 1991, when it was moved to 24.5 degrees west. It left this position in February 1992, and arrived at 60 degrees east in April 1992. Later the same month the satellite was again relocated, and was next operated at 63 degrees east between October 1992 and October 1997. It then moved to 62 degrees East where it operated until November 2001 when it was moved to 32.9 degrees east, arriving in December. Between May and July 2003, it was moved to 50.5 degrees east, and between December 2004 and June 2005 it moved to 150.5 degrees east, where it was operated under an agreement with Indosat until May 2007. It was positioned at 157 degrees east between June 2007 and August 2008, and in November 2008 it began operations at 177.9 degrees east; Intelsat documentation listed its position as 178 degrees east. The satellite was decommissioned and moved to a graveyard orbit in July 2012.
