= Intelsat 601 =

Geostationary communications satellite

- Mission type: Communication
- Operator: Intelsat (1991-2007); Europe*Star (2007-2011)
- COSPAR ID: 1991-075A
- SATCAT no.: 21765
- Mission duration: 13 years (planned); 20 years (achieved)

Spacecraft properties
- Bus: HS-389
- Manufacturer: Hughes
- Launch mass: 4,330 kilograms (9,550 lb)

Start of mission
- Launch date: 29 October 1991, 23:08:08 UTC
- Rocket: Ariane 44L V47
- Launch site: Kourou ELA-2

End of mission
- Disposal: Decommissioned
- Deactivated: October 2011

Orbital parameters
- Reference system: Geocentric
- Regime: Geostationary
- Perigee altitude: 35,680 kilometres (22,170 mi)
- Apogee altitude: 35,897 kilometres (22,305 mi)
- Inclination: 0 degrees
- Period: 1436.19 minutes
- Epoch: 4 December 1991

Intelsat 601, previously named Intelsat VI F-1, was a communications satellite operated by Intelsat, and later Europe*Star. Launched in 1991, it was the last of five Intelsat VI satellites to be launched. The Intelsat VI series was constructed by Hughes Aircraft, based on the HS-389 satellite bus.

== History ==
Intelsat 601 was launched at 23:08:08 UTC on 29 October 1991, atop an Ariane 4 carrier rocket in the 44L configuration, flight number V47. The launch took place from ELA-2 at Kourou, and placed Intelsat 601 into a geosynchronous transfer orbit. The satellite raised itself into its final geostationary orbit using two liquid-fuelled R-4D-12 engines, with the satellite arriving in geostationary orbit on 2 November 1991.

Intelsat 601 operated in geostationary orbit with a perigee of 35,680 kilometres (22,170 mi), an apogee of 35,897 kilometres (22,305 mi), and 0 degrees of inclination. The satellite carried 38 IEEE C band and ten IEEE K_{u} band transponders, and had a design life of 13 years and a mass of 4,330 kilograms (9,550 lb).

Upon entering service, Intelsat 601 was positioned at 27.5 degrees west. In October 1997, it was moved to 34.5 degrees west, reaching the new slot on 16 October. Between May and July 2002 it was moved to 32.9 degrees east, and between October and November it was again moved, to 64.25 degrees east, where it would remain until October 2006. Its final operations for Intelsat were conducted at 63.5 degrees east, where it arrived in November 2006. In October 2007 it was transferred to Europe*Star, and relocated to 47.5 degrees East, arriving in November. The satellite was retired from service and placed into a graveyard orbit in October 2011.
