= Telstar 402 =

1994 American telecommunications satellite

- Mission type: Communication
- Operator: AT&T
- COSPAR ID: 1994-058A
- SATCAT no.: 23249
- Mission duration: 12 years (planned)

Spacecraft properties
- Bus: AS-7000
- Manufacturer: Lockheed Martin
- Launch mass: 3,485 kilograms (7,683 lb)
- Dimensions: 4.08 m × 2.22 m × 2.54 m (13.4 ft × 7.3 ft × 8.3 ft)
- Power: 5000 W

Start of mission
- Launch date: 16 December 1994, 00:29:44 UTC
- Rocket: Ariane-42L H10+
- Launch site: Kourou ELA-2

End of mission
- Last contact: September 9, 2004
- Decay date: November 14, 2004

Orbital parameters
- Reference system: Geocentric
- Regime: Geostationary (planned)
- Longitude: 89° W (planned)
- Perigee altitude: 292 kilometres (181 mi)
- Apogee altitude: 19,340 kilometres (12,020 mi)
- Inclination: 7.1°
- Period: 341.8 minutes
- Epoch: September 9, 1994

Telstar 402 was a communications satellite owned by AT&T Corporation.

Telstar 402 was successfully launched into space on September 9, 1994, by means of an Ariane-42L vehicle from the Kourou Space Center, French Guiana. It had a launch mass of 3,775 kg. The satellite was lost shortly after launch due to an explosion that occurred in the propulsion system that was caused by leakage of hot gases.
