= Intelsat 905 =

Geostationary communications satellite

- Mission type: Communications
- Operator: Intelsat
- COSPAR ID: 2002-027A
- SATCAT no.: 27438
- Mission duration: 13 years

Spacecraft properties
- Spacecraft type: SSL-1300HL
- Manufacturer: Space Systems/Loral
- Launch mass: 4,723.0 kg (10,412.4 lb)
- Dry mass: 1,984.0 kg (4,374.0 lb)

Start of mission
- Launch date: June 5, 2002, 06:44 UTC
- Rocket: Ariane 44L H10-3
- Launch site: Kourou ELA-2
- Contractor: Arianespace

Orbital parameters
- Reference system: Geocentric
- Regime: Geostationary
- Longitude: 24.5° west
- Semi-major axis: 42,164.0 kilometres (26,199.5 mi)
- Perigee altitude: 35,780.9 kilometres (22,233.2 mi)
- Apogee altitude: 35,806.5 kilometres (22,249.1 mi)
- Inclination: 4.6°
- Period: 1,436.1 minutes
- Epoch: May 23, 2017

Transponders
- Band: 76 C band and 22 K_{u} band
- Bandwidth: 36 MHz
- Coverage area: Africa, Middle East
- EIRP: 31-54 dBW

Intelsat 905 (or IS-905) is a communications satellite operated by Intelsat.

== Launch ==
Intelsat 905 was launched by an Ariane 4 rocket from Guiana Space Centre, French Guiana, at 06:44 UTC on June 5, 2002.

== Capacity and coverage ==
It will provide voice, video, and internet services to all countries adjoining the Atlantic Ocean through its 72 C band and 22 Ku band transponders after parking over 24.5 degrees west longitude.

== See also ==
- 2002 in spaceflight
