= Intelsat 605 =

Decommissioned geostationary communications satellite

- Mission type: Communication
- Operator: Intelsat
- COSPAR ID: 1991-055A
- SATCAT no.: 21653
- Mission duration: 13 years (planned); 17 1/2 years (achieved)

Spacecraft properties
- Bus: HS-389
- Manufacturer: Hughes
- Launch mass: 4,296 kilograms (9,471 lb)

Start of mission
- Launch date: 14 August 1991, 23:15:13 UTC
- Rocket: Ariane 44L V45
- Launch site: Kourou ELA-2
- Contractor: Arianespace

End of mission
- Disposal: Decommissioned
- Deactivated: January 2009

Orbital parameters
- Reference system: Geocentric
- Regime: Geostationary
- Perigee altitude: 35,756 kilometres (22,218 mi)
- Apogee altitude: 35,818 kilometres (22,256 mi)
- Inclination: 0 degrees
- Period: 1436.11 minutes
- Epoch: 13 September 1991

Intelsat 605, previously named Intelsat VI F-5, was a communications satellite operated by Intelsat. Launched in 1991, it was the fourth of five Intelsat VI satellites to be launched. The Intelsat VI series was constructed by Hughes Aircraft, based on the HS-389 satellite bus.

== History ==
Intelsat 605 was launched at 23:15:13 UTC on 14 August 1991, atop an Ariane 4 44L carrier rocket, flight number V45. The launch took place from ELA-2 at Kourou, and placed Intelsat 605 into a geosynchronous transfer orbit. The satellite raised itself into its final geostationary orbit using two liquid-fuelled R-4D-12 engines, with the satellite arriving in geostationary orbit on 20 August 1991.

Intelsat 605 initially operated in a geostationary orbit with a perigee of 35,756 kilometres (22,218 mi), an apogee of 35,818 kilometres (22,256 mi), and 0 degrees of inclination. The satellite carried 38 IEEE C band and ten IEEE K_{u} band transponders, and had a design life of 13 years and a mass of 4,296 kilograms (9,471 lb).

During late 1991, Intelsat 605 was operated at a longitude of 21.5 degrees west. In July 1992, it was placed at 24.5 degrees west, where it operated until November 1997. It subsequently operated at 27.5 degrees west from December 1997 to March 2003; 32.9 degrees east from April 2003 to October 2004; 77 degrees west from December 2004 to January 2005, and 174 degrees east from April 2005 to January 2009. It was placed into a graveyard orbit and decommissioned in January 2009.
