= Intelsat 802 =

Communications satellite

- Mission type: Communications
- Operator: Intelsat
- COSPAR ID: 1997-031A
- SATCAT no.: 24846
- Mission duration: 14 years

Spacecraft properties
- Spacecraft type: AS-7000
- Manufacturer: Lockheed Martin
- Launch mass: 3,447 kilograms (7,599 lb)

Start of mission
- Launch date: June 25, 1997, 01:07:42 UTC
- Rocket: Ariane-44P H10-3
- Launch site: Kourou ELA-2
- Contractor: Arianespace

End of mission
- Deactivated: October 2010

Orbital parameters
- Reference system: Geocentric
- Regime: Geostationary; Now supersynchronous
- Longitude: 174° W (original); 55.6° W (current)
- Semi-major axis: 427,820 kilometres (265,840 mi)
- Perigee altitude: 362,922 kilometres (225,509 mi)
- Apogee altitude: 365,299 kilometres (226,986 mi)
- Inclination: 4.9 degrees
- Period: 1,467.8 minutes
- Epoch: May 5, 2017

Transponders
- Band: 38 C Band, 6 Ku band
- Coverage area: Europe, Africa, Asia

Intelsat 802 was a communications satellite operated by Intelsat. Launched in 1997 it was operated in geostationary orbit at a longitude of 174 degrees west for around fourteen years.

== Satellite ==
The second of six Intelsat VIII satellites to be launched, Intelsat 802 was built by Lockheed Martin. It was a 3,447-kilogram (7,599 lb) spacecraft. The satellite carried a 2xLEROS-1B apogee motor for propulsion and was equipped with 38 C Band transponders and 6 Ku band transponders, powered by 2 solar cells more batteries. It was designed for a fourteen-year service life.

== Launch ==
The launch of Intelsat 802 made use of an Ariane 4 rocket flying from Guiana Space Centre, Kourou, French Guiana. The launch took place at 01:07 UTC on June 25, 1997, with the spacecraft entering a geosynchronous transfer orbit. Intelsat 802 subsequently fired its apogee motor to achieve geostationary orbit.

== See also ==
- 1997 in spaceflight
