= INSAT-2B =

Indian telecommunications satellite

- Mission type: Telecommunication and meteorological observation
- Operator: INSAT
- COSPAR ID: 1993-048B
- SATCAT no.: 22724
- Mission duration: 11 years

Spacecraft properties
- Manufacturer: ISRO
- Launch mass: 1,906 kilograms (4,202 lb)
- Dry mass: 916 kg
- Power: 1000 watts

Start of mission
- Launch date: 23 July, 1993
- Rocket: Ariane-4
- Launch site: Kourou, French Guiana
- Contractor: Arianespace

End of mission
- Deactivated: 1 July, 2004

Orbital parameters
- Reference system: Geocentric
- Regime: Geostationary
- Longitude: 93.5 degree east

INSAT-2B (The Indian National Satellite system) was the second satellite in the INSAT 2 Series that was successfully launched for telecommunication and meteorological observation. This India satellite was launched on 23 July 1993 from Kourou, French Guiana and Ariane-4 being its launch vehicle. INSAT-2B is placed in the geostationary orbit at a longitude of 93.5 degree East. The satellites also carries a search and rescue(SAR) transponder, a data relay transponder and also high resolution radiometer. This radiometer has a resolution of 2 km (1.2 mi) in the normal visible band and of 8 km (5.0 mi) in the thermal infra red band.

== History ==
The lift off mass of the satellite was around 1,906 kg (4,202 lb) and dry mass of 916 kg with a spacecraft power of 1000 W. The Satellite had an operational lifespan of 11 years. The satellite completed its mission on 1 July 2004 and is out of service since then.

The major components of the satellite includes a VHRR (Very High-resolution Radiometer), DCS (Data Collection system) and SASAR (Satellite Aided and Rescue) system. This VHRR was completely designed & built at ISRO. The VHRR is capable of working in three modes namely full scan, normal scan and sector scan mode. The DCS provides environmental information using data relay transponder from Data collection platforms. SASAR gives us emergency alerts, if any, for the Indian subcontinent.
