= Intelsat 804 =

Geostationary communications satellite

- Mission type: Communications
- Operator: Intelsat
- COSPAR ID: 1997-083A
- SATCAT no.: 25110
- Mission duration: 14 years (planned)

Spacecraft properties
- Spacecraft type: AS-7000
- Manufacturer: Lockheed Martin
- Launch mass: 3,412 kilograms (7,522 lb)

Start of mission
- Launch date: December 22, 1997, 00:16 UTC
- Rocket: Ariane-42L H10-3
- Launch site: Kourou ELA-2
- Contractor: Arianespace

End of mission
- Deactivated: January 14, 2005, 22:32 UTC

Orbital parameters
- Reference system: Geocentric
- Regime: Geostationary; Now supersynchronous
- Longitude: 44° E
- Semi-major axis: 42,169.0 kilometres (26,202.6 mi)
- Perigee altitude: 35,776.2 kilometres (22,230.3 mi)
- Apogee altitude: 35,820.4 kilometres (22,257.8 mi)
- Inclination: 9.7 degrees
- Period: 1,436.3 minutes
- Epoch: May 5, 2017

Transponders
- Band: 38 C Band, 6 Ku band
- Coverage area: Indian Ocean

Intelsat 804 was a communications satellite operated by Intelsat. Launched in 1997 it was operated in geostationary orbit at a longitude of 44 degrees east for around 8 years.

== Satellite ==
The fourth of six Intelsat VIII satellites to be launched, Intelsat 804 was built by Lockheed Martin. It was a 3,412-kilogram (7,522 lb) spacecraft. The satellite carried a 2xLEROS-1B apogee motor for propulsion and was equipped with 38 C Band transponders and 6 Ku band transponders, powered by 2 solar cells more batteries. It was designed for a fourteen-year service life.

== Launch ==
The launch of Intelsat 804 made use of an Ariane 4 rocket flying from Guiana Space Centre, Kourou, French Guiana. The launch took place at 00:116 UTC on December 22, 1997, with the spacecraft entering a geosynchronous transfer orbit. The satellite subsequently fired its apogee motor to achieve geostationary orbit.

== Failure ==
On 14 January 2005 at 22:32 UTC, there was a failure of the power system.

== See also ==
- 1997 in spaceflight
