= Intelsat 902 =

Geostationary communications satellite

- Mission type: Communications
- Operator: Intelsat
- COSPAR ID: 2001-039A
- SATCAT no.: 26900
- Mission duration: 13 years

Spacecraft properties
- Bus: SSL 1300HL
- Manufacturer: Space Systems/Loral
- Launch mass: 4,725.0 kilograms (10,416.8 lb)
- Dry mass: 1,972.0 kilograms (4,347.5 lb)
- Power: 8,6 kW

Start of mission
- Launch date: 30 August 2001, 06:46 UTC
- Rocket: Ariane 44L H10-3
- Launch site: Kourou ELA-2
- Contractor: Arianespace

Orbital parameters
- Reference system: Geocentric
- Regime: Geostationary
- Longitude: 62° E

Intelsat 902 (IS-902) was the second of 9 new Intelsat satellites launched in August 2001 at 62°E. It will provide telecommunications and television broadcast to Europe, Sub-Saharan Africa, Central Asia, the Far East and Australia through its 44 C band and 12 Ku band transponders.

== Specifications ==
- Propulsion: R-4D-15 HiPAT
- Power: 2 deployable solar arrays, batteries
- Perigee: 35,781.2 kilometers (22,233.4 mi)
- Apogee: 35,805.7 kilometers (22,248.6 mi)
- Semimajor axis: 42,164 kilometers (26,199 mi)
- Orbital period: 0.02393 hours
- Orbital inclination: 0.0 degrees
- Transponders: 44 C band and 12 Ku band
- Beacons: 3947.5RHCP, 3948.0RHCP, 3950.0V, 3952.0RHCP, 3952.5RHCP, 11198RHCP, 11452RHCP
