= ABS-7 =

1999–2022 communication satellite

- Mission type: Communications
- Operator: ABS
- COSPAR ID: 1999-046A
- SATCAT no.: 25894
- Mission duration: 15 years (planned)

Spacecraft properties
- Bus: A2100A
- Manufacturer: Lockheed Martin
- Launch mass: 2,800 kg (6,200 lb)
- Dry mass: 1,307 kg (2,881 lb)

Start of mission
- Launch date: 4 September 1999
- Rocket: Ariane 42P
- Launch site: Centre Spatial Guyanais

Orbital parameters
- Reference system: Geocentric orbit
- Regime: Geostationary orbit

Transponders
- Band: 30 Ku-band; 3 Ka-band

ABS-7 was a geostationary communication satellite operated by ABS (formerly known as Asia Broadcast Satellite) which was designed and manufactured by Lockheed Martin on the A2100 platform. It featured 30 Ku-band and 3 Ka-band transponders to serve Afghanistan, the Middle East, and Pakistan operating from 116.1EL.

In May 2010, the satellite was sold to ABS and renamed into ABS-7. Its original name was Koreasat 3. The satellite was de-orbited from the geostationary arc and retired on February 16, 2022.
