= INSAT-2A =

Defunct Indian satellite

- Mission type: Multipurpose communication & meteorology
- Operator: INSAT
- COSPAR ID: 1992-041A
- SATCAT no.: 22027
- Mission duration: 7 Years

Spacecraft properties
- Manufacturer: ISRO
- Launch mass: 1,906 kilograms (4,202 lb)
- Dry mass: 916 kg
- Power: watts

Start of mission
- Launch date: 9 July 1992
- Rocket: Ariane-4
- Launch site: French Guiana
- Contractor: Arianespace

End of mission
- Deactivated: 30 May 2002

Orbital parameters
- Reference system: Geocentric
- Regime: Geostationary
- Longitude: 74 Degree East

INSAT 2A was the first Indian multipurpose satellite. It was built in India and it came into operation in August 1992. The mission of the satellite was meteorology, Satellite based search and rescue, and Multipurpose Communication such as telecommunication, broadcasting of television and for disaster warning. The satellite weighed 1906 kg containing the fuel propellant. The weight of the satellite was 916 when there was no fuel.

== History ==
It is situated in the geostationary satellite at a longitude of 74 degree East. Its payload comprises a Radiometer of very high resolution for observing meteorological changes. This radiometer has a resolution of 2 km in the visible band and resolution of 8 km in the infra-red band. The satellite completed its mission on 30 May 2002, and is not in service since 2002. The mission life of the satellite was of 7 years. It was launched from French Guiana using the Ariane 4 as the Launch vehicle.

In comparison to INSAT 1, this satellite can communicate in a better way, both in terms of quality as well as quantity. INSAT 2A has an advanced power amplifiers for catering communication terminals and was the first second generation satellite to replace the INSAT 1. This satellite will also enable the Indian National Satellite system to cover telecommunication circuits at larger distances.
