= Atlantic Bird =

Series of satellites

Atlantic Bird was a series of satellites operated by Eutelsat over the Atlantic Ocean. In 2012 the series was merged into Eutelsat's main fleet as part of the company's rebranding.

== Satellites ==
Two of the original three satellites replaced the France Telecom Telecom 2 satellites which Eutelsat had acquired in 1999. Five satellites were in operation as of 2006:

- Atlantic Bird 1, operating at 12.5°W
- Atlantic Bird 2, launched in September 2001 and operating at 8°W (Replaced Telecom 2A)
- Atlantic Bird 3, a Spacebus 3000B3, operating at 5°W (Replaced Telecom 2C)
- Atlantic Bird 4, operated at 7°W (Formerly Hot Bird 4, also known as Nilesat 103)
- Atlantic Bird 7, launched in September 2011 and operating at 7°W
