= Cerise (satellite) =

French military reconnaissance satellite

CERISE
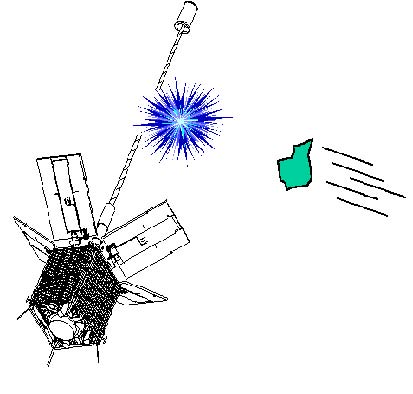
- Illustration of debris colliding with Cerise
- Mission type: Military reconnaissance
- COSPAR ID: 1995-033B
- SATCAT no.: 23606

Spacecraft properties
- Bus: SSTL-70
- Manufacturer: Alcatel Space · Surrey Satellite Technology
- Launch mass: 50 kg (110 lb)
- Dry mass: 50kg
- Dimensions: 0.6 × 0.3 × 0.3 m (1.97 × 0.98 × 0.98 ft)

Start of mission
- Launch date: 7 July 1995, 16:23:34 UTC
- Rocket: Ariane 4 V-75
- Launch site: Guiana Space Centre ELA-2
- Contractor: Arianespace

Orbital parameters
- Reference system: Geocentric
- Regime: Sun-synchronous
- Eccentricity: 0.0005756
- Perigee altitude: 581 km (361 mi)
- Apogee altitude: 589 km (366 mi)
- Inclination: 98.2413°
- Mean motion: 14.94 rev/day
- Epoch: 27 December 2016 12:15:03 UTC

Cerise (French for "cherry") was a French military reconnaissance satellite. Its main purpose was to intercept HF radio signals for French intelligence services. With a mass of 50 kg, it was launched by an Ariane 4 rocket from Kourou in French Guiana at 17:23 UT, 7 July 1995. Cerise's initial orbital parameters were period 98.1 min, apogee 675 km, perigee 666 km, and inclination 98.0 deg.

== History ==
On 24 July 1996 it was hit by space debris from the Ariane 1 rocket that had launched the SPOT 1 satellite. The debris was in a very similar orbit (orbital inclination 98.14°) but oriented in such a way that it was going north where Cerise was going south and vice versa. This created a situation of multiple close passes before the actual collision. The objects collided with a relative velocity of 14.8 km/s, about twice the orbital speed of each, over the Indian Ocean. This was the first verified case of an accidental collision between two artificial objects in space, although there had been others "anomalous events" which were probably also collisions.

The collision tore off a 2.8-2.9 metre (9.2-9.5 foot) portion of Cerise's gravity-gradient stabilization boom, which left the satellite severely damaged and tumbling with a limited attitude control system. Novel magnetic control algorithms were used to re-stabilise the otherwise undamaged microsatellite to regain almost full operational mission capability.

The Naval Space Operations Center detected a minor perturbation in the orbit of the debris of the Ariane rocket.

== See also ==
- 1995 in spaceflight
