= Space Technology Research Vehicle =

STRV
- Mission type: experimental
- Operator: UK Ministry of Defence
- COSPAR ID: 1A: 1994-034B; 1B: 1994-034C; 1C: 2000-072C; 1D: 2000-072D
- SATCAT no.: 1A: 23125; 1B: 23126; 1C: 26610; 1D: 26611

Spacecraft properties
- Manufacturer: DRA
- Launch mass: 1A & 1B: 50 kg (110 lb) each 1C & 1D: 100 kg (220 lb) each

Start of mission
- Launch date: 1A & 1B: 07:07:19, 17 June 1994 (UTC); 1C & 1D:01:07, 16 November 2000 (UTC)
- Rocket: 1A & 1B: Ariane 44LP; 1C & 1D:Ariane 5
- Launch site: Guiana Space Center

Orbital parameters
- Reference system: Geocentric
- Perigee altitude: 1A & 1B: 284 km (176 mi); 1C & 1D: 615 km (382 mi)
- Apogee altitude: 1A & 1B: 35,831 km (22,264 mi); 1C & 1D: 39,269 km (24,401 mi)
- Inclination: 1A & 1B: 7.1° 1C & 1D:6.4°
- Period: 1A & 1B: 633 min 1C & 1D: 708 min

Space Technology Research Vehicle, or STRV, was a series of British microsatellites which operated in elliptical orbits around the Earth. The satellites were built by the Defence Research Agency at Farnborough, for the UK Ministry of Defence.

== Mission ==
The series of four satellites, launched as two pairs, were designed to test new technologies in the harsh radiation environment of a geostationary transfer orbit. Each satellite had an expected 1 year life-time and carries myriad detectors, sensors and other equipment for a variety of organisations including the UK MoD, ESA and the US Department of Defense. The satellites were controlled from the DRA groundstation at Lasham in the UK. Several of the STRV satellites' experiments also recorded proton and electron data as they repeatedly passed through the Van Allen Belts.

== Payloads ==
Two satellites were launched in June 1994 and another two were launched in November 2000, from the space center in French Guiana.

=== STRV 1A & 1B ===
STRV 1A and STRV 1B are cube-shaped micro-satellites each with a mass of 50 kg. They were launched into orbit to test new solar cells and measure static charge on its surfaces.

=== STRV 1C & 1D ===
STRV 1C and STRV 1D are cube-shaped micro-satellite each with a mass of 100 kg and carry test technology devices including lithium ion batteries and a GPS receiver.
