= List of Brazilian satellites =

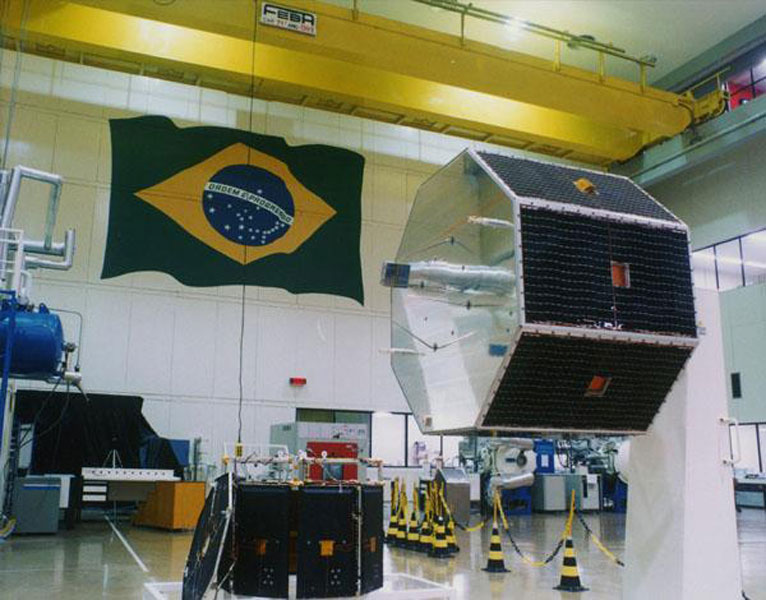
SCD-2 being readied at Inpe

This list covers all satellites developed totally or partially in Brazil. Since Brazil does not currently have orbital launch capability and has historically had to rely on other countries.

== List ==
=== Scientific and remote sensing ===
Key

Destroyed during launch or on the pad. In operation.

Designation	Class	Launch			Deployment			Mission status	Summary
Designation	Class	Date	Site	Vehicle	Date	Orbit	Vehicle	Mission status	Summary
1990s
Dove-OSCAR 17	Cubesat	22 January 1990	(France) Kourou Space Centre	(France) Ariane 40 H10	22 January 1990	Low Earth Orbit	N/A	Operated until 15 March 1998.	Brazil's first privately designed amateur radio satellite.
SCD-1	Satellite	9 February 1993	(United States) Kennedy Space Center	(United States) Pegasus 003/F3	9 February 1993	Low Earth Orbit	N/A	In operation.	First satellite developed by INPE.
SCD-2A	Satellite	2 November 1997	(Brazil) Alcântara Space Center	(Brazil) VLS-1 V1	N/A	N/A	N/A	Destroyed at launch.	Second satellite developed by INPE.
SCD-2	Satellite	23 October 1998	(United States) Cape Canaveral Space Force Station	(United States) Pegasus	23 October 1998	Low Earth Orbit	N/A	In operation.	Third satellite developed by INPE.
CBERS-1	Satellite	14 October 1999	(China) Taiyuan Satellite Launch Center	(China) Long March 4B	14 October 1999	Sun-synchronous orbit	N/A	Decommissioned in 15 September 2003.	First satellite from the program CBERS.
SACI-1	Microsatellite	14 October 1999	(China) Taiyuan Satellite Launch Center	(China) Long March 4B	14 October 1999	Sun-synchronous orbit	N/A	It lost contact shortly after entering orbit.	It aimed to carry out university experiments selected by the Brazilian Academy of Sciences. The programme was terminated after the loss of the second satellite.
SACI-2	Microsatellite	11 December 1999	(Brazil) Alcântara Space Center	(Brazil) VLS-1 V2	N/A	N/A	N/A	Destroyed at launch.	It aimed to carry out university experiments selected by the Brazilian Academy of Sciences. The programme was terminated after the loss of the second satellite.
2000s
CBERS-2	Satellite	21 October 2003	(China) Taiyuan Satellite Launch Center	(China) Long March 4B	21 October 2003	Low Earth Orbit	N/A	Decommissioned in 15 January 2009.	Second satellite from the program CBERS.
SATEC	Microsatellite	25 August 2003	(Brazil) Alcântara Space Center	(Brazil) VLS-1 V3	N/A	N/A	N/A	Destroyed during pre-launch tests on the platform due to the 2003 Alcântara VLS accident.	Developed by INPE.
UNOSAT	Nanosatellite	25 August 2003	(Brazil) Alcântara Space Center	(Brazil) VLS-1 V3	N/A	N/A	N/A	Destroyed during pre-launch tests on the platform due to the 2003 Alcântara VLS accident.	Developed by University North of Paraná.
CBERS-2B	Satellite	19 September 2007	(China) Taiyuan Satellite Launch Center	(China) Long March 4B	19 September 2007	Sun-synchronous orbit	N/A	Decommissioned in April 2010.	Third satellite from the program CBERS.
2010s
CBERS-3	Satellite	9 December 2013	(China) Taiyuan Satellite Launch Center	(China) Long March 4B	N/A	N/A	N/A	Premature re-entry due to rocket failure.	Fourth satellite from the program CBERS.
NanoSatC-Br 1	Nanosatellite	19 June 2014	(Russia) Dombarovsky Air Base	(Ukraine) Dnepr	19 June 2014	Low Earth Orbit	N/A	Retired.	Developed under an agreement between UFSM and INPE.
CBERS-4	Satellite	7 December 2014	(China) Taiyuan Satellite Launch Center	(China) Long March 4B	7 December 2014	Sun-synchronous orbit	N/A	In operation.	Fifth satellite from the program CBERS.
AESP-14	Nanosatellite	10 January 2015	(United States) Cape Canaveral Space Force Station	(United States) Falcon 9 v1.1	5 February 2015	ISS	(Japan) Kibō	Considered inoperative after failing to open an antenna.	Developed by INPE and ITA.
SERPENS	Nanosatellite	18 August 2015	(Japan) Tanegashima Space Center	(Japan) H-IIB	17 September 2015	ISS	(Japan) Kibō	Re-entry on 27 March 2016.	Project created by AEB in partnership with universities.
Tancredo-1	Picosatellite	9 December 2016	(Japan) Tanegashima Space Center	(Japan) H-IIB	16 January 2017	ISS	(Japan) Kibō	Re-entry on 18 October 2017.	Educational project at the Tancredo Neves Municipal School in Ubatuba.
ITASAT-1	Microsatellite	3 December 2018	(United States) Vandenberg Air Force Base	(United States) Falcon 9 Block 5	3 December 2018	Low Earth Orbit	N/A	In orbit (2020). In operation (2025).	Project developed by ITA, AEB and INPE.
CBERS-4A	Satellite	20 December 2019	(China) Taiyuan Satellite Launch Center	(China) Long March 4B	20 December 2019	Sun-synchronous orbit	N/A	In operation (2021).	Sixth satellite from the program CBERS.
FloripaSat-1	Nanosatellite	20 December 2019	(China) Taiyuan Satellite Launch Center	(China) Long March 4B	20 December 2019	Sun-synchronous orbit	N/A	Retired.	Developed by students from UFSC in partnership with AEB.
2020s
Amazônia-1	Satellite	28 February 2022	(India) Satish Dhawan Space Centre	(India) PSLV-C51	28 February 2022	Polar orbit	N/A	In operation (2021).	Developed by INPE and AEB. It is the first satellite developed and built entirely in Brazil.
NanoSatC-Br 2	Nanosatellite	22 March 2021	(Russia) Baikonur Cosmodrome	(Russia) Soyuz-2	22 March 2021	Low Earth Orbit	N/A	Retired.	Built in partnership between INPE and UFSM.
PION-BR1	Picosatellite	13 January 2022	(United States) Cape Canaveral Space Force Station	(United States) Falcon 9 Block 5	13 January 2022	Low Earth Orbit	N/A	Reentry (2024). Satellite failure.	Developed by PION Labs, it is the first Brazilian produced satellite developed by a startup.
Alpha Crux	Picosatellite	1 April 2022	(United States) Cape Canaveral Space Force Station	(United States) Falcon 9 Block 5	1 April 2022	Low Earth orbit	N/A	In orbit (2022).	Developed by University of Brasília, in partnership with the Brazilian Space Agency.
(Finland) Carcará I	Microsatellite	25 May 2022	(United States) Cape Canaveral Space Force Station	(United States) Falcon 9 Block 5	25 May 2022	Low Earth Orbit	N/A	In orbit (2022).	Remote sensing radar satellite of the Brazilian Air Force, part of the Lessonia-1 Project, produced by the Finnish company ICEYE.
(Finland) Carcará II	Microsatellite	25 May 2022	(United States) Cape Canaveral Space Force Station	(United States) Falcon 9 Block 5	25 May 2022	Low Earth Orbit	N/A	In orbit (2022).	Remote sensing radar satellite of the Brazilian Air Force, part of the Lessonia-1 Project, produced by the Finnish company ICEYE.
SPORT	Microsatellite	21 November 2022	(United States) Cape Canaveral Space Force Station	(United States) Falcon 9 Block 5	21 November 2022	Low Earth Orbit	N/A	Reentry in October 2023.	Scintilation Prediction Observations Research Task, project developed in a paterneship between ITA, NASA, INPE and American universities.
VCUB-1	Nanosatelite	15 April 2023	(United States) Vandenberg Air Force Base	(United States) Falcon 9 Block 5	15 April 2023	Low Earth Orbit	N/A	Ended in 31 January 2025.	Developed by the Brazilian joint-venture Visiona (Embraer and Telebrás), for Earth observation and data collection.
(Finland) Carcará III	Microsatellite	16 August 2024	(United States) Vandenberg Air Force Base	(United States) Falcon 9 Block 5	16 August 2024	Low Earth Orbit	N/A	In operation (2025).	Remote sensing.
(Finland) Carcará IV	Microsatellite	16 August 2024	(United States) Vandenberg Air Force Base	(United States) Falcon 9 Block 5	16 August 2024	Low Earth Orbit	N/A	In operation (2025).	Remote sensing.
Floripasat 2a e 2b	CubeSat	22 December 2025	(Brazil) Alcântara Space Center	(South Korea) HANBIT-NANO F1	22 December 2025	Low Earth Orbit	N/A	Destroyed 33 seconds after launch	Group of environmental and data-collection satellites.
Solares S2	CubeSat	22 December 2025	(Brazil) Alcântara Space Center	(South Korea) HANBIT-NANO F1	22 December 2025	Low Earth Orbit	N/A	Destroyed 33 seconds after launch	Group of environmental and data-collection satellites.
PionBR-2	CubeSat	22 December 2025	(Brazil) Alcântara Space Center	(South Korea) HANBIT-NANO F1	22 December 2025	Low Earth Orbit	N/A	Destroyed 33 seconds after launch	Group of environmental and data-collection satellites.
Jussara-K	CubeSat	22 December 2025	(Brazil) Alcântara Space Center	(South Korea) HANBIT-NANO F1	22 December 2025	Low Earth Orbit	N/A	Destroyed 33 seconds after launch	Group of environmental and data-collection satellites.
EduSat	Nanosatelite	12 January 2026	(India) Satish Dhawan Space Center	(India) PSLV C62	12 January 2026	Low Earth Orbit	N/A	Destroyed.	Educational satellite.
Galaxy Explorer	Nanosatelite	12 January 2026	(India) Satish Dhawan Space Center	(India) PSLV C62	12 January 2026	Low Earth Orbit	N/A	Destroyed.	Research and development.
Orbital Temple	Nanosatelite	12 January 2026	(India) Satish Dhawan Space Center	(India) PSLV C62	12 January 2026	Low Earth Orbit	N/A	Destroyed.	Educational satellite.
UaiSat	Nanosatelite	12 January 2026	(India) Satish Dhawan Space Center	(India) PSLV C62	12 January 2026	Low Earth Orbit	N/A	Destroyed.	Educational satellite.
Aldebaran-I	CubeSat	12 January 2026	(India) Satish Dhawan Space Center	(India) PSLV C62	12 January 2026	Low Earth Orbit	N/A	Destroyed.	Developed by Universidade Federal do Maranhão.

==== ProSAME ====
Projects going through the Procedure for Selection and Adoption of Space Missions of the Brazilian Space Agency.

7 December 2023 meeting
Name	Institution	Type
Under admission process
Missão Programa Microgravidade	(Brazil) AEB	Space sciences
NanoMIRAX 2	(Brazil) INPE	Astronomy
SABIA-Mar	(Brazil) INPE / (Argentina) CONAE	Earth observation
Galileo Solar Space Telescope	(Brazil) INPE	Space sciences
Under qualification process
Amazônia-1B	(Brazil) INPE	Earth observation
AQUAE Mission	(Brazil) INPE	Earth observation
BIOMESAT	(Brazil) INPE	Earth observation
Constelação Catarina-Frota A	(Brazil) INPE	Earth observation
CBERS-6	(Brazil) INPE / (China) CAST	Earth observation
EQUARS	(Brazil) INPE	Earth observation
Garatéa-L	(Brazil) Airvantis	Moon orbiter
SelenITA	(Brazil) ITA	Moon orbiter
ITASAT 2	(Brazil) ITA	Space climate
MAPSAR	(Brazil) INPE	Earth observation

=== Telecommunication ===
Brazilian satellites, but produced abroad:

Satellite	Manufacturer	Rocket	Launch date	Status
1980s
Brasilsat A1	(Canada) Spar Aerospace	(France) Ariane V12	8 February 1985	Retired in March 2002.
Brasilsat A2	(Canada) Spar Aerospace	(France) Ariane 3	28 March 1986	Retired in February 2004.
1990s
Brasilsat B1	(United States) Hughes	(France) Ariane V66	10 August 1994	Retired in December 2010.
Brasilsat B2	(United States) Hughes	(France) Ariane V71	28 March 1995	Retired in June 2018
Brasilsat B3	(United States) Hughes	(France) Ariane V105	4 February 1998	Retired in August 2018.
2000s
Brasilsat B4	(United States) Hughes	(France) Ariane V131	17 August 2000	Retired in June 2021
Estrela do Sul	(United States) SSL	(Ukraine) Zenit-3SL	18 January 2004	?
Star One C12	(France) / (Italy) Thales Alenia Space	(France) Ariane	3 February 2005	In operation.
Star One C1	(France) / (Italy) Thales Alenia Space	(France) Ariane #179	14 November 2007	In operation.
Star One C2	(France) Alcatel-Lucent	(France) Ariane 5	18 April 2008	Em operação.
2010s
Star One C3	(United States) Orbital Sciences Corporation	(France) Ariane 5	10 November 2012	In operation (2022).
Star One C4	(United States) SSL	(France) Ariane VA224	15 July 2015	In operation.
Star One D1	(United States) SSL	(France) Ariane	21 December 2016	In operation.
SGDC-1	(France) / (Italy) Thales Alenia Space	(France) Ariane 5	4 May 2017	In operation (2020).
2020s
Star One D2	(United States) SSL	(France) Ariane 5 VA2545	30 July 2021	In operation (2021).

== See also ==
- National Institute for Space Research
- Brazilian Space Agency

== Bibliography ==
- Junior; Tommaselli; Oliveira; Medeiros; Marcato (2011). "Orientação de imagens CBERS-2B usando o modelo rigoroso de colinearidade com dados orbitais" [Orientation of CBERS-2B images using the collinearity rigorous model with orbital data]. Bol. Ciênc. Geod., sex. Artigos (in Brazilian Portuguese). 17 (3). Curitiba: 401–416. Bibcode:2011BoCG...17..401M. doi:10.1590/S1982-21702011000300005. hdl:11449/6681.
- Berquó, Jolan Eduardo; Coelho, Elizabeth Cabral; Martinolli, João Bosco; Corrêa, Cleber Souza (February 2004). Relatório da Investigação do Acidente ocorrido com o VLS-1 VO3, em 22 de agosto de 2003, em Alcântara, Maranhão (PDF) (in Brazilian Portuguese). São José dos Campos. p. 118. Archived (PDF) from the original on 2013-11-08.
