= Star One (satellite operator) =

Brazilian communication satellite company

Embratel Satélites – Star One
- Company type: Subsidiary
- Industry: Communications
- Founded: December 2000; 25 years ago
- Headquarters: Rio de Janeiro, Brazil
- Area served: Latin America; Caribbean; Florida
- Products: Management of satellites, telephony
- Parent: Embratel
- Website: www.starone.com.br Embratel Satélites – Star One

Embratel Star One is a Brazilian communication satellite company. It is a subsidiary of Embratel.

== History ==
Embratel Star One was created in December 2000, as an arm of Embratel in the area of operation and administration of satellites.

== Satellite fleet ==
Embratel Star One own a small fleet of satellites.

- Star One C1 was launched atop an Ariane 5 ECA rocket at 22:06 UTC on 14 November 2007. This launch had previously been delayed from 9 November 2007 due to a problem with the launch vehicle, and then from 12 November 2007 due to a problem with the launch pad. Star One C1 was built by Alcatel Alenia Space based on a Spacebus 3000 B3 satellite bus. It has 28 C-band transponders, 16 Ku-band transponders and one X-band transponder, and weighed about 4,100 kg (9,000 lb) at launch.
- Star One C2, the second spacecraft, was launched at 22:17 UTC on 18 April 2008, also aboard an Ariane 5 ECA.
- Star One C3, the third spacecraft, was launched at 22:05 UTC on 10 November 2012, also aboard an Ariane 5 ECA.

== Satellites ==
Satellite	Manufacturer	Launch Vehicle	Launch Date	COSPAR ID	SATCAT	State
Brasilsat A1	Spar Aerospace / Hughes	Ariane 3	2 September 1985	1985-015B	15561	Retired
Brasilsat A2	Spar Aerospace / Hughes	Ariane 3	28 March 1986	1986-026B	16650	Retired
Brasilsat B1	Hughes	Ariane 44LP	10 August 1994	1994-049A	23199	Retired
Brasilsat B2	Hughes	Ariane 44LP H10+	29 March 1995	1995-016A	23536	Retired
Brasilsat B3	Hughes	Ariane 44LP	22 January 1998	1998-006A	25152	inclined orbit
Brasilsat B4	Hughes	Ariane 44LP	17 August 2000	2000-046A	26469	Retired
Star One C1	Alcatel Alenia Space	Ariane 5 ECA	31 August 2007	2007-056A	32293	Active
Star One C2	Alcatel Alenia Space	Ariane 5 ECA	18 April 2008	2008-018B	32768	Active
Star One C3	Orbital Sciences Corporation	Ariane 5 ECA	10 November 2012	2012-062A	38991	Active
Star One C12	Alcatel Alenia Space	Proton-M	3 February 2005	2005-003A	28526	Active
Star One C4	Space Systems/Loral	Ariane 5 ECA	15 July 2015	2015-034A	40733	Active
Star One D1	Space Systems/Loral	Ariane 5 ECA	21 December 2016	2016-082B	41904	Active
Star One D2	Space Systems/Loral	Ariane 5 ECA	30 July 2021	2021-069A	49056	Active
