= Brasilsat A2 =

Brazilian geostationary communication satellite

Brasilsat A2 / SBTS 2
- Mission type: Telecommunications
- Operator: Embratel (1986-2000); Star One (2000-2004)
- COSPAR ID: 1986-026B
- SATCAT no.: 16650
- Mission duration: 18 years

Spacecraft properties
- Bus: HS-376
- Manufacturer: Spar Aerospace / Hughes
- Launch mass: 1,194.8 kilograms (2,634 lb)

Start of mission
- Launch date: March 28, 1986 at 23:30 UTC
- Rocket: Ariane 3
- Launch site: Kourou ELA-2
- Contractor: Arianespace

End of mission
- Deactivated: February 2004

Orbital parameters
- Reference system: Geocentric
- Regime: Geostationary
- Longitude: (first position): 70° W (current position): 153.6° W
- Semi-major axis: 42,342.0 kilometres (26,310.1 mi)
- Perigee altitude: 35,947.7 kilometres (22,336.9 mi)
- Apogee altitude: 35,995.7 kilometres (22,366.7 mi)
- Inclination: 14.8 degrees
- Period: 1,445.2 minutes
- Epoch: 20 April 2017

Transponders
- Band: 24 IEEE C-band
- Coverage area: Brazil, South America

Brasilsat A2 was a Brazilian geostationary communication satellite belonging to the Brasilsat family. It was built by Spar Aerospace in partnership with Hughes. For most of its useful life it was located in the orbital position of 70 degrees west longitude and was operated by Star One, a subsidiary company of Embratel. The satellite was based on the platform HS-376 and its life expectancy was 8 years. The same was out of commission in February 2004 and was transferred to the graveyard orbit.

== Model ==
The satellite had the shape of a cylinder, where on its top was a directional antenna that opened after the launching of the satellite, had the rotation stabilized of 50 to 55 rpm, its movers used like propellant 136 kilograms of hydrazine and was fed by solar cells that supplied 982 watts at the beginning of its operation phase, using two NiCd batteries as power reserves. It carried 24 C-band transmitters with 6 spare transmitters. They provided an Effective Isotropically Radiated Power (EIRP) effective incident radiation power> 34 dBW for most of the Brazilian territory.

== History ==
In the 1980s, Brazil needed its own satellites to exempt foreigners. As a result of this effort, the Brazilian company Embratel contracted in August 1982 the Canadian Spar Aerospace, Ltd., in partnership with American Hughes, to build its series of "Brasilsat A" satellites, the series consisted of two satellites, the Brasilsat-A1 and the Brasilsat A2. Built by Spar Aerospace, which received US$ 125 million to build under license from Hughes, the two Brazilian satellites model HS-376.

The satellites initially received the name of Brasilsat 1 and 2 and formed the beginning of the Brazilian Telecommunications Satellite System - SBTS. Subsequently, with the launch of the second generation of satellites, they were renamed Brasilsat-A1 and A2, and were replaced by the satellites Brasilsat B1 and Brasilsat B2.

The Brasilsat A2 satellite was the second Brazilian satellite owned by the former state-owned Embratel, which was privatized on March 28, 1986, by a 2/3 Ariane rocket at Kourou's launch base in French Guiana. This satellite was equal to Brasilsat A1. It had a mass at the launch of 1,243 kg, Perigee of 35,778 km, Apogee of 35,794 km and a slope of 0.0 degrees. During its commercial life, it was parked at 70 degrees west.

Its contractual life span was 8 years, but the satellite continued to be controlled until the end of 2004, with almost 18 years of life. Brasilsat A2 was operated directly by Embratel until the end of 2000, when Star One was created a subsidiary of Embratel, which was used to manage Embratel's former fleet of satellites. After the satellite was launched in March 1986, it was placed in the orbital position of 70 degrees west longitude. In 1994 it was transferred to 65 degrees west, where it remained until the month of June 1995, it was moved in August 1995 to 92 degrees west, where it remained until January 2001, it was transferred in March 2001 to 63 degrees west in sloping orbit, the Brasilsat A2 remained in this position until February 2004 when it left service and was sent to the graveyard orbit.

Its replacement in the orbital position of 70 degrees west to continue with the telecommunications transmissions, was the satellite Brasilsat B1, that was released in 1994.

== Release ==
The satellite was successfully launched into space on March 28, 1986, at 23:30 UTC, by means of an Ariane 3 vehicle launched from the Space launching base of the Guiana Space Center in French Guiana along with the Satellite GStar 2. It had a launch mass of 1,140 kg.

== Capacity and coverage ==
The Brasilsat A2 was equipped with 24 transponders in C-band (plus 6 reserve) to provide telecommunications services to Brazil and South America.
