= Hispasat 30W-6 =

Spanish communications satellite

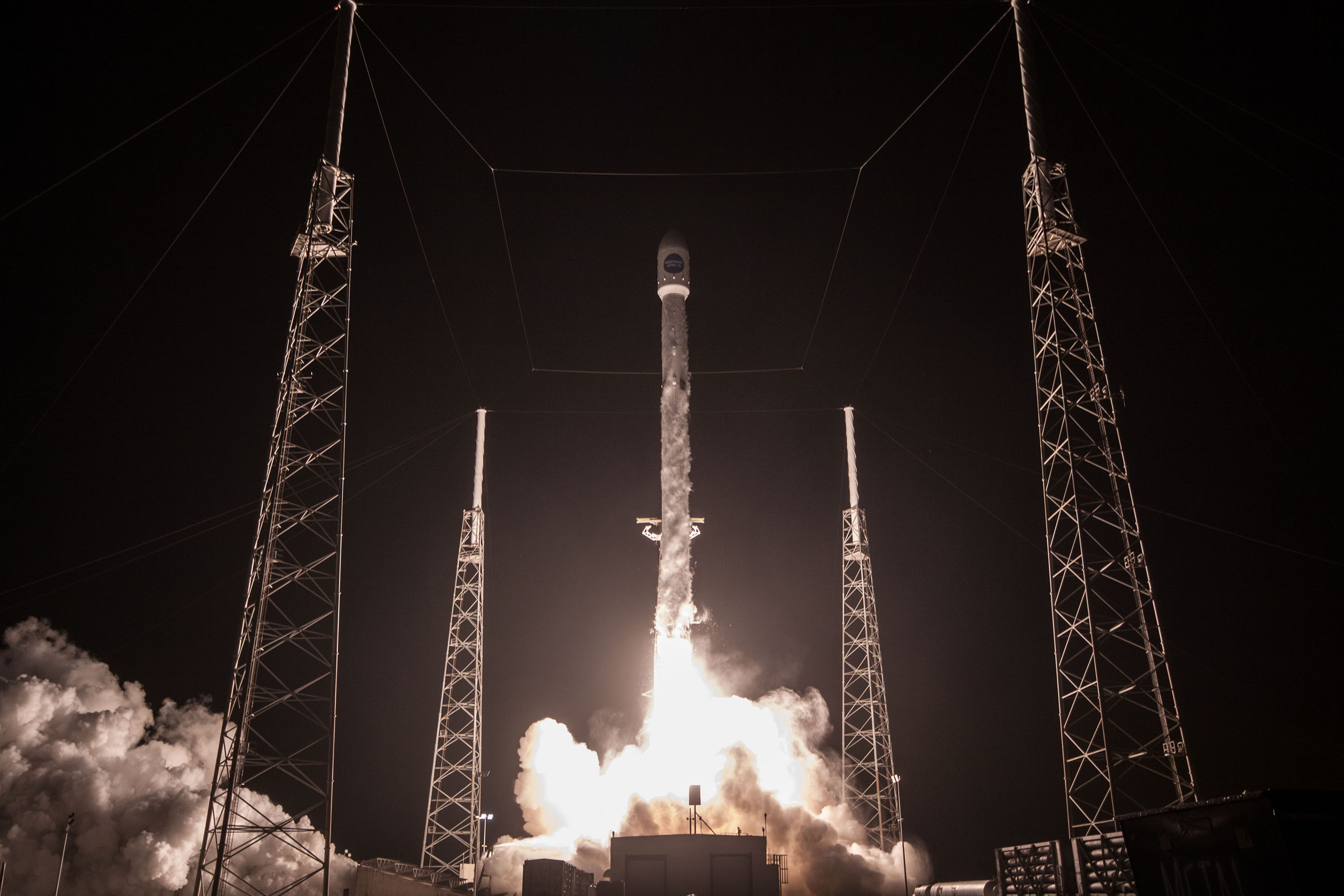
- Launch of Hispasat 30W-6 aboard Falcon 9
- Names: Hispasat 1F
- Mission type: Communications satellite
- Operator: Hispasat
- COSPAR ID: 2018-023A
- SATCAT no.: 43228
- Website: www.hispasat.com/en/satellite-fleet/hispasat-30w-6
- Mission duration: ≈15 years (planned)

Spacecraft properties
- Bus: SSL 1300
- Manufacturer: SSL
- Launch mass: 6,092 kg
- Power: 11.5 kW

Start of mission
- Launch date: 05:33, March 6, 2018 (UTC) UTC
- Rocket: Falcon 9 FT
- Launch site: Cape Canaveral Air Force Station
- Contractor: SpaceX

Orbital parameters
- Reference system: Geocentric
- Regime: Geostationary
- Inclination: 30° W

Transponders
- Band: Ku band C band Ka band

Hispasat 30W-6 (formerly Hispasat 1F) is a Spanish communications satellite by Hispasat that launched on a Falcon 9 on March 6, 2018. It is replacing Hispasat 1D at 30° West longitude and will provide service for television, broadband, corporate networks and other telecommunications applications. The satellite features 4 × SPT-100 plasma propulsion engines.

This mission also carried a small (90 kg) technology demonstration satellite called Payload Orbital Delivery System Satellite (PODSat), which was deployed from its mothership when still in a sub-geostationary transfer orbit.

== See also ==
- Hispasat 36W-1
