= Amazonas 5 =

Spanish communications satellite

- Names: Amazonas 4B
- Mission type: Communications
- Operator: Hispasat
- COSPAR ID: 2017-053A
- SATCAT no.: 42934
- Website: Amazonas 5
- Mission duration: 15 years (planned); 7 years, 7 months, 12 days (elapsed)

Spacecraft properties
- Bus: SSL 1300
- Manufacturer: SSL
- Launch mass: 5900kg
- Power: 11.5kW

Start of mission
- Launch date: September 11, 2017
- Rocket: Proton-M Breeze M
- Launch site: Baikonur Cosmodrome Site 200
- Contractor: ILS

Orbital parameters
- Reference system: Geocentric
- Regime: Geostationary
- Longitude: 61°W
- Semi-major axis: 42,165 km (26,200 mi)
- Periapsis altitude: 37,780 km (23,480 mi)
- Apoapsis altitude: 35,808 km (22,250 mi)
- Inclination: 0.0°
- Period: 1,436 min (1 day 36 min)

Transponders
- Band: 34 Ka band spot beams, 24 Ku band transponders
- Coverage area: Latin America (incl. Brazil)

The Amazonas 5 is a Spanish commercial communications satellite developed by SSL and operated by Hispasat. Launched on September 11, 2017, it has an expected service life of 15 years. Its orbit allows it to cover all of South America, allowing for broadband and broadcast services. It replaces the Amazonas 4A and 4B satellites, the former of which experienced a performance loss and the latter which was cancelled.

== Design ==
=== Satellite bus ===
The satellite is based on the SSL 1300, a satellite bus produced by SSL. It has a launch mass of 5,900 kg (13,000 lb) and has two deployable solar panels.

=== Propulsion ===
The satellite uses a chemical propulsion system for orbit raising with the main engine providing a force between 450 and 490 N and several altitude control thrusters. Although the SSL 1300 spacecraft bus can be equipped with an electric propulsion system, it is unknown if Amazonas 5 comes with it.

=== Communications ===
The satellite's communication system is its main payload. It consists of 24 Ku band transponders for its South America beam and 34 Ka band spot beams for its Brazil beam. It can provide broadband and television services and can deploy 3G, LTE, and 5G networks.

== Launch ==
Amazonas 5 launched from Baikonur Cosmodrome Site 200, Kazakhstan, on September 11, 2017, on board a Proton-M Breeze M rocket. The launch was initially slated to happen on 9 September instead but the Proton rocket's arrival from Moscow was delayed.

It was launched to a geostationary orbit with a periapsis of 35,780.1 km (22,232.7 mi), an apoapsis of 35,808.7 km (22,250.5 mi), and orbital inclination of 0.0°. It is placed at a longitude of 61° W in order to serve South America. It would provide internet connectivity to around 500,000 people in the region, and opens 500 new television channels.

== See also ==
- Hispasat
