= Star One C4 =

Brazilian communications satellite

- Mission type: Communications
- Operator: Embratel
- COSPAR ID: 2015-034B
- SATCAT no.: 40733
- Website: https://www.embratel.com.br/
- Mission duration: 15 years (planned); 9 years, 8 months and 11 days (in progress)

Spacecraft properties
- Spacecraft: Star One C4
- Bus: SSL 1300E
- Manufacturer: Space Systems/Loral
- Launch mass: 5,635 kg (12,423 lb)
- Dimensions: 5.10 x 2.35 x 2.20 m
- Power: 15.6 kW

Start of mission
- Launch date: 15 July 2015, 21:05 UTC
- Rocket: Ariane 5 ECA (VA224)
- Launch site: Centre Spatial Guyanais, ELA-3
- Contractor: Arianespace

Orbital parameters
- Reference system: Geocentric orbit
- Regime: Geostationary orbit
- Longitude: 70.0° West

Transponders
- Band: 48 Ku-band transponders
- Coverage area: Brazil, Central America, Latin America

Star One C4 is a Brazilian communications satellite. It was launched on 15 July 2015, 21:05 UTC by an Ariane 5 ECA launch vehicle, as part of a dual-payload launch with MSG-4. It was built by Space Systems/Loral, based on the SSL 1300E bus satellite. It will be operated by Star One, a subsidiary of Embratel.

== History ==
The contract for the construction of Star One C4 was made in the year 2012, the company responsible was Space Systems/Loral, the date of completion of its construction and official launch occurred in July 2015. The launch date was confirmed by Arianespace on 23 June 2015. And the launching would take place on 8 July 2015. On 3 July 2015, the launcher announced the postponement of the launch for 15 July 2021, due additional checks.

== Capacity and coverage ==
The Star One C4 is equipped with 48 Ku-band transponders (equivalent to 36 MHz) it covers almost the entire Ku-band, between 10.075 GHz and 12.2 GHz and must release some of the Star One C2 satellite transponders to be used in Mexico coverage (the Star One C2 has 14 transponders of 36 MHz and two of 72 MHz). Ensuring the coverage of the entire national territory and ensuring the expansion of service to the west of South America and Central America, besides Mexico and the contiguous United States. The satellite has a power of 15.6 kW and has a park of 24 to 30 million satellite dishes aimed.

== See also ==
- Star One (satellite operator)
- Star One C1
- Star One D1
