= Hispasat 1C =

Hispasat 1C Hispasat 30W-3 Hispasat 84W-1
- Mission type: Communication
- Operator: Hispasat
- COSPAR ID: 2000-007A
- SATCAT no.: 26071
- Mission duration: 17 years

Spacecraft properties
- Bus: Spacebus-3000B2
- Manufacturer: Alcatel Space
- Launch mass: 3,113 kilograms (6,863 lb)

Start of mission
- Launch date: 3 February 2000
- Rocket: Atlas IIAS
- Launch site: Cape Canaveral SLC-36B
- Contractor: ILS

End of mission
- Disposal: Graveyard orbit
- Deactivated: 2 June 2017

Orbital parameters
- Reference system: Geocentric
- Regime: Geostationary
- Longitude: 30° West; 84° West

Hispasat 1C, also known as Hispasat 30W-3 and Hispasat 84W-1, was a Spanish communications satellite which was operated by Hispasat. It was constructed by Alcatel Space and is based on the Spacebus-3000B2 satellite bus. Launch occurred on 3 February 2000, at 23:30. The launch was contracted by ILS, and used an Atlas IIAS carrier rocket flying from SLC-36B at Cape Canaveral.

It had a mass of 3,113 kilograms (6,863 lb), and an expected service life of 15 years.

Following its launch and on-orbit testing, it was placed in geostationary orbit at 30° West, from where it provided communications services to Europe and the Americas.

In 2014, after an agreement between Hispasat and Star One, the satellite was relocated at 84º West and renamed as Hispasat 84W-1.

Finally, on June 2, 2017, the satellite was reorbited to a graveyard orbit, having had a service life of 17 years.
