= Star One D1 =

- Names: Hispasat 84W-2; H84W-2
- Mission type: Communications
- Operator: Embratel
- COSPAR ID: 2016-082B
- SATCAT no.: 41904
- Website: https://www.embratel.com.br/
- Mission duration: 15 years (planned); 8 years, 3 months and 5 days (in progress)

Spacecraft properties
- Spacecraft: Star One D1
- Bus: SSL 1300E
- Manufacturer: Space Systems/Loral
- Launch mass: 6,443 kg (14,204 lb)
- Power: 16 kW

Start of mission
- Launch date: 21 December 2016, 20:30 UTC
- Rocket: Ariane 5 ECA
- Launch site: Centre Spatial Guyanais, ELA-3
- Contractor: Arianespace

Orbital parameters
- Reference system: Geocentric orbit
- Regime: Geostationary orbit
- Longitude: 84° West

Transponders
- Band: 70 transponders: 28 C-band; 24 Ku-band; 18 Ka-band
- Coverage area: Brazil, Latin America

Star One D1 is a communications satellite operated by Embratel Star One with headquarters in Rio de Janeiro, Brazil. It was built by Space Systems/Loral (SSL) based on the SSL 1300 satellite bus. The satellite was successfully launched into space on 21 December 2016 at 20:30 UTC with an Ariane 5 ECA launch vehicle from the Centre Spatial Guyanais in French Guiana, together with the JCSAT-15. It had a launch mass of 6,340 kg (13,980 lb).

== Coverage ==
Star One D1 is equipped with 28 C-band transponders, 24 Ku-band transponders, and 18 Ka-Band transponders to meet the data, audio, video, and Internet demands of corporate and enterprise customers in Brazil, and Latin America.

In addition, the Star One D1 satellite is capable of being used by large companies and government institutions. The satellite is capable of receiving and transmitting television, radio, telephony, internet, and other data signals for entertainment, telemedicine, tele-education and business applications, necessary for the interconnection of the Latin Americans countries and essential for the most distant communities.

== See also ==
- Star One (satellite operator)
- Star One C2
- Star One C3
- Star One C12
