= Eutelsat 21B =

French communications satellite

- Names: Eutelsat W6A (pre-launch); Eutelsat 21B (2012–present)
- Mission type: Communication
- Operator: Eutelsat
- COSPAR ID: 2012-062B
- SATCAT no.: 38992
- Website: www.eutelsat.com/en/satellites/the-fleet/EUTELSAT-21B.html
- Mission duration: 15 years

Spacecraft properties
- Bus: Spacebus 4000C3
- Manufacturer: Thales Alenia Space
- Launch mass: 5,012 kilograms (11,050 lb)

Start of mission
- Launch date: 10 November 2012, 21:05:07 UTC
- Rocket: Ariane 5ECA
- Launch site: Kourou ELA-3
- Contractor: Arianespace

Orbital parameters
- Reference system: Geocentric
- Regime: Geostationary
- Longitude: 21.5° East (2012–present)

Transponders
- Band: 40 Ku-band

Eutelsat 21B, previously known as Eutelsat W6A, is a French communications satellite. Operated by Eutelsat, it provides direct to home broadcasting services from geostationary orbit at a longitude of 21.5 degrees east. It replaced the Eutelsat 21A spacecraft which was launched in 1999.

Eutelsat 21B was constructed by Thales Alenia Space, and is based on the Spacebus-4000C3 satellite bus. It had a mass at launch of 5,012 kilograms (11,050 lb) and is expected to operate for at least 15 years. The satellite carries 40 Ku-band transponders, which are used to broadcast satellite television and radio to Europe, North Africa, Central Asia and the Middle East.

Eutelsat 21B was originally ordered as Eutelsat W6A, as part of the W Series of satellites - the satellite it was to replace was at the time named Eutelsat W6. In 2012, several months before its scheduled launch, W6A was renamed Eutelsat 21B. Its launch was conducted by Arianespace using an Ariane 5ECA carrier rocket, as part of a dual launch with the Brazilian Star One C3 satellite. The launch took place from ELA-3 at Kourou, French Guiana, at 21:05:07 UTC on 10 November 2012. The spacecraft was deployed into geosynchronous transfer orbit, raising itself to its operational geostationary orbit by means of its S400 apogee motor.
