= Hispasat 1D =

Communications satellite

Hispasat 30W-4
- Names: Hispasat 1D
- Operator: Hispasat
- COSPAR ID: 2002-044A
- SATCAT no.: 27528

Spacecraft properties
- Bus: Spacebus-3000B2
- Manufacturer: Alcatel Space
- Launch mass: 3,250 kg
- Dry mass: 1,345 kg

Start of mission
- Launch date: 18/09/2002
- Rocket: Atlas IIAS
- Launch site: Air Force Eastern Test Range (AFETR)

Orbital parameters
- Semi-major axis: 42,164 km
- Periapsis altitude: 35,773.9 km
- Apoapsis altitude: 35,813.6 km
- Inclination: 2.5°
- Period: 1,436.1 minutes

The Hispasat 1D, since 2016 called Hispasat 30W-4 is a Spanish communications satellite launched in 2002 operated by Hispasat. Together with the Hispasat 1C it formed a constellation in order to strengthen communication ties between the American continent (particularly South America) and the Iberian Peninsula for both governmental and private uses.

The end of the service life of the constellation was scheduled for 2017 (after more than 15 years in active) however as of 2022 the Hispasat 1D is still active.

== Body ==
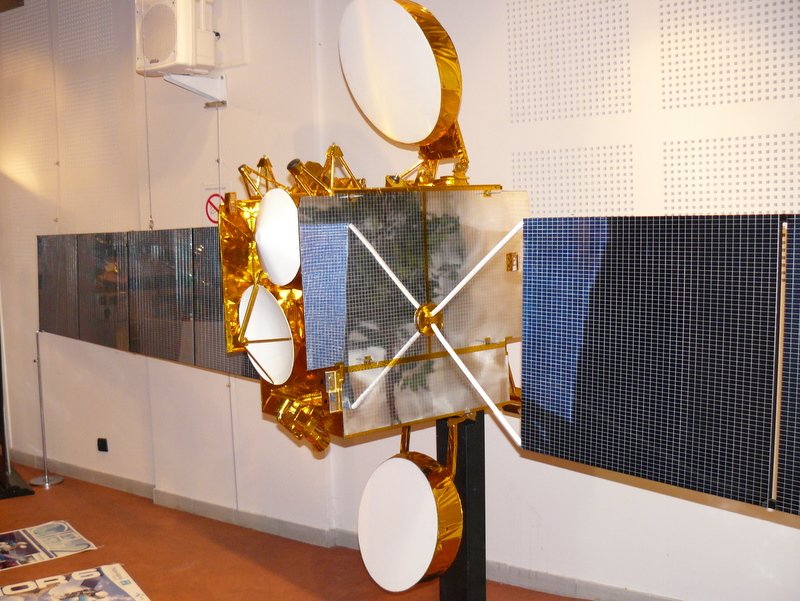
Mock-up of the Eutelsat 33C, a similar satellite build over the Spacebus-3000B2.

The Hispasat 1D was built by Alcatel Space. It is based in the Spacebus-3000B2 bus. The satellite has a dry mass of 1,345 kg (increased to 3,250 kg at launch). It is shaped as a rectangular prism whose lateral faces allocate four Silicon retractable solar panels capable of providing 7 kW (end of life) directly to the two sets of regulated power supplies. When fully deployed it has a RCS of 17.6011 m^{2}.

The satellite is 3-axis stabilized thanks to a set of 4 FDIR reaction wheels.

=== Propulsion ===
The main propulsion for the satellite is provided by a liquid propelled S400-12 rocket engine. It was developed by ArianeGroup (former Airbus DS). It uses monomethylhydrazine and mixed oxides of nitrogen as fuel. It develops a thrust between 340 N and 440 N.

Additionally, the satellite also contains 14 secondary bipropellant S10-18 engines for ABM and aspect control. They use Dinitrogen tetroxide and monomethylhydrazine and are capable of developing up t0 10N of thrust.

The fuel is allocated on two independent OST 22/4 surface-tension fuel tanks.

=== Communications module ===
The satellite is equipped with three antennas, 28 Ku-band transponders and several X-band transponders. It is intended to strengthen communications between the American continent Spain for government, commercial and military use. Particularly offering TV coverage from international channels to South America.

== Launch ==
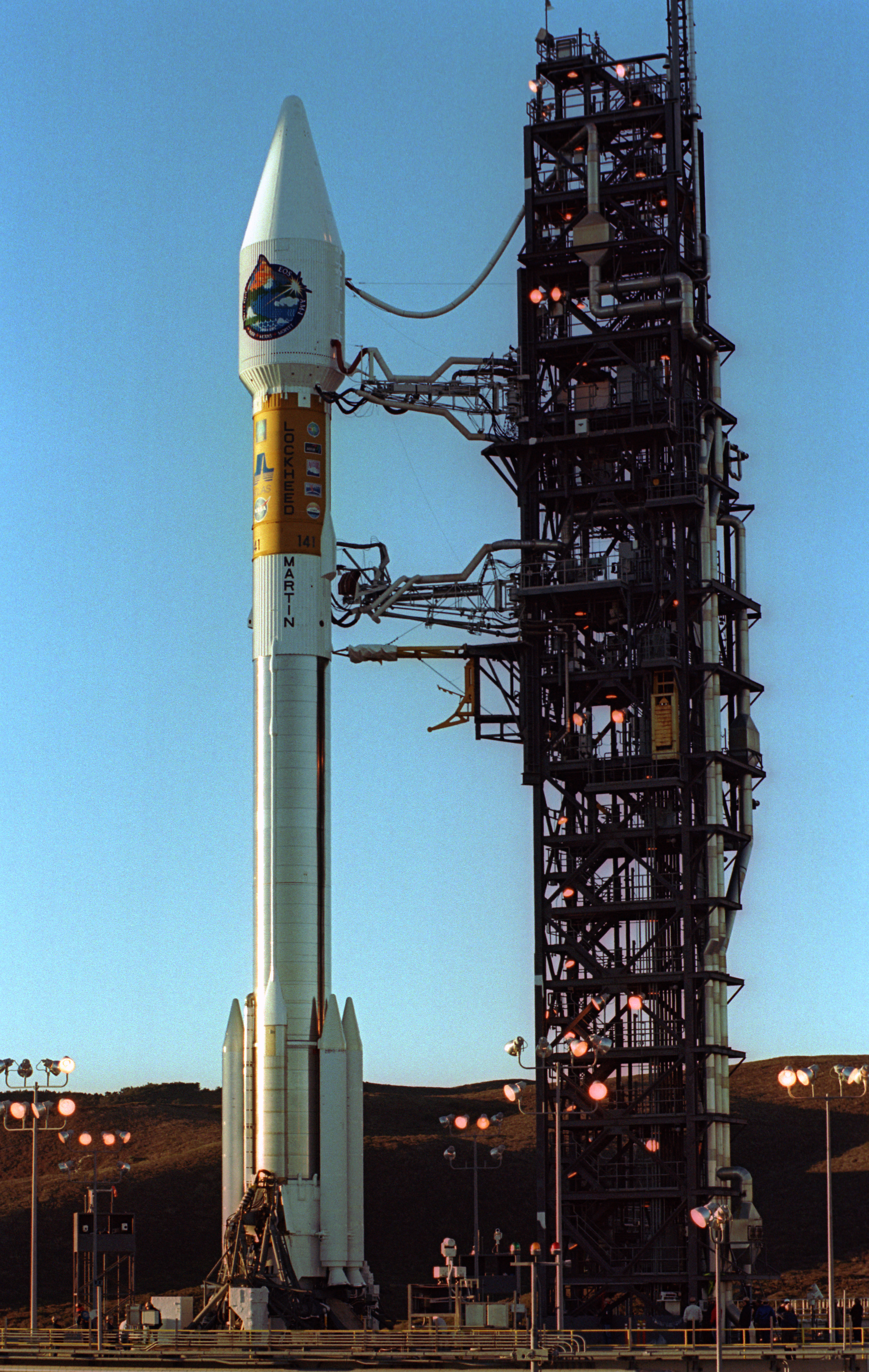
An Atlas IIAS rocket.

The satellite was launched the 18th of September 2002 at 18:00 on board an Atlas IIAS rocket from Space Launch Complex 36A in Cape Canaveral Space Force Station under the direction of Space Launch Delta 45. It was successfully put into a geostationary orbit 30º W with an apogee of 35,813.6 km, a perigee of 35,773.9 km, a semi-major axis of 42,164 km, an inclination of 2.5º and an orbital period of 1,436.1 minutes.

During its service life it is being monitored from Hispasat's Satellite Control Centre in Arganda del Rey (Madrid).
