= Hispasat 1A =

Spanish communications satellite

- Mission type: Communications satellite
- Operator: Hispasat
- COSPAR ID: 1992-060A
- SATCAT no.: 22116
- Mission duration: 10 years

Spacecraft properties
- Bus: Eurostar E2000
- Manufacturer: Matra Marconi Space
- Launch mass: 2,194 kg
- BOL mass: 1,325 kg
- Dry mass: 1,100 kg
- Payload mass: 280 kg
- Dimensions: 1.7 x 1.9 x 2.1 m (22.02 m solar array span)
- Power: 3,790 W

Start of mission
- Launch date: September 10, 1992
- Rocket: Ariane 44LP
- Launch site: Guiana Space Centre
- Contractor: Arianespace

End of mission
- Disposal: graveyard orbit

Orbital parameters
- Semi-major axis: 42,433 km
- Periapsis altitude: 36,055.2 km
- Apoapsis altitude: 36,070.7 km
- Inclination: 13.2 °
- Period: 1,449.9 minutes

Payload
- (12+6) Ku-band (8-55 W, 4-110 W) transponders, (3+1) X-band (110 W) transponders

The Hispasat 1A was the first communications satellite operated by the Spanish company Hispasat. The satellite covered communications over the Atlantic Ocean for both civilian and military customers. Together with the later Hispasat 1B it formed the first European constellation operating over the New World. Its service life ended in 2003.

== Body ==
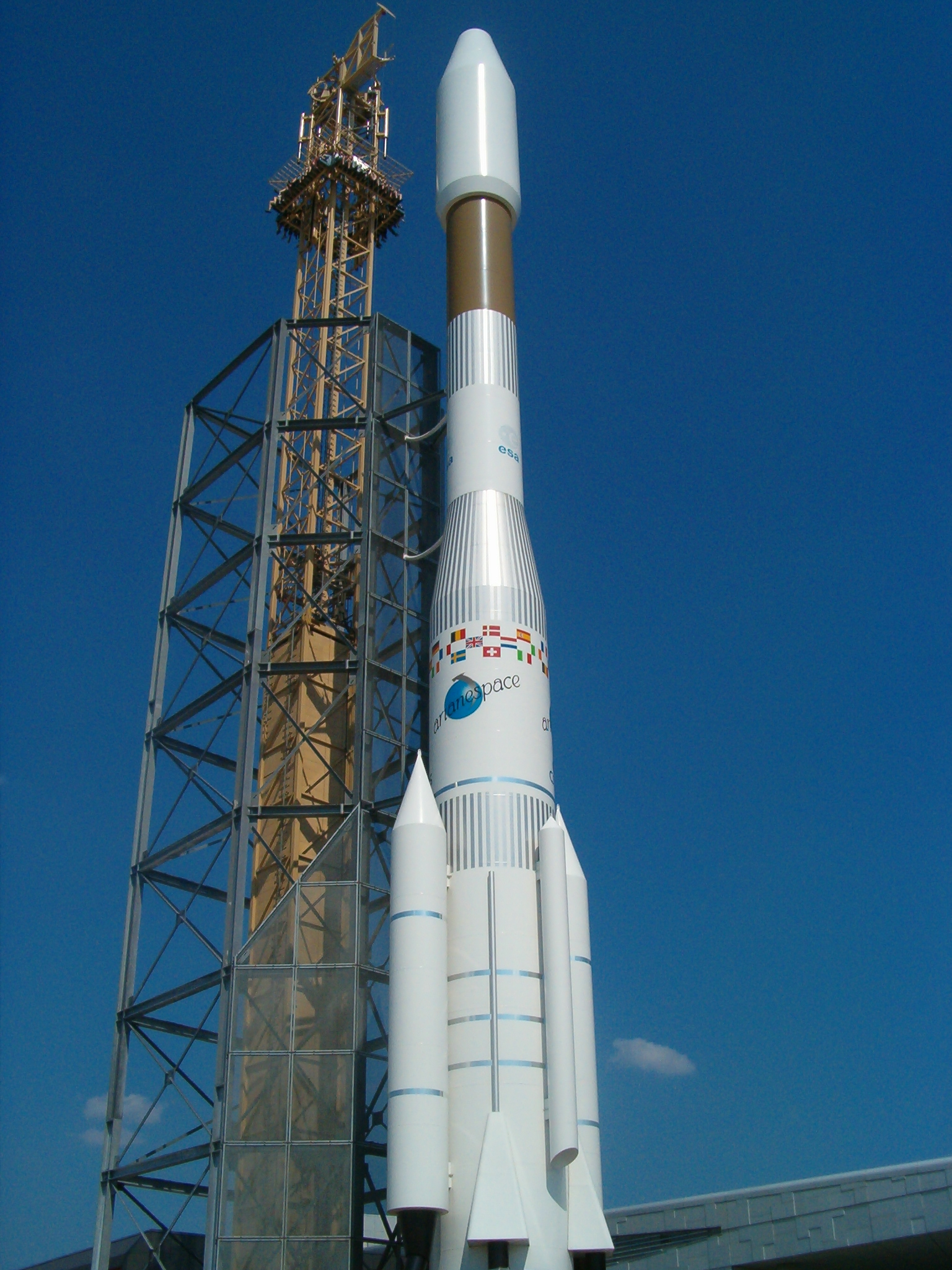
An Ariane 44LP rocket.

The body of the Hispasat 1A was based on the Eurostar E2000 bus. It consisted on a box shaped metal casing (1.7 x 1.9 x 2.21 meters) with retractable solar panels on the lateral faces (when extended measured 22.02 m) and space for the communications module on the upper and lower faces. It was built by British Aerospace and Matra Marconi Space (now part of Airbus Defence and Space). It had a RCS of 7.143 m^{2}.

The satellite weighed 2,194 kg at launch and had a dry weight of 1,325 kg. It was 3 axis stabilized.

=== Propulsion ===
Its main engine was a R-4D-11 (originally developed for use in the Apollo program by Marquardt Corporation). This unit was manufactured by Aerojet Rocketdyne and was capable of developing 490 N of thrust in vacuum. It weighed 3.76 kg.

Additionally, the satellite carried 12 bypropellant (N_{2}O_{4}-MMH) engines with 10 N of thrust each for attitude control and auxiliary maneuvers.

=== Electrical Power Subsystem ===
The satellite had 3,790 W of electric power. Its voltage was 42,5 V. it had solar panels and batteries especially design to provide power twice a year, when the satellite was deprived of sunlight for 80 minutes due to solar eclipses.

=== Communications module ===
The satellite offered both military and civilian communication channels for its customers. The module consisted in 15 active transponders divided between the upper, containing the high gain circularly polarized L antenna and lower (containing a set of low gain antennas) faces of the prism. As a whole, it weighed 280 kg.

For governments and the military it offered three X-band of 110 W each and TWTA amplified (compatible with NATO Standards) with one spare. The bandwidth was 27 MHz and it had a maximum effective isotropic radiated power of 58 dB. In addition its uplink speeds were 12.1-12.5 GHz and 17.3-17.7 GHz downlink.

For the civilian market, it had twelve Ku-band (8 at 55 W, 4 at 110 W) with six spares. They were mostly used for TV coverage.

==== Antenna Failure ====
The 18 December 1997 the X-band antenna suffered a catastrophic failure and ceased functioning. This was later attributed to defects during production and made Matra Marconi Space choose Aérospatiale when building Hispasat 1B's antenna.

== Launch ==
The satellite was successfully launched 10 September 1992 at 23:04 hours by Arianespace on board an Ariane-44LP from the Guiana Space Center along with the American satellite SATCOM C3.

Its orbit was geostationary (GEO) 30º West, around 36,000 km high (36,055.2 km of perigee and 36,070.7 km of apogee) with 13.2º of inclination, a period of 1,449.9 minutes and a semi-major axis of 42,433 km. The 3 September 2001 the satellite was relocated to 29.99º W with an orbital decay of 0.013º W per day.

During its service life it was monitored from Hispasat's headquarters in Arganda del Rey and Rio de Janeiro. Its operating life officially ended in July 2003 when the satellite was definitely moved to a graveyard orbit 7º W and since then it has been drifting 3.458º a day.

== Service life ==
During its ten year service life, the Hispasat 1A accomplished a series of milestones for the aerospace industry of Spain such as:

- Although its service life officially begin in 1993, on 12 October 1992, it performed its first mission during the closure ceremony of the Seville Expo '92.
- On 5 December 1992, Retevisión began its test broadcasts with the transmission of the OTI Festival 1992 held in Valencia through a direct broadcast satellite (DBS) channel.
- It was the first private satellite to be contracted by the Spanish Armed Forces during their deployment in the Balkans.
- It was responsible for the creation of five new television channels in Spain and two in Latin America. Particularly, it allowed the broadcasting of Televisión Española (TVE) in Mexico and Canal América in Spain, after it was negotiated at the 1st Ibero-American Summit in Guadalajara (Mexico).

== See also ==
- Hispasat 1B
