= Galileo Solar Space Telescope =

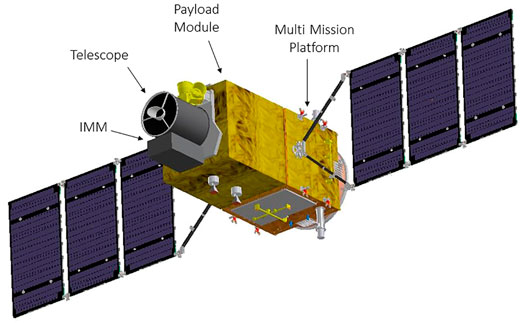
- Schematic representation of GSST mission on the multi-mission platform (PMM).
- Mission type: Solar observation
- Operator: National Institute for Space Research
- Website: https://www.gov.br/inpe/pt-br/area-conhecimento/engenharia-e-ciencias-espaciais/cgce/ciencia-espacial/gsst
- Mission duration: 5 years (proposed)

Orbital parameters
- Apoapsis altitude: 601.599 km
- Inclination: 97.749˚

Main telescope
- Type: Solar observatory
- Wavelengths: Ultraviolet

Instruments
- High-resolution UV/VIS camera Low-resolution camera for observing the solar disk Radiometer Electron and proton detector Magnetometer
- Representation by the Brazilian Space Agency

Galileo Solar Space Telescope – Multi-mission Platform (GSST-PMM) is a mission proposed by Brazil's National Institute for Space Research (INPE) that aims to precisely measure the solar radiation at the top of the Earth's atmosphere, the magnetic field in the photosphere and the upper solar atmosphere.

== Mission ==
=== Development ===
The project was initiated in November 2013 following an opportunity call from the Advisory Committee of the INPE's General Coordination of Space and Atmospheric Sciences. The first project was a prototype of a spectropolarimetry-based instrument that aimed to estimate the Sun's magnetic field. The Advisory Committee held several evaluation meetings between 2014 and 2018.

The mission planning initially consisted of three phases:

1. Development of a magnetograph and a visible light imaging instrument
2. Installation of a prototype instrument in a ground observatory
3. Development of the space observatory

It was also proposed the development of a prototype for testing in a balloon, but this stage was eventually eliminated.

INPE's Integrated Space Mission Project Center accepted the proposal after initial contact in December 2016. Analysis of the mission began in June 2017, with the study being presented in December of the same year. The feasibility study report was released in May 2018 and following this, the Working Group began discussing the GSST with both the scientific community and decision-makers.

The concept phase prototype, using a 150 mm telescope, was completed in July 2018. The advanced prototype had a 500 mm telescope. Initially, a workshop was to be held in March 2020 to discuss the mission with the international community, but it was canceled due to the COVID-19 pandemic. In the second half of 2020, after the restructuring of INPE, the continuity of the project was discussed, and the use of the Multi-mission platform, used in the Amazônia 1 satellite, was proposed and validated.

==== ProSAME ====
On May 8, 2023, the project was presented to the AEB and on May 19, the necessary documents were submitted for the Admission Card of the Procedure for Selection and Adoption of Space Missions (ProSAME) of the Brazilian Space Agency (AEB).

After several steps had been taken, on September 21, Dr. Clezio Marcos de Nardin, director of INPE, sent a letter to the president of the Brazilian Space Agency, making the adoption of GSST conditional on the installation and operation of a 500 mm ground telescope at the Pico dos Dias Observatory for two uninterrupted years, which, according to researcher and principal investigator Luís Eduardo Antunes Vieira, would interrupt the continuity of the project and would not have the slightest technical basis, as the ground and space instruments are different pieces of equipment: the ground equipment uses visible light, while the space equipment will operate in the ultraviolet, in addition to the Earth's rotation and climatic conditions making uninterrupted use impossible. The installation of the telescope on Pico dos Dias was never 100% necessary, and was only considered for the equipment to continue to be useful. The initial meeting between INPE and the National Astrophysics Laboratory to install the equipment at Pico dos Dias took place on September 28, 2023. It was later discovered that Dr. Clezio Nardin had not sent the complete documentation to the AEB.

Researcher Luis Vieira aimed to draw the attention of the international community with his Request for Support, also creating an online petition. As a result, at a meeting on December 7, 2023, the GSST Mission was officially approved in the AEB Qualification Portfolio. At the ProSAME policy meeting held on December 4, 2025, it was revealed that the project did not have its own engineering team and that no progress had been made in its development. At the meeting on July 28, 2026, it was revealed that the principal investigator had submitted the preliminary documents for project approval.

=== Objectives ===
GSST aims to measure, precisely, the solar irradiance at the top of the Earth's atmosphere, the magnetic field in the photosphere and in the upper layers of the solar atmosphere, as well as addressing various processes that act on the Sun, with an understanding of the solar irradiance at the top of the Earth's atmosphere being fundamental to understanding climate change.

According to researcher Luís Eduardo Antunes Vieira, the GSST is a pioneering mission in the Brazilian space program, aiming to carry out high-resolution observations, which will seek to answer the following questions: "What is the influence of solar activity on the Earth's climate? What are the fundamental physical processes taking place on the Sun? How does the solar dynamo work? What are the relative contributions of the different physical processes that lead to the heating of the outer layers of the solar atmosphere (chromosphere to corona)? What effect does the variable structure of the solar magnetic field have on the evolution of the Earth's atmosphere-ocean coupled system? What are the responses of magnetic fields and energetic particles in the vicinity of the Earth due to the different structures of the solar wind?".

By combining the data from this mission with data from NASA, ESA and JAXA missions, GSST will improve the development of INPE's space weather products and services. It is proposed that the telescope will be in an orbit 601.599 km above the equator, with an inclination of 97.749˚, being considered a Low Earth orbit, geostationary or heliosynchronous, needing total visibility of the solar disk for 90% of the time of a mission expected to last five years. The satellite is planned to be deorbited 25 years after the end of the main mission.

==== Payload ====
In the mission's study report, published in 2018, the following equipment was proposed:

1. A high-resolution UV/VIS camera and a low-resolution camera to observe the solar disk as a way of understanding the evolution of the magnetic structures of the Sun's outer layer;
2. A radiometer to understand the Sun's influence on the Earth's climate;
3. An electron and proton detector, as well as a magnetometer, to understand the Sun's influence on geospace.

== See also ==
- List of Brazilian satellites
- List of proposed space telescopes

== Bibliography ==
Primary sources

- Brasileira, Agência Espacial (2023). Programa Nacional de Atividades Espaciais – PNAE 2022–2031 (in Brazilian Portuguese) (2 ed.). Brasília: Agência Espacial Brasileira. p. 91. ISBN 978-65-980268-1-3.
- "Galileo Solar Space Telescope: Mission Study Report" (PDF). gov.br. CPRIME. May 25, 2018. p. 101.

News

- Vieira, Prof. Dr. Luís Eduardo Antunes (2023a). "A Missão Telescópio Solar Espacial Galileo e a Batalha contra o Negacionismo –" (in Brazilian Portuguese).

Scientific articles

- Carlesso, Franciele; Rodríguez Gómez, Jenny Marcela; Barbosa, Adriany Rodrigues; Antunes Vieira, Luis Eduardo; Dal Lago, Alisson (June 24, 2022). "Solar Irradiance Variability Monitor for the Galileo Solar Space Telescope Mission: Concept and Challenges". Frontiers in Physics. 10 869738. Bibcode:2022FrP....10.9738C. doi:10.3389/fphy.2022.869738. ISSN 2296-424X.

== Additional reading ==
- Barbosa, Adriany Rodrigues (2021). Analysis of the uncertainties in the determination of the stokes parameters employing the proof of concept prototype of the spectropolarimeter for the Galileo Solar Space Telescope (GSST/INPE) (Post-graduation thesis). São José dos Campos.
- Rodrigues Barbosa, Adriany; Carlesso, Franciele; Vieira, Luis Eduardo Antunes (October 20, 2022). "Development of a proof-of-concept spectropolarimeter in the framework of the GSST mission: Characterization and performance analysis of a sCMOS image sensor". Frontiers in Astronomy and Space Sciences. 9 995492. doi:10.3389/fspas.2022.995492. ISSN 2296-987X.
- Vieira, L. E. A.; de Gonzalez, A. L. Clúa; Lago, A. Dal; Wrasse, C.; Echer, E.; Guarnieri, F. L.; Cardoso, F. Reis; Guerrero, G.; Costa, J. Rezende; Palacios, J.; Balmaceda, L.; Alves, L. Ribeiro; da Silva, L.; Costa, L. L.; Sampaio, M. (December 2014). "Preliminary design of the INPE's Solar Vector Magnetograph". Proceedings of the International Astronomical Union. 10 (S305): 195–199. arXiv:1609.00995. doi:10.1017/S1743921315004767. ISSN 1743-9213.
- Carlesso; Gómez; Berni; Savonov; Vieira; Vilela; de Miranda (December 1, 2018). Projeto Preliminar de um Radiômetro Absoluto Para Medir a Irradiância Solar Total. Anais Congresso Brasileiro de Energia Solar (in Brazilian Portuguese). doi:10.59627/cbens.2018.647.
