= Brasilsat B3 =

Brazilian communications satellite

- Mission type: Communications
- Operator: Star One
- COSPAR ID: 1998-006A
- SATCAT no.: 25152
- Mission duration: 12 years

Spacecraft properties
- Bus: HS-376W
- Manufacturer: Hughes Aircraft
- Launch mass: 1,757 kilograms (3,874 lb)
- BOL mass: 1,052 kilograms (2,319 lb)

Start of mission
- Launch date: 04 February 1998, 23:29 UTC
- Rocket: Ariane-44LP H10-3
- Launch site: Kourou ELA-2

Orbital parameters
- Reference system: Geocentric
- Regime: Geostationary
- Longitude: 92° west
- Semi-major axis: 42,125.0 kilometers (26,175.3 mi)
- Perigee altitude: 35,752.6 kilometers (22,215.6 mi)
- Apogee altitude: 35,755.9 kilometers (22,217.7 mi)
- Inclination: 3.7°
- Period: 1,434.1 minutes

Transponders
- Band: 28 IEEE C-band

Brasilsat B3 is a Brazilian communications satellite. It was launched on 4 February 1998 by an Ariane 44LP carrier rocket, as part of a dual-payload launch with Inmarsat-3 F5. It was built by Hughes Aircraft, based on the HS-376 satellite bus. It operates by Star One, a subsidiary of Embratel.

== Objectives ==
The Brasilsat B3 was launched to meet the great demand of the Brazilian market and to bring satellite communication to some cities in the Amazon Region, which still did not have access to satellite services; these locations were for the first time connected to Brazil and the world. In addition, the B3 unveiled the Brasilsat B2, which has now been used in open or pay-TV broadcasts, telephony services and data transmission.

== History ==
Brasilsat is the name of a group of Brazilian satellites destined to provide communications via satellites, mainly to Brazil. In February 1998, the Brasilsat B3 satellite was launched, currently located at 92 degrees west longitude, in an inclined orbit where it meets the growing demand for telephony from several operators, mainly in the interior of Brazil. The satellite is one of the pioneers to transmit digital signal, with 100% of the programming being displayed in the new system. Brasilsat B3 coverage is national and the channels that were broadcast by the satellite were mostly free to air.

Brasilsat B3 was the third satellite launched from Brazil's second generation of communications satellites, which are the result of joint engineering and manufacturing efforts in the US and Brazil. The new series of satellites was called "Brasilsat B'. Embratel, a Brazilian telecommunications company, signed a contract in August 1990 for the construction of the first two satellites of the series, Brasilsat B1 and Brasilsat B2. In December 1995, with new satellites in orbit and unable to meet customer demand, Embratel decided to launch a third satellite, Brasilsat B3. The fourth and last satellite of the series, Brasilsat B4, was ordered in June 1998. Brasilsat B3 was operated directly by Embratel until the end of 2000, when Star One, a subsidiary of that company was formed and assigned to manage the former fleet of Embratel satellites.

After the satellite was launched in February 1998, it was placed in the orbital position of 65 degrees west longitude for testing, where it remained until April of the same year when it was moved to 84 degrees west, remained until August 2008, when it was transferred to 75 degrees west and Brasilsat B3 remained in this position in normal geostationary orbit until April 2012, when it was placed in inclined orbit. The satellite was moved to 92 degrees west in January 2013, where it remains currently in inclined orbit.

Its replacement in the orbital position of 75 degrees west to continue with the radio and TV broadcasts was the Star One C3 satellite, which was launched in late 2012, and is covering Brazil and neighboring countries in South America.
