= Hispasat 1B =

Spanish communications satellite

- Mission type: Communications satellite
- Operator: Hispasat
- COSPAR ID: 1993-048A
- SATCAT no.: 22723
- Mission duration: 10 years

Spacecraft properties
- Bus: Eurostar E2000
- Manufacturer: Matra Marconi Space
- Launch mass: 2,194 kg
- BOL mass: 1,325 kg
- Dry mass: 1,100 kg
- Payload mass: 280 kg
- Dimensions: 1.7 x 1.9 x 2.1 m (22.02 m solar array span)
- Power: 3,790 W

Start of mission
- Launch date: 22/07/1993
- Rocket: Ariane-44L H10+
- Launch site: Guiana Space Centre
- Contractor: Arianespace

End of mission
- Disposal: graveyard orbit
- Deactivated: 06/06/2006

Orbital parameters
- Semi-major axis: 42,320 km
- Altitude: 35,800 km
- Periapsis altitude: 35,945.6 km
- Apoapsis altitude: 35,953.1 km
- Inclination: 30º W
- Period: 24.07 hours

Payload
- (12+6) Ku-band (8-55 W, 4-110 W) transponders, (3+1) X-band (110 W) transponders

The Hispasat 1B was a Spanish communications satellite operated by Hispasat. Along with the Hispasat 1A, the satellite covered communications over the American Continent for both civilian and military customers. Together they formed the first European constellation operating over the New World. Its service life ended in 2003.

== Body ==
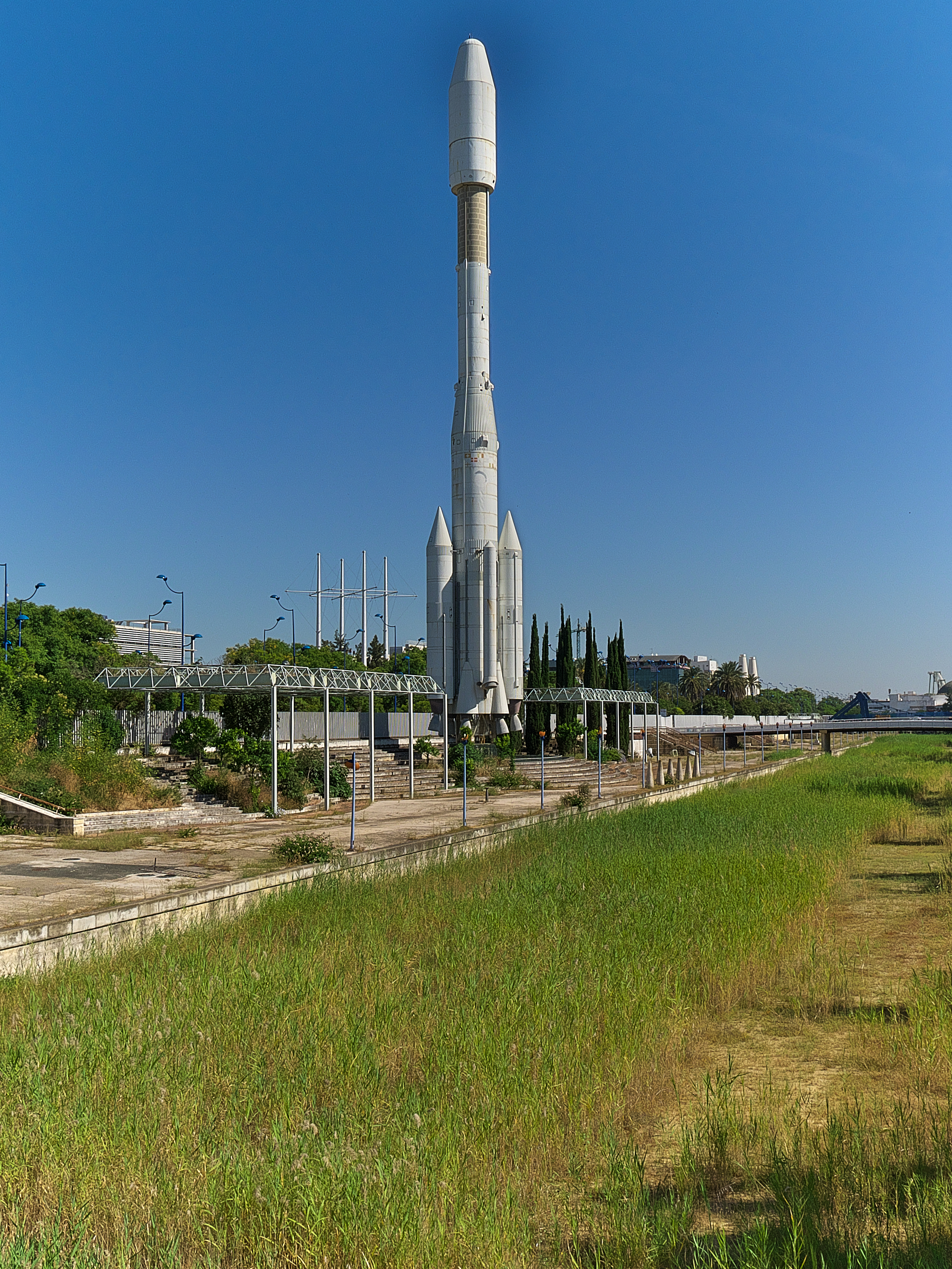
Ariane 4 rocket.

Similarly to the Hispasat 1A, the body of the Hispasat 1B was based on the Eurostar E2000 bus. It consisted on a box shaped metal casing (1.7 x 1.9 x 2.21 meters) with retractable solar panels on the lateral faces (when extended measured 22.02 m) and space for the communications module on the upper and lower faces. It was built by Matra Marconi Space (now part of Airbus Defence and Space).

The satellite weighted 2,194 kg at launch and had a dry weight of 1,100 kg. It was 3 axis stabilized.

=== Propulsion ===
The satellite was propulsed by a R-4D-11 hypergolic engine (originally developed by Marquardt Corporation for its use in the Apollo program). It was provided by Aerojet Rocketdyne and was capable of developing 490 N of thrust in vacuum. It weighed 3.76 kg.

=== Communications module ===
The satellite offered both civilian and military communication channels for its customers. Its main module consisted of 15 active transponders: three X-band (compatible with NATO Standards) with one spare, for its military customers, and 12 Ku-band (8 at 55 W, 4 at 110 W) with six spares, for the civilian market.

The module was divided between the upper, containing the high gain antenna and lower (containing a set of low gain antennas) faces of the prism.

== Launch ==
The satellite was successfully launched 22 July 1993 on board an Ariane-44L H10+ from the Guiana Space Center along with the Indian satellite INSAT-2B.

Its orbit is geostationary (GEO) 30º West, around 35,800 km high (35,945.6 km of perigee and 35,953.1 km of apogee) with 12.4º of inclination, a period of 1,444.1 minutes a RCS of 7.9621 m^{2} and a semi-major axis of 42,320 km.

During its service life it was monitored from Hispasat's headquarters in Madrid. Its operating life officially ended in 2003 although some of its transponders remained active until 6 June 2006 when the satellite was definitely moved to a graveyard orbit.

== See also ==
- Hispasat 1A
