= Vivo (telecommunications company) =

Telecommunications company in Brazil

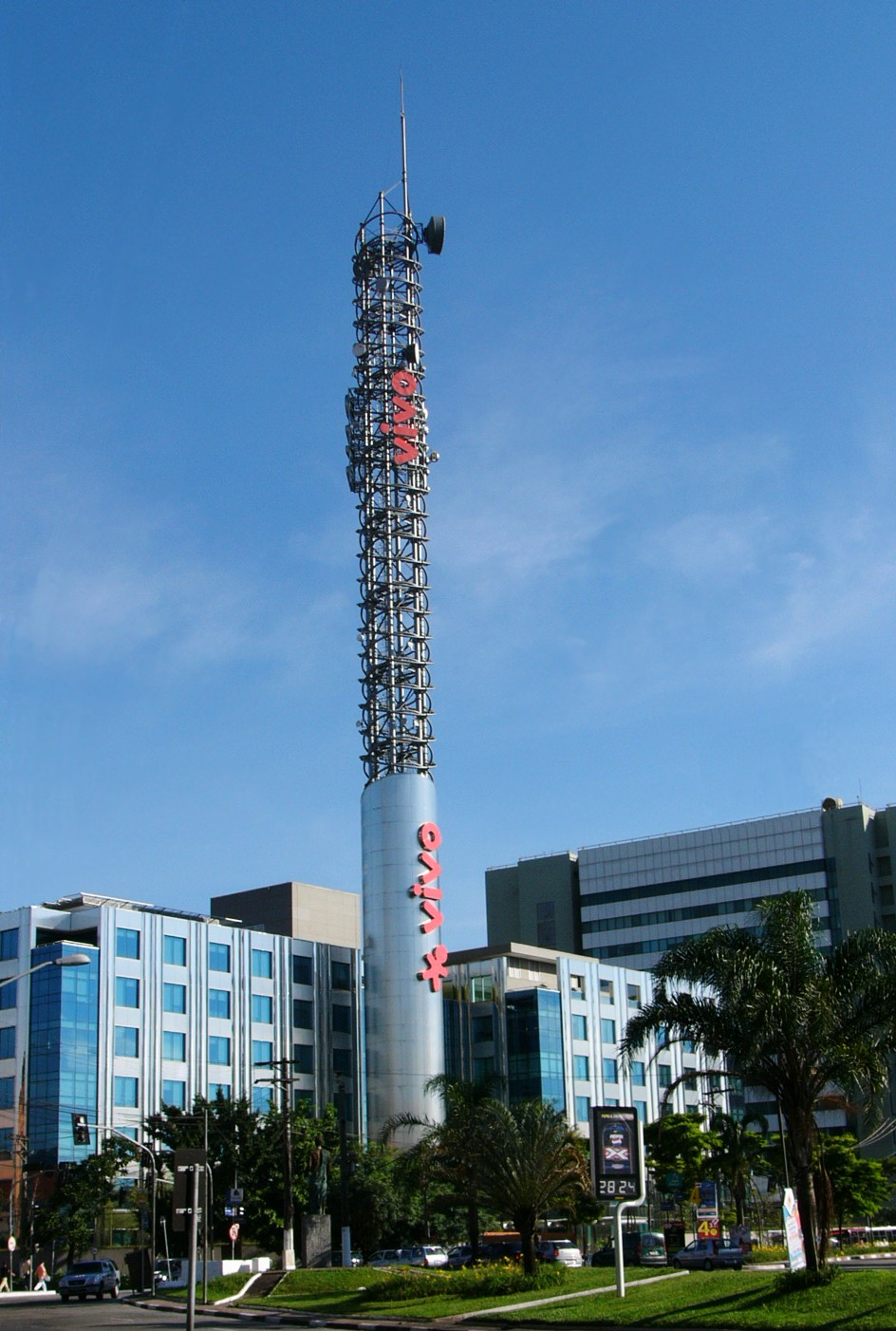
- Former Vivo headquarters in São Paulo
- Type: Brand of Telefônica Brasil
- Industry: Telecommunications
- Founded: 1993; 33 years ago (as Telesp Celular); April 13, 2003; 23 years ago (as Vivo)
- Headquarters: São Paulo, Brazil
- Area served: 5,046 municipalities: Coverage: 5,046 (97.9% of Brazil); 3G: 4,879 (97%); 4G LTE: 4,381 (94.1%); 4.5G LTE: 2,855 (81.9%)
- Key people: Christian Gebara (CEO); Eduardo de Carvalho (chairman)
- Products: Fixed, mobile, Internet, television
- Revenue: ▲ R$64.61 billion (2021)
- Operating income: ▲ R$6.96 billion (2021)
- Net income: ▲ R$6.22 billion (2021)
- Owner: Telefônica Brasil (subsidiary of Telefónica)
- Number of employees: ▼133,473 (2021): Outsourced: 100,922; Employees: 32,551
- Website: vivo.com.br

Vivo (Portuguese and Spanish for 'Live', as in Live Broadcasting, or 'Alive'), known as Vivo Brazil, is a Brazilian brand of Telefônica Brasil, a subsidiary of the Spanish telecommunications company Telefónica and the largest telecommunications company in Brazil. It is headquartered in the Brooklin Novo neighborhood of São Paulo.

== History ==
The company was originally formed as part of Telebrás, the state-owned telecom monopoly at the time. In 1998, Telebrás was demerged and privatized. Telefónica bought Telesp, the São Paulo division, and rebranded it to Telefónica. On 15 April 2012, all Telefónica services were rebranded again to Vivo, using the same strategy of unifying all its services in a unique brand, like Movistar (Hispanic America and Spain) and O_{2} (rest of Europe).

=== Merged companies ===
The following operators merged to form Vivo:

Owned by Telefónica

- Telefónica Celular (Rio de Janeiro, Espírito Santo, Rio Grande do Sul)
- Telebahia Celular (Bahia)
- Telergipe Celular (Sergipe)
- Telesp Landline (São Paulo)

Owned by Portugal Telecom

- Telesp Celular (São Paulo)
- Global Telecom (Paraná, Santa Catarina)
- Norte Brasil Telecom (a.k.a. NBT) (Amazonas, Roraima, Pará, Amapá, Maranhão)

Acquired by the joint venture

- TCO Celular (Goiás, the Federal District, Acre, Tocantins, Mato Grosso, Mato Grosso do Sul)
- Telemig Celular (Minas Gerais)

New operations in the Northeast region

- Vivo (Ceará, Alagoas, Rio Grande do Norte, Pernambuco, Paraíba, Piauí), since October 2008.

=== Vivo brand ===
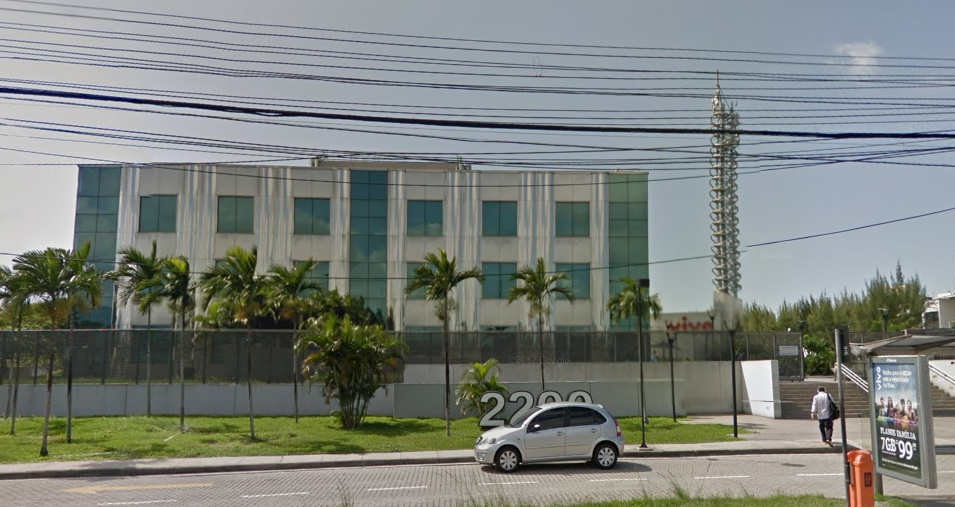
Vivo building in Rio de Janeiro

The Vivo brand was launched on 13 April 2003, as a mobile phone service provider. It's the largest provider in Brazil with over 76 million users. It originated from the merger of several Brazilian mobile phone operations under a joint venture owned equally by Portugal Telecom (PT) and Spain's Telefónica. Until 2006, the group was composed of six holding companies which, as announced in November 2005, merged into a single holding company, "Vivo Participações". The operation was concluded on 22 February 2006. In July 2010, Telefónica bought PT's shares.

Today Vivo operates an UMTS, 3G networks and bands 1, 7, 3, 28 4G LTE in most Brazilian cities. Initially, the network was based on analog AMPS (IS-95) and parts (resulting from acquisition of other companies), using TDMA (IS-136). These were all converted to GSM beginning in 2006, when, after years being the only CDMA network. For some years, GSM and CDMA networks coexisted. In the second half of the 2000s, the CDMA network was gradually converted to CDMA2000 in the major cities. The CDMA network was discontinued in November 2012.

In 2012, the fixed services in the state of São Paulo were rebranded from Telefónica to Vivo, unifying the brands for fixed and mobile services since then.

==== Vivo brands ====
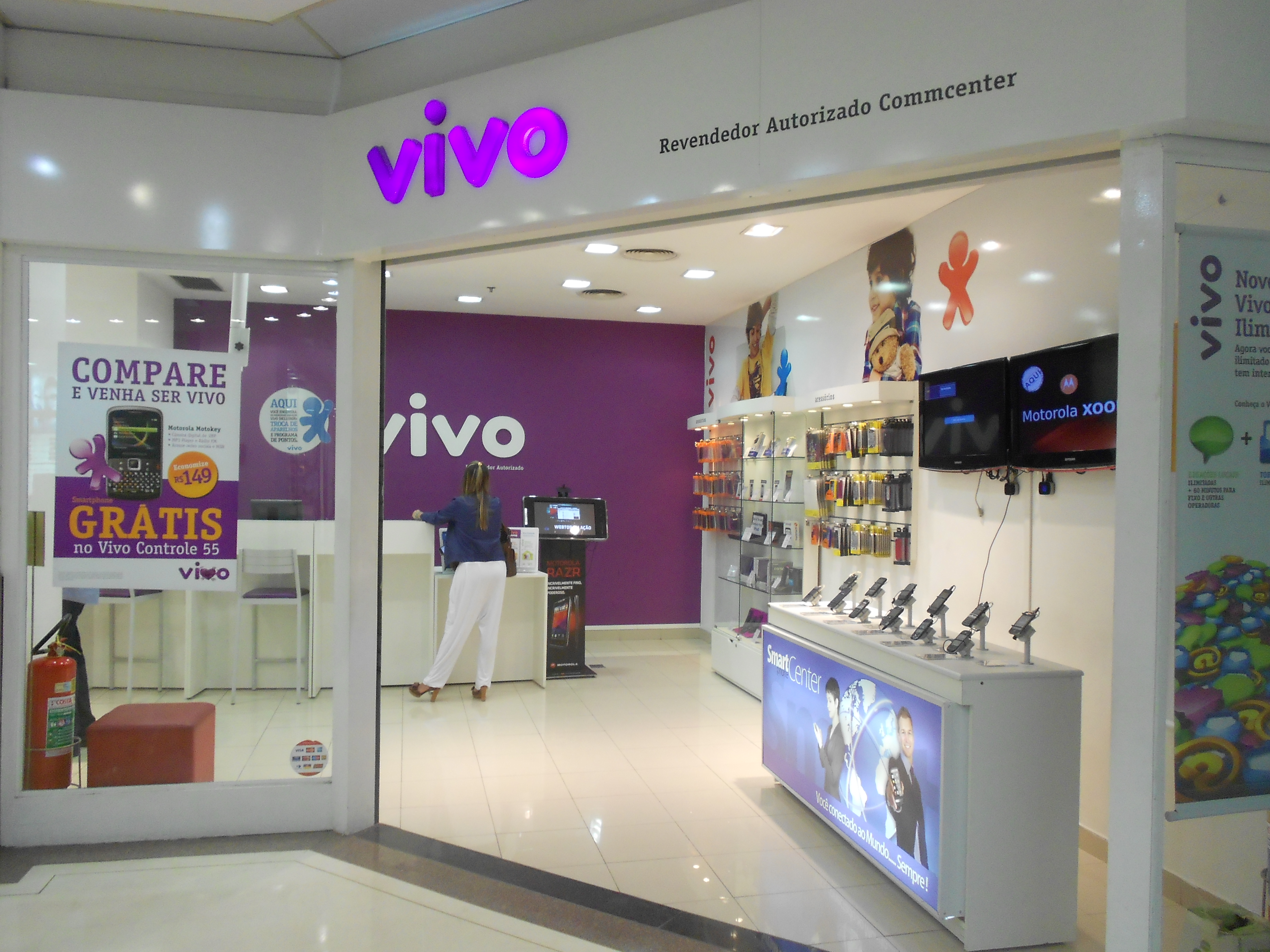
Vivo Store in Rio de Janeiro

Vivo owns the following brands:

- Vivo Móvel (mobile service)
  - Vivo 4G (4G LTE)
  - Vivo 4G Plus (4G LTE Advanced Pro)
  - Vivo 5G (5G)
- Vivo Fixo (landline service, formerly Telefônica)
  - Vivo Internet (ADSL broadband, formerly Speedy)
  - Vivo Internet Plus (Cable broadband, formerly Ajato and Vivo Speedy, being discontinued)
  - Vivo Fibra (FTTH broadband, as of 4Q2020, +50% of broadband users)
- Vivo TV (initially satellite television, DTH, formerly Telefônica TV Digital)
  - Vivo TV (satellite TV)
  - Vivo TV Plus (cable television, formerly TVA, being discontinued as of 4Q2020)
  - Vivo TV Fibra (FTTH television service)

== See also ==
- Telefônica Brasil (since 1998)
- Portugal Telecom
- Telecommunications in Brazil
- List of internet service providers in Brazil
