= Amazonas 1 =

Defunct communications satellite

Amazonas 1 Hispasat 55W-1
- Mission type: Communications
- Operator: Hispasat
- COSPAR ID: 2004-031A
- SATCAT no.: 28393
- Mission duration: 15 years

Spacecraft properties
- Bus: Eurostar 3000
- Manufacturer: Astrium
- Launch mass: 4,545 kilograms (10,020 lb)
- Dimensions: 5,88 m x 2,4 m x 2,9 m (body); 36,10 m (solar arrays)
- Power: 9,500 watts (EOL)

Start of mission
- Launch date: 5 August 2004
- Rocket: Proton-M Briz-M
- Launch site: Baikonur, Kazakhstan

End of mission
- Disposal: Graveyard orbit
- Deactivated: 23 June 2017

Orbital parameters
- Reference system: Geocentric
- Regime: Geostationary

Transponders
- Band: C, Ku

Amazonas 1 or Hispasat 55W-1 was a communications satellite based on the Eurostar 3000 satellite bus and owned by satellites operator Hispasat, based in Madrid, Spain. It was launched on 5 August 2004, with a launch mass of 4,5 ton, on a Proton-M Briz-M launcher to be located in the 61º W geostationary position.

Amazonas 1 payloads were 36 Ku band transponders that provided communications services in Europe and America, and 27 C band transponders that provided services in America. In 2013 it was relocated to the 36º W position and replaced by Amazonas 3.

In March 2016, Hispasat announced that Amazonas 1 would be renamed as Hispasat 55W-1. Finally, the satellite was moved to a graveyard orbit and deactivated on 23 June 2017.
