= Hispasat AG1 =

Spanish communications satellite

Hispasat Advanced Generation 1
- Mission type: Communications satellite
- Operator: Hispasat
- COSPAR ID: 2017-006A
- SATCAT no.: 41942
- Website: Hispasat 36W-1

Spacecraft properties
- Bus: Luxor
- Manufacturer: OHB System; Tesat-Spacecom; Thales Alenia Space
- Launch mass: 3,200 kilograms (7,100 lb)
- Dry mass: 1,700 kilograms (3,700 lb)
- Power: > 6.0 kW

Start of mission
- Launch date: 01:03:34, January 28, 2017 (UTC)
- Rocket: Soyuz-2 ST-B
- Launch site: Kourou ELS
- Contractor: Arianespace

Orbital parameters
- Reference system: Geocentric
- Regime: Geostationary

Transponders
- Band: K_{a} band, K_{u} band
- Bandwidth: 144 MHz (K_{a}); 33 and 36 MHz (K_{u})

Instruments
- Redsat

Hispasat Advanced Generation 1 (Hispasat AG1), also designated Hispasat 36W-1, is a Spanish communications satellite which is part of the Hispasat fleet. It was successfully launched to GTO on 28 January 2017.

The satellite will serve Spain, Portugal and the Americas.

== See also ==
- Hispasat 30W-6
