= S400 (rocket engine) =

- Country of origin: Germany
- First flight: 1974-12-19
- Designer: ArianeGroup
- Application: apogee engines
- Status: Operational

Liquid-fuel engine
- Propellant: MON / MMH
- Mixture ratio: 1.50 to 1.80
- Cycle: Pressure-fed engine

Configuration
- Chamber: 1

Performance
- Thrust, vacuum: 425 newtons (96 lbf)
- Chamber pressure: 1 megapascal (150 psi)
- Specific impulse, vacuum: 321 seconds (3.15 km/s)
- Burn time: 8.5 hours

Dimensions
- Length: 669 millimetres (26.3 in)
- Diameter: 316 millimetres (12.4 in)
- Dry mass: 4.30 kilograms (9.5 lb)

Used in
- Communications Satellite

The S400 is a family of pressure fed liquid propelled rocket engines manufactured by ArianeGroup (former Airbus DS) at the Orbital Propulsion Centre in Lampoldshausen, Germany.

They burn MMH and MON as propellant, have a thrust range between 340 newtons (76 lbf) and 450 newtons (100 lbf) and can vary the O/F ratio between 1.50 and 1.80. The chamber and throat are made of a platinum alloy, which uses double cone vortex injectors and uses both film and radiative cooling. The S400 engines are used as primary apogee engines for telecommunication satellite platforms such as the Spacebus of Thales Alenia Space as well as space exploration missions such as Venus Express, ExoMars Trace Gas Orbiter or Jupiter Icy Moons Explorer.

The S400 family has had an extensive history in the commercial telecommunication market. Its first launch was aboard the Symphonie 1 in 1974. This was the first commercial three-axis stabilized communications satellite in geostationary orbit with a bipropellant rocket propulsion system. It also was the first European communications satellite system. This family of engines have displayed a remarkable competitiveness, still winning many designs (for 2015, it is expected to fly on Sicral 2, ARSAT-2, Hispasat AG1 and MSG-4.

Engine	Propellant	Nominal Thrust	Range	I_{sp}	Comments
S400-12	MON / MMH	420N	340N - 440N	318s	
S400-15	MON / MMH	425N	340N - 440N	321s	
