= Star One B4 =

Brazilian communications satellite

- Mission type: Communication
- Operator: Embratel; Star One
- COSPAR ID: 2000-046A
- SATCAT no.: 26469
- Mission duration: 12 years

Spacecraft properties
- Bus: HS-376W
- Manufacturer: Hughes
- Launch mass: 2,495 kilograms (5,501 lb)
- Dry mass: 1,757 kilograms (3,874 lb)

Start of mission
- Launch date: 17 August 2000, 23:16:00 UTC
- Rocket: Ariane 44LP-3
- Launch site: Kourou ELA-2
- Contractor: Arianespace

End of mission
- Deactivated: June 2021

Orbital parameters
- Reference system: Geocentric
- Regime: Geostationary
- Longitude: 75° West / 92° West / 70° West / 84° West
- Semi-major axis: 42,165.0 kilometres (26,200.1 mi)
- Perigee altitude: 35,782.3 kilometres (22,234.1 mi)
- Apogee altitude: 35,806.1 kilometres (22,248.9 mi)
- Inclination: 1°
- Period: 1,436.1 minutes

Transponders
- Band: 28 IEEE C-band (NATO G/H-band)

Star One B4, originally designated Brasilsat B4, is a Brazilian communications satellite which is operated by Star One. It was constructed by the Hughes Space and Communications Company, and is based on the HS-376W satellite bus. It was the penultimate HS-376, and final HS-376W to be launched. Its launch was contracted by Arianespace, using an Ariane 4 44LP-3 carrier rocket. The launch occurred at 23:16 GMT on 17 August 2000, from the ELA-2 launch pad at the Guiana Space Centre. The Nilesat 102 satellite was launched on the same rocket.

It was originally built and launched as Brasilsat B4 for Embratel, and was later transferred to Embratel's subsidiary Star One and renamed. Following its launch it raised itself into geostationary orbit by means of its onboard R-4D apogee motor, and was positioned at 75° West for on-orbit testing. This was completed in September 2000, and it was moved to 92° West, arriving in October. It remained at that position until January 2007 when it was relocated to 70° West. It arrived on station in February, and subsequently departed in June 2008. In July 2008 it arrived at 84° West, where it is currently stationed. It carries twenty eight transponders, and has an expected on-orbit lifespan of 12 years. It initially replaced the Brasilsat A2 satellite.

and the end of satellite Brasilsat B4 was moved to junk orbit in June 2021.
