= Amazonas 4A =

Spanish communications satellite

Hispasat 74W-1
- Names: Amazonas 4A, Amazonas 4
- Operator: Hispasat
- COSPAR ID: 2014-011A
- SATCAT no.: 39616
- Mission duration: 15 years

Spacecraft properties
- Bus: GEOStar-2
- Manufacturer: Orbital Sciences Corporation
- Launch mass: 2,938 kg
- Dry mass: 1,241 kg

Start of mission
- Rocket: Ariane 5 ECA
- Launch site: Kourou Space Center

Orbital parameters
- Longitude: 73.9º W
- Semi-major axis: 42,164 km
- Periapsis altitude: 35,780.1 km
- Apoapsis altitude: 35,807.6 km
- Inclination: 0.1º
- Period: 1,436.1 minutes

Payload
- 24 Ku-band transponders

The Amazonas 4A, renamed in 2016 Amazonas 4 and since 2017 known as the Hispasat 74W-1, is a Spanish commercial communications satellite developed by Orbital Sciences Corporation and operated by Hispasat. It was successfully launched in 2014 and it is expected to have a service life of 15 years however, shortly after its launch the satellite suffered a power failure that limited its operability and life.

It is positioned to cover all of South America and during its service life the satellite has offered coverage for some important events such as the 2016 Summer Olympics and World Cup football broadcasts.

== Body ==
The satellite is based on the GEO Star-2.4 bus and has a dry mass of 1,241 kg. It is shaped like a square-faced prism 5 meters tall. Its lateral faces hold two deployable reflector-antennas and two retracting solar panels that, when fully deployed, give the satellite a diameter nearing 23 meters. At launch, its mass was increased to 2,938 kg.

=== Propulsion ===
The main engine is the bipropellant BT-4 developed by the Japanese company IHI Aerospace. It is fueled by unsymmetrical dimethylhydrazine using dinitrogen tetroxide as the oxidizer. The fuel is stored in spherical tanks pressurized with Helium.

The engine alone is 0.65 meters tall and has a dry mass of 4 kg while capable of producing 450 N of thrust.

=== Attitude Determination & Control Subsystem ===
The attitude and control subsystem is state of the art employing a combination of electrically powered set of reaction wheels and chemical-inertial Hydrazine monopropellant thrusters in order to provide precise Earth-pointing capabilities.

=== Electrical Power Subsystem ===
The power requirements of the satellite are up to 4.8 kW although it was projected to support up to 6.2 kW. Those are provided by a combination of two independent arrays each composed by four panels featuring Ultra-Triple-Junction GaAs Solar cells and two 5,053 Watt-Hour Li-Ion batteries and avionics for power storage and distribution.

=== Communications Subsystem ===
The communications subsystem is the main payload of the satellite. It consists on 24 Ku-band transponders subdivided in two 15-for-12 groups of Linearized Channel Travelling Wave Tube Amplifiers (LCTWTAs). In addition to two 2.5 x 2.7 meter single shell super elliptical deployable reflectors. All of them orientable and capable of working individually or grouped in order to speed up or relay communications. Nonetheless, a power failure in the electrical subsystem provoked the quick degradation of the subsystem and it has been speculated that, as a result, the satellite lost almost half of its communication potential being able to maintain only 12 of its transponders operational. In conjunction to the natural degradation of the solar panels in space, has greatly shortened the satellite's service life and its utility.

Its design signal strength lies between 46 and 48.5 dBW throughout all of South America.

== Launch ==
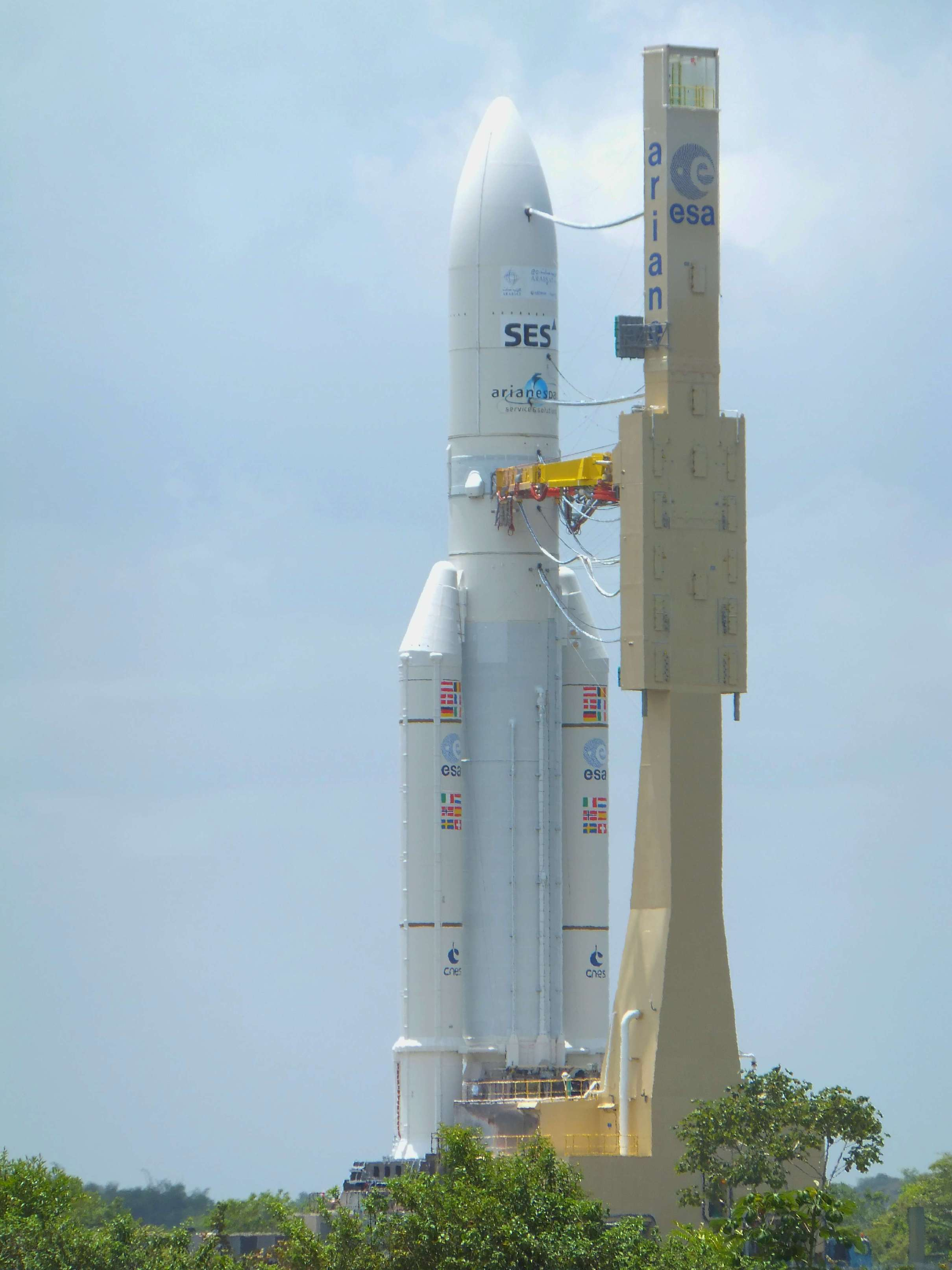
An Ariane 5 ECA rocket.

The satellite was launched the 22nd of March 2014, at 22:04 UTC, via an Ariane 5 ECA vehicle, from the Guiana Space Center in Kourou, French Guiana. The launch was shared with the Astra 5B satellite. Amazonas 4A was successfully put into a GEO orbit of 35,807.6 km of apogee and 35,780.1 km of perigee, an inclination of 0.1º, a period of 1,436.1 minutes and a semi major maxis of 42,164 km. Since it was designed to cover all of South America, it initially operated on the longitude 61º W but since 2017 it has shifted to 73.9º W.

=== Power failure ===
Shortly after reaching its intended orbit the satellite suffered a partial power failure losing some of its capabilities and shortening its operational life.

The loss was estimated to halve the satellite's capabilities. However, the difficulty in assessing the causes and severity of the failure forced Hispasat and the insurance company to open a joint investigation. It will remain open until the loss of the satellite, scheduled for 2029, but so far, the insured value has been estimated at 145 million euros. The economic impact of the power failure has been estimated at 11 million euros of lost income for the first quarter of 2014 for Hispasat, with a further 5.4 million euros lost in operating income.

In addition, the incident provoked the scrapping of the high power companion satellite, the Amazonas 4B, replaced by the future Amazonas 5 and the two renamings the satellite has undergone.

== Amazonas 4B ==
A preliminary agreement between Hispasat and Orbital Sciences Corporation was signed the 25th of June 2012. This agreement included the construction of two new satellites, Amazonas 4A and Amazonas 4B that will be located at orbital position 61 West longitude.

However, during 2014, in the wake of the partial power failure of the Amazonas 4A, the agreement was modified and the Amazonas 4B scrapped and replaced by the future project Amazonas 5. This time constructed by SSL. The Amazonas 5 was to provide the same capabilities of both the Amazonas 4A (previous to its power failure) and the Amazonas 4B. It was successfully put into orbit the 11th of September 2017.

Its planned specifications are not clear since it was cancelled before construction began. However, being projected together with the Amazonas 4A it is safe to assume that they would have been similar. Consequently, the Amazonas 4B was going to use the GEO Star-2.4 or the more modern GEO Star-3 as a bus. Its service life would have lasted about 15 years. It was projected that the engine would be the same as the Amazonas 4A: the BT-4 developed by the Japanese company IHI Aerospace. The communications subsystem was going to be the main payload of the satellite. It consisted of 18 Ku-band transponders, in addition to two 2.5 x 2.7 meter single shell super elliptical deployable reflectors.

== See also ==
- Hispasat
- Orbital Sciences Corporation
