= Scintillation Prediction Observations Research Task Mission =

Satellite-based equatorial ionosphere research

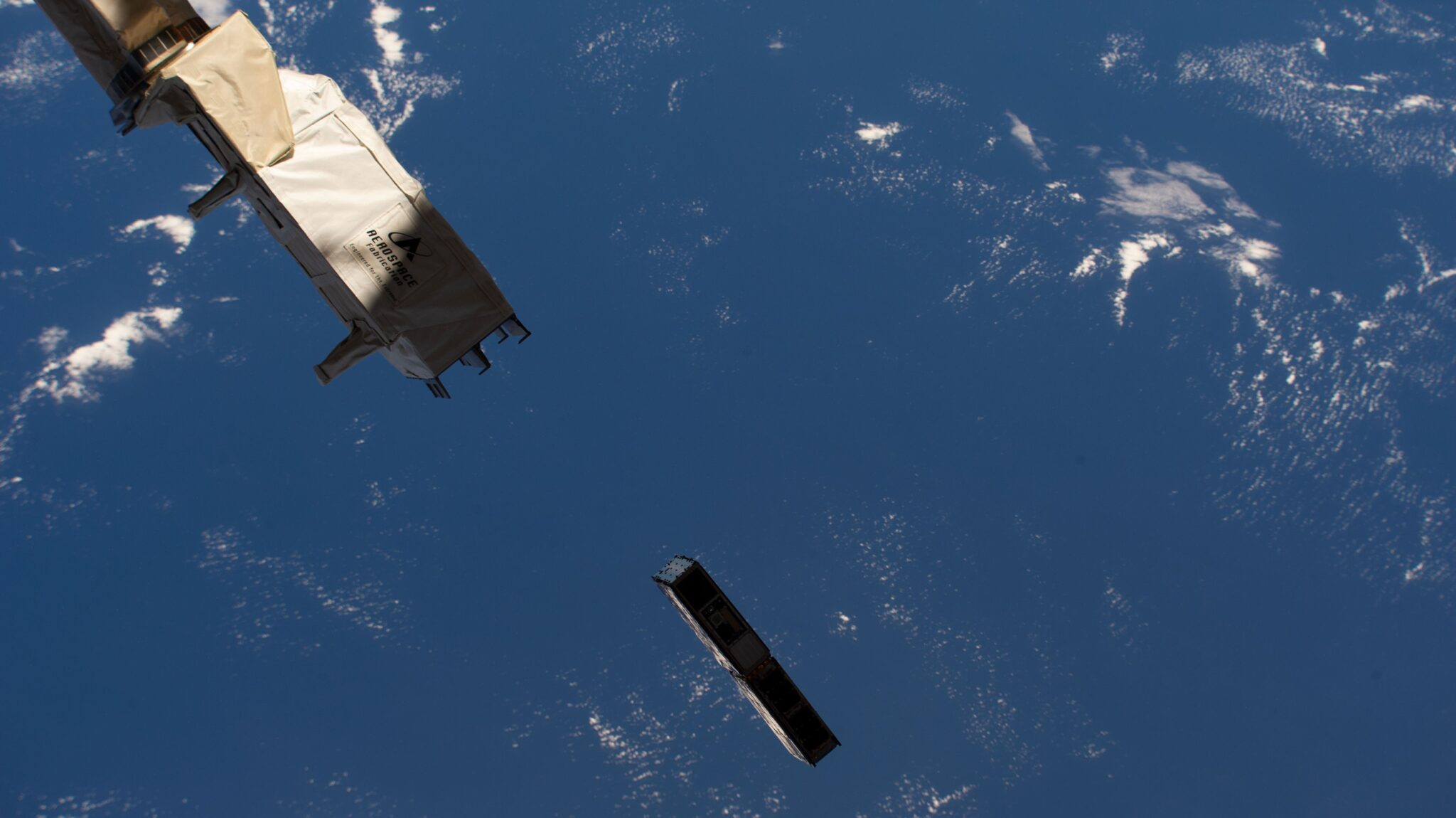
Launch of the SPORT satellite from the International Space Station (ISS)

The Scintillation Prediction Observations Research Task Mission (SPORT) is a partnership between several Brazilian and North American institutions whose objective is to place a small satellite into orbit dedicated to the study of the equatorial ionosphere. In Brazil, the project has institutional support from AEB, ITA and INPE. SPORT has received financial support from FAPESP via thematic project (nº 16/24970-7), valid from December 1, 2017, to November 30, 2022. In the USA side, the participating institutions are NASA, United States Air Force, Utah State University, University of Texas at Dallas, University of Alabama at Huntsville and the Aerospace Corporation. The satellite was launched on November 26, 2022, from the Kennedy Space Center in Florida, USA, and placed into orbit from the International Space Station (ISS) on December 29, 2022. Until April, the satellite carried out the commissioning stage to stabilize the satellite in its low orbit around the Earth. The satellite began carrying out science measurements from May 2023, with the detection of plasma bubbles having been publicly announced. The re-entry of the SPORT satellite into the atmosphere was scheduled for early October 2023.
