= Brasilsat A1 =

Brazilian communications satellite

Brasilsat-A1 / SBTS 1
- Mission type: Communication
- Operator: Embratel (1985-1995); PanAmSat (1995-2002)
- COSPAR ID: 1985-015B
- SATCAT no.: 15561
- Mission duration: 8 years (planned); 11 years (completed)

Spacecraft properties
- Bus: HS-376
- Manufacturer: Spar Aerospace / Hughes
- Launch mass: 1,195 kilograms (2,635 lb)
- Dry mass: 671 kilograms (1,479 lb)
- Power: 982 W

Start of mission
- Launch date: 08 February 1985, 23:22 UTC
- Rocket: Ariane 3
- Launch site: Kourou ELA-1

End of mission
- Deactivated: March 1, 2002

Orbital parameters
- Reference system: Geocentric
- Regime: Geostationary
- Longitude: 65° W
- Semi-major axis: 42,180.5 kilometres (26,209.7 mi)
- Eccentricity: 0.00072
- Perigee altitude: 35,779 kilometres (22,232 mi)
- Apogee altitude: 35,840 kilometres (22,270 mi)
- Inclination: 0.1°
- Period: 1,437.3 minutes
- Epoch: 08 February 1985

Transponders
- Band: 24 IEEE C-band (NATO G/H-band)

Brasilsat A1 was a Brazilian communications satellite which was operated by Embratel. It was constructed by the Spar Aerospace, and is based on the HS-376 satellite bus. The Brasilsat A1 was off duty in March 2002 and was transferred to the graveyard orbit.

== Specifications ==
The satellite had the shape of a cylinder, where at its top was located a directional antenna that opened after the launching of the satellite. The satellite had a mass in orbit of 671 kg, had a rotation stabilized between 50 and 55 rpm, its propellers used as a propellant 136 kg of hydrazine and was powered by solar cells that supplied 982 Watts at the beginning of its phase of operation, using two NiCd batteries as power reserve. It carried 24 C-band transmitters with six spare transmitters. They provided an effective incident radiated power (EIRP) of 34 dBW for most of the Brazilian territory.

- Lead contractor: Spar Aerospace
- Model used: HS-376
- Mass at launch: 1,195 kg
- Mass in orbit: 671 kg
- Diameter: 2.19 m
- Height: 7.09 m when open
- Stabilization: rotation stabilized at 50 rpm
- Power at start: 982 watts
- Final power: 799 watts
- Primary: 9 years (Extended: + 2 years)

== History ==
In the 1980s, Brazil needed its own satellites to exempt foreigners. As a result of this effort, the Brazilian company Embratel contracted in August 1982 the Canadian Spar Aerospace, in partnership with American Hughes, to build its series of satellites Brasilsat A, the series consisted of two satellites, the Brasilsat A1 and the Brasilsat A2. The Brasilsat A1 satellite was the first Brazilian satellite to give Brazil independence in satellite telecommunications services, through the former state-owned Embratel, now privatized. Before it, Embratel only rented third-party satellite transmitters.

The satellite was launched on February 8, 1985, by an Ariane model rocket from the Kourou launch base in French Guiana and placed in a geostationary orbit over Brazilian territory.

Two satellites were acquired from the company Spar Aerospace, model HS-376, manufactured under Hughes Space licenses. They cost about $125 million. The satellites initially received the name of Brasilsat 1 and 2 and formed the beginning of the Sistema Brasileiro de Telecomunicações por Satélite or SBTS (in English: Brazilian Telecommunications Satellite System). The satellite was stationed on the meridian 65 degrees west. Subsequent to the launch of the second generation of Brasilsat satellites, they were renamed Brasilsat A1 and A2. With the end of its life and already in an inclined orbit, the Brasilsat A1 was sold to HCI in October 1995. The antenna was redirected to North America. Control of the satellite was passed to PanAmSat on November 12, 1997.

After the satellite was launched in February 1985, it was placed in the orbital position of 65 degrees west longitude. In 1994 it was transferred to 63 degrees west in inclined orbit, where it remained until the middle of June 1996, when it was moved to 79 degrees west in inclined orbit, where it remained until August 1998 in January 1999 it went to 144 degrees west in inclined orbit, the Brasilsat A1 remained in this position until March 2002 when it left of service and was sent to the graveyard orbit.

Its replacement in the orbital position of 65 degrees west to continue with the telecommunications transmissions, was the satellite Brasilsat B2, that was released in 1995.

== Release ==
The satellite was successfully launched into space on February 8, 1985, at 23:22:00 UTC by means of an Ariane 3 vehicle launched from the Kourou Space Center in French Guiana along with the Arabsat-1A. It had a launch mass of 1,195 kg (2,635 lb).

=== Capacity and coverage ===
Brasilsat A1 was equipped with 24 transponders in C-band (plus 6 spare) to provide telecommunications services to Brazil.
