= AMC-12 (satellite) =

- Names: GE-1i; AMC-12 (2005-present); WorldSat 2 Star One C12 (2005-present); NSS 10 (2009-2011)
- Mission type: Communications
- Operator: SES Americom (2005-2009); SES World Skies (2009-2011); SES S.A. (2011-present)
- COSPAR ID: 2005-003A
- SATCAT no.: 28526
- Mission duration: 16 years (planned); 20 years, 19 days (elapsed)

Spacecraft properties
- Spacecraft: GE-1i
- Spacecraft type: Spacebus 4000
- Bus: Spacebus 4000C3
- Manufacturer: Alcatel Space
- Launch mass: 4,979 kg (10,977 lb)

Start of mission
- Launch date: 3 February 2005, 02:27:32 UTC
- Rocket: Proton-M / Briz-M
- Launch site: Baikonur Cosmodrome, Site 81/24
- Contractor: Khrunichev State Research and Production Space Center
- Entered service: April 2005

Orbital parameters
- Reference system: Geocentric orbit
- Regime: Geostationary orbit
- Longitude: 37° West

Transponders
- Band: 72 C-band
- Coverage area: North America, South America, Europe, Africa

AMC-12 (formerly GE-1i) is an American geostationary communications satellite that was launched by a Proton-M / Briz-M launch vehicle at 02:27:32 UTC on 3 February 2005. The 4,979 kg (10,977 lb) satellite to provide voice and video services to the North America and South America, Europe, and Africa through separate beams to each region, after parking over the Atlantic Ocean through its 72 C-band transponders, over 37° West longitude.

== Worldsat 2 ==
In early 2004, AMC 12 was transferred to Worldsat LLC, a new subsidiary of SES Americom as Worldsat 2. In early 2005, few weeks before launch, it was renamed AMC 12 again.

== Astra 4A ==
24 transponders on AMC 12 have been contracted by SES Astra which to market this capacity in Africa under the name Astra 4A.

== Star One C12 ==
18 transponders are operated by Star One as Star One C12 for Europe.

== NSS 10 ==
In March 2009, the satellite was transferred to SES New Skies and named NSS 10.

== AMC-13 ==
AMC-13 (formerly GE-2i) was cancelled.
