= Star One C3 =

Communications satellite

- Mission type: Communication
- Operator: Star One
- COSPAR ID: 2012-062A
- SATCAT no.: 38991
- Mission duration: 15 years (planned)

Spacecraft properties
- Bus: STAR-2
- Manufacturer: Orbital Sciences Corporation
- Launch mass: 3,227 kilograms (7,114 lb)

Start of mission
- Launch date: 10 November 2012, 21:05 UTC
- Rocket: Ariane 5ECA
- Launch site: Kourou ELA-3
- Contractor: Arianespace

Orbital parameters
- Reference system: Geocentric
- Regime: Geostationary
- Longitude: 75° and 84° west
- Semi-major axis: 42,164.0 kilometres (26,199.5 mi)
- Perigee altitude: 35,787.6 kilometres (22,237.4 mi)
- Apogee altitude: 35,799.5 kilometres (22,244.8 mi)
- Period: 1,436.1 minutes

Transponders
- Band: 28 IEEE C-band (NATO G/H-band); 16 IEEE K_{u} band (NATO J-band)

Star One C3 is a communications satellite operated by Star One, a subsidiary of Embratel. It was built by Orbital Sciences Corporation based on the STAR-2 satellite bus, and was launched on 10 November 2012 21:05 UTC by an Ariane 5ECA carrier rocket, as part of a dual-payload launch with Eutelsat 21B.

Star One C3 will replace Brasilsat B3 in the 75° W position. The launch mass was 3226.6 kg.

== See also ==
- Star One (satellite operator)
- Star One C1
- Star One C2
