= Star One C1 =

Brazilian communications satellite

- Mission type: Communications
- Operator: Star One
- COSPAR ID: 2007-056A
- SATCAT no.: 32293
- Mission duration: 15 years

Spacecraft properties
- Bus: Spacebus-3000B3
- Manufacturer: Thales Alenia Space
- Launch mass: 4,100 kilograms (9,000 lb)
- Dry mass: 1,754 kilograms (3,867 lb)
- Dimensions: 5.3 x 3.3 x 2.5 m
- Power: 10,5 kW

Start of mission
- Launch date: 14 November 2007, 22:06 UTC
- Rocket: Ariane 5ECA
- Launch site: Kourou ELA-3
- Contractor: Arianespace

Orbital parameters
- Reference system: Geocentric
- Regime: Geostationary
- Longitude: 65° west
- Semi-major axis: 42,241.0 kilometers (26,247.3 mi)
- Perigee altitude: 35,860.5 kilometers (22,282.7 mi)
- Apogee altitude: 35,879.7 kilometers (22,294.6 mi)
- Period: 1,440.0 minutes

Transponders
- Band: 28 IEEE C-band (NATO G/H-band); 16 IEEE K_{u} band (NATO J-band); 1 IEEE X-band (NATO H/I/J-band)

Star One C1 is a Brazilian communications satellite. It was launched on 14 November 2007 by an Ariane 5ECA carrier rocket, as part of a dual-payload launch with Skynet 5B. It was built by Thales Alenia Space, based on the Spacebus-3000B3 satellite bus. It is operated by Star One, a subsidiary of Embratel.

== Overview ==
It was launched atop an Ariane 5-ECA rocket at 22:06 UTC on November 14, 2007. This launch had previously been delayed from November 9 due to a problem with the rocket, and then from November 12 due to a problem with the launch pad. Star One C1 was built by Thales Alenia Space based on a Spacebus 3000 B3 platform. It has 28 C-band transponders, 14 Ku-band transponders and one X-band transponder, and weighed about 4,100 kilograms (9,000 lb) at launch.

== See also ==
- Star One (satellite operator)
- Star One C2
- Star One C3
