= Spar Aerospace =

Canadian aerospace company

SPAR Aerospace was a Canadian aerospace company. It produced equipment for the Canadian Space Agency to be used in cooperation with NASA's Space Shuttle program, most notably the Canadarm, a remote manipulator system.

The company went through a series of changes through mergers and acquisition activities, and is now part of MDA.

== History ==
The company was originally formed in 1967 in Brampton, Ontario through a management buyout of de Havilland Canada's Special Products division and Avro Canada's Applied Research unit. This provided the name Special Products and Applied Research, or SPAR for short. Special Products was best known for the construction of the Alouette 1 satellite, which made Canada the fourth spacefaring nation. The company was initially involved in spacecraft applications. Larry Clarke led the formation of the company and was its first president.

Spar were early innovators in electro-optics, receiving funding from the US Navy in the late 1960s for an infrared electronic warfare system in Toronto. This later lead to their selection as one of the lead contractors with General Electric for the development of the AN/SAR-8 Infrared Search and Target Designation System for the US Navy and Royal Canadian Navy in 1976, leading the project until its cancellation in 1992.

As part of the Space Shuttle program, the National Research Council of Canada agreed to take on the task of building a robot arm to equip the shuttles as Canada's contribution to the effort. SPAR was selected to build the system, which became known as the Canadarm. This also led to their successful 1992 bid on the Canadarm2 for the International Space Station. The company was also the prime contractor on a number of satellites, including Anik-E, Olympus 1s (L-SAT), and RADARSAT-1. However, through the 1990s the space industry underwent a period of intense consolidation and SPAR was largely locked out of the market. Further sales were not forthcoming, and the company sold the space division to Orbital Sciences in 1999, who sold it in turn to MacDonald, Dettwiler and Associates in 2001 to become MD Robotics, and then again to Allianz Technosystems in 2008.

In 1992, SPAR purchased the U.S. company ComStream, which made compression systems for telecommunications and satellites in particular. This led to massive losses in 1996 due to the division's underperformance. Their major customer, Thomson Consumer Electronics, had been waiting for ComStream to deliver a decoding chip for their direct broadcast satellite receivers, but they introduced their own designs and ComStream lost the contract. SPAR sold the division to Radyne in 1998, taking a loss of about $13 million on the purchase and sale alone.

In 1997, seeking a path to diversification, SPAR purchased CAE Aviation's aircraft maintenance operations, in Edmonton, formerly Northwest Industries. CAE Aviation had maintained the Canadian Air Force's CC-130 Hercules aircraft for several decades, including performing of the Centre Wing and Outer Wing replacement programs, Progressive Structural Inspection (PSI) program, Tanker program, Avionics Upgrade Program (AUP) and Hercules Airframe and Wiring System Refurbishment (HAWSR) programs. They also handled the complete overhaul of the Royal New Zealand Air Force's 40-year-old Lockheed C-130 Hercules aircraft. Other customers included the Royal Norwegian Air Force, United States Coast Guard, and Greece's Hellenic Air Force. SPAR performed several avionics upgrades and a Depot Level Inspection and Repair (DLIR) for the Royal Canadian Air Force CL-41 Tutor aircraft flown by the Snowbirds acrobatic team.

The robotics division was sold in 1999 and became part of MacDonald, Dettwiler and Associates as MD Robotics, a subsidiary of its MDA Space Missions division. As part of MDA, it developed the Mobile Servicing System for the International Space Station, which includes the Space Station Remote Manipulator System, also known as Canadarm2.

In 2001, a majority stake in the remaining operations was purchased by L-3 Communications. L-3 managed SPAR Aerospace for years, but L-3 didn't invest in or expand the business. In 2003, it acquired Bombardier Inc.'s Military Aviation Services. In 2005, L-3 Communications SPAR Aerospace lost the DND contract to maintain CC-130E/H aircraft and SPAR had to lay off hundreds of employees. SPAR's Edmonton facilities and workforce (both the City Centre and the International Airport locations) were permanently shut down at the end of summer 2009, after over four decades of production and service. Other facilities, including Trenton, remain in use.

== Facilities ==
- Mississauga, Ontario
- Trenton, Ontario
- Venice, Italy
- Montreal, Quebec

== See also ==
- Bombardier Aerospace
- COM DEV International
- CMC Electronics
- Héroux-Devtek
- MacDonald, Dettwiler and Associates
- Viking Air
