= Star One C2 =

Brazilian communications satellite

- Mission type: Communication
- Operator: Star One
- COSPAR ID: 2008-018B
- SATCAT no.: 32768
- Mission duration: 15 years (planned)

Spacecraft properties
- Bus: Spacebus-3000B3
- Manufacturer: Thales Alenia Space
- Launch mass: 4,100 kilograms (9,000 lb)

Start of mission
- Launch date: 18 April 2008, 22:17 UTC
- Rocket: Ariane 5ECA
- Launch site: Kourou ELA-3
- Contractor: Arianespace

Orbital parameters
- Reference system: Geocentric
- Regime: Geostationary
- Semi-major axis: 42,164.0 kilometers (26,199.5 mi)
- Perigee altitude: 35,782.8 kilometers (22,234.4 mi)
- Apogee altitude: 35,804.4 kilometers (22,247.8 mi)
- Period: 1,436.1 minutes

Transponders
- Band: 28 IEEE C-band (NATO G/H-band); 16 IEEE K_{u} band (NATO J-band); 1 IEEE X-band (NATO H/I/J-band)
- Coverage area: South America, Mexico and Florida (USA)

Star One C2 is a Brazilian communications satellite. It was launched on 18 April 2008 22:17 UTC by an Ariane 5ECA carrier rocket, as part of a dual-payload launch with Vinasat-1. It was built by Thales Alenia Space, based on the Spacebus-3000B3 satellite bus. It is operated by Star One, a subsidiary of Embratel, and Bolivarsat.

== Overview ==
On June 2, 2008, Star One C2 replaced BrasilSat B4 in the task of broadcasting the main Brazilian TV network channels. This position, at 70.0° W, had been once occupied by Brasilsat B1.

Since December 2008, Star One C2 transmits the Claro TV pay TV package. The service is supplied by Embratel and Claro companies, and operates in K_{u} band.

== See also ==
- Star One (satellite operator)
- Star One C1
- Star One C3
