= Brasilsat B1 =

Brazilian communications satellite

- Mission type: Telecommunications
- Operator: Embratel
- COSPAR ID: 1994-049A
- SATCAT no.: 23199
- Mission duration: 12 years

Spacecraft properties
- Bus: HS-376
- Manufacturer: Hughes
- Launch mass: 1,760 kilograms (3,880 lb)
- Power: 1,650 watts

Start of mission
- Launch date: August 10, 1994 at 23:05:00 UTC
- Rocket: Ariane 44 LP V66
- Launch site: Kourou ELA-2
- Contractor: Arianespace

Orbital parameters
- Reference system: Geocentric
- Regime: Geostationary
- Longitude: (first position): 70° West (current position): 68° West
- Perigee altitude: 36,044.8 kilometres (22,397.2 mi)
- Apogee altitude: 36,118.9 kilometres (22,443.2 mi)
- Inclination: 5.7 degrees
- Period: 1,450 minutes

Transponders
- Frequency: 3625 - 4200 MHz

Brasilsat B1 is a Brazilian communications satellite launched on August 10, 1994, by an Ariane rocket model 44LP at Guiana Space Centre which is located in Kourou, French Guiana.

== History ==
It was constructed by the United States and Brazil and is classified as a second generation satellite. It is larger and more powerful than the previous generation of satellites.

The Boeing Company (which chose to expand its presence in another aerospace field of satellite communications by purchasing Hughes Electronics Corporation, the builder of Brasilsat B1 and B2) contracted the acquisition of three satellites from Hughes. As part of the contract, Hughes would divide the work with Promon Engenharia SA of São Paulo. Brasilsat B1 and B2 were tested by the Institute of Space Research - INPE of São José dos Campos, Brasilsat B3 and B4 were tested in the Hughes laboratories.

The contract also included renovation of sensor equipment and telemetry, provided by Guaratiba Center for Satellite Signaling, located in Rio de Janeiro, as well as automation and installation of security equipment in the Tanguá Control Station.

== Current status ==
In March 2007, Brasilsat B1 was moved from its former orbital position at 70.0°W to 68.0°W and replaced by Brasilsat B4. On June 2, 2008 Brasilsat B4 was moved from its new position to 84.0°W and replaced at 70.0°W by Star One C2. Brasilsat B3 is currently at 75.0°W.

Of the four Brasilsat satellites, only B3 is still transmitting signals as of July 2021. B4 was retired in June 2021.

== Main characteristics ==
- Original orbital position: 70.0° W
- Current orbital position: 68.0°W (Inactive)
- Coverage: Brazil
- Transponders: 28 C-band
- Downlink frequencies: 5850–6425 MHz
- Uplink frequency: 3625 – 4200 MHz
- Launch date: August 10, 1994
- Model: Hughes HS 376 W
- Launch location/vehicle: Arianespace / Ariane 44 LP
- Planned life of satellite: 12 years
