= Brasilsat B2 =

Brazilian communications satellite

- Mission type: Communications
- Operator: Embratel
- COSPAR ID: 1995-016A
- SATCAT no.: 23536
- Mission duration: 12 years (planned)

Spacecraft properties
- Bus: HS-376
- Manufacturer: Hughes
- Launch mass: 1,757 kg (3,874 lb)
- Dry mass: 1,052 kg (2,319 lb)

Start of mission
- Launch date: 28 March 1995, 23:14:19 UTC
- Rocket: Ariane 44LP H10+ (V71)
- Launch site: Crentre Spatial Guyanais, ELA-2
- Contractor: Arianespace

End of mission
- Last contact: Retired

Orbital parameters
- Reference system: Geocentric orbit
- Regime: Geostationary orbit
- Longitude: Current position: 63.1° West; First position: 65° West

Transponders
- Band: 29 transponders: 28 C-band; 1 X-band
- Coverage area: Brazil

Brasilsat B2 is a Brazilian communications satellite launched on 28 March 1995, at 23:14:19 UTC, by an Ariane 44LP H10+ launch vehicle at Kourou in French Guiana.

== History ==
The Boeing Company contracted the acquisition of three satellites from Hughes Electronics Corporation. As part of the contract, Hughes would divide the work with Promon Engenharia SA of São Paulo. Brasilsat B1 and B2 were tested by the National Institute for Space Research (INPE) of São José dos Campos, Brasilsat B3 and B4 were tested in the Hughes laboratories. The contract also included renovation of sensor equipment and telemetry, provided by Guaratiba Center for Satellite Signaling, located in Rio de Janeiro, as well as automation and installation of security equipment in the Tanguá Control Station.

== Current status ==
In January 2008, Brasilsat B2 was moved from its former orbital position at 65° West to 92° West. Brasilsat B2 is now in inclined orbit at 63° West.

Of the four Brasilsat satellites, only Brasilsat B3 and Brasilsat B4 are currently(?) transmitting signals.

== Main characteristics ==
- Original orbital position: 65° West
- Current orbital position: 63.1° West (inactive)
- Coverage: Brazil
- Transponders: 28 C-band, 1 X-band
- Launch date: 28 March 1995
- Model: Hughes HS-376W
- Launch location/vehicle: Centre Spatial Guyanais / Ariane 44LP
- Planned life of satellite: 12 years
