= Galaxy (satellite) =

Family of communications satellites operated by Intelsat

- Manufacturer: Hughes Aircraft Company, Boeing Satellite Systems, Orbital Sciences Corporation, Space Systems/Loral, Alcatel Alenia, Northrop Grumman
- Country of origin: United States
- Operator: INTELSAT
- Applications: Communications

Specifications
- Bus: HS-376, HS-601, BSS-702, STAR-2, SSL 1300, GEOStar-3
- Regime: Geostationary orbit

Production
- Status: In service
- Launched: 39
- Operational: 21
- Retired: 14
- Failed: 3
- Maiden launch: 28 June 1983
- Last launch: 3 August 2023

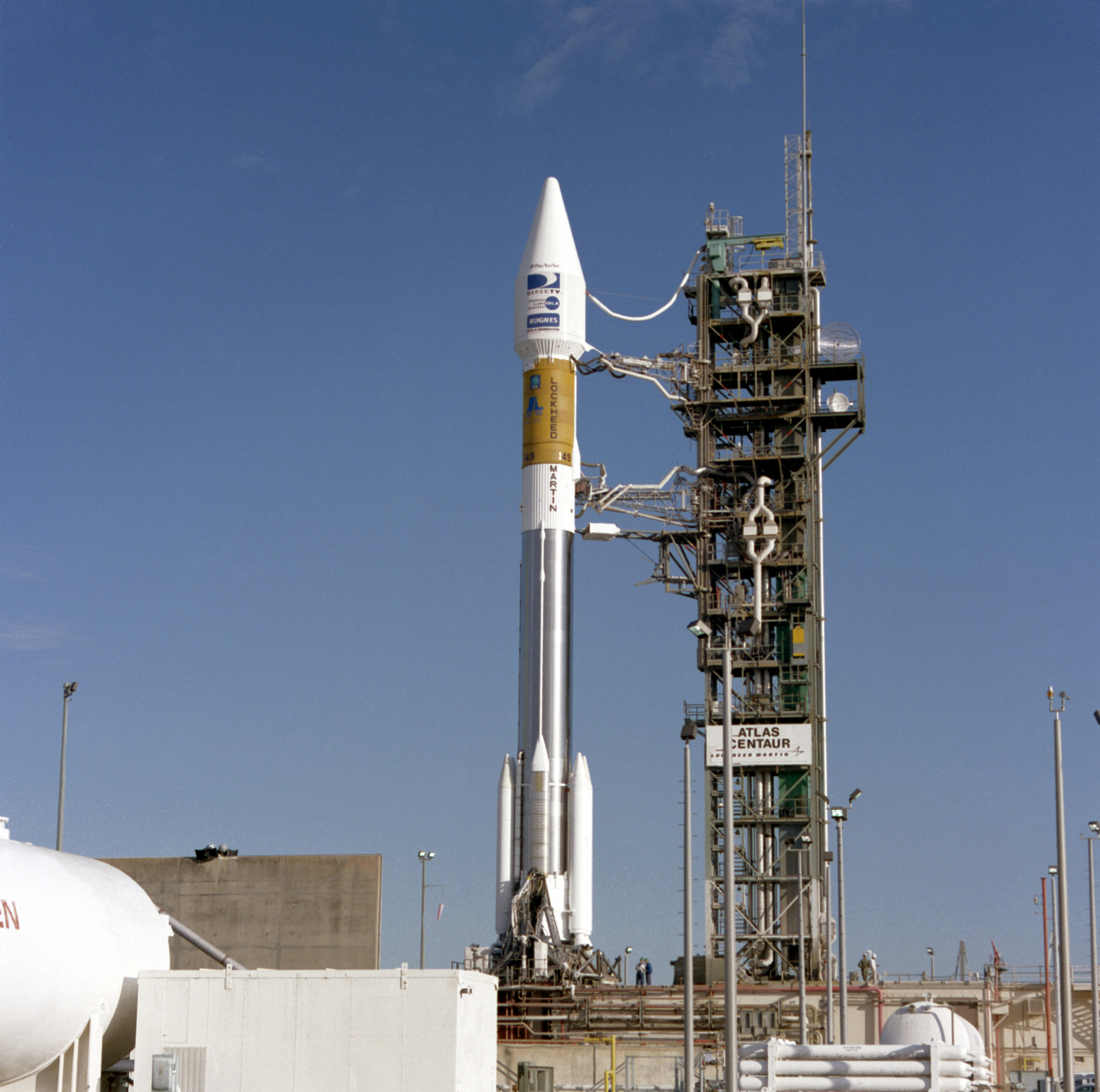
Galaxy VIII-I satellite

The Galaxy series is a family of communications satellites originally developed and operated by Hughes Communications. It has since merged with PanAmSat and is owned and operated by Intelsat. As one of the earliest geostationary satellites, Galaxy 1 was launched on 28 June 1983. The latest one, Galaxy 37, was launched on 3 August 2023.

Satellite	Manufacturer	Launch Vehicle	Launch Date	Launch site	State	Orbital position	Notes
Galaxy 1	Hughes Aircraft Company	Delta (3920)	28 June 1983	Cape Canaveral, LC-17B	Retired on 1 May 1994	141.0° West	
Galaxy 1R	Hughes Aircraft Company	Atlas I	22 August 1992	Cape Canaveral, LC-36B	Launch failure	—N/a	
Galaxy 1R2	Hughes Aircraft Company	Delta II (7925-8)	19 February 1994	Cape Canaveral, LC-17B	Retired on 7 March 2006	105.0° West	Also called Galaxy 1RR
Galaxy 2	Hughes Aircraft Company	Delta (3920)	22 September 1983	Cape Canaveral, LC-17A	Retired in May 1994	43.0° West	
Galaxy 3	Hughes Aircraft Company	Delta (3920)	21 September 1984	Cape Canaveral, LC-17B	Retired in October 1995	38.0° West	
Galaxy 3R	Hughes Aircraft Company	Atlas 2A	15 December 1995	Cape Canaveral, LC-36A	Failed in orbit in March 2006	129.0° West	
Galaxy 3C	Hughes Aircraft Company	Zenit-3SL	15 June 2002	Sea Launch	Active	95.0° West	
Galaxy 4	Hughes Aircraft Company	Ariane 42P+	25 June 1993	Kourou, ELA-2	Failed in orbit in May 1998	78.0° East	
Galaxy 4R	Hughes Aircraft Company	Ariane 42L	19 April 2000	Kourou, ELA-2	Retired in July 2006	164.0° East	
Galaxy 5	Hughes Aircraft Company	Atlas I	14 March 1992	Cape Canaveral, LC-36B	Retired in January 2005	176.0° East	
Galaxy 6	Hughes Aircraft Company	Ariane 4L	12 October 1990	Kourou, ELA-2	Retired in February 2003	145.0° West	
Galaxy 7	Hughes Aircraft Company	Ariane 42P+	28 October 1992	Kourou, ELA-2	Failure in orbit in November 2000	96.0° West	
Galaxy 8i	Hughes Aircraft Company	Atlas 2AS	8 December 1997	Cape Canaveral, LC-36B	Retired in October 2002	30.0° East	
Galaxy 8iR	Hughes Aircraft Company	Zenit-3SL	—N/a	—N/a	—N/a	—N/a	Cancelled
Galaxy 9	Hughes Aircraft Company	Delta II (7925)	23 May 1996	Cape Canaveral, LC-17B	Retired	176.0° West	
Galaxy 10	Hughes Aircraft Company	Delta III 8930	27 August 1998	Cape Canaveral, LC-17B	Launch failure	—N/a	
Galaxy 10R	Hughes Aircraft Company	Ariane 42L	25 January 2000	Kourou, ELA-2	Retired in June 2008	175.0° West	
Galaxy 11	Hughes Aircraft Company	Ariane 44L	22 December 1999	Kourou, ELA-2	Active	44.0° East	
Galaxy 12	Orbital Sciences Corporation	Ariane 5 G	9 April 2003	Kourou, ELA-3	Active	129.0° West	With INSAT-3A
Galaxy 13	Hughes Aircraft Company	Zenit-3SL	1 October 2003	Sea Launch	Active	127.0° West	Horizons-1
Galaxy 14	Orbital Sciences Corporation	Soyuz-FG	13 August 2005	Baikonur, Site 31/6	Active	125.0° West	
Galaxy 15	Orbital Sciences Corporation	Ariane 5 GS	13 October 2005	Kourou, ELA-3	Active (failure in orbit in April 2010, resolved in 2011)	133.0° West	Launched join with Syracuse 3A
Galaxy 16	Space Systems/Loral	Zenit-3SL	18 June 2006	Sea Launch	Active	99.0° West	
Galaxy 17	Alcatel Alenia Space	Ariane 5 ECA	4 May 2007	Kourou, ELA-3	Active	91.0° West	Launched with Astra 1L
Galaxy 18	Space Systems/Loral	Zenit-3SL	21 May 2008	Sea Launch	Active	123.0° West	
Galaxy 19	Space Systems/Loral	Zenit-3SL	24 September 2008	Sea Launch	Active	97.0° West	Ex-Intelsat Americas 9 (IA 9)
Galaxy 23	Space Systems/Loral	Zenit-3SL	8 August 2003	Sea Launch	Active	121.0° West	Ex-Telstar 13
Galaxy 25	Space Systems/Loral	Proton-K	24 May 1997	Baikonur, Site 81/23	Active	93.0° West	Ex-Telstar 5
Galaxy 26	Space Systems/Loral	Proton-K	15 February 1999	Baikonur, Site 81/23	Retired on 7 June 2014	31.0° West	Ex-Telstar 6
Galaxy 27	Space Systems/Loral	Ariane 4	25 September 1999	Kourou, ELA-2	Active	109.0° East	Ex-Telstar 7
Galaxy 28	Space Systems/Loral	Zenit-3SL	23 June 2005	Sea Launch, Pacific Ocean	Active	89.0° West	Ex-Intelsat Americas 8 (IA 8)
Galaxy 30	Northrop Grumman	Ariane 5 ECA	15 August 2020	Kourou, ELA-3	Active	125.0° West	Launched with MEV-2 and BSAT-4b
Galaxy 31	Maxar Technologies	Falcon 9 Block 5	12 November 2022	Cape Canaveral, SLC-40	Active	121.0° West	Launched with Galaxy 32
Galaxy 32	Maxar Technologies	Falcon 9 Block 5	12 November 2022	Cape Canaveral, SLC-40	Active	91.0° West	Launched with Galaxy 31
Galaxy 33	Northrop Grumman	Falcon 9 Block 5	8 October 2022	Cape Canaveral, SLC-40	Active	133.0° West	Launched with Galaxy 34
Galaxy 34	Northrop Grumman	Falcon 9 Block 5	8 October 2022	Cape Canaveral, SLC-40	Active	129.0° West	Launched with Galaxy 33
Galaxy 35	Maxar Technologies	Ariane 5 ECA	13 December 2022	Kourou, ELA-3	Active	95.0° West	Launched with Galaxy 36 and MTG-I1
Galaxy 36	Maxar Technologies	Ariane 5 ECA	13 December 2022	Kourou, ELA-3	Active	89.0° West	Launched with Galaxy 35 and MTG-I1
Galaxy 37	Maxar Technologies	Falcon 9 Block 5	3 August 2023	Cape Canaveral, SLC-40	Active	127.0° West	Also known as Horizons-4

== External sources ==
- Program: Galaxy. Objective: Communications. Overview: Television broadcast satellite at archive.org
