= SES-7 =

Telecommunications satellite

- Names: ProtoStar-2; ProtoStar-II; IndoStar-2; Cakrawarta-2; Galaxy-8iR
- Mission type: Communications
- Operator: SES World Skies (2009-2011); SES (2011-present)
- COSPAR ID: 2009-027A
- SATCAT no.: 34941
- Website: https://www.ses.com/
- Mission duration: 15 years (planned); 15 years, 9 months, 18 days (elapsed)

Spacecraft properties
- Spacecraft type: Boeing 601
- Bus: BSS-601HP
- Manufacturer: Boeing Satellite Systems
- Launch mass: 3,905 kg (8,609 lb)
- Dry mass: 3,087 kg (6,806 lb)

Start of mission
- Launch date: 16 May 2009, 00:57:38 UTC
- Rocket: Proton-M / Briz-M
- Launch site: Baikonur, Site 200/39
- Contractor: Khrunichev State Research and Production Space Center
- Entered service: July 2009

Orbital parameters
- Reference system: Geocentric orbit
- Regime: Geostationary orbit
- Longitude: 108° East

Transponders
- Band: 32 (+8 spares) transponders: 22 (+5) Ku-band; 10 (+3) S-band / X-band
- Bandwidth: 36 MHz
- Coverage area: Indonesia, India, Taiwan, Philippines, Southeast Asia

SES-7 (also formerly known as ProtoStar-2 / Indostar-2) is a commercial communications satellite operated by SES World Skies (now SES).

== Spacecraft ==
ProtoStar-2 is a geosynchronous communications satellite built by Boeing. It is a BSS-601HP satellite bus. On 15 November 2002, PanAmSat terminated its contract with Boeing Satellite Systems (BSS) for the almost-completed Galaxy-8iR satellite, claiming that Boeing had defaulted on the terms of the contract, and requested US$72 million from Boeing to refund prior advance payments and other costs. The satellite was later converted into the ProtoStar-2 satellite, which was launched in May 2009. Late 2009, it is purchased through auction by SES for SES World Skies unit for US$180 million. The satellite was renamed SES-7 in May 2010.

== Launch ==
Launched on 16 May 2009 at 00:57:38 UTC, since Baikonur Cosmodrome, Site 200/39 for ProtoStar Ltd by Proton-M / Briz-M launch vehicle. Launch arranged by International Launch Services (ILS).

== Market ==
It is positioned at 108.2° East longitude and serves customers in Indonesia, India, Taiwan, the Philippines, and Southeast Asia. Protostar 2 carries 10 (+3) S-band and 22 (+5) Ku-band transponders for optimized HD satellite television direct-to-home (DTH) satellite television service and broadband Internet access across the Asia-Pacific region. The S-band payload is operated under the name of IndoStar-2 (Cakrawarta-2).

== See also ==
- "Indostar 2 / ProtoStar 2 → SES 7". Gunter's Space Page. 11 December 2017.
- "Boeing Awarded Contract for Direct-to-Home Entertainment Satellite". Boeing. 14 January 2008. Archived from the original on 24 May 2011.
- "SES 7 Home Page". SES.
