= HS-393 =

Communications satellite bus

Boeing 393
- Manufacturer: Boeing Satellite Development Center
- Country of origin: United States
- Applications: Communications satellite

Specifications
- Spacecraft type: Spin-stabilized
- Launch mass: 2.2 to 2.5 t (2.4 to 2.8 tons)
- Dimensions: Diameter: 3.7 m (12 ft); Height (stowed): 3.4 m (11 ft); Height (deployed): 10 m (33 ft)
- Power: 2 to 2.2 kWatts
- Batteries: 2 × 38Ah NiH_{2} batteries
- Regime: Geostationary orbit
- Design life: 8 years

Production
- Status: Retired
- On order: 3
- Built: 3
- Launched: 3
- Retired: 3
- Maiden launch: JCSAT-1 March 6, 1989
- Last launch: SBS 6, October 12, 1990

Related spacecraft
- Derived from: HS-376

The Hughes 393 (sometimes referred to as the HS-393) is a communications satellite bus introduced in 1985 by Hughes Space and Communications Company. It was a spin-stabilized bus that had twice as much power as the HS-376 platform.

== Design ==
The satellite bus was designed and manufactured by Hughes. It had a launch mass of 2.2 to 2.5 t (2.4 to 2.8 tons), a mass of 1.35 to 1.5 t (1.49 to 1.65 tons) after reaching geostationary orbit, and an 8-year design life. When stowed for launch, its dimensions were 3.4 m (11 ft) in height and 3.7 m (12 ft) in diameter. With its solar panels fully extended its height was 10 m (33 ft).

Its power system generated approximately 2,350 watts of power at beginning of life and 2,200 at end of life, thanks to two cylindrical solar panels. These panels used K7 and K4-3/4 solar cells, with more than twice the number of cells than on the HS-376. The bottom panel was retracted around the body and top panel for launch, and extended downwards for operation. It also had two 38 Ah NiH_{2} batteries.

Its propulsion system was composed of two R-4D liquid apogee engines with a thrust of 490 N (110 lb_{f}). It also had two axial and four radial 22 N (4.9 lb_{f}) bipropellant thrusters for station-keeping and attitude control. It included enough propellant for orbit circularization and 8 years of operation.

Its payload was composed of a 2.4 m (7 ft 10 in) antenna that fed K_{u} band transponders.

== Satellites ==
The HS-393 was a more powerful platform than the HS-376, being able to supply 2,200 kW of power versus the 1,400 kW of the HS-376HP. Only three were ever built.

Satellite	Other Names	Operator	Model	Ordered	Launch	Launch Vehicle	Launch Result	Mass at launch (kg)	Mass at BOL (kg)	Remarks
JCSAT-1		JSAT Corporation	HS-393	1985	1989-03-06	Ariane 44LP	Success	2,280 kg (5,030 lb)	1,346 kg (2,967 lb)	First Japanese commercial satellite.
JCSAT-2		JSAT Corporation	HS-393	1985	1990-01-01	Commercial Titan III	Success	2,280 kg (5,030 lb)	1,346 kg (2,967 lb)	
SBS 6		Satellite Business Systems	HS-393	1985	1990-10-12	Ariane 44L	Success	2,478 kg (5,463 lb)	1,500 kg (3,300 lb)	Launched alongside Galaxy 6.

== See also ==
- Boeing 601
- Boeing Satellite Development Center
