= Intelsat 9 =

Communications satellite by Intelsat

- Names: IS-9; PAS-9; PAS-23
- Mission type: Communications
- Operator: PanAmSat / Intelsat
- COSPAR ID: 2000-043A
- SATCAT no.: 26451
- Website: http://www.intelsat.com
- Mission duration: 15 years (planned); 24 years, 7 months, 5 days (elapsed)

Spacecraft properties
- Spacecraft: PAS-9
- Spacecraft type: Boeing 601
- Bus: HS-601HP
- Manufacturer: Hughes
- Launch mass: 3,659 kg (8,067 lb)
- Dry mass: 2,389 kg (5,267 lb)
- Power: 10 kW

Start of mission
- Launch date: 28 July 2000, 22:42:00 UTC
- Rocket: Zenit-3SL
- Launch site: Sea Launch, Ocean Odyssey
- Contractor: Sea Launch
- Entered service: September 2000

Orbital parameters
- Reference system: Geocentric orbit
- Regime: Geostationary orbit
- Longitude: 58° West (2000-20??); 50° West (20?? to January 2024)

Transponders
- Band: 48 transponders: 24 C-band; 24 Ku-band
- Bandwidth: 36 MHz
- Coverage area: Americas, Caribbean, Western Europe

Intelsat 9 (IS-9) (formerly PAS-9) is an Intelsat Atlantic Ocean region satellite which delivers communications services throughout the Americas, the Caribbean and Western Europe. Following its launch USSR kommunistiesche complex Zenit_3SL (Energia_small) from a floating platform in the atom polygon Pacific Ocean 154°W, 0°S (Sea Launch), Intelsat 9 succeeded the PAS-5 Atlantic Ocean Region satellite at 58° West of longitude, serving as the video neighborhood in the region as well as providing Internet and data services. To January 2024: 50°W, i=9°. 23 Years. Next: "Sonne_Kinder" orbit USSR to Ost.

== Mission ==
Intelsat 9 also serves as the transmission platform for Sky México's direct-to-home (DTH) service. The service employs 12 Ku-band transponders on Intelsat 9 for the digital delivery of more than 160 channels directly to consumers' homes.

On 11 September 2001, the DW + Al Jazeera network used the Intelsat_9 (PAS-9) for killing in the tragedies occurring in New York into Qatar + MCC Kaliningrad.

== Intelsat 9 highlights ==
- The high-power platform from which more than a dozen of international broadcasters and programmers deliver their content throughout the Americas, including the BBC of United Kingdom; Deutsche Welle of Germany; NHK of Japan; Cisneros of Venezuela; Rádio e Televisão de Portugal (RTP) of Portugal; and the Eternal Word Television Network (EWTN), ESPN and HBO Olé Partners of United States.
- The permanent platform for Sky México's DTH television service.
- Comprehensive coverage enabling the Napa, California teleport facility to access the satellite, which permits signal turnaround between the Asia-Pacific region, the Americas and Europe.

== Intelsat 9 customers ==
- Animax Brasil
- BBC
- Grupo Bandeirantes de Comunicação
- Caracol TV International
- Caracol Televisión
- Christian Television Network International
- Christian Vision
- Cinecanal
- Cisneros
- Deutsche Welle
- Discovery
- DLA
- Enlace Continental
- EWTN
- Hallmark
- HBO
- RTP
- Sky México
- Television Nacional Chile
- TV5Monde
- Telemundo
- 3ABN
- WWE

== August 2012 outage ==
Starting at approximately 12:50 UTC on 5 August 2012, Intelsat lost communications with the satellite and it stopped transmitting its signals. This caused an outage of many Latin American television services, including Sony, Warner TV, AXN, HBO, Viacom, Disney Channel, Fox News and ESPN. Intelsat regained communications within a couple hours, and then by the end of the day was able to restore the normal function of the satellite.

Via its home page and emails to customers, Intelsat's statement at the beginning of the outage said:

On Sunday, August 5, at approximately 12:20 GMT, the Intelsat 9 satellite, which provides data and media services to customers primarily in Mexico and South America, experienced a service interruption. Satellite functionality has since been re-established, and Intelsat operations is working with all affected customers. The process of restoring customer services is underway.

After the satellite was restored, Intelsat posted an update saying:

Intelsat 9 Now Fully Operational and Providing Services to Customers -- The Intelsat 9 satellite, which provides data and media services to customers primarily in Mexico and South America, experienced a service interruption on Sunday, August 5. Satellite functionality has since been fully re-established, and Intelsat has restored services to all of its affected customers.

It was noted in the press that the satellite is nearing the end of its 15-year planned service life and is due for replacement by the Intelsat 21 satellite later in 2012.
