= PanAmSat =

American satellite company

PanAmSat Corporation
- Company type: Subsidiary
- Industry: Telecommunications
- Founded: 1984; 42 years ago
- Founder: Rene Anselmo
- Headquarters: Greenwich, Connecticut, United States
- Owner: Intelsat (2006–present)
- Website: https://www.intelsat.com/

PanAmSat Corporation was a satellite service provider headquartered in Greenwich, Connecticut, United States.

== History ==
Founded in 1984 by Reynold "Rene" Anselmo, it operated a fleet of communications satellites used by the entertainment industry, news agencies, internet service providers, government agencies, and telecommunication companies. Anselmo got the idea for PanAmSat from Norm Leventhal, a communications lawyer in Washington, D.C., to whom he had turned to for advice regarding difficulties he was encountering in getting reasonably priced satellite transmission for his Spanish International Network (SIN), the current-day Univision. Anselmo financed the entire project himself. Leventhal's law firm, with special satellite technical advice from Martin Rothblatt, filed for approval from the Federal Communications Commission (FCC), and lined up an initial satellite from RCA Astro-Electronics, with a heavily discounted launch from Arianespace.

PanAmSat effectively broke the monopoly on international satellite communications which was held by Intelsat, an international treaty-based organization founded and owned by several countries including the United States. PanAmSat, led by Anselmo, successfully lobbied the United States Congress to permit it to operate globally, competing against Intelsat. Univision would also gain a nationwide cable audience through PanAmSat's efforts, gaining a head start in Spanish-language television in the United States and remaining the #1 Spanish network to this day.

Following the death of Rene Anselmo in 1995, his widow Mary Anselmo controlled the company for a time. PanAmSat was sold to Hughes Electronics, a division of General Motors, in a US$3 billion cash and stock deal. The satellite operations continued to be under PanAmSat with Hughes being the majority shareholder. In May 1997, Hughes Communication Galaxy merged with PanAmSat, adding 9 more satellites to its fleet. In 2003, News Corporation purchased Hughes Electronic's PanAmSat division and on 24 April 2004 sold PanAmSat to a consortium of private equity firms in a leveraged buyout including Kohlberg Kravis Roberts & Co. (KKR), Carlyle Group and Providence Equity Partners for US$4.3 billion.

=== 2004 leveraged buyout ===
KKR led the 2004 leveraged buyout by purchasing a 44% stake in the company. Carlyle and Providence each invested 27%, with management representing the remainder of the equity. The consortium invested only US$550 million in equity, financing the remainder through bank loans and bonds. The transaction closed in August 2004. One month after the buyout, the company issued an additional US$250 million in discount notes used to pay the consortium dividends. Three months later, PanAmSat filed an initial public offering with the Securities and Exchange Commission (SEC).

In an ironic twist of fate, its private equity owners sold PanAmSat to its archrival Intelsat in August 2005 for a total of US$4.3 billion in a deal finally consummated in July 2006. At the time of its sale, PanAmSat was the world's leading carrier of TV channels. In combination with INTELSAT (which had also gone private under private equity ownership in 2001), the new company — called Intelsat — is the world's largest commercial satellite company, with 53 spacecraft serving over 200 countries, with nearly 1400 employees.

In March 2007, Forbes magazine estimated the net worth of Rene Anselmo's widow, Mary Anselmo at US$1 billion. Anselmo, 78, lives in Greenwich, Connecticut.

== Satellite fleet ==
Satellite	Manufacturer	Type	Launch vehicle	Launch date (UTC)	Status	Notes
SBS 1	Hughes	HS-376	Delta	1 November 1980	Retired January 1990	
SBS 2	Hughes	HS-376	Delta	1 September 1981	Retired September 1996	
SBS 3	Hughes	HS-376	Space Shuttle Columbia STS-5	11 November 1982	Retired June 1995	
Galaxy 1	Hughes	HS-376	Delta	1 June 1983	Retired 1 April 1994	
Galaxy 2	Hughes	HS-376	Delta	1 September 1983	Retired May 1994	
SBS 4	Hughes	HS-376	Space Shuttle Discovery STS-41-D	30 August 1984	Retired August 1999	
Galaxy 3	Hughes	HS-376	Delta	1 September 1984	Retired October 1995	
PAS-1	General Electric	GE-3000	Ariane 44LP (V22)	15 June 1988	Retired February 2001	
SBS 5	Hughes	HS-376	Ariane 3 (V25)	1 September 1988	Retired March 2000	
SBS 6	Hughes	HS-393	Ariane 44L (V39)	1 October 1990	Retired April 2009	
Galaxy 6	Hughes	HS-376	Ariane 44L	12 October 1990	Retired February 2003	
Galaxy 5	Hughes	HS-376	Atlas I	14 March 1992	Retired January 2005	
Galaxy 1R	Hughes	HS-376	Atlas I	22 August 1992	22 August 1992	Launch failure
Galaxy 7	Hughes	HS-601	Ariane 42P+ (V54)	28 October 1992	Failure on orbit November 2000	
Galaxy 4	Hughes	HS-601	Ariane 42P+ (V57)	1 June 1993	Failure on orbit May 1998	
Galaxy 1R	Hughes	HS-376	Delta II (7925-8)	19 February 1994	Retired 7 March 2006	
PAS 2	Hughes	HS-601	Ariane 44L (V65)	8 July 1994	Retired December 2008	Intelsat 2, (formerly PAS-2)
PAS 3	Hughes	HS-601	Ariane 42P (V70)	1 December 1994	1 December 1994	Launch failure
PAS 4	Hughes	HS-601	Ariane-42L H10-3	3 August 1995	Retired	
Galaxy 3R	Hughes	HS-601	Atlas IIA	1 December 1995	Failure on orbit March 2006	
PAS 3R	Hughes	HS-601	Ariane 44L (V82)	12 January 1996	Retired	Intelsat 3R (formerly PAS-3R)
Galaxy 9	Hughes	HS-376	Delta II (7925)	12 June 1996	Retired	
PAS 6	Space Systems / Loral	LS-1300	Ariane 44P	8 August 1997	Failure on orbit April 2004	
PAS 5	Hughes	HS-601HP	Proton-K	27 August 1997	Active	
Galaxy 8i	Hughes	HS-601HP	Atlas IIAS	8 December 1997	Retired October 2002	
Galaxy 10	Hughes	HS-601HP	Delta III	26 August 1998	Launch failure 26 August 1998	Launch failure
PAS 7	Space Systems / Loral	LS-1300	Ariane 44LP	15 September 1998	Retired	
PAS 8	Space Systems / Loral	LS-1300	Proton-K	4 November 1998	Retired December 2016	
PAS 6B	Hughes	HS-601HP	Ariane 42L	21 December 1998	Active	
Galaxy 11	Hughes	HS-702	Ariane 44L	21 December 1999	Active	
Galaxy 10R	Hughes	HS-6016P	Ariane 42L	24 January 2000	Retired May 2008	
Galaxy 4R	Hughes	HS-601HP	Ariane 42L	18 April 2000	Retired July 2006	
PAS 9	Hughes	HS-601HP	Sea Launch, Zenit-3SL	28 July 2000	Active	
PAS 12	Space Systems / Loral	LS-1300	Ariane 44LP	29 October 2000	Active	Previously Europe * Star 1 → PAS 12 → Intelsat 12
PAS 1R	Hughes	HS-702	Ariane 5G	15 November 2000	Retired 2016	
PAS 10	Hughes	HS-601HP	Proton	15 May 2001	Active	
Galaxy 3C	Hughes	HS-702	Sea Launch, Zenit-3SL	15 June 2002	Active	
Galaxy 12	Orbital Sciences Corporation	GEOStar-2	Ariane 5G	9 April 2003	Active	
Galaxy 13	Hughes	HS-601HP	Sea Launch, Zenit-3SL	1 October 2003	Active	
Galaxy 14	Orbital Sciences Corporation	GEOStar-2	Soyuz-FG / Fregat	14 August 2005	Active	
Galaxy 15	Orbital Sciences Corporation	GEOStar-2	Ariane 5GS	14 October 2005	Active - Failure on orbit of command system, April 2010. Control re-established in December 2010.	Wide Area Augmentation System (WAAS) payload
