= GOES 15 =

US Space Force weather satellite

EWS-G2
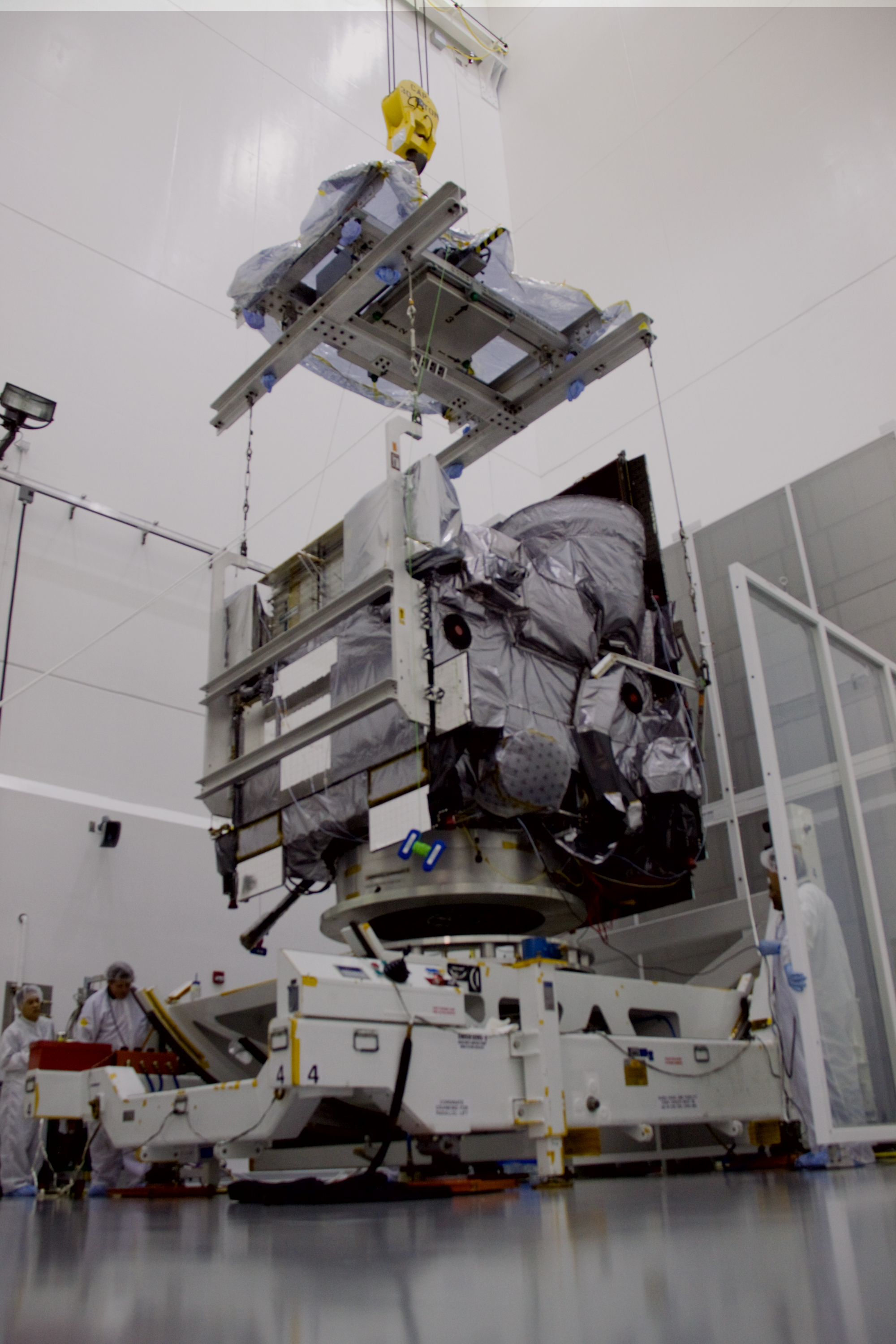
- The GOES-15 satellite during pre-launch processing.
- Names: GOES-P; GOES-15 (before September 22, 2023)
- Mission type: Weather satellite
- Operator: NOAA / NASA
- COSPAR ID: 2010-008A
- SATCAT no.: 36411
- Mission duration: 10 years (planned); Elapsed: 16 years, 7 months, 18 days

Spacecraft properties
- Spacecraft type: GOES-N series
- Bus: BSS-601
- Manufacturer: Boeing; ITT Corporation
- Power: 2.3 kilowatts from solar array

Start of mission
- Launch date: 4 March 2010, 23:57 UTC
- Rocket: Delta IV-M+(4,2)
- Launch site: Cape Canaveral, SLC-37B
- Contractor: United Launch Alliance

Orbital parameters
- Reference system: Geocentric
- Regime: Geostationary
- Longitude: 62° East
- Semi-major axis: 42,166 kilometres (26,201 mi)
- Perigee altitude: 35,791.0 kilometres (22,239.5 mi)
- Apogee altitude: 35,800.4 kilometres (22,245.3 mi)
- Inclination: 0.2°
- Period: 1,436.2 minutes
- Electro‑Optical/Infrared Weather System Geostationary Operational Environmental Satellite (Second Generation)

EWS-G2 (Electro-optical Infrared Weather System Geostationary) is a weather satellite of the U.S. Space Force, formerly GOES-15 (also known as GOES-P before becoming operational). The spacecraft was constructed by Boeing, and is the last of three GOES satellites to be based on the BSS-601 bus. It was launched in 2010, while the other BSS-601 GOES satellites—GOES-13 and GOES-14—were launched in May 2006 and June 2009 respectively. It was the sixteenth GOES satellite to be launched.

== Launch ==
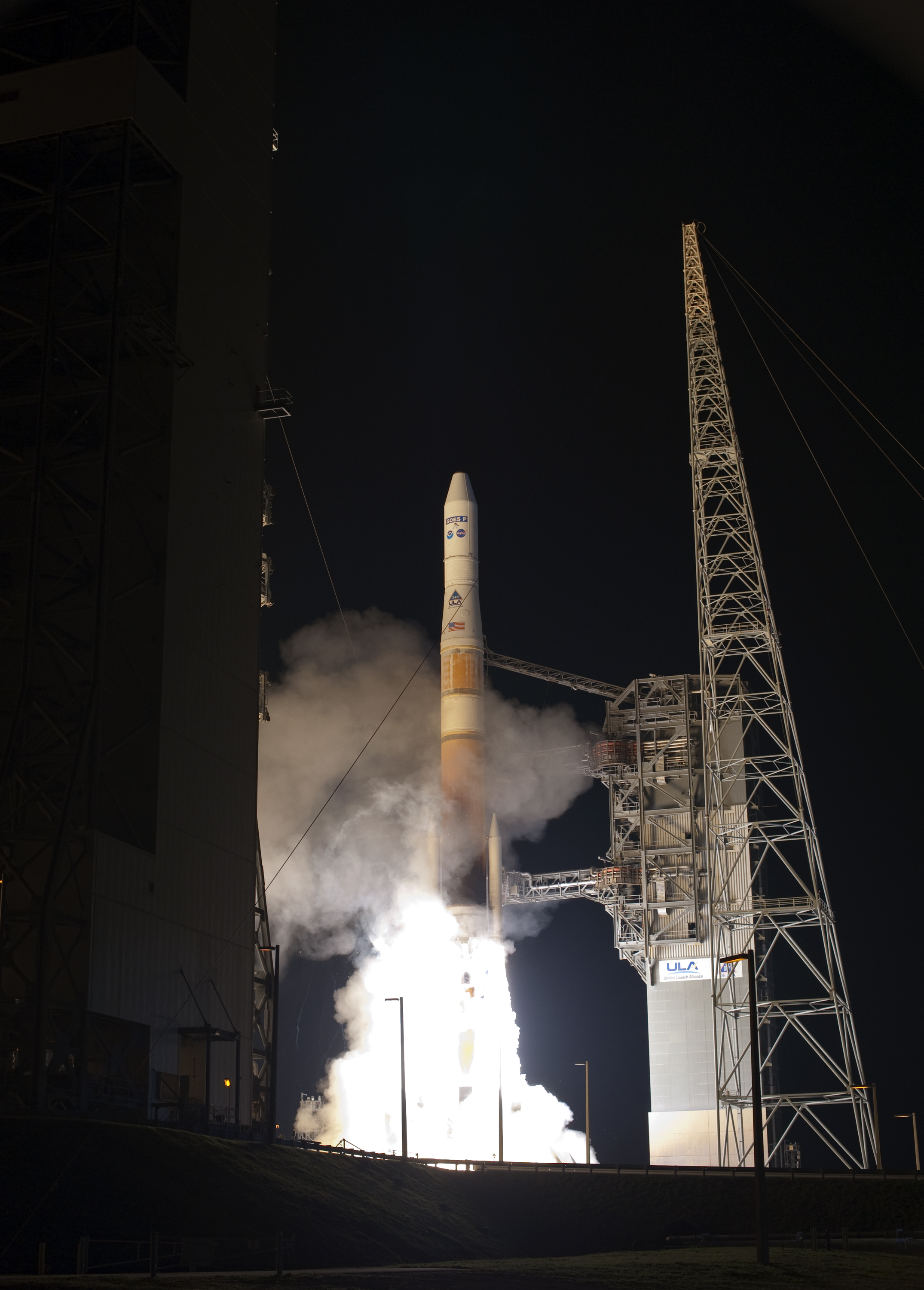
GOES-15 launches from Cape Canaveral Air Force Station SLC-37B, 4 March 2010.

GOES-15 was launched atop a Delta IV-M+(4,2) rocket flying from Space Launch Complex 37B at the Cape Canaveral Air Force Station. The launch occurred at 23:57 UTC on 4 March 2010, forty minutes into a sixty-minute launch window. Upon reaching geostationary orbit on 16 March, it was redesignated GOES-15. On 6 December 2011, it was activated as the GOES-West satellite, replacing GOES-11.

== Design ==
At launch, the mass of the satellite was 3,238 kilograms (7,139 lb). It has a design life of ten years. Power is supplied by a single gallium arsenide solar panel, which provides up to 2.3 kilowatts of power. A 24 cell nickel hydrogen battery is used to provide power when the satellite is not in sunlight. Instruments aboard GOES-15 include a five channel multispectral imager to capture visible light and infrared images of the continental United States, a sounder to take readings of atmospheric temperature and moisture, a solar x-ray imager to detect solar flares, and instruments to monitor the magnetosphere, cosmic background radiation and charged particles.

== Operations ==
NOAA began to transition GOES-15 out of operational status at the GOES-West position in late 2018 to replace it with GOES-17. GOES-15 began an eastward drift maneuver on 29 October 2018 to 128° W, with all of its sensors still functioning. GOES-15's drift is intended to provide additional separation from GOES-17 to prevent communication interference. GOES-15 drifted east at a rate of 0.88° per day until 7 November 2018, when it reached its new operating location of 128° West. Once GOES-17 reached its assigned longitude on 13 November 2018, additional tests were performed; provided that testing goes well, GOES-17 will become operational as GOES-West on 10 December 2018. Both GOES-17 and GOES-15 operated in tandem through early 2020 to allow for assessment of the performance of GOES-17 as the GOES-West operational satellite. On March 2, 2020, GOES-15 was deactivated and moved to a storage orbit, with plans to re-activate it in August 2020 to back up GOES-17 operations due to a known flaw causing many sensors to become unreliable at night during certain times of the year. On 22 September 2023 the satellite's ownership was officially transferred to the U.S. Space Force, taking its current designation as part of the EWS-G network. As a consequence, the spacecraft has started drifting over the Indian Ocean to reach its new assigned orbit and it's scheduled to become operational in November 2023.

== Media ==
Launch video (5 min 30 s)
