= PAS-4 =

American geostationary spacecraft

- Names: PANAMSAT 4 Intelsat 4 IS-4; Panamsat K3
- Mission type: Communications
- Operator: PanAmSat; Intelsat
- COSPAR ID: 1995-040A
- SATCAT no.: 23636
- Website: https://www.intelsat.com
- Mission duration: 15 years (planned)

Spacecraft properties
- Bus: HS-601
- Manufacturer: Hughes
- Launch mass: 2,920 kg (6,440 lb)
- Dry mass: 1,727 kg (3,807 lb)

Start of mission
- Launch date: 3 August 1995, 22:58:00 UTC
- Rocket: Ariane-42L H10-3 (V76)
- Launch site: Centre Spatial Guyanais, ELA-2
- Contractor: Arianespace
- Entered service: October 1995

End of mission
- Disposal: Graveyard orbit

Orbital parameters
- Reference system: Geocentric orbit
- Regime: Geostationary orbit
- Longitude: 72° East

Transponders
- Band: 50 transponders: 20 C-band; 30 Ku-band
- Coverage area: Europe, Africa, Middle East, Asia

PAS 4, was an American geostationary satellite that was launched by an Ariane 4.

== Satellite description ==
PAS-4 was constructed by Hughes Aircraft Corporation, based on the HS-601 satellite bus. It had a mass at launch of 2,920 kg (6,440 lb), which decreased to around 1,727 kg (3,807 lb) by the time it was operational. Designed for an operational life of 15 years, the spacecraft was equipped with 20 C-band and 30 Ku-band transponders. Its two solar panels, which had a span of 26 m (85 ft) generated 4.7 kW of power when the spacecraft first entered service, which was expected to drop to around 4.3 kW by the end of the vehicle's operational life.

== Launch ==
Arianespace launched PAS-4, using an Ariane 4 launch vehicle, flight number V76, in the Ariane 42L H10-3 configuration. The launch took place from ELA-2 at the Centre Spatial Guyanais, at Kourou in French Guiana, on 3 August 1995, at 22:58:00 UTC.
