= PAS-3 =

Communications satellite

- Names: PanAmSat-3; Panamsat K2
- Mission type: Communications
- Operator: PanAmSat
- Mission duration: 15 years (planned); Failed to orbit

Spacecraft properties
- Spacecraft type: Boeing 601
- Bus: HS-601
- Manufacturer: Hughes
- Launch mass: 2,920 kg (6,440 lb)
- Dry mass: 1,727 kg (3,807 lb)
- Power: 4.3 kW

Start of mission
- Launch date: 1 December 1994, 22:57:51 UTC
- Rocket: Ariane 42P H10-3 (V70)
- Launch site: Centre Spatial Guyanais, ELA-2
- Contractor: Arianespace
- Entered service: Failed to orbit

Orbital parameters
- Reference system: Geocentric orbit (planned)
- Regime: Geostationary orbit

Transponders
- Band: 40 transponders: 20 C band 20 Ku-band
- Coverage area: Atlantic Ocean Region

PAS-3, was a communications satellite for PanAmSat. Launched in December 1994.

== Satellite description ==
PAS-3 was constructed by Hughes Aircraft Corporation, based on the HS-601 satellite bus. It had a mass at launch of 2,920 kg (6,440 lb), which decreased to around 1,727 kg (3,807 lb) by the time it was operational. Designed for an operational life of 15 years, the spacecraft was equipped with 20 C-band and 20 Ku-band transponders. Its two solar panels, which had a span of 26 m (85 ft) generated 4.7 kW of power when the spacecraft first entered service, which was expected to drop to around 4.3 kW by the end of the vehicle's operational life.

== Launch ==
Arianespace launched PAS-3, using an Ariane 4 launch vehicle, flight number V70, in the Ariane 42P H10-3 configuration. The launch took place from ELA-2 at the Centre Spatial Guyanais, at Kourou in French Guiana, at 23:05:32 UTC on 8 July 1994. Failed to orbit.
