= Galaxy 4 (disambiguation) =

Galaxy 4 may refer to:

== Technology ==
- Samsung Galaxy S4, an Android smartphone produced by Samsung
- Samsung Galaxy Tab S4, an Android tablet produced by Samsung
- Galaxy IV, a satellite belonging to Intelsat's Galaxy fleet

== Other uses ==
- Galaxy 4, the first serial of the third season in the British science fiction television series Doctor Who
