= Galaxy 33 =

Intelsat communications satellite

- Mission type: Communications
- Operator: Intelsat
- COSPAR ID: 2022-128A
- SATCAT no.: 54026
- Website: Galaxy 33 and 34
- Mission duration: 15 years (planned); 3 years, 4 months, 11 days (elapsed)

Spacecraft properties
- Spacecraft type: Galaxy
- Bus: GEOStar-3
- Manufacturer: Northrop Grumman
- Launch mass: 3,654 kg (8,056 lb)

Start of mission
- Launch date: October 8, 2022, 23:05 UTC
- Rocket: Falcon-9 v1.2 (Block 5)
- Launch site: Cape Canaveral SLC-40
- Contractor: SpaceX
- Entered service: November 2023 (planned)

Orbital parameters
- Reference system: Geocentric orbit
- Regime: Geostationary orbit
- Slot: 133° West

Transponders
- Band: C-band; Ku-band; Ka-band
- Coverage area: North America

Galaxy 33 is a communications satellite owned by Intelsat located at 133° West longitude, serving the North American market. It was built by Northrop Grumman Innovation Systems, as part of its GEOStar-3 line. This satellite provides services in the C-band, Ku-band, and Ka-band.

== Launch ==
Galaxy 33 was launched aboard SpaceX’s Falcon 9 rocket from Cape Canaveral Space Force Station, Florida, United States on October 8, 2022.
