= Mary Anselmo =

American businesswoman

- Born: Mary Morton; September 21, 1929; Omro, Wisconsin, United States
- Died: August 14, 2013 (aged 83); West Harwich, Massachusetts, United States
- Occupation: Businesswoman
- Known for: Widow of Rene Anselmo, founder of PanAmSat
- Spouse: Rene Anselmo (m. c. 1955; died 1995)
- Children: 3

Mary Anselmo (née Morton; September 21, 1929 – August 14, 2013) was an American billionaire businesswoman. She was the widow of Rene Anselmo, the founder of PanAmSat, the first privately held satellite communications company in the United States.

== Career ==
Mary was born in Omro, Wisconsin. She met her husband Rene Anselmo in the 1950s while he was a guest director at Pasadena Playhouse. The couple married aroun 1955 in Mexico City, where Rene was working for Univision at the time.

Mary's husband Rene Anselmo died in 1995, two days before the initial public offering of his company. For a time, Mary was principal owner of the company, although she had rarely been involved in her husband's business and said in a 1996 interview with The New York Times that she knew little about satellites. When PanAmSat was bought by KKR and other private equity firms in 2004, she received a net $250 million.

She has appeared on multiple occasions on the Forbes magazine list of wealthiest people in the world. According to the magazine's 2008 rankings, her net worth was estimated at $1.1 billion, and her rank was 1,014.

== Personal life ==
She has three children: Reverge C. (born 1962), Pier (1953–2022), and Rayce Anselmo. Mary died on August 14, 2013, and is buried in West Harwich, Massachusetts.
