= PAS-1 =

Communications satellite owned by PanAmSat

- Names: PanAmSat-1; ASC-3
- Mission type: Communications
- Operator: PanAmSat
- COSPAR ID: 1988-051C
- SATCAT no.: 19217
- Mission duration: 10 years (planned); 13 years (achieved)

Spacecraft properties
- Bus: AS-3000
- Manufacturer: RCA Astro-Electronics
- Launch mass: 1,220 kg (2,690 lb)
- Dimensions: 1 x 1.3 x 1.6 m

Start of mission
- Launch date: 15 June 1988, 11:19:01 UTC
- Rocket: Ariane 44LP H10 (V22)
- Launch site: Centre Spatial Guyanais, ELA-2
- Contractor: Arianespace
- Entered service: August 1988

End of mission
- Disposal: Graveyard orbit
- Deactivated: 2001

Orbital parameters
- Reference system: Geocentric orbit
- Regime: Geostationary orbit
- Longitude: 45° West

Transponders
- Band: 18 transponders: 12 C-band; 6 Ku-band
- Coverage area: Hawaii, Canada, United States, Mexico, Panama, Caribbean

PAS-1 was a communications satellite owned by PanAmSat located at 45° West longitude, serving the Americas market. PAS-1 was also the first, privately owned, international telecommunication satellite. It was originally built for Contel ASC as ASC 3, but purchased before launch. It was primarily used for the main television channel of Panama. It was the first satellite to be able to service to five different American countries.
