= Telstar 302 =

Communications satellite launched in 1984

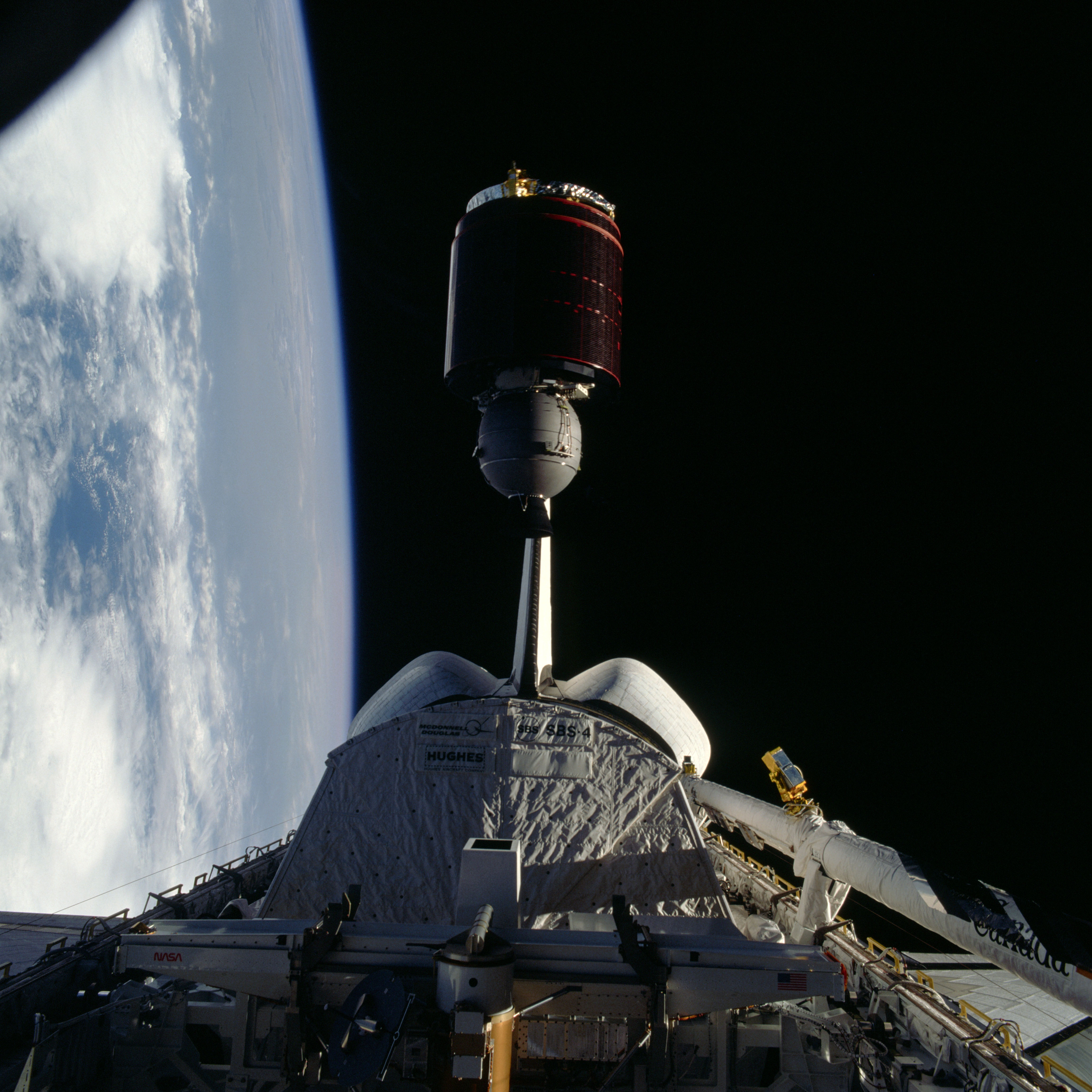
- Telstar 302 in orbit.
- Mission type: Communications
- Operator: AT&T Corp. → Loral Skynet
- COSPAR ID: 1984-093B
- SATCAT no.: 15237
- Mission duration: 13 years

Spacecraft properties
- Bus: HS-376
- Manufacturer: Hughes
- Launch mass: 1,140 kilograms (2,510 lb)
- BOL mass: 653 kilograms (1,440 lb)

Start of mission
- Launch date: August 30, 1984, 12:41:50 UTC
- Rocket: Space Shuttle Discovery STS-41D
- Launch site: Kennedy LC-39A
- Contractor: NASA

Orbital parameters
- Reference system: Geocentric
- Regime: Geostationary
- Longitude: 45° west
- Eccentricity: 0.02136
- Perigee altitude: 34,776 kilometres (21,609 mi)
- Apogee altitude: 36,573 kilometres (22,725 mi)
- Inclination: 0.4°
- Period: 1,430.3 minutes
- Epoch: September 1, 1984

Transponders
- Band: 24 C-band
- Coverage area: North America

Telstar 302 was a geostationary communication satellite built by Hughes, it was located at orbital position of 85 degrees west longitude and was operated by AT&T Corp. The satellite was based on the HS-376 platform and its life expectancy was 10 years. Telstar 302 left service on September 5, 1997. The satellite was successfully launched into space on August 30, 1984, at 12:41:50 UTC, aboard the Space Shuttle Discovery during the STS-41D mission from the Kennedy Space Center in Florida, United States, Along with the SBS 4 satellites and Leasat 2. It had a launch mass of 1,140 kg.

Telstar 302 was equipped with 24 C band transponders to provide telecommunication service to North America (including U.S. state of Hawaii and Puerto Rico).
