= Intelsat 2 =

Communications satellite

- Names: IS-2; PAS-2; PanAmSat-2; Panamsat K1
- Mission type: Communications
- Operator: PanAmSat (1994-2006); Intelsat (2006-2011)
- COSPAR ID: 1994-040A
- SATCAT no.: 23175
- Website: http://www.intelsat.com
- Mission duration: 15 years (planned); 16.5 years (achieved)

Spacecraft properties
- Spacecraft: PAS-2
- Spacecraft type: Boeing 601
- Bus: HS-601
- Manufacturer: Hughes
- Launch mass: 2,920 kg (6,440 lb)
- Dry mass: 1,727 kg (3,807 lb)
- Power: 4.3 kW

Start of mission
- Launch date: 8 July 1994, 23:05:32 UTC
- Rocket: Ariane 44L H10+ (V65)
- Launch site: Centre Spatial Guyanais, ELA-2
- Contractor: Arianespace
- Entered service: September 1994

End of mission
- Disposal: Graveyard orbit
- Deactivated: July 2011
- Last contact: 28 February 2011

Orbital parameters
- Reference system: Geocentric orbit
- Regime: Geostationary orbit
- Longitude: 169° East (1994-2010); 157° East (2010); 174° East (2010-2011)

Transponders
- Band: 40 transponders: 20 C band 20 Ku-band
- Coverage area: Oceania, Pacific Rim, Pacific Ocean region

Intelsat 2, formerly PAS-2, was a communications satellite operated by Intelsat which spent most of its operational life serving the Pacific Rim market from a longitude of 169° East. Launched in July 1994, the satellite was operated by PanAmSat until it merged with Intelsat in 2006. The spacecraft was renamed, along with the rest of PanAmSat's fleet, on 1 February 2007.

== Satellite description ==
PAS-2 was constructed by the Hughes Aircraft Corporation, based on the HS-601 satellite bus. It had a mass at launch of 2,920 kg (6,440 lb), which decreased to around 1,727 kg (3,807 lb) by the time it was operational. Designed for an operational life of 15 years, the spacecraft was equipped with 20 C-band and 20 Ku-band transponders. Its two solar panels, which had a span of 26 m (85 ft) generated 4.7 kW of power when the spacecraft first entered service, which was expected to drop to around 4.3 kW by the end of the vehicle's operational life.

== Launch ==
Arianespace launched PAS-2, using an Ariane 4 launch vehicle, flight number V65, in the Ariane 44L H10+ configuration. The launch took place from ELA-2 at the Centre Spatial Guyanais at 23:05:32 UTC on 8 July 1994. The satellite was placed into a geosynchronous transfer orbit (GTO), from which it raised itself into geostationary orbit by means of an R-4D-11-300 apogee motor.

== Intelsat 2 ==
Intelsat 2 (PAS-2), launched in January 1996, the satellite was operated by PanAmSat until it merged with Intelsat in 2006. The spacecraft was renamed, along with the rest of PanAmSat's fleet, on 1 February 2007.

== Decommissioning ==
Intelsat 2 was removed from geostationary orbit in February 2011, being placed into graveyard orbit on 28 February 2011. Manoeuvring into graveyard orbit did not fully deplete the satellite's propellant as had been expected, so engineering operations continued until July 2011 in order to exhaust the remaining supply. The satellite was then decommissioned and powered down.
