= ISACOMM =

ISA Communications Services, Inc. (ISACOMM) was a long-distance telephone company headquartered in Atlanta. It was the first telephone company to offer a virtual network service to corporations and the first to offer codec-based videoconferencing services. The company was also a pioneer in shared tenant services, by which a commercial landlord includes telecommunications services in its lease package.

== Formation ==
ISACOMM began as a concept within Insurance Systems of America (ISA), an Atlanta company founded in 1970 to write and license applications software for the insurance industry. Sensing an opportunity in the telecommunications market, ISA created ISACOMM in 1978. Several insurance companies took minority ownership positions in ISACOMM, but ISA retained majority ownership. The founders of ISACOMM were Richard C. Smith, an executive from ISA, and Kenneth H. Crandall, a principal in the creation of Satellite Business Systems (SBS). Smith and Crandall were ISACOMM's CEO and CTO, respectively. Smith later became CEO of Telcordia.

== Marketing ==
Customers of ISACOMM understood their relationship to be with ISACOMM, not SBS. As an interstate carrier, ISACOMM was subject to regulation by the Federal Communications Commission and had to file its own tariffs, although progressive deregulation of the industry made the tariff process increasingly irrelevant.

The original target market for ISACOMM was the insurance industry, with whom the ISACOMM management had strong connections arising from the history of ISA. However, ISACOMM quickly pursued the Fortune 500 (except for those corporations who were large enough to be served directly by SBS). ISACOMM did not sell long-distance services to consumers.

ISACOMM's principal competitor was AT&T. The success of ISACOMM in winning customers away from AT&T, at the same time that MCI and Sprint were doing likewise, provided confirmation that open competition in the long-distance market was viable.

== Technology ==
Beyond voice and data services, ISACOMM became a leader in videoconferencing by installing videoconferencing rooms around the country, initially using the SBS network for connectivity and subsequently using its own earth station network. ISACOMM engineered each room and provided a centralized reservations facility. These videoconference rooms could be reserved by corporations on an hourly basis, under the brand of the Meeting Channel. Arrangements were made with Bell Canada and British Telecom to extend the videoconferencing capability over international circuits.

ISACOMM operated its own "back office" for customer billing and network analysis. The back office was unusual in that it relied almost completely upon systems from Tandem Computers. Tandem systems were originally bought by ISACOMM to power a transaction routing service that connected insurance companies with independent insurance agents, an early form of electronic commerce. ISACOMM was a reference account for Tandem in the telecommunications sector.

== Evolution ==
In 1981, United Telecommunications, Inc. of Westwood, Kansas (United Telecom) acquired ISA, including its majority ownership of ISACOMM. United Telecom was developing its strategy to evolve from a local telephone company into a major player in the long-distance market. This strategy ultimately led to the deployment of a nationwide fiber optic network that replaced satellites as the basis for ISACOMM's services. In a series of M&A transactions, ISACOMM was pooled with US Telecom (which United Telecom separately acquired) and GTE's Sprint into a transitional joint venture between United Telecom and GTE known as US Sprint. ISACOMM became the National Accounts Division of US Sprint. Several years later, United Telecom acquired GTE's stake in the joint venture and adopted the Sprint name for the parent corporation.

Sprint subsequently merged with Nextel to become Sprint Nextel Corporation.
