= Galaxy 18 =

Geosynchronous communications satellite

- Operator: Intelsat
- COSPAR ID: 2008-024A
- SATCAT no.: 32951
- Mission duration: 15 years

Spacecraft properties
- Bus: LS-1300
- Manufacturer: Space Systems/Loral
- Launch mass: 4,642 kilograms (10,234 lb)

Start of mission
- Launch date: May 21, 2008, 09:43:22 UTC
- Rocket: Zenit-3SL
- Launch site: Odyssey
- Contractor: Sea Launch

Orbital parameters
- Reference system: Geocentric
- Regime: Geostationary
- Longitude: 123° West (0°N 123°W)

Transponders
- Band: 24 IEEE C band 24 IEEE K_{u} band
- Coverage area: United States, Canada, Mexico

Galaxy 18 is a Space Systems/Loral (SS/L) 1300-series hybrid communications satellite owned by Intelsat and located in geosynchronous orbit at 123° W longitude, serving the continental United States, Alaska, Hawaii, Mexico, and Canada with 24 C band, and 24 K_{u} band transponders. Galaxy 18 replaced Galaxy 10R near the end of its design life.

Galaxy 18 was launched on May 21, 2008. The launch took place successfully at 09:43 GMT.

== Free-to-air television ==
Galaxy 18 is the home of a number of minor television networks, and in the past hosted the stations of Equity Media Holdings before its 2009 bankruptcy, where it used the satellite to beam several major network affiliates to their appropriate local transmitters, along with the local cable providers carrying them as Equity hubbed their master control from a hub in Little Rock, Arkansas.
