= Intelsat 3R =

Geostationary communications satellite

- Names: PAS-3R; PANAMSAT 3R; IS-3R; Panamsat K4
- Mission type: Communications
- Operator: PanAmSat (1996-2006); Intelsat (2006-2011)
- COSPAR ID: 1996-002A
- SATCAT no.: 23764
- Website: http://www.intelsat.com
- Mission duration: 15 years (planned); 15 years (achieved)

Spacecraft properties
- Spacecraft type: Boeimg 601
- Bus: HS-601
- Manufacturer: Hughes
- Launch mass: 2,920 kg (6,440 lb)
- Dry mass: 1,727 kg (3,807 lb)
- Power: 4.3 kW

Start of mission
- Launch date: 12 January 1996, 23:10:00 UTC
- Rocket: Ariane 44L H10-3 (V82)
- Launch site: Centre Spatial Guyanais, ELA-2
- Contractor: Arianespace
- Entered service: March 1996

End of mission
- Disposal: Graveyard orbit
- Deactivated: August 2011

Orbital parameters
- Reference system: Geocentric orbit
- Regime: Geostationary orbit
- Longitude: 43° West (1996-2010); 81° West (2010-2011)

Transponders
- Band: 40 transponders: 20 C-band; 20 Ku-band
- Coverage area: Americas, Caribbean, Europe, Africa

Intelsat 3R (formerly PAS-3R) is a communications satellite serving the Americas market. It is owned by Intelsat and located at 43° West longitude.

== Satellite description ==
Hughes Aircraft Corporation constructed the satellite based on the HS-601 satellite bus, having a mass at launch of 2,920 kg (6,440 lb), which decreased to around 1,727 kg (3,807 lb) when it was operational.

The spacecraft had 20 C-band and 20 Ku-band transponders. Its two solar panels spanned 26 m (85 ft) and generated 4.7 kW of power when the spacecraft first entered service. The power was expected to drop to around 4.3 kW by the end of the vehicle's operational life, i.e., 15 years.

== Launch ==
Arianespace launched PAS-3R using an Ariane 4 launch vehicle, flight number V82, in the Ariane 44L H10-3 configuration. The launch occurred on 12 January 1996 at 23:10:00 UTC from ELA-2 at the Centre Spatial Guyanais, at Kourou in French Guiana.

== Intelsat 3R ==
Intelsat 3R was launched in January 1996 and operated by PanAmSat until it merged with Intelsat in 2006. The spacecraft and the rest of PanAmSat's fleet were renamed on 1 February 2007.

== Decommissioning ==
Intelsat 3R was removed from geostationary orbit in August 2011 and was placed into graveyard orbit.
