= GOES 13 =

U.S. Space Force weather satellite

EWS-G1
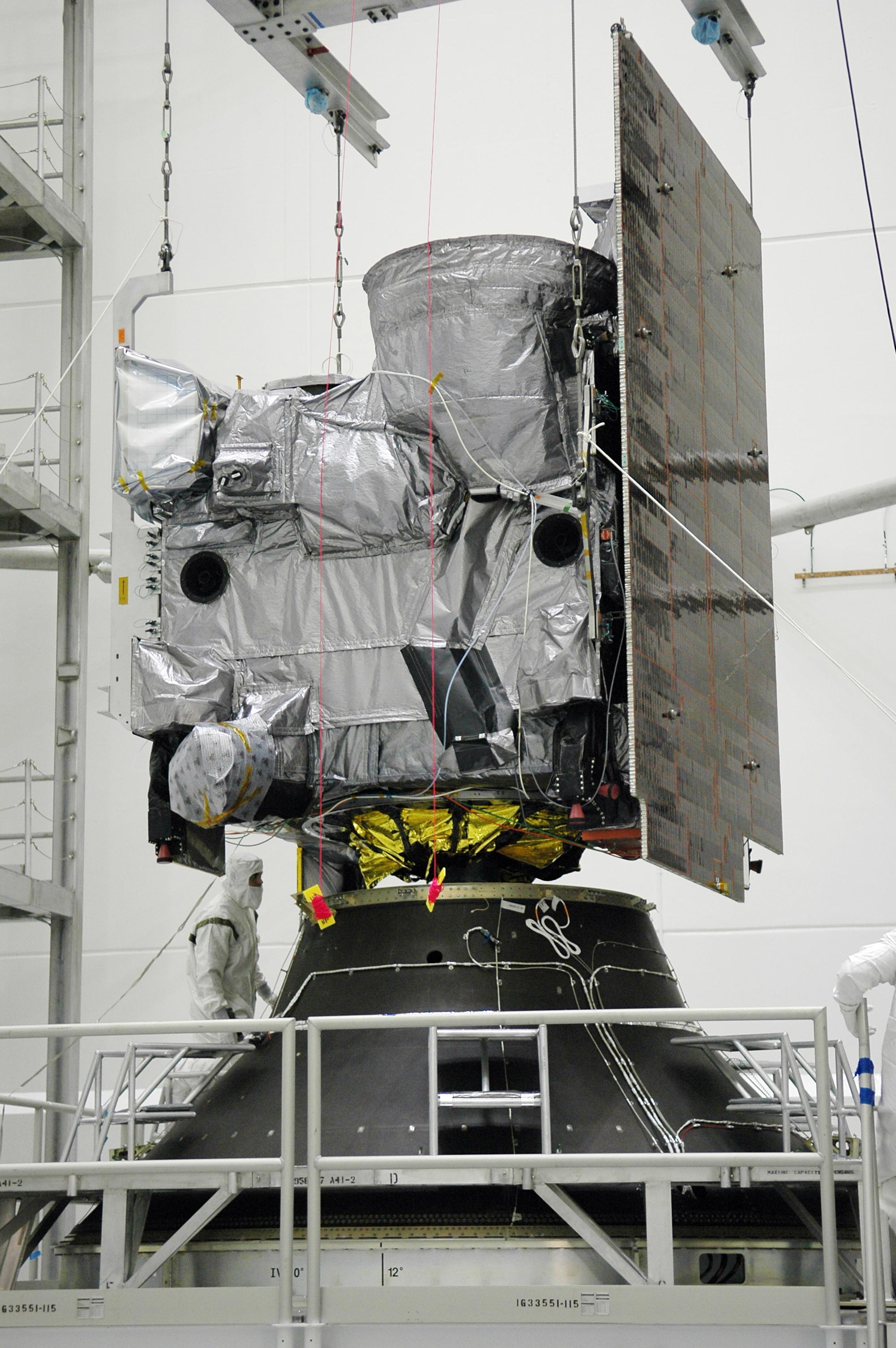
- GOES-N during processing
- Names: GOES-N; GOES-13 (before September 8, 2020)
- Mission type: Weather satellite
- Operator: NOAA/NASA and USSF
- COSPAR ID: 2006-018A
- SATCAT no.: 29155
- Website: goes.gsfc.nasa.gov
- Mission duration: 10 years (planned); 20 years, 4 months and 28 days (elapsed)

Spacecraft properties
- Spacecraft type: GOES-N series
- Bus: BSS-601
- Manufacturer: Boeing
- Launch mass: 3133 kg
- Power: 2300 watts

Start of mission
- Launch date: 24 May 2006, 22:11:00 UTC
- Rocket: Delta IV-M+(4,2)
- Launch site: Cape Canaveral, SLC-37B
- Contractor: Boeing

End of mission
- Disposal: Decommissioned
- Deactivated: NET February 2024

Orbital parameters
- Reference system: Geocentric orbit
- Regime: Geostationary orbit
- Longitude: 61.5° East
- Slot: Indian Ocean
- Geostationary Operational Environmental Satellite (Second Generation) Electro‑Optical/Infrared Weather System

EWS-G1 (Electro-optical Infrared Weather System Geostationary) is a weather satellite of the U.S. Space Force, formerly GOES-13 (also known as GOES-N before becoming operational) and part of the National Oceanic and Atmospheric Administration's Geostationary Operational Environmental Satellite system. On 14 April 2010, GOES-13 became the operational weather satellite for GOES-East. It was replaced by GOES-16 on 18 December 2017 and on 8 January 2018 its instruments were shut off and it began its three-week drift to an on-orbit storage location at 60.0° West longitude, arriving on 31 January 2018. It remained there as a backup satellite in case one of the operational GOES satellites had a problem until early July 2019, when it started to drift westward and was being transferred to the U.S. Air Force, and then the U.S. Space Force.

GOES-13 arrived at 61.5° East longitude in mid-February 2020. The satellite was renamed EWS-G1 and became fully operational over the Indian Ocean basin on September 8, 2020. EWS-G2 (GOES-15) was drafted to replace it in September 2023.

EWS-G1's last image was captured on October 31, 2023.

== Launch ==
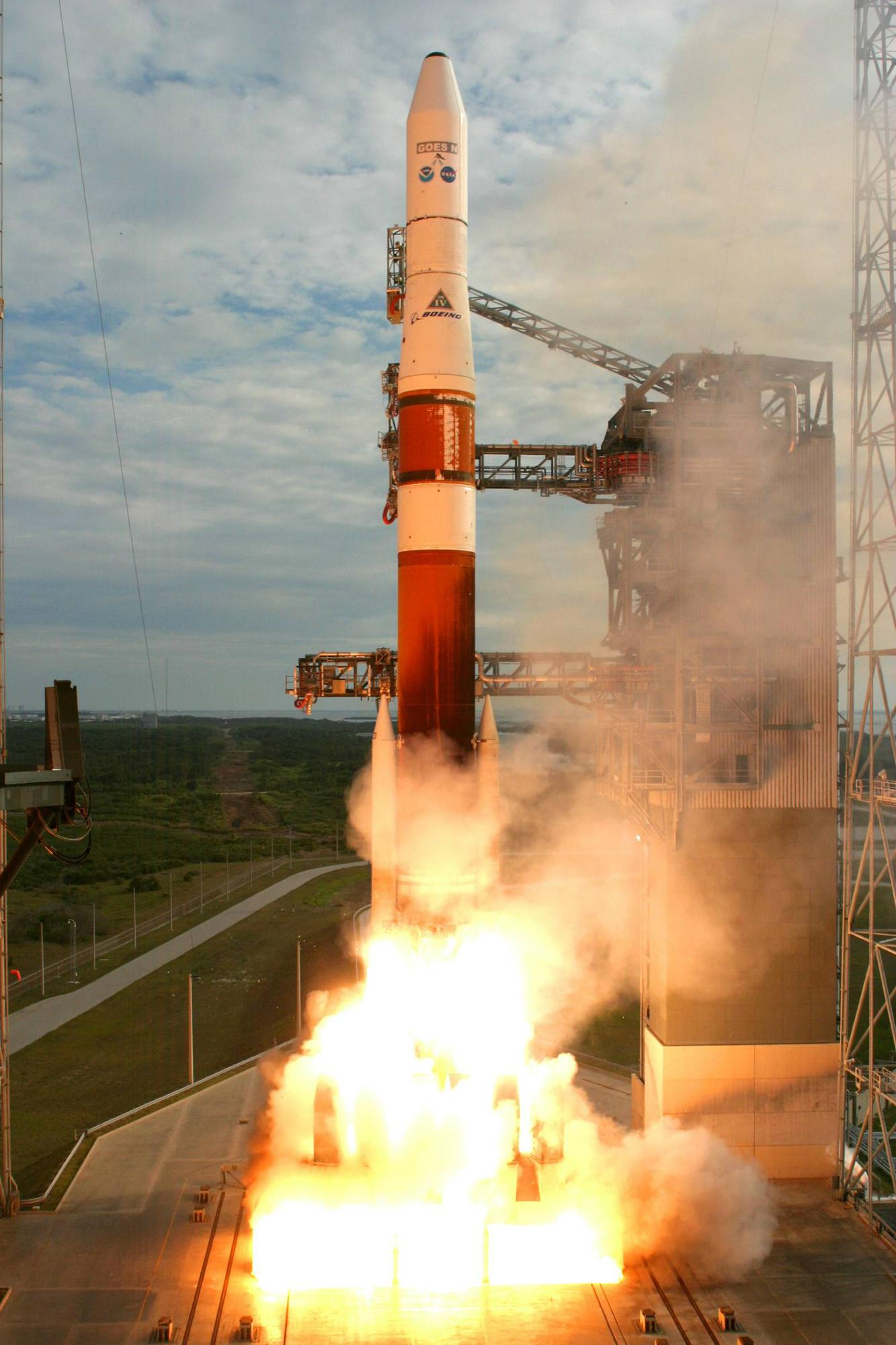
Launch of GOES-13

GOES-N was launched aboard a Boeing Delta IV-M+(4,2) rocket, flying from SLC-37B at the Cape Canaveral. The launch occurred at 22:11:00 UTC on 24 May 2006.

The launch had been delayed significantly due to a number of issues. First, it had been scheduled to fly on a Delta III, but after three consecutive failures on its first three flights, the Delta III was canceled, with GOES launches being transferred to the Delta IV. Further delays were caused after the previous Delta IV launch, the maiden flight of the Heavy configuration, suffered a partial failure. Then, two launch attempts in August 2005 were scrubbed, the second attempt just four minutes and 26 seconds prior to liftoff.

After these launch attempts, the rocket's flight termination system batteries expired, requiring replacement. A strike by workers at Boeing subsequently pushed the launch back to May 2006.

== Spacecraft ==
At launch, the satellite had a mass of 3,133 kilograms (6,907 lb), and an expected operational lifespan of ten years, although it carries fuel for longer. It was built by Boeing, based on the BSS-601 satellite bus, and was the first of three GOES-N series satellites to be launched.

== Operations ==
In December 2007, GOES-13 was called up to provide coverage of the East Coast of the United States during an outage of GOES-12 due to a thruster leak. After the problem with GOES-12 cleared, it resumed operations, and GOES-13 was deactivated again. It was also briefly activated in mid-May 2009 when GOES-12 developed another thruster problem, however, it did not need to take over operations, and was deactivated by the end of the month. In April 2010, GOES-13 replaced GOES-12 as GOES-East at 75.0° West. GOES-13 served actively as GOES-East from April 2010 to December 2017. In December 2017, GOES-16 replaced GOES-13 as GOES-East. On 14 December 2017, GOES-13's direct (GOES VARiable transmission format) GVAR was disabled. The GOES-13 GVAR and (Low Rate Information Transmission) LRIT were relayed through GOES-14 until 8 January 2018, at which time the GOES-13 GVAR relay through GOES-14 GVAR was disabled. GOES-13 ceased transmitting data, began drifting to its storage location at 60.0° West on 9 January 2018, and arrived there on 31 January 2018. GOES-13 remained at 60.0° West as a backup satellite, in case one of the operational GOES satellites malfunctioned.

In January 2017, the United States Air Force started to consider taking over a spare GOES satellite for monitoring the Indian Ocean as the Meteosat-8 satellite was expected to be out of fuel in 2020 (later extended to 2022). GOES-13 was brought out of storage on 19 June 2019 for a period of testing, and began to drift westward since 2 July 2019. In September 2019, NOAA confirmed that GOES-13 had been transferred to the U.S. Air Force after the two-year negotiation in order to fill a gap in forecasting requirements, but NOAA would continue operating the satellite on behalf of the U.S. Air Force for its remaining life span. GOES-13 was later transferred to the United States Space Force since its establishment in December 2019. After the 7-month drift, GOES-13 eventually arrived at 61.5° East longitude in mid-February 2020. On September 8, 2020, the Space and Missile Systems Center announced the newly renamed EWS-G1 (Electro-optical Infrared Weather System Geostationary) satellite became fully operational with the joint efforts between the U.S. Space Force, NOAA, and NASA.

=== Anomalies ===
In December 2006, GOES-13 observed a solar flare so intense it damaged its Solar X-ray Imager (SXI).

On 12 September 2012, GOES-13 began to return images with an excessive amount of noise. The noise gradually increased to the point at which the satellite was placed in standby mode on 24 September 2012 in order to allow engineers to diagnose the problem. GOES-15 temporarily provided backup imagery for a short time, with GOES-14 being taken out of in-orbit storage and prepared to be a longer-term replacement including movement towards the 75.0° slot normally occupied by GOES-East. GOES-13 returned to normal operations on 18 October 2012. GOES-14 was kept in normal operations and used to monitor Hurricane Sandy in parallel with GOES-13 before GOES-14 returned to standby status.

On 22 May 2013, at 03:40 UTC, GOES-13 was apparently hit by a micrometeorite or orbital debris (MMOD) which caused it to lose track of the stars that it uses to maintain attitude. The satellite then went into safe mode and shut down all of its instruments. The hit was believed to occur on the solar array yoke. In the short term GOES-15 was reconfigured to cover the entire United States, but operators activated GOES-14 to take over GOES-East operations at 06:00 UTC on 23 May 2013. GOES-13 was scheduled to return to operational status at 15:45 UTC on 6 June 2013 However, that was delayed due to a Critical Weather Day and Tropical Storm Andrea. It returned to full duty on 10 June 2013.

On 20 November 2015, at 09:22 UTC, the GOES-13 Sounder experienced an anomaly. GOES engineers determined that the Filter Wheel had stopped moving (the filter wheel aligns the infrared detectors with the incoming data) so data were not scanned. All 18 infrared channels were affected; the visible channel (band 19) continued sending usable data until the instruments were shut down in 2018.

== See also ==
- 2006 in spaceflight
- List of GOES satellites
