= Intelsat 5 =

Geostationary communications satellite

- Names: PAS-5; IS-5; Arabsat 2C; Badr-C
- Mission type: Communications
- Operator: PanAmSat / Intelsat
- COSPAR ID: 1997-046A
- SATCAT no.: 24916
- Website: http://www.intelsat.com
- Mission duration: 15 years (planned); 15 years (achieved)

Spacecraft properties
- Bus: HS-601HP
- Manufacturer: Hughes Space and Communications
- Launch mass: 3,600 kg (7,900 lb)
- Power: 10 kW

Start of mission
- Launch date: 28 August 1997, 00:33:30 UTC
- Rocket: Proton_K (Proton+ Blok 11S861 mod.3
- Launch site: Baikonur, Military Site 81, pad.23
- Contractor: Khrunichev State Research and Production Space Center, ILS (L&M)
- Entered service: October 1997

End of mission
- Disposal: move GSO orbit, i=9°
- Deactivated: 08. Juli. 2024

Orbital parameters
- Reference system: Geocentric orbit
- Regime: Geostationary orbit
- Longitude: 58° West (1997–2002); 26° East (2002–2007); 169° East (2007…2012), 166°e: to 08.Juli_2024.

Transponders
- Band: 56 transponder: 28 C-band; 28 Ku-band
- Coverage area: Americas - Europe (1997–2002), Middle East - Africa (2002–2007), Asia-Pacific, Antarktida (2007…2024)

Intelsat 5 (IS-5, PAZ_5 (System SS_Paz), Arabsat 2C) was a satellite providing television and communication services for Intelsat, which it was GSO to July 2024.

== Satellite description ==
Intelsat 5 (PAS-5) was built by Hughes Space and Communications. Intelsat 5 was the satellite that used Hughes’s HS‑601HP high‑power platform and it was able to produce almost 10 kilowatts of power at the start of its life.

Intelsat 5 used dual‑junction gallium arsenide cells, a newer battery system and a highly efficient xenon‑ion propulsion system (XIPS). PanAmSat was the customer for the HS‑601HP platform.

Intelsat 5 was launched on 28 August 1997 on a Proton-K rocket with a Block DM stage from the Baikonur Cosmodrome in Kazakhstan. It was designed to give video, direct‑to‑home television and telecommunications services covering the Americas and giving access to Europe.

Controllers saw that the nickel–hydrogen battery of Intelsat 5 was getting weaker. The satellite could not keep its payload working when it passed through an eclipse so parts of the payload had to be switched off during those times. The battery problem made Intelsat 5 lose a lot of capacity. PanAmSat received a settlement of about US$185 million after it was declared a loss, for insurance purposes.

== Arabsat 2C ==
PAS 5 was leased in May 2002 to the Arab Satellite Communications Organization (Arabsat), under the name of Arabsat 2C. Arabsat used the spacecraft's C-band transponders to complement its partially defunct Arabsat 3A at 26° East.

The television channels it broadcasts include BBC World News, Australia Network and regular feeds of Entertainment Tonight and The Wall Street Journal Report. As of 28 September 2012, BBC World News was replaced with a static video slate advising that the service would be only available on the existing horizontally aligned lower powered Pacific beam on Intelsat 19 which is 3.94 GHz.

== Intelsat 5 ==
Intelsat 5 was moved at 169° East and has been broadcasting Australia Network Pacific, Antarktida on the horizontally aligned L military Pacific Beam 4.1 GHz when went silent and was sent to a higher "move orbit" on 19 October 2012 around 23:00 UTC to 166°e. End of GSO, TDRSS type i=9°: 08.07.2024.. Used: TDRS J (Ken Bernhard), 171°W, i=10°.
