= Rene Anselmo =

American businessman and founder of Univision

Reynold "Rene" Anselmo
- Born: Reynold Vincent Anselmo; January 14, 1926; Boston, Massachusetts, U.S.
- Died: September 20, 1995 (aged 69); Greenwich, Connecticut, U.S.
- Education: University of Chicago
- Occupation: Telecommunications executive
- Spouse: Mary Anselmo
- Children: 3

Reynold Vincent "Rene" Anselmo (January 14, 1926 – September 20, 1995) was an American businessman who founded the satellite company PanAmSat and co-founded the television network Univision.

== Early life ==
Anselmo was born in Bedford, Massachusetts. His father was of Italian descent and the postmaster in Quincy. At the age of 16, he enlisted in the United States Marine Corps and flew 37 missions as a tail gunner on a dive bomber in the Pacific Theatre of Operations during World War II. He graduated from the University of Chicago in 1951.

== Career ==
Anselmo travelled to Mexico, where he was hired by Televisa to produce television shows for Mexican television. He wed his wife Mary during his residence in Mexico. Anselmo returned to the United States in 1963 to help run the Spanish-language television network Spanish International Network (the current day Univision). In 1984, he co-founded PanAmSat. PanAmSat gained a foothold in the television market by providing satellite services for private commercial communication networks, such as those used by international conglomerates to connect far flung manufacturing operations around the globe or provide data connections between a large number of retail outlets and corporate headquarters.

== Personal life ==
Anselmo was married to Mary Anselmo, with whom he had three children.

Anselmo was described as having "unflinching self-confidence and willingness to risk all in his fight to upend the status quo" in a tribute by SpaceNews. He challenged the monopoly in satellite provision held by Intelsat in the 1980s, taking out full-page ads in the Wall Street Journal asking political leaders, including former U.S. President Ronald Reagan, to open up the satellite telecommunications market. He donated over 100,000 daffodils and tulips to the city of Greenwich, Connecticut.

Anselmo died September 20, 1995, from heart disease, aged 69. PanAmSat was left to his wife and his son-in-law, Fred Landman.
