= Galaxy 4R =

Decommissioned geostationary communications satellite

Coordinates: 0°N 76.8°W

- Mission type: Communications
- Operator: PanAmSat (2000–2006); Intelsat (2006–2009)
- COSPAR ID: 2000-020A
- SATCAT no.: 26298
- Mission duration: 15 years

Spacecraft properties
- Bus: HS-601HP
- Manufacturer: Hughes
- Launch mass: 3,716 kilograms (8,192 lb)
- BOL mass: 2,511 kilograms (5,536 lb)
- Dry mass: 1,895 kilograms (4,178 lb)
- Power: 7,800 watts

Start of mission
- Launch date: 19 April 2000, 00:29 UTC
- Rocket: Ariane 42L
- Launch site: Kourou ELA-2
- Contractor: Arianespace

End of mission
- Disposal: Decommissioned
- Deactivated: April 2009

Orbital parameters
- Reference system: Geocentric
- Regime: Geostationary
- Longitude: 73° west (2000); 99° west (2000–2006); 76.85° west (2006–2009)

Transponders
- Band: 28 C-band; 28 Ku-band; 4 of each reserved as backups
- Coverage area: North America

Galaxy 4R was a communications satellite operated by PanAmSat from 2000 to 2006, and by Intelsat from 2006 to 2009. It spent most of its operational life at an orbital location of 99° W, a slot once occupied by the Galaxy IV, which suffered a failure in 1998. G4R was launched on April 18, 2000, with an Ariane launch vehicle, and covered North America with twenty-four transponders each on the C- and K_{u} bands. The satellite was stationed at 76.8°W, inclined.

Users included Warner Brothers, National Public Radio, Public Radio International, Buena Vista Television Distribution, FOX, and Televisa. The satellite was also utilized for satellite internet services through DirecPC.

Much of the K_{u} side was occupied by the HITS service, which re-distributes programming found on other satellites to cable providers.

Designed for an operational lifespan of 15 years, Galaxy 4R suffered a propulsion system failure in 2003 and was replaced by Galaxy 16 on August 14, 2006. It was moved to 76.85 degrees west after being replaced and its orbit was allowed to become more inclined in order to save station-keeping propellant. The satellite was decommissioned in April 2009 and moved to a graveyard orbit.
