= Boeing 601 =

Satellite bus

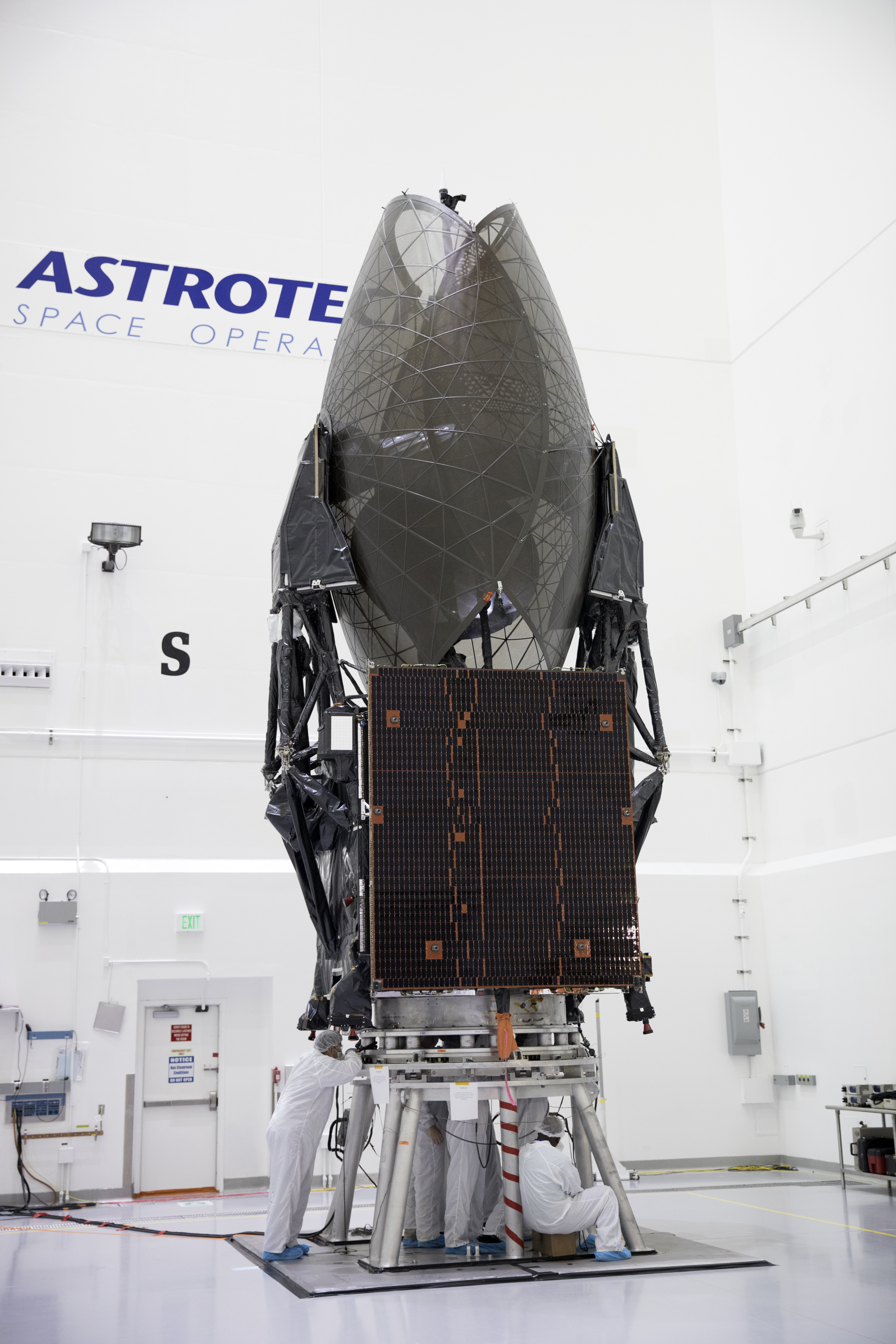
- TDRS-M, the last satellite based on the Boeing-601
- Manufacturer: Boeing

Production
- Status: In service
- On order: 84
- Launched: 76
- Lost: 8
- Maiden launch: Optus B1 13 August 1992
- Last launch: TDRS-M 18 August 2017

Related spacecraft
- Derivatives: Boeing 601HP

The Boeing 601 (sometimes referred to as the BSS-601, and previously as the HS-601) is a retired communications satellite bus designed in 1985 and introduced in 1987 by Hughes Space and Communications Company. The series was extremely popular in the 1990s, with more than 84 purchased by customers globally. The more advanced 601HP derivative (for "high power") was introduced in 1995. Hughes, and the 601 platforms, were acquired by Boeing in 2000.

The last commercial 601 satellite was ordered in 2001 and launched in 2004. The NASA Space Communications and Navigation (SCaN) Program Office in December 2007 selected the BSS-601HP for its third generation TDRS spacecraft, adding the two 15-foot (4.5m) diameter steerable antennas. The TDRS-M satellite, launched on August 18, 2017, became the last 601 satellite to reach orbit.

== Background ==
The Boeing-601 model was Hughes’ first major design and development for a communications satellite with three-axis, or body stabilization. All previous Hughes satellite models (HS-376) had been cylindrical spacecraft that were spin-stabilized at 50 revolutions per minute. Design of the Boeing-601 began in 1985, with full-scale development following two years later. The new satellite's first official public presentation took place at the Telecom 87 conference in Geneva, Switzerland.

== Variants ==
Boeing-601HP
A high-power version of the standard model Boeing-601, it supports up to 60 transponders and 10,000 watts, making it twice as powerful as the standard 601. Innovations in gallium arsenide solar cells, battery technology, and xenon ion propulsion systems (XIPS) facilitated this upgrade. The 601HP made its debut in 1995, with upgrades in 2000 to address design and component failures.
Ultra High Frequency Follow On (UFO)
The U.S. Navy began replacing and upgrading its ultra-high frequency (UHF) satellite communications network during the 1990s with a constellation of customized HS-601 satellites known as the UFO (Ultra High Frequency Follow On) series. Eleven UFO satellites were launched between 1993 and 2003. The UHF Follow-On constellation replaced the Fleet Satellite Communications (FLTSATCOM) and the Hughes-built Leasat spacecraft.
Third generation GOES satellites
The Geostationary Operational Environmental Satellite system (GOES), operated by NOAA, selected the standard Boeing 601 bus for its third generation weather satellites, GOES-13, GOES-14, and GOES-15. This series featured a sun-pointed extreme ultraviolet sensor, a Solar X-Ray Imager (SXI), and space environment monitoring (SEM) instruments for their space weather role.
Tracking and Data Relay Satellite (TDRS)
The second generation satellites (3) used the standard 601 bus, while the follow-on third generation satellites (3) use the 601HP bus, after design changes addressing satellite failures in 1990s. The TDRS version features two 15-foot-diameter steerable graphite composite mesh antennas. These antennas are partially curled-up like a taco shell to fit within the Atlas/Centaur payload fairing.

== Design ==
=== Structure ===
The 601 bus is divided into two modules. The first module houses the propulsion system, batteries, and electronics for the bus, and bears launch vehicle loads. The second module contains shelves carrying the communications equipment, payload electronics, and heat pipes. Solar arrays, reflectors, and antenna feeds are mounted to the payload module.

=== Payload ===
The standard 601 platform supports up to 48 transponders and provides up to 4,800 watts of power. The 601HP supports up to 60 transponders and provides up to 10,000 watts.

== Failures ==
A significant number of Boeing 601s have experienced failures in orbit, some resulting in complete failure of the satellite.

=== Spacecraft Control Processor (SCP) ===
An unconfirmed number of 601s launched prior to August 1997 have a design flaw in their SCPs, where a tin-plated relay forms crystalline "whiskers" under certain specific conditions. These whiskers eventually caused an electrical short. Each satellite contains two SCPs and the backup unit will take control in the event of a failure of the primary unit. In some cases, both SCPs have failed, rendering the spacecraft unusable. A notable example was the Galaxy IV satellite. At least eight 601s have experienced SCP failures; four of which were double failures resulting in total loss of the satellite. Hughes switched to nickel plating on later 601s to resolve this problem, at the expense of payload weight.

=== Batteries ===
Some 601HPs have experienced problems with their batteries, resulting in a reduction of eclipse protection. This would require some transponders to be shut down during eclipse periods.

=== Xenon Ion Propulsion System (XIPS) ===
Some Boeing-601 satellites featured the optional electronic propulsion system, called Xenon Ion Propulsion System or XIPS, for station keeping. At least four satellites with XIPS propulsion have experienced partial or total failure of the XIPS system which significantly reduced the lifespan of the satellite.

== Satellites based on the 601 and 601HP ==
Latest operator	Satellites
APT Satellite	Apstar 2 (destroyed in launch accident, January 1995)
Asia Satellite Telecommunications Company	AsiaSat 3S; AsiaSat 4
DirecTV	DIRECTV 1 DIRECTV 2 DIRECTV 3 DIRECTV 1R; DIRECTV 4S
Indosat	Palapa C1 (launched January 1996); Palapa C2 (launched May 1996)
Intelsat	Intelsat 2 (launched July 1994); Intelsat 3R (launched January 1996 as PAS-3R); Galaxy 4R (601HP; launched April 2000; originally operated by PanAmSat, which was later acquired by Intelsat); Intelsat 5 (601HP; launched August 1997; known variously as IS-5, PAS-5, and Arabsat 2C); Intelsat 9 (601HP; launched July 2000 as PAS-9 operated by PanAmSat); Galaxy 10R (601HP; launched January 2000)
JSAT Corporation	JCSAT-3 (launched August 1995); JCSAT-4 (launched February 1997); JCSAT-5 (launched December 1997); JCSAT-4A (launched February 1999; formerly designated JCSAT-6); JCSAT-8 (launched March 2002)
Loral Space & Communications	Orion 3 (601HP; launched May 1999; failed to achieve correct orbit)
MEASAT	MEASAT-3 (launched December 12, 2006)
NASA	TDRS-H (launched June 2000); TDRS-I (launched March 2002); TDRS-J (launched December 2002); TDRS-K (601HP; launched January 2013); TDRS-L (601HP; launched January 2014); TDRS-M (601HP; launched August 2017)
NOAA/NASA	GOES N GOES O GOES P
Optus (formerly AUSSAT)	Optus B1 (launched August 1992); Optus B2 (launched December 1992; launch failure); Optus B3 (launched August 1994)
PanAmSat	Galaxy IIIR; Galaxy IV; Galaxy VI; Galaxy VIR (601HP); Galaxy VIIIi (601HP); Galaxy X (601HP); Galaxy XR (601HP); PAS-2 (launched July 1994); PAS-3 (launched December 1994; launch failure); PAS-3 (spare satellite launched January 1996; re-designated PAS-3); PAS-4 (launched August 1995); PAS-5 (601HP, launched August 1997; first 601 HP to launch); PAS-6B (launched December 1998); PAS-10 (launched May 2001); PAS-22 (launched as AsiaSat 3; later sold to Hughes Communications and re-designated HGS-1; then sold to PanAmSat and re-designated PAS-22)
Pendrell Corporation (formerly ICO Global Communications)	(Twelve satellites in MEO)
Satmex	Solaridad 1 (launched November 1993); Solaridad 2 (launched October 1994); Satmex 5 (601HP; launched December 1998)
SES S.A.	Astra 1C; Astra 1D; Astra 1E; Astra 1F; Astra 1G; Astra 2A; Astra 1H; Astra 2C; SES-7 (launched May 2009 as ProtoStar 2 for ProtoStar Ltd; later sold to SES)
SKY Perfect JSAT Group (formerly Space Communications Corporation)	Superbird-C (launched July 1997); Superbird-B2 (601HP; launched February 2000; previously designated Superbird-4); Superbird-6 (launched April 2004)
TerreStar Corporation (formerly Motient Corporation, American Mobile Satellite Corporation)	AMSC-1 (launched April 1995)
TMI Communications	MSAT-1 (launched April 1996)
United States Navy	Eleven UHF Follow-On spacecraft designated F1-F11 (launched between 1993 and 2003)

== See also ==
- Boeing 702
- Boeing Satellite Development Center
