= SBS 4 =

American geostationary communications satellite

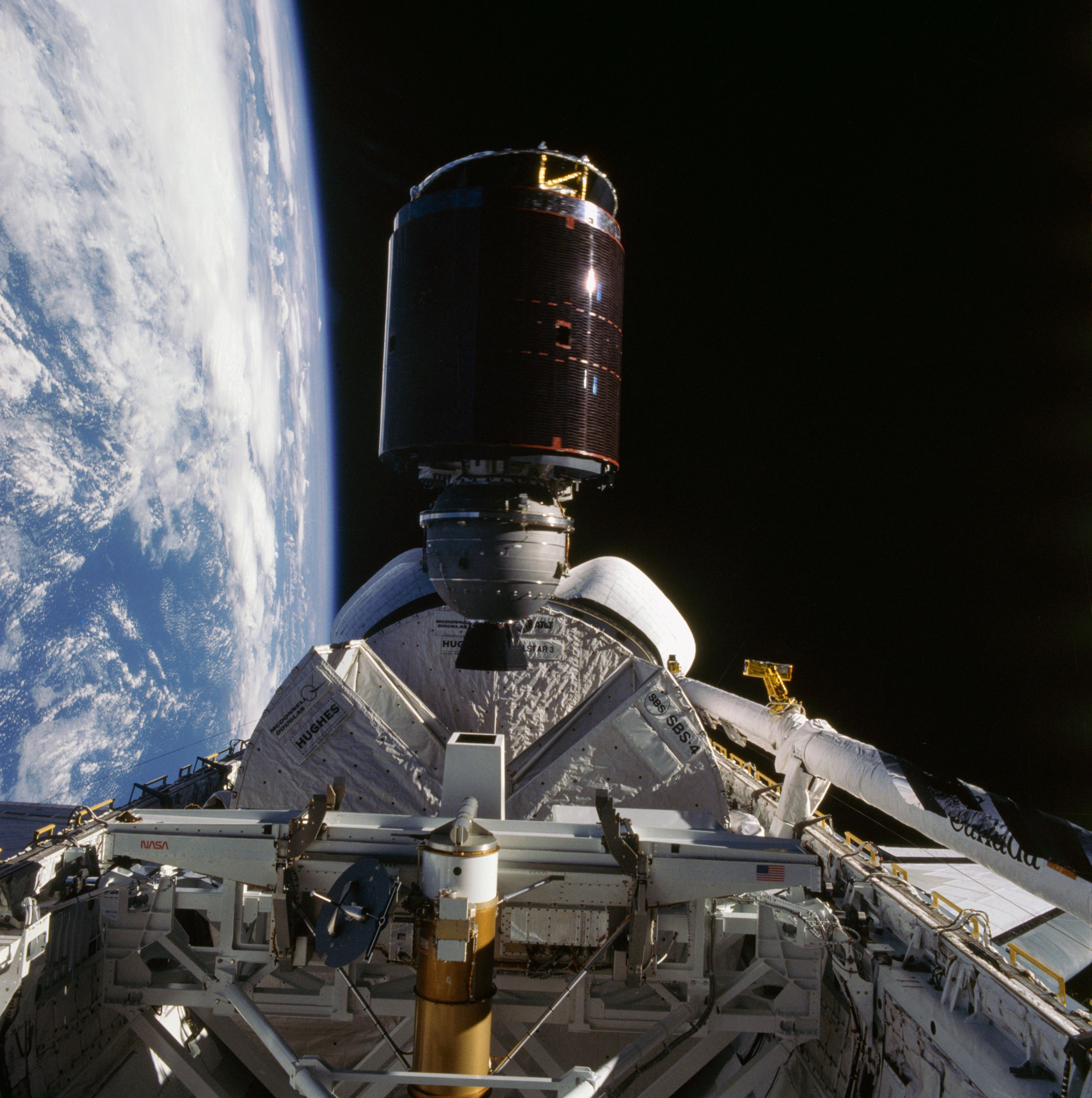
- SBS 4 being deployed from Discovery's payload bay
- Mission type: Communications
- Operator: SBS
- COSPAR ID: 1984-093B
- SATCAT no.: 15235
- Mission duration: 7 years design life

Spacecraft properties
- Bus: HS-376
- Manufacturer: Hughes Space and Communications
- Launch mass: 1,117 kilograms (2,463 lb)

Start of mission
- Launch date: 30 August 1984, 12:41:50 UTC
- Rocket: Space Shuttle Discovery STS-41D
- Launch site: Kennedy LC-39A
- Contractor: NASA

End of mission
- Disposal: Decommissioned
- Deactivated: September 29, 2005

Orbital parameters
- Reference system: Geocentric
- Regime: Geostationary
- Longitude: 94° W
- Eccentricity: 0.72775
- Perigee altitude: 317 kilometres (197 mi)
- Apogee altitude: 36,137 kilometres (22,454 mi)
- Inclination: 23°
- Period: 640.2 minutes
- Epoch: August 30, 1984

Transponders
- Band: 14 Ku band

SBS 4 was a geostationary communications satellite designed and manufactured by Hughes (now Boeing) on the HS-376 platform. It was ordered by Satellite Business Systems, which later sold it to Hughes Communications. It had a K_{u} band payload and operated at 94°W longitude.

== Satellite description ==
The spacecraft was designed and manufactured by Hughes on the HS-376 satellite bus. It had a launch mass of 1,117 kg (2,463 lb), a geostationary orbit and a 7-year design life.

== History ==
On August 30, 1984, SBS 4 was launched by Space Shuttle Discovery during the mission STS-41-D from Kennedy Space Center at 12:41:50 UTC. The satellite was launched along with the satellites Telstar 302 and Leasat F2.

On 29 September 2005, SBS 4 was finally decommissioned and put into a graveyard orbit.

== See also ==
- 1984 in spaceflight
