= GOES 14 =

NOAA weather satellite

GOES-14
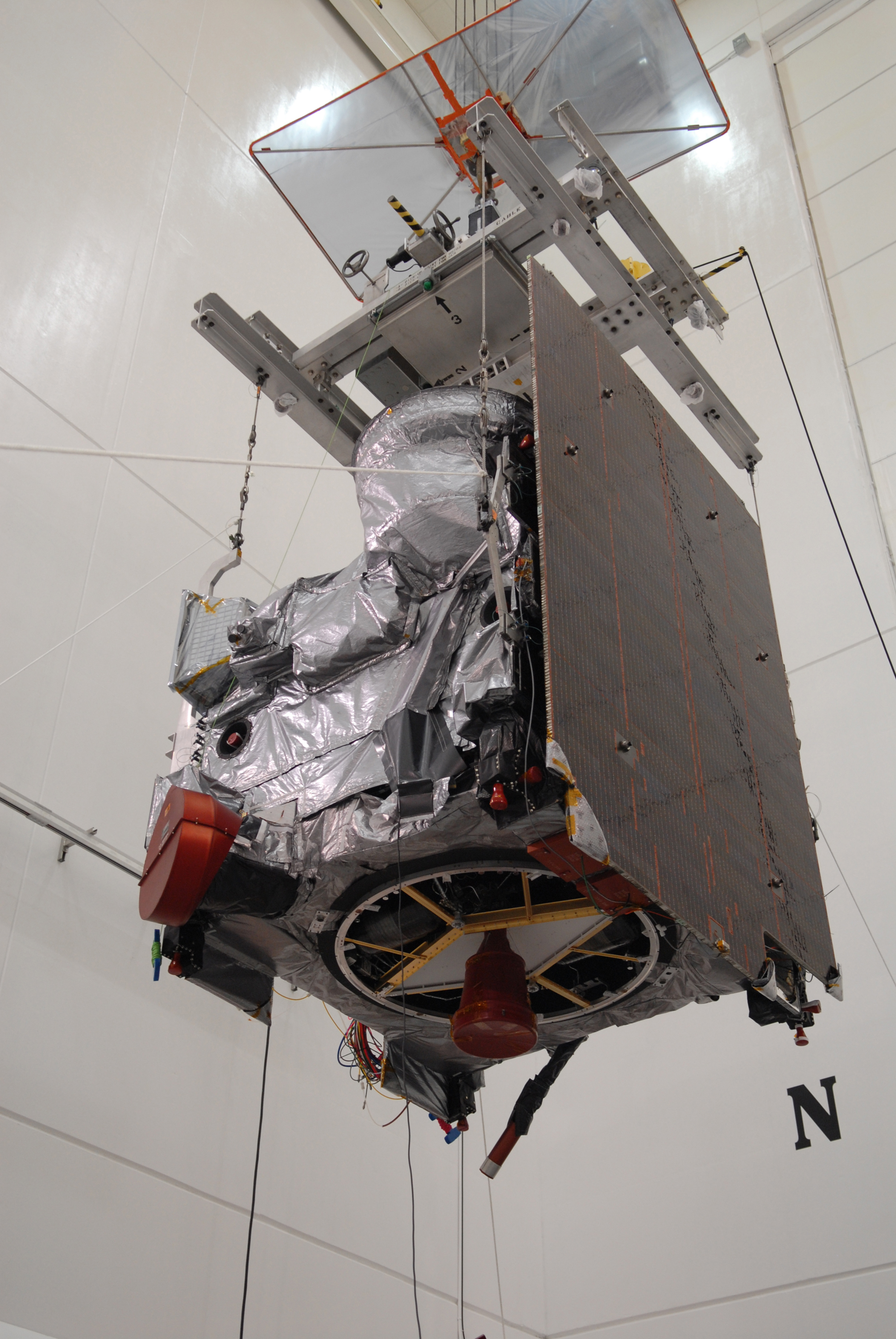
- GOES-14 during pre-launch processing
- Mission type: Weather satellite
- Operator: NOAA / NASA
- COSPAR ID: 2009-033A
- SATCAT no.: 35491
- Mission duration: Elasped: 17 years, 3 months and 24 days

Spacecraft properties
- Spacecraft type: GOES-N series
- Bus: BSS-601
- Manufacturer: Boeing, ITT Corporation
- Launch mass: 3,133 kilograms (6,907 lb)
- Power: 2.3 kilowatts from solar array

Start of mission
- Launch date: 27 June 2009, 22:51 UTC
- Rocket: Delta IV-M+(4,2)
- Launch site: Cape Canaveral SLC-37B
- Contractor: United Launch Alliance

Orbital parameters
- Reference system: Geocentric
- Regime: Geostationary
- Longitude: 105° West
- Eccentricity: 0.0003154
- Perigee altitude: 35,773 kilometres (22,228 mi)
- Apogee altitude: 35,800 kilometres (22,200 mi)
- Inclination: 0.2184°
- Period: 1,437 minutes
- Geostationary Operational Environmental Satellite

GOES-14, known as GOES-O prior to reaching its operational orbit, is an American weather satellite, which is part of the US National Oceanic and Atmospheric Administration (NOAA)'s Geostationary Operational Environmental Satellite (GOES) system. The spacecraft was built by Boeing and is based on the BSS-601 bus. It is the second of three GOES satellites to use the BSS-601 bus, after GOES-13, which was launched in May 2006.

It was launched by United Launch Alliance aboard a Delta IV-M+(4,2) rocket at 22:51 UTC on 27 June 2009, from Space Launch Complex 37B at the Cape Canaveral Air Force Station. Upon reaching geostationary orbit, on 7 July, it was redesignated GOES-14. It underwent a 6-month series of post-launch tests before completing its "check-out" phase and then was placed into "orbital storage mode" or stand-by. Its first full disk image was sent on 27 July 2009.

GOES-14 was brought out of storage and began one-minute rapid scans of Tropical Storm Isaac on 24 August 2012. On 24 September 2012, it temporarily assumed the role of GOES-East after GOES-13 experienced technical difficulties. On 1 October 2012, it began moving East at a rate of 0.9° per day to an ultimate geosynchronous position of 75° West longitude to better cover the Atlantic basin during troubleshooting and repair of GOES-13. GOES-13 was returned to service on 18 October 2012.

GOES-14 was used to monitor Hurricane Sandy in parallel with the repaired GOES-13 and was returned to storage again on February 13, 2013. GOES-14 was again reactivated on 23 May 2013 when a tiny meteorite struck GOES-13 and tilted it out of alignment. GOES-14 operated from its storage location for about 3 weeks while operators got GOES-13 back online.

GOES-14 was to be powered off and placed into storage on 29 February 2020. It can be called back into service if needed.

== Launch ==
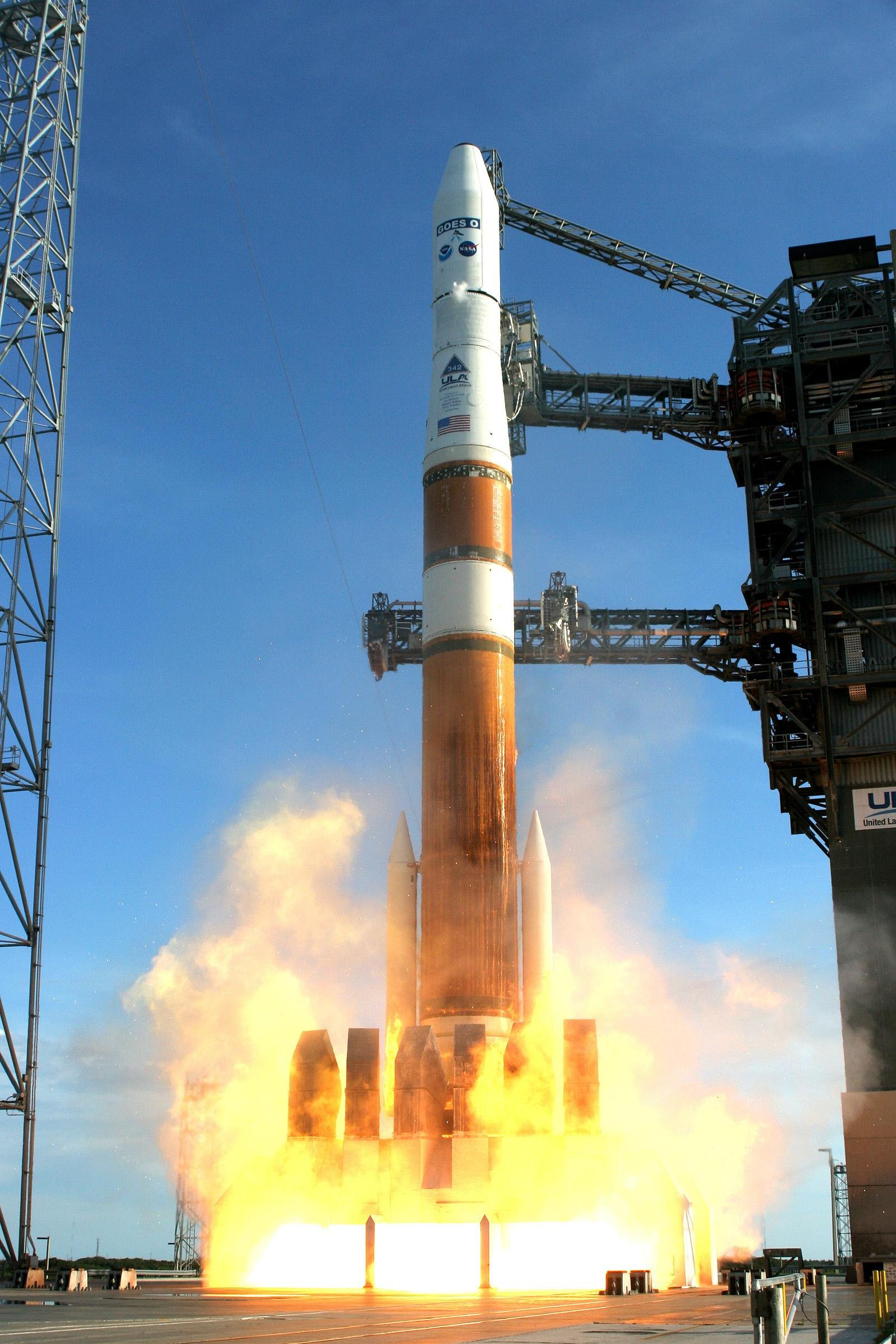
Launch of GOES-14

The Animation of GOES-14's trajectory. GOES-14 · Earth

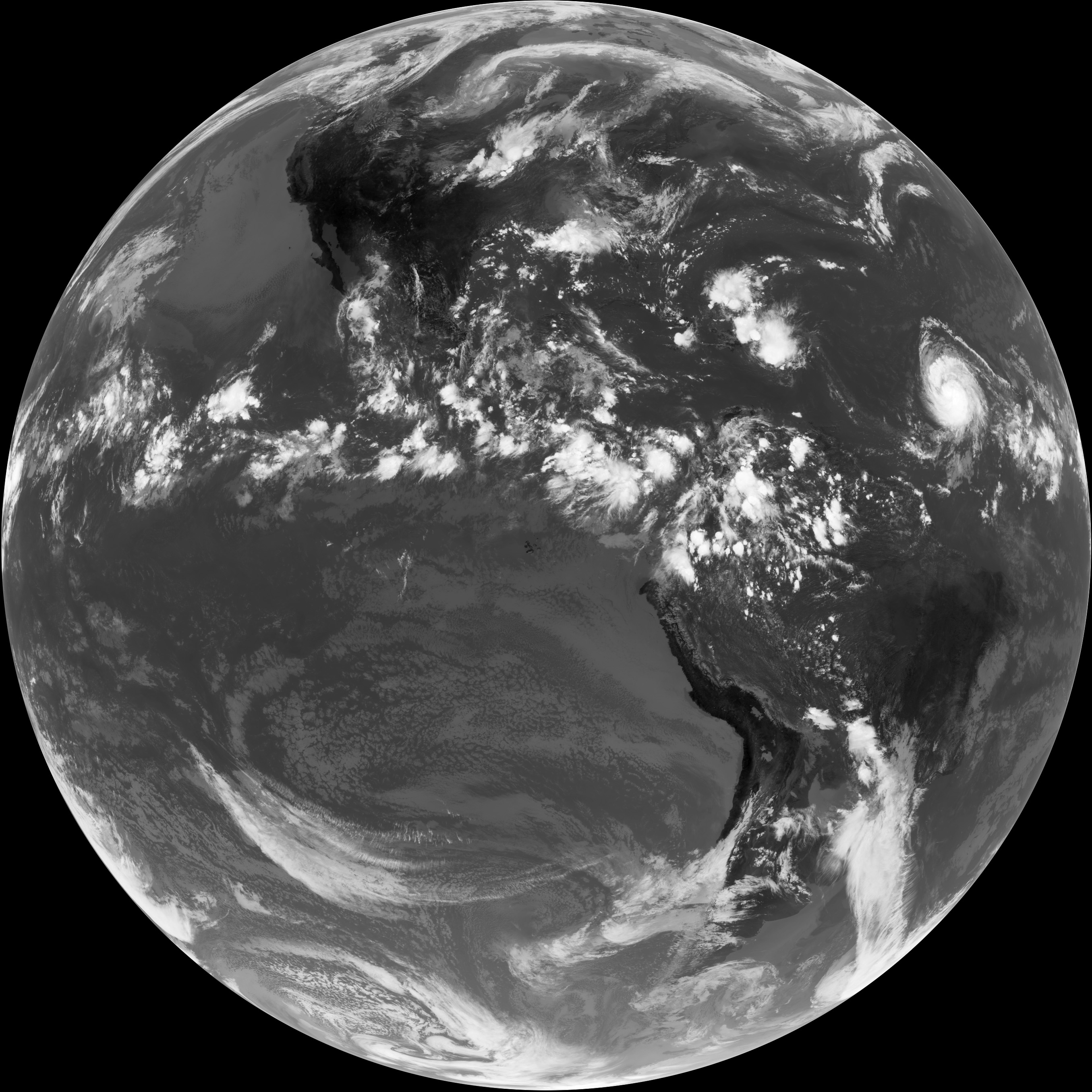
This is the first full-disk thermal infrared (IR) image taken by GOES-14.

The first attempt to launch GOES-O was made on 26 June 2009, during a launch window running from 22:14-23:14 UTC (18:14-19:14 EDT). Due to rain and lightning at the launch site, the launch was delayed from the start of the window to 22:44 UTC, and once this passed, it was reset to the end of the window. At 22:59 UTC, the launch was scrubbed after field mills detected an unacceptably strong electrical field in the atmosphere, and fifteen minutes would have been required from this clearing in order to launch - longer than remained of the launch window. The weather satellite was eventually launched on 27 June 2009 22:51 UTC (16:51 EDT).

Attempt	Planned	Result	Turnaround	Reason	Decision point	Weather go (%)	Notes
1	26 Jun 2009, 10:14:00 pm	scrubbed	—	weather (lightning)	26 Jun 2009, 10:44 pm		
2	27 Jun 2009, 10:51:00 pm	success	1 day 0 hours 37 minutes				

== See also ==
- Geostationary Operational Environmental Satellite
- National Oceanic and Atmospheric Administration
- NASA
