= Satellite Business Systems =

Satellite communications company

- Industry: Satellite communication
- Founded: December 15, 1975
- Headquarters: McLean, Virginia, US
- Owner: IBM, Aetna and COMSAT

Satellite Business Systems (SBS) was a company founded by IBM, Aetna, COMSAT (and later wholly purchased by IBM and then subsequently sold to MCI), that provided private professional satellite communications through its SBS fleet of FSS geosynchronous satellites, and was the first company to do so.

SBS was founded on December 15, 1975 by the aforementioned companies with the goal of providing a digital satellite communications network for business and other professional clients.

== History ==
=== The start of SBS (1970-1979) ===
In late 1970, MCI Communications created a subsidiary company named MCI Satellite, Inc. The idea was that satellites could provide 'long distance' service from anywhere to anywhere without having to build thousands of miles of terrestrial network facilities. In early 1971, MCI and Lockheed Missiles and Space Company created a joint venture named MCI Lockheed Satellite Corp. which was the first company to request FCC authorization as a Specialized Common Carrier using satellite based communications. A year later, MCI and Lockheed sought an additional source of funding and Comsat Corp. entered the venture, which was renamed CML Satellite Corp. In need of cash, MCI sold its share of the venture to IBM Corporation in 1974, and Lockheed also subsequently sold its share to IBM.

In 1975, the FCC required IBM and Comsat to find a third partner to develop SBS. IBM approached Aetna Insurance Company mid-1975, and Aetna took 15% of the equity. Comsat, IBM, Aetna Life, and Casualty Co. formed Satellite Business Systems (SBS) in 1975, with IBM owning one third of the company. The business plan was originally to specialize in high-speed data transfer for large corporations - SBS later began focusing its marketing on voice over data. In July 1979, Robert C. Hall began heading SBS.

=== Launch of first SBS satellites (1980-1983) ===
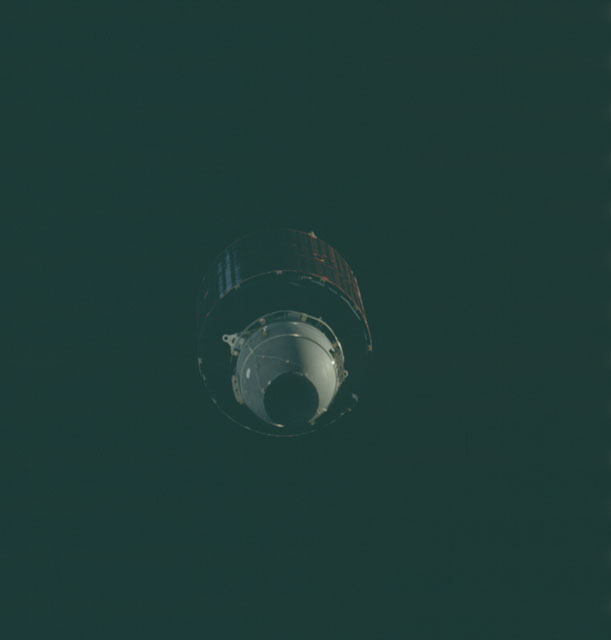
SBS-3 in orbit in late November 1982

The Satellite Business Systems satellite was developed by IBM, Aetna, and Comsat, and manufactured by the Hughes Space and Communications Company. In Nov. 1980, SBS 1 was launched from Cape Canaveral by NASA. In the early 1980s, NASA launched several SBS satellites, including with the Columbia Space Shuttle . After the 1980 launch of its satellite, SBS began offering private satellite communication systems to large corporations in March 1981. By June 1981, Aetna was installing Earth stations to process the satellite data in Chicago, Hartford, San Francisco, and Houston, and to handle voice traffic for 30 cities.

In Jan. 1983 it expanded into the residential market. In May 1983, Rupert Murdoch's News Satellite Television company signed a $75 million lease for TV channels on an SBS satellite, to be called Skyband. The rollout was delayed in Nov. SBS lost $122 million in 1981, $123 mill. in 1982, and also lost over $100 mill. in 1983. By 1984, it had three satellites in orbit, but only 22 corporate customers for its main business. It served around 100,000 residential customers. "Plagued by deficits," in Jan. 1984 SBS replaced Robert C. Hall as president with Stephen B. Schwartz of IBM. Hall had been president since 1979, and became the company's first chairman.

=== The end of SBS and sale of satellites (1984-1990) ===
In March 1984, after losing $360 million in three years, SBS said it would cut its staff by 14%. According to the New York Times, the satellite industry was suffering "transponder glut" with too little uptake from consumers, and three SBS satellites were among the most underutilized satellites.

In July 1984, Comsat announced it was selling its interest in SBS. A month later, SBS announced it was selling all of its space on its satellites, with 10 transponders on SBS 4 sold to Salomon Brothers and other investors, who would then lease capacity back to SBS for $19 million a year for seven years. SBS' stated goal was to raise $100 mill.

In late 1984, Marvin Mann was appointed president and CEO, managing the company and years later, overseeing its sale and merger with MCI Corporation.

Acquiring a stake in MCI in the process, in June 1985, IBM sold its shares in SBS to MCI Communications, equating to 60%. The other 40% was owned by Aetna. At the time, SBS had 200,000 customers, with projected 1985 revenue at $500 mill. MCI migrated the voice and data traffic of most SBS customers to its terrestrial network. During the sale of SBS to MCI, four satellites (SBS 1-4) were then in orbit.

In 1987, SBS' fleet was sold off. SBS 1 and 2 were sold to Comsat, SBS 3 remained with MCI, and SBS 4 was sold to IBM's Satellite Transponder Leasing Corporation (STLC) together with the SBS 5 and 6 satellites, which were then still on the ground. In April 1990, Hughes Communications Inc (HCI), a subsidiary of Hughes Aircraft (who built the satellites) bought STLC from IBM.

Sometime later (possibly around 1992) SBS 3 was sold to Comsat. Comsat was later bought by Lockheed Martin. Due to the divestiture of its fleet (to MCI & HCI, and to Comsat and IBM as well, the former founders of SBS), SBS no longer exists as an entity, with the last satellite left of its fleet, SBS 6, being decommissioned in July 2007 and last being owned by Intelsat.

== Marketing ==
According to Science, SBS undertook a "4-year marketing blitz" towards the largest 300 American corporations, but could only "come up with nine customers" willing to pay the $108,000 monthly subscription fee. Companies were unsure how to "effectively use the raw data" offered by the SBS network, and SBS began focusing on manufacturing products to help customers navigate the technology. It also began marketing to smaller businesses and retail customers.

The original concept was for a large corporation to install SBS earth stations at each of its major sites. This strategy limited SBS' addressable market to corporations with enough concentrated voice and data traffic to justify the installation of multiple earth stations. Earth stations were generally not shared by SBS customers.

Although the SBS technology provided switched digital, leased digital, switched analog, and leased analog connections between a customer's earth stations, most customers used it mainly for intra-corporate voice calls. Data communications protocols of the period were not efficient over satellite links.

One SBS customer, ISACOMM, extended the business model to smaller corporate customers and provided offnet connectivity as well.

The high initial costs of deploying earth stations, along with the rapid success and expansion of terrestrial competitors like MCI and Sprint, prevented SBS from attaining its commercial targets. Excess transponders on SBS satellites were leased to other companies, and SBS adopted some of ISACOMM's marketing tactics and even pursued the consumer long-distance market on a limited basis.

== Technology ==
SBS' fleet of satellites were the first in orbit to offer transponders in the K_{u} band, meaning that smaller, less expensive dishes and equipment could be used to receive and transmit to the satellites, making SBS' satellite system attractive for business customers. This was opposed to then-current satellites using the C band of RF spectrum, requiring a larger (and more costly) dish 8 feet (and up) in size. However, K_{u} signals suffered more from rain fade.

The SBS Earth station was designed by IBM. It consisted of a highly modified IBM 1800 and a TDMA modem. All earth stations were managed from the SBS central network operations facility located in McLean, VA, which was also the headquarters location for the corporation.

=== NASA Space Shuttle ===
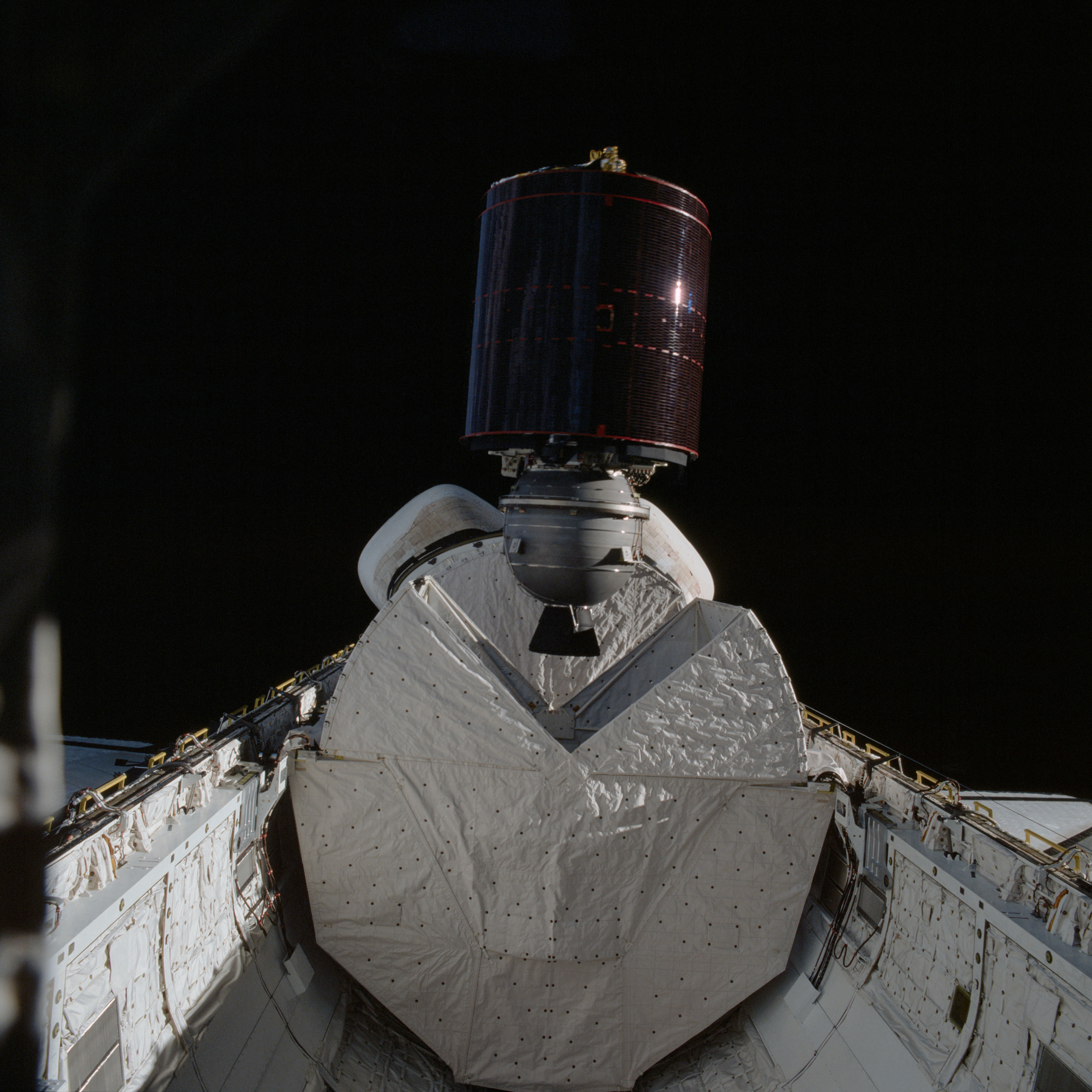
SBS-3 satellite with PAM-D stage inside the Space Shuttle

The first use of the NASA Shuttle for commercial purposes was the deployment of the SBS 3 satellite in November, 1982 from STS-5. SBS engineers designed the cradle that sat in the cargo bay of the shuttle and spun up to 50 RPM, then ejected the spinning satellite with the use of explosive bolts.

=== SBS satellites in orbit ===
Through its existence as a company, SBS had six satellites in orbit:

Satellite	Launch (UTC)	Rocket	Launch site	Fate	Out of Service	Remarks	COSPAR ID
SBS 1	1980-11-15; 22:49	Delta 3914	Canaveral LC-17A	Retired	November 1990		1980-091A
SBS 2	1981-09-24; 23:09	Delta 3910	Canaveral LC-17A	Retired	September 1996		1981-096A
SBS 3	1982-11-11; 12:19	Space Shuttle Columbia	Kennedy LC-39A	Retired	June 1995	First commercial satellite launched by Space Shuttle	1982-110B
SBS 4	1984-08-31; 12:41	Space Shuttle Discovery	Kennedy LC-39A	Retired	September 2005		1984-093B
SBS 5	1988-09-08; 23:00	Ariane 3	Kourou ELA-2	Retired	March 2000		1988-081B
SBS 6	1990-10-12; 22:58	Ariane 4	Kourou ELA-2	Retired	April 2009		1990-091A

SBS 1-5 were built by Hughes using the HS-376 platform. SBS-6 used the HS-393 platform.

SBS 1-6 are no longer in service and have been placed in graveyard orbits. SBS-6 was the last SBS satellite in operation at 74 degrees west longitude. It was decommissioned in July 2007 and replaced by Intelsat Galaxy 17.
