= SBS 2 (satellite) =

Geostationary communications satellite

- Mission type: Communications
- Operator: SBS
- COSPAR ID: 1981-096A
- SATCAT no.: 12855
- Mission duration: 7 years design life

Spacecraft properties
- Bus: HS-376
- Manufacturer: Hughes Space and Communications
- Launch mass: 550 kilograms (1,210 lb)

Start of mission
- Launch date: 24 September 1981, 23:09 UTC
- Rocket: Delta-3910 PAM-D
- Launch site: Cape Canaveral LC-17A
- Contractor: NASA

End of mission
- Disposal: Decommissioned
- Deactivated: September 1996

Orbital parameters
- Reference system: Geocentric
- Regime: Geostationary
- Longitude: 117° W
- Eccentricity: 0.73679
- Perigee altitude: 166 kilometres (103 mi)
- Apogee altitude: 36,830 kilometres (22,890 mi)
- Inclination: 27.7°
- Period: 650.8 minutes
- Epoch: September 24, 1981

Transponders
- Band: 14 Ku band

SBS 2 was a geostationary communications satellite designed and manufactured by Hughes (now Boeing) on the HS-376 platform. It was ordered by Satellite Business Systems, which later sold it to Hughes Communications. It had a K_{u} band payload and operated on the 117°W longitude.

== Satellite description ==
The spacecraft was designed and manufactured by Hughes on the HS-376 satellite bus. It had a launch mass of 550 kg (1,210 lb), a geostationary orbit and a 7-year design life.

== History ==
On September 24, 1981, SDS 2 was finally launched by a Delta-3910 PAM-D from Cape Canaveral at 23:09 UTC.

In April 1996, SDS 2 finally decommissioned and put on a graveyard orbit.

== See also ==
- 1981 in spaceflight
