= Galaxy 5 =

Communications satellite

Coordinates: 0°N 176°E

- Mission type: Communications
- Operator: PanAmSat
- COSPAR ID: 1992-013A
- SATCAT no.: 21906
- Mission duration: 15 years

Spacecraft properties
- Bus: HS-376
- Manufacturer: Hughes
- Launch mass: 1,412 kilograms (3,113 lb)

Start of mission
- Launch date: 14 March 1992, 00:00 UTC
- Rocket: Atlas I
- Launch site: Cape Canaveral LC-36B

End of mission
- Deactivated: January 2005

Orbital parameters
- Reference system: Geocentric
- Regime: Geostationary
- Longitude: 176° E

Transponders
- Band: 24 C-band; 0 Ku-band
- Coverage area: North America

Galaxy 5 was a communications satellite operated by PanAmSat from 1992 to 2005. It spent most of its operational life at an orbital location of 176° E. Galaxy 5 was launched on March 14, 1992, with an Atlas launch vehicle from Cape Canaveral Air Force Station, Florida, United States, and covered North America with twenty-four transponders each on the C- and zero in K_{u} band.

Galaxy 5 was retired in January 2005.

== Specifications ==
- Apogee: 36,134.7 kilometers (22,453.1 mi)
- Perigee: 36,006.9 kilometers (22,373.7 mi)
- Orbital inclination: 10.3°
- Semimajor axis: 42,441 kilometers (26,372 mi)
- Orbital period: 1,450.3 minutes
- Propulsion: Star-30C
- Power: Solar cells
