= Galaxy 3C =

Communications satellite

Coordinates: 0°N 95°W

- Mission type: Communications
- Operator: PanAmSat / Intelsat
- COSPAR ID: 2002-030A
- SATCAT no.: 27445
- Mission duration: 15 years (planned); 22 years, 8 months, 18 days (in progress)

Spacecraft properties
- Bus: BSS-702
- Manufacturer: Boeing Satellite Systems
- Launch mass: 4,860 kilograms (10,710 lb)
- Dry mass: 2,873 kilograms (6,334 lb)
- Power: 15 kW

Start of mission
- Launch date: 15 June 2002, 22:39:30 UTC
- Rocket: Zenit-3SL
- Launch site: Sea Launch

Orbital parameters
- Reference system: Geocentric
- Regime: Geostationary
- Longitude: 95° west

Transponders
- Band: 24 C-band; 16 Ku-band
- Coverage area: North America, Canada, United States & Mexico

Galaxy 3C (or Galaxy 13) is a communications satellite operated by PanAmSat from 2000 to 2006, and by Intelsat from 2006 to today. It spent most of its operational life at an orbital location of 95° W. Galaxy 3C was launched on June 15, 2002, with a Зенит 3SL Zenit launch vehicle, from 154°w, 00°s, and covered North America & S. America (optional) with twenty-four transponders each on the C- and sixteen in K_{u} band.
