= SBS 1 =

Geostationary communications satellite

- Mission type: Communications
- Operator: SBS
- COSPAR ID: 1980-091A
- SATCAT no.: 12065
- Mission duration: 7 years design life

Spacecraft properties
- Bus: HS-376
- Manufacturer: Hughes Space and Communications
- Launch mass: 550 kilograms (1,210 lb)

Start of mission
- Launch date: 15 November 1980, 22:49 UTC
- Rocket: Delta-3910 PAM-D
- Launch site: Cape Canaveral LC-17A
- Contractor: NASA

End of mission
- Disposal: Decommissioned
- Deactivated: June 1990

Orbital parameters
- Reference system: Geocentric
- Regime: Geostationary
- Longitude: 149° W
- Eccentricity: 0.7415
- Perigee altitude: 600 kilometres (370 mi)
- Apogee altitude: 40,662 kilometres (25,266 mi)
- Inclination: 62.8°
- Period: 736.2 minutes
- Epoch: November 15, 1980

Transponders
- Band: 14 Ku band

SBS 1 was a geostationary communications satellite designed and manufactured by Hughes (now Boeing) on the HS-376 platform. It was ordered by Satellite Business Systems, which later sold it to Hughes Communications. It had a K_{u} band payload and operated on the 149°W longitude.

== Satellite description ==
The spacecraft was designed and manufactured by Hughes on the HS-376 satellite bus. It had a launch mass of 550 kg (1,210 lb), a geostationary orbit and a 7-year design life.

== History ==
On November 15, 1980, SBS 1 was launched by a Delta-3910 PAM-D from Cape Canaveral at 22:49 UTC.

In June 1990, SBS 1 was finally decommissioned and put into a graveyard orbit.

== See also ==
- 1980 in spaceflight
