= SBS 6 (satellite) =

American telecommunications satellite

- Mission type: Communication
- Operator: Intelsat
- COSPAR ID: 1990-091A
- SATCAT no.: 20872

Spacecraft properties
- Spacecraft: SBS 6
- Bus: HS-393
- Manufacturer: Hughes
- Launch mass: 2,478 kg (5,463 lb)
- BOL mass: 1,484 kg (3,272 lb)
- Dimensions: 3.7 m × 10 m × 2.3 m (12.1 ft × 32.8 ft × 7.5 ft) with solar panels and antennas deployed.
- Power: 2.2 kW

Start of mission
- Launch date: 22:58, October 12, 1990 (UTC)
- Rocket: Ariane 44L
- Launch site: Kourou ELA-2
- Contractor: Arianespace

End of mission
- Disposal: placed in a graveyard orbit
- Deactivated: April 2009

Orbital parameters
- Reference system: Geocentric
- Regime: Inclined geosynchronous
- Semi-major axis: 42527 km
- Perigee altitude: 36,127.3 km
- Apogee altitude: 36,186.6 km
- Inclination: 7.3°
- Period: 1,454.7 minutes
- Epoch: 00:00:00 2016-08-17

Transponders
- Band: K_{u} band: 19 × 45 Mhz />
- Bandwidth: 855 MHz
- Coverage area: Continental United States
- TWTA power: 41 Watts

SBS 6 was a geostationary communications satellite designed and manufactured by Hughes (now Boeing) on the HS-393 platform. It was originally ordered by Satellite Business Systems, which later sold it to Hughes Communications and was last used by Intelsat. It had a K_{u} band payload and operated on the 95°W longitude.

== Satellite description ==
The spacecraft was designed and manufactured by Hughes on the HS-393 satellite bus. It had a launch mass of 2,478 kg (5,463 lb), a mass of 1,500 kg (3,300 lb) after reaching geostationary orbit and an 8-year design life. When stowed for launch, its dimensions were 3.4 m (11 ft) long and 3.7 m (12 ft) in diameter.

With its solar panels fully extended it spanned 10 m (33 ft). Its power system generated approximately 2,350 Watts of power thanks to two cylindrical solar panels. It also had a two 38Ah NiH_{2} batteries. These panels used K7 and K4-3/4 solar cells and were more than twice the number than on the HS-376.

Its propulsion system was composed of two R-4D LAE with a thrust of 490 N (110 lb_{f}). It also used two axial and four radial 22 N (4.9 lb_{f}) bipropellant thrusters for station keeping and attitude control. It included enough propellant for orbit circularization and 8 years of operation.

Its payload was composed of a 2.4 m (7 ft 10 in) multi horn antenna by thirty 45 MHz K_{u} band transponders, of which 19 were active and 11 spares. It had a total active bandwidth of 855 MHz. The K_{u} band transponders had a TWTA output power of 41 Watts. It also had an omnidirectional command and telemetry antenna.

== History ==
In 1985 Satellite Business Systems decided to order a more powerful satellite than the HS-376 based previous satellites. Thus, it ordered the HS-393 based SBS 6 from Hughes, becoming the first customer of the platform.

On October 12, 1990, SBS 6 was finally launched by an Ariane 44L from Kourou ELA-2 at 22:58 UTC.

In April 2009, SBS 6 finally decommissioned and put on a graveyard orbit.
