= Galaxy IV =

Defunct communications satellite

- Mission type: Communications
- COSPAR ID: 1993-039A
- SATCAT no.: 22694

Spacecraft properties
- Bus: HS-601
- Manufacturer: Hughes

Start of mission
- Launch date: June 24 1993
- Rocket: Ariane 42P
- Launch site: Kourou ELA-2
- Contractor: Arianespace

Transponders
- Band: 24 C-band; 24 Ku-band

Galaxy IV was a model HS-601 satellite built by Hughes Space and Communications Company (HSC). The satellite, which carried a payload of both C band and K_{u} band transponders, was launched on June 24, 1993 and operated by PanAmSat Corporation. It was in geostationary orbit at 99°W.

== Failure ==
Control of Galaxy IV was lost on May 19, 1998 when the satellite's primary control processor failed. The backup control processor had suffered a previously undetected anomaly, and PanAmSat was not able to regain control of the spacecraft. Galaxy IV was declared a loss on May 20, 1998. Failure of the primary control processor was attributed to tin whisker growth, a phenomenon in which tendrils grow from solder, causing an electrical short circuit. Engineers believe that a hole developed in the conformal wax coating over the solder, allowing whiskers to develop. The satellite manufacturer, Hughes, has replaced pure tin plating with nickel to alleviate the problem in newer designs, adding 100 to 200 pounds (50 to 90 kg) per payload.

The loss of this satellite was very disruptive to telecommunications in the United States. 80% of pager service in the U.S. went down; service was not restored until the following day. Many fast-pay gas pumps were not able to verify credit card transactions. Wire news services, like Reuters, were also affected. The TV network CBS had to use alternate means of transmitting its programs. All 600 NPR-affiliated stations (as well as numerous other broadcasters) lost access to current network shows and newscasts.

After the incident, Galaxy IV's assigned orbital slot was briefly occupied by Galaxy 4R, and is now occupied by the Galaxy VI satellite. Galaxy VI's relocation required an emergency order from the FCC, taking one week drift time to change orbit. Galaxy IV remains in space.
