= Galaxy 10R =

Defunct communications satellite

- Mission type: Communication
- Operator: PanAmSat; Intelsat
- COSPAR ID: 2000-002A
- SATCAT no.: 26056
- Mission duration: Planned: 15 years Achieved: 8 years

Spacecraft properties
- Bus: HS-601HP
- Manufacturer: Hughes
- Launch mass: 3,475 kilograms (7,661 lb)

Start of mission
- Launch date: 25 January 2000
- Rocket: Ariane 42L-3
- Launch site: Kourou ELA-2
- Contractor: Arianespace

End of mission
- Disposal: Decommissioned
- Deactivated: June 2008

Orbital parameters
- Reference system: Geocentric
- Regime: Geostationary
- Longitude: 123° West

Galaxy 10R was an American communications satellite which was operated by PanAmSat, and later Intelsat. It was constructed by Hughes and is based on the HS-601HP satellite bus. Launch occurred on 25 January 2000, at 01:04. The launch was contracted by Arianespace, and used an Ariane 4 42L-3 carrier rocket flying from ELA-2 at the Guiana Space Centre.

Galaxy 10R was built to replace the Galaxy 10 satellite, which had been lost in a launch failure on the maiden flight of the Delta III in 1998. It was launched just fourteen months after the contract to build the satellite had been signed, due to Hughes' advance production of components to allow quick production of replacement satellites.

Following its launch and on-orbit testing, it was placed in geostationary orbit at 123° West, from where it provided communications services to North America. It was expected to remain in service for fifteen years, however following a malfunction of its Xenon Ion Propulsion System in August 2004, this was reduced. It was retired to a graveyard orbit in June 2008.
