= ProtoStar =

ProtoStar Ltd was a private company incorporated in Bermuda, with U.S. operations based in San Francisco, California and Asian operations based in Singapore. ProtoStar intended to operate an initial fleet of three geostationary satellites. Two satellites were acquired and launched. ProtoStar's anchor customer, Dish TV India Limited, is the largest direct-to-home television operator in India.

== Bankruptcy and auction ==
ProtoStar Ltd filed for Chapter 11 bankruptcy protection in the United States District Court for the District of Delaware on June 29, 2009.

ProtoStar sought and was made by the bankruptcy court to auction its two satellites to pay its outstanding liabilities. The auction for ProtoStar I was set by the bankruptcy court for October 14, 2009, however the auction was delayed until October 31, 2009, based on interest from 11 different satellite operating companies. The auction was won by Intelsat Corp with a bid of $210M, beating out European rival Eutelsat.

== ProtoStar I ==
The ProtoStar I satellite was built by Space Systems/Loral (SS/L) based on the SS/L 1300 spacecraft design. It was originally built by SS/L as the ChinaSat 8 satellite and scheduled for launch in April 1999 on a Long March 3B rocket. However, the U.S. Department of State blocked its export to China under ITAR regulations. The satellite was placed in storage and sold to ProtoStar in 2006.

On January 5, 2007, SS/L announced that the satellite would be modified to meet ProtoStar's requirements. The fueled satellite weighed 4,100 kilograms (9,000 lb) and will operate in both the Ku band and the C band.

On January 8, 2007 Arianespace announced that ProtoStar had contracted with Arianespace for the launch of ProtoStar I. It was launched aboard an Ariane 5 ECA rocket on July 7, 2008. Post-launch maneuvering of the satellite was performed successfully July 8, 2008., and ProtoStar I was placed into its geostationary orbital location of 98.5 degrees East Longitude.

Following the sale of ProtoStar I in the ProtoStar bankruptcy auction, October 29, 2009, and the completion of the sale with Intelsat, Intelsat renamed the satellite Intelsat 25. Intelsat 25 will serve for African market at 31.5 West orbital location.

== ProtoStar II ==
On January 14, 2008, Boeing announced that the Boeing Satellite Development Center in El Segundo, California would provide a spacecraft based on the Boeing 601HP spacecraft design for use as ProtoStar II. The spacecraft was originally built for PanAmSat (now Intelsat) to be used as Galaxy-8iR, but that contract was terminated November 15, 2002. On May 16, 2009, ProtoStar II was carried to orbit on a Proton rocket provided by International Launch Services.

On June 16, 2009, Boeing announced the successful in-orbit handover of the satellite to ProtoStar Ltd. following successful in-orbit tests.

In December 2009 SES purchased Protostar II at auction for its SES World Skies unit. The purchase price was $185 million.

== Ground control segment ==
The ProtoStar I ground control system is in Singapore and will be operated by SingTel. For ProtoStar II the primary control system will be installed in Indonesia and operated by Indovision, with a backup system integrated into the control system for ProtoStar I. Hardware and software for these systems are being provided by Integral Systems.
