= Satbeams =

- Company type: SPRL (société privée à responsabilité limitée)
- Industry: Digital Media
- Founded: 2008
- Headquarters: Brussels, Belgium
- Products: Web/mobile applications
- Number of employees: < 10

Satbeams is a provider of communications satellite footprints visualization services. Satbeams also provides SatCom equipment installation, maintenance and support services locally across BeNeLux. It was founded in 2008 and incorporated in Belgium since 2011.

Satbeams operates www.satbeams.com and market.satbeams.com web portals with free consolidated information about all the commercial geostationary satellites, their beams, transponders and services and marketplace for SatCom professionals to trade satellite capacity, equipment and services. In addition to web portal Satbeams provides web/mobile applications development, data and satellite capacity analysis, reporting and consulting services.

== History ==
Satbeams was started from the idea to combine the satellite footprints with Google Maps and as a result www.satbeams.com web portal went life in April 2008.

In January 2010, veteran sat-frequency web site SatcoDX was shut down after more than 30 years of being online and in order to maintain the service for SatCom/TV community they redirected traffic to SatBeams.

In 2011, Satbeams SPRL legal entity was formed and started to provide professional services to SatCom industry.

Since that time web portal community has grown over 50,000 members and the site is serving more than 3,000,000 page views per month.

At the end of 2014, Satbeams has launched its mobile application that enables offline access to satellite footprints information.

Satbeams provides the web, information, consulting services to SatCom professional customers as well as Satcom equipment installation, support and maintenance services in BeNeLux.
