= EchoStar XV =

Communications satellite

- Mission type: Communication
- Operator: EchoStar
- COSPAR ID: 2010-034A
- SATCAT no.: 36792
- Mission duration: 15 years planned

Spacecraft properties
- Bus: LS-1300
- Manufacturer: Space Systems/Loral
- Launch mass: 5,521 kilograms (12,172 lb)

Start of mission
- Launch date: 10 July 2010, 18:40:36 UTC
- Rocket: Proton-M/Briz-M
- Launch site: Baikonur 200/39
- Contractor: ILS

Orbital parameters
- Reference system: Geocentric
- Regime: Geostationary
- Longitude: 61.5° West
- Perigee altitude: 35,783 kilometers (22,235 mi)
- Apogee altitude: 35,803 kilometers (22,247 mi)
- Inclination: 0.01 degrees
- Period: 23.93 hours
- Epoch: 24 December 2013, 03:42:24 UTC

Transponders
- Band: 32 J band (IEEE K_{u} band)

EchoStar XV is an American geostationary communications satellite which is operated by EchoStar. It is positioned in geostationary orbit, and located at a longitude of 61.5° West, from where it provides direct broadcasting of high-definition television services to the continental United States and Puerto Rico for Dish Network.

EchoStar XV was built by Space Systems/Loral, and is based on the LS-1300 satellite bus. It is equipped with 32 J band (IEEE K_{u} band) transponders, and at launch it had a mass of 5,521 kilograms (12,172 lb). It has a design life of fifteen years,; however, it is carrying enough fuel for around twenty years of operations. It has a common configuration with EchoStar XI and EchoStar XVI.

The launch of EchoStar XV was conducted by International Launch Services, using a Proton-M carrier rocket with a Briz-M upper stage. The launch occurred from Site 200/39 at the Baikonur Cosmodrome in Kazakhstan, at 18:40 UTC on 10 July 2010. The launch successfully placed EchoStar XV into a geosynchronous transfer orbit. Following separation from the rocket, it manoeuvred into a geostationary orbit with a perigee of 35,781 kilometres (22,233 mi) and an apogee of 35,805 kilometres (22,248 mi).

In January 2025, DISH filed to move EchoStar XV to 119 deg W as they migrate services from EchoStar XIV.

== See also ==
- 2010 in spaceflight
