= Intelsat Americas =

Name for a series of satellites

Intelsat Americas, was the re-designation given to the several Telstar satellites serving North America following their sale to Intelsat by Loral Space & Communications in 2003. On February 1, 2007, they were renamed under the "Galaxy" brand. The Telstar satellites that do not directly serve the United States retained their original Telstar designation.

The following name conversions were applied to the Telstar satellites serving the United States:

- Telstar 5 → Intelsat Americas 5 → Galaxy 25
- Telstar 6 → Intelsat Americas 6 → Galaxy 26
- Telstar 7 → Intelsat Americas 7 → Galaxy 27
- Telstar 8 → Intelsat Americas 8 → Galaxy 28
- Telstar 13 → Intelsat Americas 13 → Galaxy 23
- Intelsat Americas 9, while under construction → was finished and launched as Galaxy 19

== See also ==
- Loral Space & Communications
- Telstar
