= Intelsat 19 =

Communications satellite

- Names: IS-19
- Mission type: Communications
- Operator: Intelsat
- COSPAR ID: 2012-030A
- SATCAT no.: 38356
- Mission duration: 18 years (planned)

Spacecraft properties
- Spacecraft: Intelsat 19
- Spacecraft type: SSL 1300
- Bus: LS-1300
- Manufacturer: Space Systems/Loral
- Launch mass: 5,600 kg (12,300 lb)
- Power: 19.3 kW

Start of mission
- Launch date: 1 June 2012, 05:22:59 UTC
- Rocket: Zenit-3SL
- Launch site: Odyssey, Pacific Ocean
- Contractor: Sea Launch
- Entered service: 13 August 2012

Orbital parameters
- Reference system: Geocentric orbit
- Regime: Geostationary orbit
- Longitude: 166° East

Transponders
- Band: 58 transponders: 24 C-band; 34 Ku-band
- Coverage area: Asia-Pacific; Australia, New Zealand, Southeast Asia, Japan, Western United States

Intelsat 19 is a geostationary communications satellite operated by Intelsat. It was constructed by Space Systems/Loral, based on the LS-1300 satellite bus. It was successfully launched by Sea Launch using a Zenit-3SL launch vehicle on 1 June 2012 at 05:22:59 UTC. Upon entering service it replaced Intelsat 8 at 166° East Longitude.

== Telecommunications and service history ==
Intelsat 19 carries 24 C-band and 34 Ku-band transponders. The C-band payload covers the Asia-Pacific region while the Ku-band transponders provide Direct to Home television to Australia, New Zealand, Southeast Asia, Japan, Western United States. It is expected to operate for eighteen years.

In June 2012, Intelsat 19 successfully transferred to geostationary orbit. All of the satellite's communications antennas were in their operational positions, and the communications payload was being tested. Data received from the satellite indicated that the south solar array was damaged, and that the power available to the satellite will be reduced. In-orbit testing was expected to be completed by mid-July 2012. In July 2012, Intelsat 19 completed its in-orbit testing and the satellite drifted to its final location at 166° East, where it was expected to begin service in mid-August 2012. On 13 August 2012, the satellite entered commercial service as customer traffic previously on Intelsat 8 was transitioned over.

== Solar array deployment failure and recovery ==
Intelsat announced late 1 June 2012 that its South solar array failed to deploy. The failure followed a pressure/vibration anomaly recorded during launch. The only other time this anomaly was observed on the Sea Launch vehicle was during a Estrela do Sul 1 2004 launch which also delivered a payload with solar array damage. Intelsat 19's solar array damage was evident by telemetry – after fairing jettison and before satellite release – during which time the array was exposed to Sun.

The South solar array panel was eventually deployed on 12 June 2012, following four apogee maneuver firings on 11 June 2012, and appears to have lost 50% of its capacity, leaving the satellite with 75% of its design power capacity. The Ku-band deflector deployment was scheduled for on 18 July 2012.

"The preliminary data review indicates that all systems performed nominally throughout the launch profile including fairing and spacecraft separation", said Kirk Pysher, chief operating officer of Energia Logistics Ltd., Sea Launch's technical partner and a subsidiary of Energia Overseas Ltd. of Moscow, the launch provider's majority owner. "Boeing engineers did note an unexpected, isolated event around 72 seconds after launch, which registered on microphones and pressure sensors", Pysher said. "We have only seen this one other time out of the 31 flights and while it is premature to speculate on its origin until further analysis is complete, it bears a striking resemblance to a prior Space Systems/Loral mission".

Peter Stier, a Sea Launch spokesperson, confirmed the prior Space Systems/Loral mission was the Telstar 14/Estrela do Sul 1 launch. During the 2004 mission, sensors registered a similar signature at about the same point in the flight.

On 19 December 2012, Space Systems/Loral (SSL) and Sea Launch confirmed that the Independent Oversight Board (IOB) formed to investigate the solar array deployment anomaly following launch of Intelsat-19 (IS-19) in the spring of 2012 successfully reached a unanimous conclusion. The IOB concluded: "the anomaly occurred before the spacecraft separated from the launch vehicle during the ascent phase of the launch and originated in one of the satellite's two solar array wings due to a rare combination of factors in the panel fabrication ... After rigorous investigation, the launch vehicle was exonerated from causing or contributing to the anomaly and there were no unexpected interactions between the spacecraft and the launch vehicle".

== See also ==
- Intelsat 20
