= Intelsat 8 =

Communications satellite owned by Intelsat

- Names: IS-8; PAS-8
- Mission type: Communications
- Operator: PanAmSat / Intelsat
- COSPAR ID: 1998-065A
- SATCAT no.: 25522
- Website: http://www.intelsat.com
- Mission duration: 15 years (planned); 18 years (achieved)

Spacecraft properties
- Spacecraft: PAS-8
- Spacecraft type: SSL 1300
- Bus: LS-1300
- Manufacturer: Space Systems/Loral
- Launch mass: 3,592 kg (7,919 lb)
- Dry mass: 2,100 kg (4,600 lb)

Start of mission
- Launch date: 4 November 1998, 05:12:00 UTC
- Rocket: Proton-K / DM-03
- Launch site: Baikonur, Site 200/39
- Contractor: Khrunichev State Research and Production Space Center
- Entered service: January 1999

End of mission
- Disposal: Graveyard orbit
- Deactivated: 26 December 2016

Orbital parameters
- Reference system: Geocentric orbit
- Regime: Geostationary orbit
- Longitude: 166° East (1998–2012); 169° East (2012–2016)

Transponders
- Band: 48 transponders: 24 C band at 50 watts 24 K_{u} band at 100 watts
- Coverage area: Asia-Pacific, Australia, Hawaii

Intelsat 8 (formerly PAS-8) is a communications satellite owned by Intelsat located at 166° East of longitude, serving the Pacific Ocean market.

== Mission ==
INTELSAT 8 (PAS-8) was launched on 4 November 1998 by a Proton Block DM vehicle from Baikonur Cosmodrome. The satellite was designed with 24 Ku-band channels at 100 Watts and 24 C-band channels at 50 Watts. The spacecraft is based on the Space Systems Loral SSL=1300 bus and was part of a series of three satellites ordered from Loral. The satellite was designed for the Pacific market serving Australia, Hawaii, the northwest coast of the U.S., and portions of the Far East.

On 13 August 2012, it was replaced with Intelsat 19. During September 2012, it was co-located to the same position as Intelsat 5 at 169° East from 166° East to continue its service life as Intelsat 5's replacement later in the year.

On 19 October 2012 at around 23:00 UTC, Intelsat 8 took over broadcasting Intelsat 5's television channels which include Australia Network and regular feeds of Entertainment Tonight and The Wall Street Journal Report available via a two-meter dish at 4.1 GHz horizontal.

== Decommissioning ==
The satellite was moved to a graveyard orbit by 26 December 2016.
