= Galaxy 19 =

Intelsat communications satellite

- Operator: Intelsat
- COSPAR ID: 2008-045A
- SATCAT no.: 33376
- Mission duration: 15 years

Spacecraft properties
- Bus: LS-1300
- Manufacturer: Space Systems/Loral

Start of mission
- Launch date: September 24, 2008, 09:27:59 UTC
- Rocket: Zenit-3SL
- Launch site: Odyssey
- Contractor: Sea Launch

Orbital parameters
- Reference system: Geocentric
- Regime: Geostationary
- Longitude: 97° west
- Perigee altitude: 35,782 kilometers (22,234 mi)
- Apogee altitude: 35,804 kilometers (22,248 mi)
- Inclination: 0.01 degrees
- Period: 1436.12 minutes
- Epoch: January 24, 2015, 09:14:02 UTC

Transponders
- Band: 24 C band
- Frequency: Horizontal: 3700.5 MHz; Vertical: 4199.5 MHz
- Bandwidth: 36 megahertz
- Coverage area: United States; Canada; Mexico; Caribbean; Greenland
- TWTA power: 20 watt SSPA

Galaxy 19 is a communications satellite owned by Intelsat located at 97° West longitude, serving the North American market. Galaxy 19 replaced Galaxy 25 which is nearing the end of its design life and has been moved to 93.1°W longitude. It was built by Space Systems/Loral, as part of its FS-1300 line. Galaxy 19 was formerly known as Intelsat Americas 9 and was successfully launched September 24, 2008. It provides services in the C band and K_{u} band.

The clients for Galaxy 19 include the previous clients for Galaxy 25. Expanded services include higher-powered C-band and K_{u} band transponders as well as new, high-power K_{a} band service. As of August 2017, Galaxy 19 broadcast 172 free-to-air channels for North American televisions, from a diverse list of national and international sources.

Galaxy 19 was launched using Sea Launch.
