= Superbird-A =

- Names: Superbird-1
- Mission type: Communications
- Operator: Space Communications Corporation
- COSPAR ID: 1989-041A
- SATCAT no.: 20040
- Mission duration: 10 years (planned)

Spacecraft properties
- Spacecraft: Superbird-A
- Spacecraft type: Superbird
- Bus: SSL 1300
- Manufacturer: Ford Aerospace
- Launch mass: 2,489 kg (5,487 lb)
- Dimensions: Stowed: 2.41 m × 2.58 m × 2.20 m (7 ft 11 in × 8 ft 6 in × 7 ft 3 in); Solar panels extended: 20.3 m (67 ft)
- Power: 4 kW

Start of mission
- Launch date: 5 June 1989, 22:37:18 UTC
- Rocket: Ariane-44L H10
- Launch site: Centre Spatial Guyanais, ELA-2
- Contractor: Arianespace

Orbital parameters
- Reference system: Geocentric orbit
- Regime: Geostationary orbit
- Longitude: 158° East

Transponders
- Band: 23 Ku-band; 3 Ka-band; 2 X-band
- Coverage area: Japan

Superbird-A, also identified as Superbird-1 before launch, was a geostationary communications satellite designed and manufactured by Ford Aerospace on the SSL 1300 satellite bus. It was originally ordered by Space Communications Corporation (SCC), which later merged into the SKY Perfect JSAT Group. It had a mixed Ku-band, Ka-band and X-band payload and operated on the 158° East longitude.

It was ordered in 1985 along Superbird-B, Superbird-A1 and Superbird-B1 on the first order of the SSL 1300 platform. It was also the first satellite of SCC and the second commercial satellite of Japan after JCSAT-1. It was used for video distribution, news gathering, remote publishing and high definition TV service to the main islands of Japan and Okinawa.

== Satellite description ==
The spacecraft was the first satellite designed and manufactured by Ford Aerospace on the SSL 1300 satellite bus. It was based on the design of the Intelsat V series and offered a three-axis stabilized platform.

It had a launch mass of 2,489 kg (5,487 lb) and a 10-year design life. When stowed for launch, its dimensions were 2.41 m × 2.58 m × 2.20 m (7 ft 11 in × 8 ft 6 in × 7 ft 3 in). With its solar panels fully extended it spanned 20.3 m (67 ft). Its power system generated approximately 3,984 watts of power due to two wings with three solar panels each. It also a NiH_{2} battery to survive the solar eclipses. It would serve as the main satellite on the 158° East longitude position of the Superbird.

Its propulsion system included an R-4D-11 liquid apogee engine (LAE) with a thrust of 490 N (110 lb_{f}). It included enough propellant for orbit circularization and 10 years of operation.

Its payload is composed of 23 Ku-band, 3 Ka-band, plus 2 X-band transponders.

== History ==
Space Communications Corporation (SCC) was founded in 1985, the same year as the original companies that later formed JSAT. In 1986, SCC ordered four spacecraft from Ford Aerospace, Superbird-1, Superbird-2, Superbird-A1 and Superbird-B1.

On 5 June 1989 at 22:37:18 UTC, Superbird-1, the second private communications satellite of Japan, was launched aboard an Ariane 44L along DFS Kopernikus-1. It was injected into a 185 km x 35,981 km geosynchronous transfer orbit (GTO), from which it climbed through three liquid apogee engine (LAE) firings. Once in its 158° East longitude position, it was rechristened as Superbird-A.
