= PAS-6 =

Communications satellite

- Names: PANAMSAT 6 Panamsat 6
- Mission type: Communications
- Operator: PanAmSat (1997-2004)
- COSPAR ID: 1997-040A
- SATCAT no.: 24891
- Mission duration: 15 years (planned); 7 years (achieved)

Spacecraft properties
- Spacecraft type: SSL 1300
- Bus: LS-1300
- Manufacturer: Space Systems/Loral
- Launch mass: 3,420 kg (7,540 lb)

Start of mission
- Launch date: 8 August 1997, 06:46:00 UTC
- Rocket: Ariane 44P H10-3 (V98)
- Launch site: Centre Spatial Guyanais, ELA-2
- Contractor: Arianespace
- Entered service: October 1997

End of mission
- Disposal: Graveyard orbit
- Deactivated: April 2004

Orbital parameters
- Reference system: Geocentric orbit
- Regime: Geostationary orbit
- Longitude: 45° West

Transponders
- Band: 36 Ku-band
- Coverage area: South America, Brazil

PAS-6 was a communications satellite owned by PanAmSat and serving the South America market.

== Satellite description ==
PAS-6 was constructed by Space Systems/Loral, based on the LS-1300 satellite bus. It had a mass at launch of 3,420 kg (7,540 lb). Designed for an operational life of 15 years, the spacecraft was equipped with 36 Ku-band transponders.

== Launch ==
Arianespace launched PAS-6, using an Ariane 4 launch vehicle, flight number V98, in the Ariane 44P H10-3 configuration. The launch took place from ELA-2 at the Centre Spatial Guyanais, at Kourou in French Guiana, on 8 August 1997, at 06:46:00 UTC.

== Decommissioning ==
On 17 March 2004, PAS-6 suffered an anomaly resulting in a loss of power. Then PanAmSat moved the satellite to a storage orbit while the PanAmSat and SS/L evaluated the problem. On 1 April 2004, this satellite experienced another anomaly and more significant loss of power. PAS-6 was put in graveyard orbit.
