= Superbird-B =

Geostationary communications satellite

Superbird-2
- Names: Superbird-B
- Mission type: Communications
- Operator: Space Communications Corporation
- COSPAR ID: 1990-F01
- Mission duration: 10 years (planned); Failed to orbit

Spacecraft properties
- Spacecraft: Superbird-2
- Spacecraft type: Superbird
- Bus: SSL 1300
- Manufacturer: Ford Aerospace
- Launch mass: 2,492 kg (5,494 lb)
- Dimensions: Stowed: 2.41 m × 2.58 m × 2.20 m (7 ft 11 in × 8 ft 6 in × 7 ft 3 in); Solar panels extended: 20.3 m (67 ft)
- Power: 4 kW

Start of mission
- Launch date: 22 February 1990, 23:17:00 UTC
- Rocket: Ariane-44L
- Launch site: Centre Spatial Guyanais, ELA-2
- Contractor: Arianespace
- Entered service: Failed to orbit

Orbital parameters
- Reference system: Geocentric orbit (planned)
- Regime: Geostationary orbit
- Longitude: 162° East

Transponders
- Band: 23 Ku-band; 3 Ka-band; 2 X-band
- Coverage area: Japan

Superbird-2, also identified as Superbird-B after launch if successful, was a geostationary communications satellite designed and manufactured by Ford Aerospace on the SSL 1300 satellite bus. It was originally ordered by Space Communications Corporation (SCC), which later merged into the SKY Perfect JSAT Group. It had a mixed Ku-band, Ka-band and X-band payload and was lost at launch.

It was ordered in 1985 along Superbird-A, Superbird-A1 and Superbird-B1 on the very first order of the SSL 1300 platform. It was to be the second satellite of SCC. It was supposed to be used for video distribution, news gathering, remote publishing and high definition TV service to the main islands of Japan and Okinawa from the 162° East position.

== Satellite description ==
The spacecraft was the second satellite designed and manufactured by Ford Aerospace on the SSL 1300 satellite bus. It was based on the design of the Intelsat V series and offered a three-axis stabilized platform.

It had a launch mass of 2,492 kg (5,494 lb) and a 10-year design life. When stowed for launch, its dimensions were 2.41 m × 2.58 m × 2.20 m (7 ft 11 in × 8 ft 6 in × 7 ft 3 in). With its solar panels fully extended it spanned 20.3 m (67 ft). Its power system generated approximately 4 kW of power due to two wings with three solar panels each. It also had dual NiH_{2} battery to survive the solar eclipses. It was supposed to serve as the main satellite on the 162° East position of the Superbird fleet.

Its propulsion system included an R-4D-11 liquid apogee engine (LAE) with a thrust of 490 N (110 lb_{f}). It included enough propellant for orbit circularization and 10 years of operation.

== History ==
Space Communications Corporation (SCC) was founded in 1985, the same year as the original companies that later formed JSAT. In 1986, SCC ordered four spacecraft from Space Systems/Loral: Superbird-1, Superbird-2, Superbird-A1 and Superbird-B1.

On 22 February 1990, at 23:17:00 UTC, Superbird-2 was launched aboard an Ariane 44L along with BS-2X. At 100 seconds into the flight, the flight failed due to a red handkerchief that blocked a water line in one of the Viking engines of the first stage. Both satellites were lost, and Superbird-B1 was rushed into launch.
