= Intelsat 20 =

Geostationary communications satellite

- Names: IS-20
- Mission type: Communications
- Operator: Intelsat
- COSPAR ID: 2012-043A
- SATCAT no.: 38740
- Mission duration: 18 years (planned)

Spacecraft properties
- Spacecraft: Intelsat 20
- Spacecraft type: SSL 1300
- Bus: LS-1300
- Manufacturer: Space Systems/Loral
- Launch mass: 6,090 kg (13,430 lb)
- Power: 19.3 kW

Start of mission
- Launch date: 2 August 2012, 20:54 UTC
- Rocket: Ariane 5 ECA (VA208)
- Launch site: Centre Spatial Guyanais, ELA-3
- Contractor: Arianespace
- Entered service: September 2012

Orbital parameters
- Reference system: Geocentric orbit
- Regime: Geostationary orbit
- Longitude: 68.5° East

Transponders
- Band: 79 transponders: 24 C band 54 Ku-band; 1 Ka-band
- Coverage area: Asia-Pacific, Asia, Africa, Middle East

Intelsat 20 is a geostationary communications satellite which is operated by Intelsat. It was constructed by Space Systems/Loral, and is based on the LS-1300 satellite bus. It was launched on 2 August 2012, and replaces the Intelsat 7 and Intelsat 10 spacecraft at 68.5° East longitude. It is fully operational since September 2012.

Intelsat 20 is the 47th satellite that Space Systems/Loral will provide to Intelsat, the leading provider of Fixed-Satellite Services (FSS) worldwide.

Intelsat 20 carries 24 C-band, 54 Ku-band and 1 Ka-band transponders. The C-band covers the Asia-Pacific region, while the Ku-band transponders is used for Direct to Home broadcasting to Asia, Africa, and the Middle East. The Ka-band payload provides coverage to the Middle East and Central Asia.

== See also ==
- Intelsat
- List of Intelsat satellites
- Intelsat 19
