= Eutelsat 117 West A =

Communications satellite

- Names: Satmex 8 (2013–2014); Eutelsat 117 West A (2014–present)
- Mission type: Communication
- Operator: Satmex (2013–2014); Eutelsat (2014–present)
- COSPAR ID: 2013-012A
- SATCAT no.: 39122
- Mission duration: 15 years

Spacecraft properties
- Bus: LS-1300
- Manufacturer: Space Systems/Loral
- Launch mass: 5,500 kilograms (12,100 lb)

Start of mission
- Launch date: 26 March 2013, 19:06:48 UTC
- Rocket: Proton-M/Briz-M
- Launch site: Baikonur 200/39
- Contractor: ILS

Orbital parameters
- Reference system: Geocentric
- Regime: Geostationary
- Longitude: 116.78° West
- Perigee altitude: 35,785 kilometres (22,236 mi)
- Apogee altitude: 35,800 kilometres (22,200 mi)
- Inclination: 0.02 degrees
- Period: 23.93 hours
- Epoch: 27 May 2014, 10:01:52 UTC

Transponders
- Band: 24 C-band; 40 Ku-band

Eutelsat 117 West A, formerly Satmex 8, is a geostationary communications satellite operated by Eutelsat. Previously operated by Satmex, it was launched by a Proton-M/Briz-M rocket in March 2013 to replace Satmex 5, and is being used to provide communication services to North, Central and South America, with broadband, voice and data transmission, and video broadcasting services. The satellite was transferred from Satmex to Eutelsat when the companies merged in 2014, being renamed as part of the Eutelsat fleet in May 2014.

== Specifications ==
The satellite is model SSL 1300E and carries twenty four C band transponders operating with 36 MHz and forty transponders in the K_{u} band operating with 36 MHz.
