= EchoStar VI =

American communications satellite

EchoStar VI / BermudaSat 1
- Mission type: Communication
- Operator: EchoStar / SES
- COSPAR ID: 2000-038A
- SATCAT no.: 26402
- Mission duration: 12 years

Spacecraft properties
- Bus: LS-1300
- Manufacturer: Loral
- Launch mass: 3,700 kilograms (8,200 lb)

Start of mission
- Launch date: 14 July 2000, 05:21:01 UTC
- Rocket: Atlas IIAS
- Launch site: Cape Canaveral SLC-36B
- Contractor: ILS

Orbital parameters
- Reference system: Geocentric
- Regime: Geostationary
- Longitude: 73° West -> 96° West

EchoStar VI or EchoStar 6 is a former American communications satellite which was operated by EchoStar. In 2013, the satellite was rebranded BermudaSat 1 after the satellite was sold to a Bermudan subsidiary of SES, a satellite operator based in Luxembourg.

It was constructed by Space Systems Loral and is based on the LS-1300 satellite bus. Its launch was contracted by International Launch Services, using an Atlas IIAS carrier rocket. The launch occurred at 05:21 GMT on 14 July 2000 from Space Launch Complex 36B at the Cape Canaveral Air Force Station.

It was originally built as Sky 1B or MCI-2 for MCI Communications. This was later cancelled and the satellite was rebuilt as Echostar VI. Following its launch and on-orbit testing, it was placed in geostationary orbit at 73° West, from where it provides broadcast and communications services to Europe using wide-band feeds. It carries thirty two transponders, and has an expected on-orbit lifespan of 12 years.

In March and August 2010, the satellite experienced solar-array anomalies resulting in the loss of 24 (of an initial 108) solar cell strings. Although the anomalies did not reduce the estimated useful life, the power reduction limits it to operating 24 DBS transponders (of the initial 32) at approximately 125 watts per channel, or 12 DBS transponders (of an original 16) at approximately 250 watts per channel.

In April 2013, the satellite was moved to 96.2° West, leased to SES on behalf of the Bermudan government and renamed BermudaSat 1. As BermudaSat 1, the satellite, which was slated for retirement in 2014, was designed chiefly to serve video and maritime communications in Latin America and the Caribbean, as well as to enable to secure the 96.2° West position for Bermuda.
