= Superbird-A1 =

- Names: Superbird-1A
- Mission type: Communications
- Operator: Space Systems/Loral
- COSPAR ID: 1992-084A
- SATCAT no.: 22253
- Mission duration: 10 years (planned)

Spacecraft properties
- Spacecraft: Superbird-A1
- Spacecraft type: Superbird
- Bus: SSL 1300
- Manufacturer: Ford Aerospace
- Launch mass: 2,780 kg (6,130 lb)
- Dimensions: Stowed: 2.41 m × 2.58 m × 2.20 m (7 ft 11 in × 8 ft 6 in × 7 ft 3 in); Solar panels extended: 20.3 m (67 ft)
- Power: 4 kW

Start of mission
- Launch date: 1 December 1992, 22:48:00 UTC
- Rocket: Ariane-42P H10+
- Launch site: Cebtre Spatial Guyanais, ELA-2
- Contractor: Arianespace

Orbital parameters
- Reference system: Geocentric orbit
- Regime: Geostationary orbit
- Longitude: 158° East

Transponders
- Band: 14 Ku-band; 30 Ka-band
- Coverage area: Japan

Superbird-A1, also identified as Superbird-1A before launch, was a geostationary communications satellite designed and manufactured by Ford Aerospace (now Space Systems/Loral) on the SSL 1300 satellite bus. It was originally ordered by Space Communications Corporation (SCC), which later merged into the SKY Perfect JSAT Group. It had a mixed Ku-band and Ka-band payload and operated on the 158° East longitude.

It was ordered in 1985 along Superbird-B, Superbird-A1 and Superbird-B1 on the very first order of the SSL 1300 platform.

== Satellite description ==
The spacecraft was the fourth satellite designed and manufactured by Ford Aerospace on the SSL 1300 satellite bus. It was based on the design of the Intelsat V series and offered a three-axis stabilized platform.

It had a launch mass of 2,780 kg (6,130 lb) and a 10-year design life. When stowed for launch, its dimensions were 2.41 m × 2.58 m × 2.20 m (7 ft 11 in × 8 ft 6 in × 7 ft 3 in). With its solar panels fully extended it spanned 20.3 m (67 ft). Its power system generated approximately 4 kW of power due to two wings with three solar panels each. It also a NiH_{2} battery to survive the solar eclipses. It would serve as the main satellite on the 158°E longitude position of the Superbird.

Its propulsion system included an R-4D-11 liquid apogee engine (LAE) with a thrust of 490 N (110 lb_{f}). It included enough propellant for orbit circularization and 10 years of operation.

Its payload is composed of 14 Ku-band plus 30 Ka-band transponders.

== History ==
Space Communications Corporation (SCC) was founded in 1985, the same year as the original companies that later formed JSAT. On 1986 SCC ordered four spacecraft, Superbird-1, Superbird-2, Superbird-A1 and Superbird-B1 from Ford Aerospace, which became Space Systems/Loral in October 1990.

On 1 December 1992 at 22:48:00 UTC Superbird-A1, was launched aboard an Ariane 42P. It was injected into a 192 km × 35,990 km × 7° geosynchronous transfer orbit (GTO), from which it climbed through three liquid apogee engine (LEA) firings. It was positioned in its 158° East longitude position where it was integrated to the Superbird communication network.
