= Telstar 14R =

Canadian commercial communications satellite

- Mission type: Communications
- Operator: Telesat
- COSPAR ID: 2011-021A
- SATCAT no.: 37602
- Mission duration: 15 years

Spacecraft properties
- Bus: LS-1300
- Manufacturer: Space Systems/Loral
- Launch mass: 4,970 kilograms (10,960 lb)

Start of mission
- Launch date: 20 May 2011, 19:15:19 UTC
- Rocket: Proton-M/Briz-M
- Launch site: Baikonur 200/39
- Contractor: International Launch Services

Orbital parameters
- Reference system: Geocentric
- Regime: Geostationary
- Longitude: 63° west
- Perigee altitude: 35,785 kilometres (22,236 mi)
- Apogee altitude: 35,799 kilometres (22,244 mi)
- Inclination: 0.01 degrees
- Period: 23.93 hours
- Epoch: 28 October 2013, 09:04:05 UTC

Telstar 14R, also known as Estrela do Sul 2 (Southern Star 2) is a commercial communications satellite in the Telstar series built by Space Systems/Loral for Telesat to provide Ku-band communications to South America and the Southern United States. It is a replacement for Telstar 14, whose north solar array failed to open after launch, limiting its mission effectiveness. Telstar 14R experienced the same problem, with its north solar array failing to open too, but is now in service despite that failure.

== Launch ==
It was launched 20 May 2011 from the Baikonur Cosmodrome in Kazakhstan aboard an International Launch Services Proton-M rocket. Telstar 14R is built around the Loral 1300 satellite bus, and has a launch mass of around 5000 kg. It is positioned in geosynchronous orbit at 63 degrees west.

== See also ==
- 2011 in spaceflight
