= EchoStar XVI =

Communications satellite

- Mission type: Communication
- Operator: EchoStar
- COSPAR ID: 2012-065A
- SATCAT no.: 39008
- Mission duration: 15 years (planned)

Spacecraft properties
- Bus: LS-1300
- Manufacturer: Space Systems/Loral
- Launch mass: 6,683 kilograms (14,733 lb)

Start of mission
- Launch date: 20 November 2012, 18:31 UTC
- Rocket: Proton-M/Briz-M
- Launch site: Baikonur 200/39
- Contractor: ILS

Orbital parameters
- Reference system: Geocentric
- Regime: Geostationary
- Longitude: 61.5° West
- Period: 24 hours

Transponders
- Band: 36 J band (IEEE K_{u} band)

EchoStar XVI is an American geostationary communications satellite which is operated by EchoStar. It is positioned in geostationary orbit, and will be located at a longitude of 61.5° West, from where it is intended to provide direct broadcasting of high-definition television services to the United States for Dish Network.

EchoStar XVI was built by Space Systems/Loral, and is based on the LS-1300 satellite bus. It is equipped with 32 J band (IEEE K_{u} band) transponders. At launch it had a mass of 6,258 kilograms (13,797 lb). It has a design life of fifteen years. It has a common configuration with EchoStar XI and EchoStar XV.

The launch of EchoStar XVI was conducted by International Launch Services, using a Proton-M carrier rocket with a Briz-M upper stage. The launch occurred on 20 November 2012, 18:31 UTC from Site 200/39 at the Baikonur Cosmodrome in Kazakhstan.

The arts organization Creative Time launched an archival disc created by artist Trevor Paglen called The Last Pictures into orbit on EchoStar XVI. Made of ultra-archival materials, the disc is expected to orbit the planet Earth for millions of years and possibly up to several billion years affixed to the exterior of the communications satellite if left untouched. The silicon wafer disc, protected by a gold-plated aluminum cover bolted to the satellite's exterior, contains one hundred black-and-white photographs selected to represent the artist's take on modern human history.

== See also ==
- EchoStar
- 2012 in spaceflight
