= Intelsat 34 =

Communications satellite

- Mission type: Communications
- Operator: Intelsat
- COSPAR ID: 2015-039A
- SATCAT no.: 40874
- Mission duration: 15 years (planned)

Spacecraft properties
- Bus: SSL 1300
- Manufacturer: Space Systems/Loral
- Launch mass: 3,300 kilograms (7,300 lb)

Start of mission
- Launch date: 20 August 2015 20:34 UTC
- Rocket: Ariane 5 ECA
- Launch site: Kourou
- Contractor: Arianespace

Orbital parameters
- Reference system: Geocentric
- Regime: Geostationary
- Longitude: 55.5 west
- Perigee altitude: 35,792 kilometres (22,240 mi)
- Apogee altitude: 35,800 kilometres (22,200 mi)
- Inclination: 0.03 degrees
- Period: 1436.22 minutes
- Epoch: 20 August 2015 UTC

INTELSAT 34 or IS-34 is communications satellite built on Space Systems/Loral's 1300-series satellite platform. The satellite broadcasts television to homes in Brazil, distributes video programming for companies like HBO and Fox across Latin America, and beams Internet broadband services to travelers aboard airplanes and ships crossing the North Atlantic Ocean.

The satellite has 22 C-band channels to provide services to North and South America and Europe and 18 Ku-band channels for services to Mexico, Central America, Brazil, the Caribbean, Europe, a portion of the United States, and the northern part of the Atlantic Ocean. Intelsat 34, unlike its predecessor, does not include the UHF-band that Intelsat had been unable to sell to its intended customer, the U.S. Department of Defense.

== Launch ==
Intelsat 34 is the 50th Loral-built satellite launched for Intelsat. With a launch mass of 7,275 pounds - about 3.3 metric tons - Intelsat 34 is a replacement for the Intelsat 27 spacecraft lost aboard a Sea Launch mission in 2013. It took over service from the Galaxy 11 and Intelsat 805 spacecraft in orbit, the company's last two relay stations that had been launched before 2000.
