= Superbird-B1 =

- Names: Superbird-1B
- Mission type: Communication
- Operator: Space Communications Corporation
- COSPAR ID: 1992-010A
- SATCAT no.: 21893
- Mission duration: 10 years (planned)

Spacecraft properties
- Spacecraft: Superbird-B1
- Spacecraft type: Superbird
- Bus: SSL 1300
- Manufacturer: Space Systems/Loral
- Launch mass: 2,560 kg (5,640 lb)
- Dimensions: Stowed: 2.41 m × 2.58 m × 2.20 m (7 ft 11 in × 8 ft 6 in × 7 ft 3 in); Solar arrays extended: 20.3 m (67 ft)
- Power: 4 kW

Start of mission
- Launch date: 26 February 1992, 23:58:10 UTC
- Rocket: Ariane-44L
- Launch site: Centre Spatial Guyanais, ELA-2
- Contractor: Arianespace

Orbital parameters
- Reference system: Geocentric orbit
- Regime: Geostationary orbit
- Longitude: 162° East

Transponders
- Band: 23 Ku-band; 3 Ka-band; 2 X-band
- Coverage area: Japan

Superbird-B1, sometimes identified as Superbird-1B, was a geostationary communications satellite designed and manufactured by Ford Aerospace on the SSL 1300 satellite bus. It was originally ordered by Space Communications Corporation (SCC), which later merged into the SKY Perfect JSAT Group. It had a mixed Ku-band, Ka-band and X-band payload and was rushed into launch at the 162° East longitude due to the launch failure of Superbird-B.

It was ordered in 1985 along Superbird-A, Superbird-B and Superbird-A1 on the very first order of the SSL 1300 platform. It was also the second satellite of SCC on orbit and the fourth commercial satellite of Japan to enter operations. It was used for video distribution, news gathering, remote publishing and high definition TV service to the main islands of Japan and Okinawa.

== Satellite description ==
The spacecraft was the third satellite designed and manufactured by Ford Aerospace on the SSL 1300 satellite bus. It was based on the design of the Intelsat V series and offered a three-axis stabilized platform.

It had a launch mass of 2,560 kg (5,640 lb) and a 10-year design life. When stowed for launch, its dimensions were 2.41 m × 2.58 m × 2.20 m (7 ft 11 in × 8 ft 6 in × 7 ft 3 in). With its solar panels fully extended it spanned 20.3 m (67 ft). Its power system generated approximately 4 kW of power due to two wings with three solar panels each. It also had two NiH_{2} batteries to survive the solar eclipses. It would serve as the main satellite on the 162°E longitude position of the Superbird fleet.

Its propulsion system included an R-4D-11 liquid apogee engine (LAE) with a thrust of 490 N (110 lb_{f}). It included enough propellant for orbit circularization and 10 years of operation.

Its payload is composed of 23 Ku-band plus 3 Ka-band and 2 X-band transponders.

== History ==
Space Communications Corporation (SCC) was founded in 1985, the same year as the original companies that later formed JSAT. In 1986, SCC ordered four spacecraft, Superbird-1, Superbird-2, Superbird-A1 and Superbird-B1, from Ford Aerospace, which became Space Systems/Loral in October 1990.

On 22 February 1990 at 23:17:00 UTC, Superbird-2 launch failed and the satellite was lost. Thus, Superbird-B1 was rushed and delivered in just 19 months. On 26 February 1992 at 23:58:10 UTC Superbird-B1, the fourth private communications satellite of Japan to orbit, was launched aboard an Ariane 44L along Arabsat-1C. It was injected into a 222 km × 35,776 km × 7° geosynchronous transfer orbit (GTO), from which it climbed through three liquid apogee engine (LAE) firings.
