= Galaxy 25 =

Communications satellite

- Names: G-25; Intelsat Americas 5 IA-5; Telstar 5
- Mission type: Communications
- Operator: Loral Skynet (1997-2007); Intelsat (2007-)
- COSPAR ID: 1997-026A
- SATCAT no.: 24812
- Website: https://www.intelsat.com
- Mission duration: 12 years (planned)

Spacecraft properties
- Bus: LS-1300
- Manufacturer: Space Systems/Loral
- Launch mass: 3,515 kg (7,749 lb)
- Dry mass: 1,469 kg (3,239 lb)

Start of mission
- Launch date: 24 May 1997, 17:00:00 UTC
- Rocket: Proton-K / DM-04
- Launch site: Baikonur, Site 81/23
- Contractor: Khrunichev State Research and Production Space Center

Orbital parameters
- Reference system: Geocentric orbit
- Regime: Geostationary orbit
- Longitude: 97° West

Transponders
- Band: 52 transponders: 24 C-band; 28 Ku-band
- Bandwidth: 36 MHz, 54 MHz, 27 MHz
- Coverage area: Hawaii, Canada, United States, Mexico, Caribbean

Galaxy 25 (G-25) launched in 1997, contracted by International Launch Services (ILS), formerly known as Intelsat Americas 5 (IA-5) until 15 February 2007 when it was renamed as result of the merger between owner Intelsat and PanAmSat for Telstar 5, is a medium-powered communications satellite formerly in a geostationary orbit at 97° West, above a point in the Pacific Ocean several hundred miles west of the Galapagos Islands. It was manufactured by Space Systems/Loral using its LS-1300 satellite bus and is currently owned and operated by Intelsat. The satellite's main C-band transponder cluster covers the United States, Canada, and Mexico; its main Ku-band transponder cluster covers the United States, Mexico, and the Northern Caribbean Sea. An additional C-band and a Ku-band transponder pair targets Hawaii.

Galaxy 25 has a projected life of 12 years. It was replaced by Galaxy 19 (formerly IA-9) in late 2008. When it was last in service at 97.1° West, Galaxy 25 transmitted both Free-to-air (FTA) direct-to-home (DTH) broadcasting and encrypted subscription channels / services. The replacement satellite, Galaxy 19 was successfully launched on September 24, 2008. Galaxy 25 has been moved to a different orbital position at 93.1° West where it is currently broadcasting several services on its K_{u} band transponders.

== Technical details ==
Key Parameters		
Total Transponders	C-Band:	24x36 MHz
	K_{u}-Band:	4x54 MHz, 24x27 MHz
Polarization	C-Band:	Linear - Horizontal or Vertical
	K_{u}-Band:	Linear - Horizontal or Vertical
e.i.r.p. (C-Band)		CONUS: 38.8 dBW; Alaska: 33.7 dBW; Caribbean: 34.3 dBW; Hawaii: 33.8 dBW; Mexico: 33.8 dBW; Puerto Rico / United States Virgin Islands: 34.0 dBW; Southern Canada: 37.0 dBW
e.i.r.p. (K_{u}-Band)		CONUS: 48.3 dBW; Alaska: 40.9 dBW; Caribbean: 43.4 dBW; Hawaii: 46.4 dBW; Mexico: 43.6 dBW; Puerto Rico / United States Virgin Islands: 44.9 dBW; Southern Canada: 44.3 dBW
Uplink Frequency	C-Band:	5925 to 6425 MHz
	K_{u}-Band:	14.00 to 14.50 GHz
Downlink Frequency	C-Band	3700 to 4200 MHz
	K_{u}-Band:	11.7 to 12.2 GHz
G/T (C-Band)		CONUS: -0.7 dB/K; Alaska: -8.2 dB/K; Caribbean: -4.7 dB/K; Hawaii: -5.2 dB/K; Mexico: -5.4 dB/K; Puerto Rico / United States Virgin Islands: -4.6 dB/K; Southern Canada: -2.3 dB/K
G/T (K_{u}-Band)		CONUS: +0.7 dB/K; Alaska: -3.3 dB/K; Caribbean: -3.2 dB/K; Hawaii: +0.6 dB/K; Mexico: -4.2 dB/K; Puerto Rico / United States Virgin Islands: +0.7 dB/K; Southern Canada: -1.6 dB/K
SFD Range (Beam Edge)	C-Band:	-92.0 to -71.0 dBW/m2
	K_{u}-Band:	-96.0 to -75.0 dBW/m2

== Platform operators ==
The K_{u}-Band side of the satellite carried the platforms of Pittsburgh International Telecommunications, Inc (PIT), Globecast, RRSat, and ABS-CBN, with free-to-air and encrypted television and radio programming in a variety of languages.

== See also ==
- FTA Receiver
