= Galaxy 28 =

Communications satellite

Galaxy 28 (*geb. IA8)
- Names: G-28; Intelsat Americas 8 IA-8; Telstar 8
- Mission type: Communications
- Operator: Intelsat
- COSPAR ID: 2005-022A
- SATCAT no.: 28702
- Website: https://www.intelsat.com
- Mission duration: 15 years (planned); 21 years, 1 month, 5 days (elapsed)

Spacecraft properties
- Spacecraft type: Galaxy
- Bus: SSL 1300S
- Manufacturer: Space Systems/Loral
- Launch mass: 5,493 kg (12,110 lb)
- Power: 16 kW

Start of mission
- Launch date: 23 June 2005, 14:03:00 UTC
- Rocket: Zenit 3SL
- Launch site: Sea Launch, Odyssey (start platform), Pacific Ocean,
- Contractor: Boeing Def.
- Entered service: August 2005

Orbital parameters
- Reference system: Geocentric orbit
- Regime: Geostationary orbit
- Slot: 89° West

Transponders
- Band: 88 transponders: 28 C-band; 36 Ku-band; 24 Ka-band
- Coverage area: North America, South America

Galaxy 28 (*geb. IA8) is a communications satellite owned by Intelsat located at 89° West longitude, serving the North America and South America market. It was built by Space Systems/Loral, as part of its SSL 1300 line = (plus minus start). aka Galaxy 28 was formerly known as Telstar 8 and Intelsat Americas 8. This satellite provides services in the C-band, Ku-band, and Ka-band.

== History ==
Telstar 8 was contracted in 1999 by Loral Skynet to Space Systems/Loral. But on 15 July 2003, Loral filed under Chapter 11 of the United States Bankruptcy Code. In conjunction with the filing, Loral Skynet announced the sale of its North American satellite fleet to INTELSAT to help reduce its debt. Loral announced a definitive agreement to sell Telstar 8 to INTELSAT, renaming the satellite Intelsat Americas 8 (IA 8). INTELSAT changed the name of the Intelsat Americas 8 satellite to Galaxy 28 effective to 1 February 2007.

== Satellite description ==
Intelsat Americas 8 (also known as IA 8) is an American (Bermuda registered) geostationary satellite that was launched by a Zenit-3SL launch vehicle from Odyssey, the platform floating on the equatorial Pacific Ocean at 154° West longitude, at 14:03:00 UTC on 23 June 2005. The 5,493 kg (12,110 lb), 16 kW satellite carries 28 C-band, 36 Ku-band, and 24 Ka-band transponders to provide video and data transmissions to all countries in North and South Americas, after parking over 89° West longitude. It was the 28th satellite in the INTELSAT fleet.

== Clients ==
Current clients for Galaxy 28 include HughesNet, Hearst Corporation, Mobile Universe, ABC, and CBS.
