= JCSAT-15 =

Geostationary communications satellite

- Mission type: Communication
- Operator: SKY Perfect JSAT Group
- COSPAR ID: 2016-082A
- SATCAT no.: 41903
- Website: http://www.jsat.net/en/contour/satellite-fleet.html

Spacecraft properties
- Spacecraft: JCSAT-15
- Bus: SSL 1300
- Manufacturer: SSL
- Launch mass: 3,400 kg (7,500 lb)
- Power: 10 kW

Start of mission
- Launch date: 20:30, December 21, 2016 (UTC)
- Rocket: Ariane 5 ECA
- Launch site: Guiana Space Centre ELA-3
- Contractor: Arianespace

Orbital parameters
- Reference system: Geocentric
- Semi-major axis: ~42,126 kilometres (26,176 mi)
- Eccentricity: 0.0006348
- Perigee altitude: ~35,721 kilometres (22,196 mi)
- Apogee altitude: ~35,775 kilometres (22,230 mi)
- Inclination: 0.0625
- Period: ~1434 minutes

Transponders
- Band: K_{u} band

JCSAT-15 is a communications satellite designed and manufactured for SKY Perfect JSAT Group by SSL on the SSL 1300 platform. It has a launch weight of 3,400 kg (7,500 lb), a power production capacity of 10 kW and a 15-year design life. Its payload is composed of K_{u} band and K_{a} band transponders.

SKY Perfect JSAT Group will use JCSAT-15 as a replacement of N-SAT-110.

== History ==
In April 2014, SSL announced that it had been awarded a contract by SKY Perfect JSAT Group to manufacture two satellites: JCSAT-15 and JCSAT-16. The former would be a 10 kW satellite to be a replacement of N-SAT-110 plus expansion capability.

On Sep 8, 2014 Arianespace announced that it had signed a launch service contract with JSAT for the launch of JCSAT-15 aboard an Ariane 5 ECA rocket, and the launch occurred on December 21, 2016. It will move to a geostationary orbit at 110E.
