= Intelsat 7 =

Communications satellite

- Names: IS-7; PANAMSAT 7 Panamsat 7
- Mission type: Communications
- Operator: PanAmSat (1998-2006) / Intelsat (2006-2016)
- COSPAR ID: 1998-052A
- SATCAT no.: 25473
- Website: http://www.intelsat.com
- Mission duration: 15 years (planned); 18 years (achieved)

Spacecraft properties
- Spacecraft type: SSL 1300
- Bus: LS-1300
- Manufacturer: Space Systems/Loral
- Launch mass: 3,833 kg (8,450 lb)
- Dry mass: 2,118 kg (4,669 lb)

Start of mission
- Launch date: 16 September 1998, 06:31 UTC
- Rocket: Ariane 44LP H10-3 (V110)
- Launch site: Centre Spatial Guyanais, ELA-2
- Contractor: Arianespace
- Entered service: November 1998

End of mission
- Disposal: Graveyard orbit
- Deactivated: 2016

Orbital parameters
- Reference system: Geocentric orbit
- Regime: Geostationary orbit
- Longitude: 18° West

Transponders
- Band: 44 transponders: 14 C-band at 50 watts 30 Ku-band at 100 watts
- Coverage area: Europe, Africa, Middle East, Asia

Intelsat 7, formerly PAS-7, was a communications satellite operated by Intelsat which spent most of its operational life serving the Europe, Africa, Middle East, Asia market from a longitude of 18° West.

== Satellite description ==
PAS-7 was constructed by Space Systems/Loral, based on the LS-1300 satellite bus. It had a mass at launch of 3,833 kg (8,450 lb). Designed for an operational life of 15 years, the spacecraft was equipped with 14 C-band at 50 watts and 30 Ku-band at 100 watts transponders.

== Launch ==
Arianespace launched PAS-7, using an Ariane 4 launch vehicle, flight number V98, in the Ariane 44LP H10-3 configuration. The launch took place from ELA-2 at the Centre Spatial Guyanais, at Kourou in French Guiana, on 16 September 1998, at 06:31 UTC.

== Decommissioning ==
PAS-7 experienced a sudden reduction of approximately 25% of its power capacity because a technical difficulty with one of the satellite's solar panels. The incident took place on 6 September 2001 when the satellite came out of solar eclipse. Services for all customers have not been affected. The satellite was retired in 2016 and was moved into a graveyard orbit.
