= Intelsat 704 =

Commercial geostationary communication satellite

- Mission type: Communications
- Operator: Intelsat
- COSPAR ID: 1995-001A
- SATCAT no.: 23461
- Mission duration: 15 years design life

Spacecraft properties
- Bus: SSL-1300
- Manufacturer: Space Systems/Loral
- Launch mass: 3,695 kilograms (8,146 lb)
- Dry mass: 1,450 kilograms (3,200 lb)

Start of mission
- Launch date: 10 January 1995, 06:18 UTC
- Rocket: Atlas IIAS
- Launch site: Cape Canaveral LC-36B

End of mission
- Disposal: Decommissioned
- Deactivated: May 2009

Orbital parameters
- Reference system: Geocentric
- Regime: Geostationary now graveyard orbit
- Longitude: 66° E

Transponders
- Band: 26 C band 10 K_{u} band
- Coverage area: Middle East, Africa, Europe, Indian Ocean

Intelsat 704 (also known as IS-704 and Intelsat 7-F4) is a geostationary communication satellite that was built by Space Systems/Loral (SSL). It is located in the orbital position of 29.5 degrees east longitude and it is currently in an inclined orbit. The same is owned by Intelsat and after sold to SES World Skies on November 30, 1998. The satellite was based on the LS-1300 platform and its estimated useful life was 15 years.

The satellite was successfully launched into space on January 10, 1995, at 06:18, using an Atlas II vehicle from the Cape Canaveral Air Force Station, United States. It had a launch mass of 3,695 kg.

The Intelsat 704 is equipped with 26 transponders in C band and 10 in Ku band to provide broadcasting, business-to-home services, telecommunications, VSATnetworks.

== Specifications ==
- Apogee: 36,117.4 kilometres (22,442.3 mi)
- Perigee: 36,088.6 kilometres (22,424.4 mi)
- Semimajor axis: 42,473 kilometres (26,391 mi)
- Orbital inclination: 6.9°
- Orbital period: 24,54 hours
- Propulsion: R-4D-11
- Power: 5 transponders of 35 W and 5 transponders of 50 W
- Bandwidth: 6 transponders of 72 MHz and 4 transponders of 112 MHz
- EIRP: Spot 1: 45.4 dBW, Spot 2: 44.5 dBW, and Spot 3: 46 dBW
- Polarization: Linear
- Beacons: 11.701 GHz, 12.501 GHz (linear)
  11.198 GHz, 11.452 GHz (RHCP)
- Frequency: Downlink 10.95-11.20 GHz, 11.45-11.70 GHz,
  11.70-11.95 GHz, and 12.50-12.75 GHz
