= Galaxy 26 =

Communication satellite launched in 1999

- Names: G-26; Intelsat Americas 6 IA-6; Telstar 6
- Mission type: Communications
- Operator: Intelsat
- COSPAR ID: 1999-005A
- SATCAT no.: 25626
- Website: https://www.intelsat.com
- Mission duration: 12 years (planned); 15 years (achieved)

Spacecraft properties
- Spacecraft type: Galaxy
- Bus: SSL 1300S
- Manufacturer: Space Systems/Loral
- Launch mass: 3,763 kg (8,296 lb)
- Dry mass: 1,469 kg (3,239 lb)
- Power: 16 kW

Start of mission
- Launch date: 15 February 1999, 05:12:00 UTC
- Rocket: Proton-K / DM-03
- Launch site: Baikonur, Site 81/23
- Contractor: Khrunichev State Research and Production Space Center

End of mission
- Disposal: Graveyard orbit
- Deactivated: 7 June 2014

Orbital parameters
- Reference system: Geocentric orbit
- Regime: Geostationary orbit
- Slot: 93° West

Transponders
- Band: 52 transponders: 24 C-band; 28 Ku-band
- Bandwidth: 36 MHz
- Coverage area: Canada, United States, Mexico

Galaxy 26 is a communications satellite owned by Intelsat. It was built by Space Systems/Loral, as part of its SSL 1300 satellite bus. Galaxy 26 was formerly known as Intelsat Americas 6 and Telstar 6. It was launched aboard a Proton-K / DM-03 from Baikonur Cosmodrome, Site 81/23.

It spent most of its operational life at the 93° West longitude orbital position, serving the North American market. Clients included ABC, CBS, CNN and FOX.

== The ailing bird ==
Galaxy 26, known as Telstar 6 at the time, had its share of problems since its 15 February 1999 launch. It had lost a backup command and control receiver, the back up computer, and had completely shut off twice. The satellite first shut down on 22 April 2001 causing the Fox network to relocate feeds to Telstar 5 at 97° West. Then on 11 April 2002 it shut down again and went into a very slow spin.

On 29 June 2008, Galaxy 26 had a power failure in one of its solar panels. It lost 15 kilowatts out of a possible 37 kilowatt capacity, which is very important for charging the batteries. Also, there were multiple transponder failures. Several cable television networks immediately took action to move their feeds to backup satellites in order to keep themselves on air in the event of total failure. Fox News moved operations to Galaxy 16 transponders 7, 9, and 11, and to AMC-5 transponder 4K Slot F according to a Fox News internal email. Within a week, CBS had moved all main feeds to Galaxy 25, and all secondary feeds to Galaxy 28, according to an internal email.

In February 2009, following an urgent call from the Pentagon's Joint staff, Intelsat moved the satellite to the 50.8° East orbital position for use by the United States Department of Defense for unmanned aerial vehicle support. This repositioning of the Galaxy-26, which could be reached by U.S. drone operators by using the relay station at Ramstein Air Base, facilitated the rapid expansion of the U.S. drone program.

== End of mission ==
Galaxy 26 was officially decommissioned on 7 June 2014. The satellite was originally scheduled for decommissioning around 15 March 2014, but that date was extended following delays in the launch of two replacement satellites.
