= Telstar 14 =

Canadian commercial communications satellite

- Mission type: Communications
- Operator: Loral Skynet (2004-07); Telesat (2007-11)
- COSPAR ID: 2004-001A
- SATCAT no.: 28137
- Mission duration: 15 years planned

Spacecraft properties
- Bus: LS-1300
- Manufacturer: Space Systems/Loral
- Launch mass: 4,695 kilograms (10,351 lb)

Start of mission
- Launch date: 11 January 2004, 04:12:59 UTC
- Rocket: Zenit-3SL
- Launch site: Odyssey
- Contractor: Sea Launch

End of mission
- Disposal: Decommissioned
- Deactivated: c. 2011

Orbital parameters
- Reference system: Geocentric
- Regime: Geostationary
- Longitude: 63° west
- Perigee altitude: 36,193 kilometres (22,489 mi)
- Apogee altitude: 36,207 kilometres (22,498 mi)
- Inclination: 1.95 degrees
- Period: 24.28 hours
- Epoch: 28 October 2013, 15:53:21 UTC

Telstar 14 or Estrela do Sul 1 (Southern Star 1) is a commercial communications satellite in the Telstar series built by Space Systems/Loral (SS/L) for Telesat to provide Ku-band communications to South America and the Southern United States. Estrela do Sul 1 was launched by Sea Launch using a Zenit-3SL carrier rocket on 11 Jan 2004 for geosynchronous orbit at 63 degrees west.

The North solar array failed to open after launch, limiting the mission effectiveness. The president of SS/L later said images of the satellite in orbit showed massive damage to the affected array, indicating that an explosion had occurred during launch. The satellite entered service with reduced capacity (17 transponders) and reduced life span of 7 years with the jammed panel.

Estrela do Sul 1 / Telstar 14 and Estrela do Sul 2 / Telstar 14R are built around the Loral 1300 satellite bus, and have launch mass of around 5000 kg.

== Launch ==
The Telstar 14R replacement was launched in May 2011 from the Baikonur Cosmodrome in Kazakhstan aboard an International Launch Services Proton-M rocket. This replacement satellite, Telstar 14R experienced the same problem, with its north solar array failing to open. The Telstar 14R replacement satellite is in service, despite that deployment failure.

== See also ==
- 2004 in spaceflight
