= N-STAR b =

Japanese communications satellite

- Mission type: Communication
- Operator: SKY Perfect JSAT Group
- COSPAR ID: 1996-007A
- SATCAT no.: 23781
- Mission duration: 10 years (planned)

Spacecraft properties
- Spacecraft: N-STAR b
- Bus: SSL 1300
- Manufacturer: Space Systems/Loral
- Launch mass: 3,400 kg (7,500 lb)
- BOL mass: 2,050 kg (4,520 lb)
- Dry mass: 1,617 kg (3,565 lb)

Start of mission
- Launch date: 5 February 1996, 07:19:38 UTC
- Rocket: Ariane 44P H10-3
- Launch site: Centre Spatial Guyanais, ELA-2
- Contractor: Arianespace

Orbital parameters
- Reference system: Geocentric orbit
- Regime: Geostationary orbit

Transponders
- Band: 6 C-band; 11 Ka-band; 8 Ku-band; 1 S-band
- Coverage area: Japan

N-STAR b, was a geostationary communications satellite originally ordered by a consortium including NTT DoCoMo and JSAT Corporation, and later fully acquired by JSAT, which was merged into SKY Perfect JSAT Group. It was designed and manufactured by Space Systems/Loral on the SSL 1300 platform. It had a launch weight of 3,400 kg (7,500 lb), and a 10-year design life. Its payload is composed of 6 C-band, 11 Ka-band, 8 Ku-band and 1 S-band transponders.

== History ==
N-Star was created as a joint venture between JSAT, Nippon Telegraph and Telephone (NTT), NTT Communications and NTT DoCoMo for the supply of these latter two WIDESTAR satellite telephone and data packet service. JSAT would handle the satellite side of business and NTT DoCoMo would operate the payload.

Two identical satellites were ordered on 1992 from Space Systems Loral, N-STAR a and N-STAR b, for 1995 and 1996 on orbit delivery. They would be "switchboards in the sky" having S-band, C-band, Ka-band and Ku-band payload.

N-STAR a was successfully launched aboard an Ariane 44P on 29 August 1995. Its twin, N-STAR b, launched on 5 February 1996, also aboard an Ariane 44P. The satellite telephone service was operational in March 1996. In March 2000, the packet communications service was introduced. In March 2000, JSAT received the NTT Communications interest in the N-STAR a and N-STAR b.

In August 2003, the JSAT acquired the NTT DoCoMo interest on N-STAR a and N-STAR b, whom then leased them back.

== See also ==
- JCSAT-5A – Also known as N-STAR d, was the follow on satellite.
