= Eutelsat 113 West A =

French communications satellite

- Names: Satmex-6 (2006–2014); Eutelsat 113 West A (2014–present)
- Mission type: Communication
- Operator: Satmex (2006–2014); Eutelsat (2014–present)
- COSPAR ID: 2006-020A
- SATCAT no.: 29162
- Mission duration: Planned: 15 years Final: 17 years, 8 months, 6 days

Spacecraft properties
- Bus: LS-1300X
- Manufacturer: Space Systems/Loral
- Launch mass: 5,456 kilograms (12,028 lb)

Start of mission
- Launch date: 27 May 2006, 21:09 UTC
- Rocket: Ariane 5ECA
- Launch site: Kourou ELA-3
- Contractor: Arianespace

End of mission
- Disposal: Decommissioned
- Deactivated: 2 February 2024

Orbital parameters
- Reference system: Geocentric
- Regime: Geostationary
- Longitude: 113° West
- Perigee altitude: 35,783 kilometres (22,235 mi)
- Apogee altitude: 35,801 kilometres (22,246 mi)
- Inclination: 0.00 degrees
- Period: 23.93 hours
- Epoch: 27 May 2014, 09:05:59 UTC

Transponders
- Band: 36 G/H band 24 J band

Eutelsat 113 West A, formerly Satmex-6, is a geostationary communications satellite which is operated by Eutelsat. Originally built for Mexico's Satmex, it was launched in 2006. The satellite was acquired by Eutelsat in its 2014 merger with Satmex, and renamed Eutelsat 113 West A in May. It is used to provide communications services to the Americas, Hawaii and the Caribbean.

Constructed by Space Systems/Loral, Satmex 6 is based on the LS-1300X satellite bus. It is equipped with 36 G/H band (IEEE C band) and 24 J band (IEEE K_{u}-band) transponders, and at launch it had a mass of 5,456 kilograms (12,028 lb), with an expected operational lifespan of 15 years.

Arianespace was contracted to launch Satmex 6, using an Ariane 5ECA carrier rocket flying from ELA-3 at the Guiana Space Centre. The launch occurred at 21:09 GMT on 27 May 2006, and placed Satmex 6, along with the Thaicom 5 satellite, into a geosynchronous transfer orbit. At the time, this was the heaviest dual-satellite payload ever launched to geostationary transfer orbit.

Following launch, the satellite raised its own orbit by means of an onboard apogee motor. At 18:33 GMT on 31 May, it was injected into geostationary orbit. It was subsequently tested, and positioned at a longitude of 113° West for operational service.

Eutelsat 113 West A operated successfully for over 17 years. On 31 January 2024, the satellite suffered an anomaly that led Eutelsat to announce the termination of services from the spacecraft two days later.

== See also ==
- 2006 in spaceflight
