= Lanteris 1300 =

Satellite bus

The Lanteris 1300, previously the SSL 1300, LS-1300, and the FS-1300, is a satellite bus produced by Lanteris Space Systems, formerly Space Systems/Loral (SS/L). Total broadcast power ranges from 5 to 25 kW, and the platform can accommodate from 12 to 150 transponders. The Lanteris 1300 is a modular platform and Lanteris no longer reports designators for sub-versions, such as: 1300E, 1300HL, 1300S, 1300X.

First available in the late 1980s, the Lanteris 1300 platform underwent revision multiple times over its design life, all the while remaining a widely-used communications platform. The earliest models provided 5,000 RF watts of transmitter power, weighed 5,500 kg, and required a 4-meter diameter launch fairing. Newer models provide double that, approximately 10,000 RF watts of transmitter power, weigh 6,700 kg, and require a 5-meter diameter launch fairing.

Lanteris (then SS/L) stated that they would use electric propulsion for North-South station keeping for the first time on the MBSat in 2004. The subsystem was supplied by International Space Technologies Inc and used Fakel's Hall thrusters and American and European propellant supply and electronics. According to Moog-ISP, the Lanteris 1300 platform uses its bipropellant thrusters.

In September 2015, Lanteris (then SSL) announced that it had delivered 100 satellites based on the Lanteris 1300 platform. At the time, there were more Lanteris 1300s providing service on orbit than any other model communications satellite.

== Lanteris 1300 firsts ==
From 1990–2015, the Lanteris 1300 was the first platform to incorporate many innovations.

- first satellite to use a 100-volt bus and Direct Radiating Collector (DRC) amplifiers, providing the higher power needed for direct-to-home television.
- first true high-throughput satellite, an advance which now enables millions of people around the world to have access to relatively high speed broadband.
- first to reach 20-kW of power, which enables satellite broadcast of today's HD and UltraHD television.
- first satellite to provide two-way ground-based beam forming, which increases a satellite's flexibility to meet changing business requirements.

Other advances:

- the 1300 was one of the first platforms to use shaped antenna reflectors, which enable precisely defined coverage areas.
- the 1300 was one of the first platforms to incorporate lithium-ion batteries, which have 50 percent less mass than the nickel-hydrogen batteries they replaced and helped to enable higher power satellites.
- In 2015, the world's two highest-capacity broadband satellites then providing service were built on the 1300 platform.

== Satellite orders ==
=== 1300 Series ===
Satellite	Country	Operator	Type	Coverage	Launch date (UTC)	Rocket	Changes	Status
Agila 2	Philippines	Mabuhay Satellite Corporation	Television broadcasting & Satellite Internet Access	30 C-band, 24 Ku-band transponders	19 August 1997	Long March 3B	Known as ABS 3	Retired
Apstar 2R	China	APT Satellite Holdings	Television broadcasting	28 C-band, 25 Ku-band transponders	16 October 1997	Long March 3B	Known as Telstar 10	Retired
AsiaSat 5	China	AsiaSat	Television broadcasting and telephone networks	26 C-band, 14 Ku-band transponders	11 August 2009	Proton-M Phase 2		Active
AsiaSat 6	China	AsiaSat	Television broadcasting and telephone networks	28 C-band	7 September 2014	Falcon 9	Known as Thaicom 7	Active
AsiaSat 7	China	AsiaSat	Television broadcasting and telephone networks	26 C-band, 14 Ku-band transponders	25 November 2011	Proton-M Phase 2	Known as Thaicom 6A	Active
AsiaSat 8	China	AsiaSat	Television broadcasting and telephone networks	24 C-band, 1 Ka-band	5 August 2014	Falcon 9	Known as AMOS 7	Active
Azerspace 2/Intelsat 38	Azerbaijan, International	Azercosmos, Intelsat	Television broadcasting		25 September 2018	Ariane 5 ECA		Active
BRIsat	Indonesia	Bank Rakyat Indonesia	Banking	9 Ku-band, 36 C-band	18 June 2016	Ariane 5 ECA		Active
BSAT-4a	Japan	BSAT Corp	Television broadcasting	24 Ku-band	29 September 2017	Ariane 5 ECA		Active
BSAT-4b	Japan	BSAT Corp	Television broadcasting	24 Ku-band	15 August 2020	Ariane 5 ECA		Active
BulgariaSat-1	Bulgaria	Bulsatcom	Television broadcasting	3 Ku-band, 30 Ku-band	23 June 2017	Falcon 9		Active
Tempo 1	United States	TeleCommunications Satellite Inc.	Television broadcasting	32 Ku-band	7 May 2002	Proton-K Blok-DM3	Known as DirecTV 5	Active
Tempo 2	United States	TeleCommunications Satellite Inc.	Television broadcasting	32 Ku-band	8 March 1997	Atlas II-A	Known as DirecTV 6	Retired
DirecTV 8	United States	DirecTV	Television broadcasting	36 Ku-band	22 May 2005	Proton-M Phase 1		Active
EchoStar 5	United States	EchoStar	Television broadcasting	32 Ku-band	23 September 1999	Atlas II-AS	Known as Ciel 1	Retired
EchoStar 6	United States	EchoStar	Television broadcasting	32 Ku-band	14 August 2000	Atlas II-AS	Known as Bermudasat 1	Retired
EchoStar 8	United States	EchoStar	Television broadcasting	32 Ku-band	22 August 2002	Proton-K Blok-DM3		Retired
Europe*Star 1	France	Loral Skynet	Television broadcasting	30 Ku-band	29 October 2000	Ariane-44LP	Formerly known as PAS 12, now known as Intelsat 12	Retired
Galaxy 16	United States	PanAmSat	Television broadcasting	24 C-band, 24 Ku-band	18 June 2006	Zenit-3SL		Active
Galaxy 18	United States	PanAmSat	Television broadcasting	24 C-band, 24 Ku-band	21 May 2006	Zenit-3SL		Active
Galaxy 19	United States	Intelsat	Television broadcasting	24 C-band, 28 Ku-band	24 September 2008	Zenit-3SL		Active
GOES 8	United States	NOAA	Meteorology		13 April 1994	Atlas I	Known as GOES I	Retired
GOES 9	United States	NOAA	Meteorology		23 May 1995	Atlas I	Known as GOES J	Retired
GOES 10	United States	NOAA	Meteorology		25 April 1997	Atlas I	Known as GOES K	Retired
GOES 11	United States	NOAA	Meteorology		3 May 2000	Atlas II-A	Known as GOES L	Retired
GOES 12	United States	NOAA	Meteorology		23 July 2001	Atlas II-A	Known as GOES M	Retired
Intelsat 34	United States	Intelsat	Television broadcasting, aviation broadcasting	24 C-band, 24 Ku-band	20 August 2015	Ariane 5 ECA	Known as Hispasat 55W-2	Active
Intelsat 36	United States	Intelsat	Television broadcasting, aviation broadcasting	10 C-band, 30 Ku-band	24 August 2016	Ariane 5 ECA		Active
Intelsat 701	United States	Intelsat	Voice, video, and data transmission	26 C-band, 10 Ku-band	22 October 1993	Ariane-44LP		Retired
Intelsat 702	United States	Intelsat	Voice, video, and data transmission	26 C-band, 10 Ku-band	17 June 1994	Ariane-44LP		Retired
Intelsat 703	United States	Intelsat	Voice, video, and data transmission	26 C-band, 10 Ku-band	6 October 1994	Atlas II-AS	Known as NSS 703	Retired
Intelsat 704	United States	Intelsat	Voice, video, and data transmission	26 C-band, 10 Ku-band	10 January 1995	Atlas II-AS		Retired
Intelsat 705	United States	Intelsat	Voice, video, and data transmission	26 C-band, 10 Ku-band	22 May 1995	Atlas II-AS		Retired
Intelsat 706	United States	Intelsat	Voice, video, and data transmission	26 C-band, 14 Ku-band	17 May 1995	Ariane-44LP		Retired
Intelsat 707	United States	Intelsat	Voice, video, and data transmission	26 C-band, 14 Ku-band	14 March 1996	Ariane-44LP		Retired
Intelsat 708	United States	Intelsat	Voice, video, and data transmission	26 C-band, 14 Ku-band	14 February 1996	Long March 3B	Launch failure	Destroyed
Intelsat 709	United States	Intelsat	Voice, video, and data transmission	26 C-band, 10 Ku-band	15 June 1996	Ariane-44LP		Retired
Intelsat 901	United States	Intelsat	Voice, video, and data transmission	44 C-band, 12 Ku-band	9 June 2001	Ariane-44L		Active
Intelsat 902	United States	Intelsat	Voice, video, and data transmission	44 C-band, 12 Ku-band	30 August 2001	Ariane-44L		Active
Intelsat 903	United States	Intelsat	Voice, video, and data transmission	44 C-band, 12 Ku-band	30 March 2002	Proton-K Blok-DM3		Retired
Intelsat 904	United States	Intelsat	Voice, video, and data transmission	44 C-band, 12 Ku-band	23 February 2002	Ariane-44L		Active
Intelsat 905	United States	Intelsat	Voice, video, and data transmission	44 C-band, 12 Ku-band	5 June 2002	Ariane-44L		Active
Intelsat 906	United States	Intelsat	Voice, video, and data transmission	44 C-band, 12 Ku-band	6 September 2002	Ariane-44L		Active
Intelsat 907	United States	Intelsat	Voice, video, and data transmission	44 C-band, 12 Ku-band	15 February 2003	Ariane-44L		Retired
JCSat 14 (JCSat 2B)	Japan	SKY Perfect JSAT	Television broadcasting, maritime, aviation, and resource exploration	26 C-band, 18 Ku-band	6 May 2016	Falcon 9		Active
JCSat 15 (JCSat 110A)	Japan	SKY Perfect JSAT	Television broadcasting		21 December 2016	Ariane 5 ECA		Active
JCSAT-16	Japan	SKY Perfect JSAT	Television broadcasting		14 August 2016	Falcon 9		Active
MBSat 1	Japan	MBC	Television broadcasting	16 S-band, 1 Ku-band, TRW 12 meter reflector	13 March 2004	Atlas IIIA	Known as ABS 4 (Mobisat)	Active
MTSat 1	Japan	Japan Meteorological Agency	Meteorology		15 November 1999	H-IIS	Launch failure	Destroyed
MTSat 1R	Japan	Japan Meteorological Agency	Meteorology		26 February 2005	H-IIA-2022		Retired
N-STAR a	Japan	NTT Docomo	Mobile communications	6 C-band, 11 Ka-band, 8 Ku-band, 2 S-band	29 August 1995	Ariane-44P		Retired
N-STAR b	Japan	NTT Docomo	Mobile communications	6 C-band, 11 Ka-band, 8 Ku-band, 2 S-band	5 February 1996	Ariane-44P		Retired
Nimiq 5	Canada	Telesat	Television broadcasting	32 Ku-band	17 September 2009	Proton-M Phase 2		Active
Nimiq 6	Canada	Telesat	Television broadcasting	32 Ku-band	17 May 2012	Proton-M Phase 3		Active
Optus 10	Australia	Optus	Television broadcasting	34 Ku-band	11 September 2014	Ariane 5 ECA		Active
Orion 2	United States	Telesat	Television broadcasting	38 Ku-band	19 October 1999	Ariane-44LP	Known as Telstar 12	Retired
PAS 6	United States	PanAmSat	Television broadcasting	36 Ku-band	8 August 1997	Ariane-44P		Retired
PAS 7	United States	PanAmSat	Television broadcasting	14 C-band, 30 Ku-band	16 September 1998	Ariane-44LP	Known as Intelsat 7	Retired
PAS 8	United States	PanAmSat	Television broadcasting	24 C-band, 24 Ku-band	4 November 1998	Proton-K Blok-DM3	Known as Intelsat 8	Retired
ProtoStar 1	United States	Protostar	Voice, data, and digital voice communications	36 C-band, 16 Ku-band	7 July 2008	Proton-K Blok-DM3	Known as Intelsat 25	Active
Sirius FM-1	United States	Sirius Satellite Radio	Radio	1 X-band	30 June 2000	Proton-K Blok-DM3	Known as Radiosat 1	Retired
Sirius FM-2	United States	Sirius Satellite Radio	Radio	1 X-band	5 September 2000	Proton-K Blok-DM3	Known as Radiosat 2	Retired
Sirius FM-3	United States	Sirius Satellite Radio	Radio	1 X-band	30 November 2000	Proton-K Blok-DM3	Known as Radiosat 3	Retired
Spainsat 1/XTAR-LANT	Spain	Hispasat	Defense communications	12 X-band, 1 Ka-band	11 March 2006	Ariane 5 ECA		Active
Superbird-A	Japan	SCC	Television broadcasting	23 Ku-band, 3 Ka-band, 2 X-band	5 June 1989	Ariane-44L		Active
Superbird-A1	Japan	SCC	Television broadcasting	23 Ku-band, 3 Ka-band, 2 X-band	1 December 1992	Ariane-44P		Retired
Superbird-B	Japan	SCC	Television broadcasting	23 Ku-band, 3 Ka-band, 2 X-band	22 February 1990	Ariane-44L	Launch failure	Destroyed
Superbird-B1	Japan	SCC	Television broadcasting	23 Ku-band, 3 Ka-band, 2 X-band	26 February 1992	Ariane-44L		Retired
Telstar 5	United States	Intelsat Americas	Television broadcasting	24 C-band, 28 Ku-band	24 May 1997	Proton-K Blok-DM4	Known as Galaxy 25	Active
Telstar 6	United States	Intelsat Americas	Television broadcasting	24 C-band, 28 Ku-band	15 February 1999	Proton-K Blok-DM3	Known as Galaxy 26	Retired
Telstar 7	United States	Intelsat Americas	Television broadcasting	24 C-band, 24 Ku-band	25 September 1999	Ariane-44LP	Known as Galaxy 27	Retired
Telstar 11N	Canada	Telesat	Television broadcasting	39 Ku-band	26 February 2009	Zenit-3SLB		Active
Estrela do Sul 1	Brazil	Loral Skynet do Brazil	Television broadcasting	41 Ku-band	11 January 2004	Zenit-3SL	Known as Telstar 14	Retired
Estrela do Sul 2	Brazil	Loral Skynet do Brazil	Television broadcasting	46 Ku-band	20 May 2011	Proton-M Phase 3	Known as Telstar 14R	Active
Telstar 18	USA	Loral Skynet	Television broadcasting	38 C-band, 16 Ku-band	29 June 2004	Zenit-3SL	Known as APStar 5	Retired
Thor 7	Norway	Telenor	Television broadcasting	11 Ku-band, 11 Ka-band	26 April 2015	Ariane 5 ECA	Known as Intelsat 1W	Active
WildBlue 1	United States	Viasat, Inc.	Satellite internet	35 Ka-band	8 December 2006	Ariane 5 ECA		Active
XTAR-EUR	Spain	XTAR	Defense communications	12 X-band	12 May 2005	Ariane 5 ECA		Active

=== 1300 expanded series ===
Satellite	Country	Operator	Type	Coverage	Launch date (UTC)	Rocket	Changes	Status
ABS-2	China	Asia Broadcast Satellite	Television broadcasting	78 C-band, 78 Ka-band	6 February 2014	Ariane 5 ECA	Known as Koreasat 8	Active
Amazonas 3	Spain	Hispasat	Communications	19 C-band, 33 Ku-band, 9 Ka-band	7 February 2013	Ariane 5 ECA		Active
Amazonas 5	Spain	Hispasat	Communications	24 Ku-band, 34 Ka-band	11 September 2017	Proton-M Phase 3		Active
Anik G1	Canada	Telesat	Television broadcasting	24 C-band, 12 Ku-band, 34 Ka-band	15 April 2013	Proton-M Phase 3		Active
AsiaSat 9	China	AsiaSat	Communications	28 C-band, 32 Ku-band, 32 Ka-band	28 September 2017	Proton-M Phase 4		Active
DirecTV 7S	United States	DirecTV	Television broadcasting	54 transponders	4 May 2004	Zenit-3SL		Retired
DirecTV 9S	United States	DirecTV	Television broadcasting	54 transponders	13 October 2006	Ariane 5 ECA		Active
DirecTV 14	United States	DirecTV	Television broadcasting	76 Ka-band	6 December 2014	Ariane 5 ECA		Active
EchoStar 9	United States	EchoStar	Television broadcasting	24 C-band, 2 Ka-band, 32 Ku-band	8 August 2003	Zenit-3SL	Known as Galaxy 23	Active
EchoStar 11	United States	EchoStar	Television broadcasting	32 Ku-band	16 July 2008	Zenit-3SL		Active
EchoStar 15	United States	EchoStar	Television broadcasting	32 Ku-band	10 July 2010	Proton-M Phase 3		Active
EchoStar 16	United States	EchoStar	Television broadcasting	32 Ku-band	20 November 2012	Proton-M Phase 3		Active
EchoStar 17	United States	EchoStar	Satellite internet	32 Ku-band	5 July 2012	Ariane 5 ECA	Known as Jupiter 1	Active
EchoStar 18	United States	EchoStar	Television broadcasting	61 Ku-band	18 June 2016	Ariane 5 ECA		Active
EchoStar 19	United States	EchoStar	Satellite internet	Bent-pipe multi-spot beam Ka-band	18 December 2016	Atlas V 431	Known as Jupiter 2	Active
TerreStar-1	United States	EchoStar	Mobile communications	S-band	1 July 2009	Ariane 5 ECA	Known as EchoStar T1	Active
EchoStar 21	United States	EchoStar	Mobile communications	S-band	8 June 2017	Proton-M Phase 3		Active
EchoStar 23	United States	EchoStar	Television broadcasting	Ku-band	16 March 2017	Falcon 9		Active
EchoStar 24	United States	EchoStar	Satellite internet	UHDS multi-spot beam Ka-band	29 July 2023	Falcon Heavy	Known as Jupiter-3	Active
EchoStar 25	United States	EchoStar	Television broadcasting		10 March 2026	Falcon 9		Commissioning
EchoStar 26	United States	EchoStar	Television broadcasting		202x	Falcon 9		Awaiting launch
Eutelsat 25B/Es'hail 1	International, Qatar	Eutelsat	Television broadcasting	32 Ku-band, 14 Ka-band	29 August 2013	Ariane 5 ECA	Known as Eutelsat 25B/Es'hail 1	Active
Eutelsat 65 West A	International	Eutelsat	Television broadcasting	10 C-band, 24 Ku-band	9 March 2016	Ariane 5 ECA		Active
Hispasat 1E	Spain	Eutelsat	Communications	53 Ku-band, 1 Ka-band	29 December 2010	Ariane 5 ECA	Known as Hispasat 30W-5	Active
Hispasat 30W-6	Spain	Hispasat	Television broadcasting, satellite internet	40 Ku-band, 6 Ka-band	6 March 2018	Falcon 9	Formerly known as Hispasat 1F	Active
ICO G1	United States	EchoStar	Mobile communications	S-band	14 April 2008	Atlas V 421	Known as EchoStar G1	Active
Galaxy 28	United States	Intelsat	Television broadcasting	22 C-band, 36 Ku-band, 24 Ka-band	23 June 2005	Zenit-3SL	Known as EchoStar G1	Active
Galaxy 31	United States	Intelsat	Communications	C-band	12 November 2022	Falcon 9	Also known as Galaxy 23R	Active
Galaxy 32	United States	Intelsat	Communications	C-band	12 November 2022	Falcon 9	Also known as Galaxy 17R	Active
Galaxy 35	United States	Intelsat	Communications	C-band	13 December 2022	Ariane 5 ECA	Also known as Galaxy 3CR	Active
Galaxy 36	United States	Intelsat	Communications	C-band	13 December 2022	Ariane 5 ECA	Also known as Galaxy 28R	Active
Galaxy 37	United States	Intelsat	Communications	C-band	3 August 2023	Falcon 9	Also known as Galaxy 13R	Active
Intelsat 14	United States	Intelsat	Television broadcasting	40 C-band, 22 Ku-band	23 November 2009	Atlas V 431		Active
Intelsat 17	United States	Intelsat	Television broadcasting	28 C-band, 46 Ku-band	26 November 2010	Ariane 5 ECA		Active
Intelsat 19	United States	Intelsat	Television broadcasting	24 C-band, 34 Ku-band	1 June 2012	Zenit-3SL		Active
Intelsat 20	United States	Intelsat	Satellite internet	24 C-band, 54 Ku-band 1 Ka-band	2 August 2012	Ariane 5 ECA		Active
Intelsat 30	United States	Intelsat	Television broadcasting	10 C-band, 72 Ku-band	16 October 2014	Ariane 5 ECA		Active
Intelsat 31	United States	Intelsat	Television broadcasting	10 C-band, 72 Ku-band	16 October 2014	Ariane 5 ECA		Active
Intelsat 39	United States	Intelsat	Television broadcasting and satellite internet	C-band and Ku-band	6 August 2019	Ariane 5 ECA		Active
Intelsat 40e/TEMPO	United States	Intelsat / NASA	Satellite internet, Earth observation	C-band and 42 Ku-band, TEMPO	7 April 2023	Falcon 9		Active
iPStar 1	Thailand	Thaicom	Television broadcasting	87 Ku-band, 10 Ka-band	11 August 2005	Ariane 5 GS		Active
NBN-Co 1A	Australia	NBN Co	Satellite internet	Ka-band	30 September 2015	Ariane 5 ECA	Known as Sky Muster 1	Active
NBN-Co 1B	Australia	NBN Co	Satellite internet	Ka-band	5 October 2015	Ariane 5 ECA	Known as Sky Muster 2	Active
NSS 12	Netherlands	SES S.A.	Communications	40 C-band, 48 Ku-band	29 October 2009	Ariane 5 ECA		Active
Optus C1	Australia	Optus	Communications	24 Ku-band, 1 Ka-band	11 June 2003	Ariane 5 G	Known as Optus and Defense C1	Active
PSN-6	Indonesia	PT Pasifik Satelit Nusantara	Satellite internet and television broadcasting	26 C-band, 18 Ku-band	22 February 2019	Falcon 9	Known as Nusantara 1	Active
QuetzSat 1	Mexico	SES S.A.	Television broadcasting	32 Ku-band	29 September 2011	Proton-M Phase 3		Active
SATMEX 6	Mexico	Satmex	Television broadcasting and satellite internet	36 C-band, 24 Ku-band	27 May 2006	Ariane 5 ECA	Known as Eutelsat 113 West A	Active
SATMEX 8	Mexico	Satmex	Television broadcasting and satellite internet	24 C-band, 40 Ku-band	26 March 2013	Proton-M Phase 3	Known as Eutelsat 117 West A	Active
SES 4	Netherlands	SES S.A.	Communications	52 C-band, 72 Ku-band	14 February 2012	Proton-M Phase 3		Active
SES-5	Netherlands	SES S.A.	Television broadcasting	24 C-band, 36 Ku-band	9 July 2012	Proton-M Phase 3	Known as Astra 4B	Active
Sirius FM-5	United States	Sirius Satellite Radio	Satellite radio	1 X-band	30 June 2009	Proton-M Phase 2	Known as Radiosat 5	Active
Sirius FM6	United States	Sirius Satellite Radio	Satellite radio	1 X-band	25 October 2013	Proton-M Phase 3	Known as Radiosat 6	Active
Star One C4	Brazil	Star One	Television broadcasting	48 Ku-band	15 July 2015	Ariane 5 ECA		Active
Star One D1	Brazil	Star One	Television broadcasting	28 C-band, 24 Ku-band, 18 Ka-band	21 December 2016	Ariane 5 ECA		Active
Star One D2	Brazil	Star One	Television broadcasting	28 C-band, 24 Ku-band, 18 Ka-band	30 July 2021	Ariane 5 ECA		Active
SXM 8	United States	SiriusXM	Satellite radio	S-band	6 June 2021	Falcon 9		Active
SXM 9	United States	SiriusXM	Satellite radio	S-band	5 December 2024	Falcon 9		Active
SXM 10	United States	SiriusXM	Satellite radio	S-band	7 June 2025	Falcon 9		Active
SXM 11	United States	SiriusXM	Satellite radio	S-band	29 June 2026	Falcon 9		Commissioning
SXM 12	United States	SiriusXM	Satellite radio	S-band	202x			Awaiting launch
Telkom 4	United States	Telkom Indonesia	Communications	60 C-band	07 August 2018	Falcon 9	Known as Merah Putih	Active
Telstar 18V	United States	Telesat	Communications	C-band, Ku-band	10 September 2018	Falcon 9	Known as APStar 5C	Active
Telstar 19V	United States	Telesat	Communications	Ku-band, Ka-band	22 July 2018	Falcon 9		Active
ViaSat-1	United States	Viasat, Inc.	Communications	Ku-band	19 October 2011	Proton-M Phase 3		Active
XM 5	United States	XM Satellite Radio	Satellite radio	Ku-band	14 October 2010	Proton-M Phase 3		Active
Eutelsat 7C	International	Eutelsat	Communications	44 Ku-band	20 June 2019	Ariane 5 ECA		Active
Psyche	United States	NASA	Asteroid Orbiter		13 October 2023	Falcon Heavy	Known as Discovery 14	Active

=== Cancelled ===
Satellite	Country	Operator	Type	Coverage	Rocket	Status
AssureSat 1	United States	AssureSat	Communications	36 C-band, 36 Ku-band	Zenit-3SL	Cancelled
AssureSat 2	United States	AssureSat	Communications	36 C-band, 36 Ku-band	Zenit-3SL	Cancelled
Fordsat 1	United States	Ford Aerospace	Communications	54 C-band, Ku-band	Space Shuttle	Cancelled
Fordsat 2	United States	Ford Aerospace	Communications	54 C-band, Ku-band	Space Shuttle	Cancelled
Fordsat 3	United States	Ford Aerospace	Communications	54 C-band, Ku-band	Space Shuttle	Cancelled
L-Star 1	Thailand	ABCN	Communications	32 Ku-band	Ariane 4	Cancelled
L-Star 2	Thailand	ABCN	Communications	32 Ku-band	Ariane 4	Cancelled
M2A	Indonesia	PT Pasifik Satelit Nusantara	Communications	84 C-band, X-band	Delta IV (5,4)	Cancelled
Sirius FM4	United States	Sirius Satellite Radio	Satellite radio	X-band		Not launched
AMOS 8	United States	Spacecom	Communications	Ku-band, Ka-band	Falcon 9	Cancelled
CMBStar-1	United States	EchoStar	Television broadcasting		Proton-M Phase 3	Cancelled
S2M 1	United Arab Emirates	MSS	Mobile communications		Proton-M Phase 3	Cancelled
SATMEX 7	Mexico	Satmex	Television broadcasting	24 C-band, 24 Ka-band		Cancelled
Telstar 9	United States	Telesat	Television broadcasting	22 C-band, 36 Ku-band, 24 Ka-band		Cancelled
OSAM 1 (Restore-L)	United States	NASA	Satellite servicing	Restore-L, SPIDER		Cancelled

== Failures ==
The Lanteris 1300 had a series of failures in 2001. Since that time, electrical failures (Intelsat 7, PAS 6, Galaxy 27) and failure of the satellite's solar panels to properly deploy (Estrela do Sul 1, Telstar 14R, Intelsat 19) are recurring issues.

Satellite	Operator	Detail	Failure Date
Echostar 5	Echostar	Dual momentum wheel failures.	2001-07 and 2003–12
Echostar 6	Echostar	Partial thruster failure.	2001
Telstar 14 / Estrela do Sul 1	Telesat	Solar panel deployment failure.	2004-01-11
Telstar 14R / Estrela do Sul 2	Telesat	Solar panel deployment failure.	2011-05-20
GOES 9	NOAA	Momentum wheel problems.	1998-06-01
PAS 6	PanAmSat	Total power loss.	2004-03-17 and 2004-04-01
Intelsat 7	Intelsat	Partial power loss.	2001-09-06
Galaxy 26	Intelsat	Multiple system failures. Control processor failure.	2001 and 2008-06-28
Galaxy 27	Intelsat	Electrical failure.	2004-11-28.
DirecTV 6	DirecTV	Solar flare damage.	1997-04
Intelsat 19	Intelsat	Solar panel deployment failure.	2012-06-01
SXM 7	SiriusXM	Unknown failure during in-orbit testing.	2021-01-27
