= Satmex =

Mexican satellite company

SATMEX
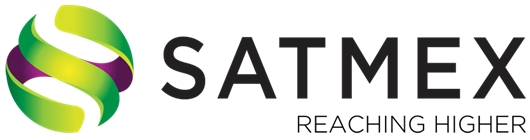
- Founded: 1997
- Defunct: 2014
- Fate: acquisition, by Eutelsat
- Headquarters: Mexico City
- Parent: Loral Space & Communications
- Website: www.eutelsatamericas.com/en/home.html www.satmex.com

Satmex (Satélites Mexicanos) was a company set up in Mexico in the mid-1990s through 2014 that operated space communication satellites that provide services to the Americas. In 2014, it was acquired by Eutelsat, and Eutelsat now operates the three satellites formerly operated by Satmex.

== History ==
SATMEX existed as a company from approximately 1997 until 2014, when it was acquired by Eutelsat. At the time of the acquisition in 2014, SATMEX had three operating satellites prior to the sale to Eutelsat: Satmex 8, Satmex 6, Satmex 5. The three communication satellites provide local, regional and continental coverage in C band and K_{u} band.

=== Timeline ===
1968
Mexico becomes a subscriber of the Intelsat system. The first Mexican satellite facilities in the state of Hidalgo. The transmission of the 1968 Summer Olympics is made through color television.

1970
Capacity of an Intelsat satellite is used for domestic services.

1982
The Communications and Transports Secretary (SCT) hires Hughes to build the Mexican satellite system "Morelos" (two HS-376 geostationary satellites, stabilized by rotation).

1985
June 17: Morelos I is launched from Cape Canaveral aboard the 51-G crewed mission of NASA.
The satellite successfully reaches the 113 ° W orbital position, with national coverage.
Construction of Iztapalapa Control Center, located in Mexico City.
November 27: Morelos II was launched from Cape Canaveral aboard the shuttle Atlantis (OV-104), on NASA's crewed mission 61-B, in which the first Mexican astronaut participated. The satellite occupied the orbital position of 116.8 ° W, with national coverage.

1989
Telecomm (Mexico Telecommunications) is created, a decentralized body becomes the Morelos Satellite System Operator.

1991
May: Telecomm hires Hughes for the construction of the Solidaridad Satellites. It consists of two HS-601 geostationary satellites with tri-axial stabilization, which were designed to provide C-band services in México, the southern United States and the rest of Latin America, with Ku-band services in Mexico and the United States.

1993
November 19: Launch of Solidaridad 1 aboard an Ariane 4 from Kourou, French Guiana. The satellite successfully reaches its orbital position of 109.2 ° W.

1994
October 7: Launch of Solidaridad 2 aboard an Ariane 4 from Kourou, French Guiana. The satellite successfully reaches its orbital position at 113 ° W.
In May opens de Satellite Control Center in Hermosillo

1995 – 1996
Beginning of the privatization process of the Fixed Satellite Services sector of Telecomm.

1997
Hughes is asked to build the Morelos 3 (today SATMEX_5) with coverage for the C and Ku bands throughout the Americas.
June 26: The Fixed Satellite Services section of Telecomm is registered under Mexican law and was constituted as the company Satélites Mexicanos, S.A. de C.V. (SATMEX). The company is still owned by the Mexican State. After performing a public tenure, the alliance integrated by Principia and Loral Space & Communications acquires 75% of SATMEX. The Mexican government owns 25% with non-voting capabilities in the council. SATMEX attracts an investment of U.S. $645 million to Mexico.

1998
The new management team isincorporated to the company. New administration tools and executive management are integrated to consolidate a new SATMEX.
On December 5, SATMEX_5 is launched into space aboard an Ariane 4L launch vehicle departing from Kourou, French Guiana.

2000
Internationalization and growth of revenue base. Robust participation of the company in financial and industry forums worldwide. Solidaridad 1 is lost due to a short circuit generated by the growth of tin filaments in the redundant processor.

2001
SATMEX is certified with ISO 9001:2000 in Engineering and Satellite Operations including the Traffic and Customer Support Departments.
This certification accounts for its two control centers, engineering and satellite operations, access and satellite monitoring and customer support.
The first SATMEX's Users Group meeting in Cancun, Mexico.

2009
Development and implementation of the first Strategic Map, that consolidates the company's strategic objectives for the next five years.

2010
The restructuring process of SATMEX begins, as well as the construction of the SATMEX_8 satellite to replace SATMEX_5.

2011
Satmex filed for prepackaged Chapter 11 bankruptcy on April 6, 2011 in an effort to eliminate the majority of its debt. The company raised around $325 in financing and $92.6 million in new equity. The company previously filed for Chapter 11 bankruptcy in 2006.

2014
On May 21 Eutelsat Americas realigned its satellite names with the Eutelsat brand: Satmex 5 = EUTELSAT 115 West A; Satmex 6 = EUTELSAT 113 West A; Satmex 8 = EUTELSAT 117 West A.

March 7 Satmex was renamed Eutelsat Americas.

On January 2 Eutelsat Communications announced closure of the transaction to acquire 100% of the share capital of Satélites Mexicanos, S.A. de C.V. (“Satmex”) having obtained all required government and regulatory approvals. As previously communicated, the transaction amounts to 831 million$. Based in Mexico, Satmex operates three satellites at contiguous positions, 113° West (Satmex 6), 114.9° West (Satmex 5) and 116.8° West (Satmex 8) that cover 90% of the population of the Americas.

2015
Eutelsat 115 West B (former SATMEX 7) was ordered by Satmex but after the acquisition by Eutelsat was renamed. It was built on Boeing 702SP satellite bus that was launched in a pair with the similar ABS 3A satellite. The first pair was launched on SpaceX Falcon 9 launch vehicle on March 2, 2015.

2016
The Eutelsat 117 West B (former SATMEX9) was launched with the similar ABS 2A, and the pair was operational on June 15, 2016.

== Ground infrastructure ==
SATMEX has two different types of Control Centers. The Satellite Control Centers are responsible for the operation of Satmex's satellite fleet, and they are located in Mexico City and in Hermosillo, Sonora.

The Communications Control Centers (CCC) monitor the signals sent through Satmex's satellites and verify that users are operating within the assigned parameters. Satmex has Communications Control Centers in its corporate offices and in the both Satellite Control Centers.

== Satellite systems ==
Name	Manufacturer	Start	Rocket	Launch site	NSSDC-ID	GEO position	Notes
Morelos 1	Hughes	17/6/1985	Discovery (STS-51-G)	KSC	1985-048B	113 W	Decommissioned
Morelos 2	Hughes	27/11/1985	Atlantis (STS-61-B)	KSC	1985-109B	116.8 W	Decommissioned
Solidaridad 1	Hughes	17/11/1993	Ariane 4	Kourou	1993-073A	109.2 W	Decommissioned
Solidaridad 2	Hughes	17/10/1994	Ariane 4	Kourou	1994-065A	114.9 W	Decommissioned
Satmex 5	Hughes	05/12/1998	Ariane 4	Kourou	1998-070A	114.9 W	Original name: Morelos 3; current status: Unknown.
Satmex 6	Space Systems/Loral	27/05/2006	Ariane 5	Kourou	2006-020A	113.0 W	Operational
Satmex 7	Boeing	02/03/2015	Falcon 9 v1.1	KSC			Operational
Satmex 8	Space Systems/Loral	26/03/2013	Proton-M	Baikonur	2013-012A	116.8 W	Operational
Satmex 9	Boeing	15/06/2016	Falcon 9 v1.1	KSC			Operational
