= Galaxy 27 =

Communications satellite

- Names: G-27; Telstar 7 Intelsat Americas 7 IA-7
- Mission type: Communications
- Operator: Intelsat
- COSPAR ID: 1999-052A
- SATCAT no.: 25922
- Website: http://www.intelsat.com
- Mission duration: 12 years (planned); 26 years, 7 months, 19 days (elapsed)

Spacecraft properties
- Spacecraft type: Galaxy
- Bus: LS-1300
- Manufacturer: Space Systems/Loral
- Launch mass: 3,790 kg (8,360 lb)
- Dry mass: 1,537 kg (3,389 lb)

Start of mission
- Launch date: 25 September 1999, 06:29 UTC
- Rocket: Ariane 4LP (V121)
- Launch site: Centre Spatial Guyanais, ELA-2
- Contractor: Arianespace
- Entered service: November 1999

End of mission
- Disposal: Graveyard orbit

Orbital parameters
- Reference system: Geocentric orbit
- Regime: Geostationary orbit
- Slot: 66° West

Transponders
- Band: 48 transponders: 24 C-band; 24 Ku-band
- Bandwidth: 36 MHz
- Coverage area: North America

Galaxy 27 is a communications satellite owned by Intelsat. It was at first located at 129° West longitude, serving most of the North America market. It was built by Space Systems/Loral, as part of its LS-1300 line. Galaxy 27 was formerly known as Intelsat Americas-7 and Telstar-7.

This satellite experienced a power failure of several days in 2004 and returned to service with reduced capacity.

In May 2011, Galaxy 27 was redeployed to 45.1° East longitude in order to expand Intelsat's services in West Asia. In October 2013, Intelsat moved the satellite to an inclined orbit at 66° East. At its inclined orbit of 2.4° at 66° East, Galaxy 27 is in a collocated orbit with Intelsat 17.
