= CMBStar-1 =

Communications satellite

EchoStar XIII, also known as CMBStar-1, was an American geostationary communications satellite project that was to be built by Space Systems/Loral (SSL) and was to be operated by EchoStar, but was eventually canceled.
