= EchoStar XI =

Geostationary communications satellite

- Mission type: Communication
- Operator: EchoStar
- COSPAR ID: 2008-035A
- SATCAT no.: 33207
- Mission duration: 15 years (planned)

Spacecraft properties
- Bus: LS-1300
- Manufacturer: SSL
- Launch mass: 5,511 kilograms (12,150 lb)
- Dry mass: 2,479 kilograms (5,465 lb)

Start of mission
- Launch date: July 16, 2008, 05:20 UTC
- Rocket: Zenit-3SL
- Launch site: Ocean Odyssey
- Contractor: Sea Launch

Orbital parameters
- Reference system: Geocentric
- Regime: Geostationary
- Longitude: 110° West
- Inclination: 0 degrees
- Period: 1,437.0 minutes

Transponders
- Band: 29 K_{u} band
- Coverage area: Contiguous United States

EchoStar XI, also known as EchoStar 11, is an American geostationary communications satellite which is operated by EchoStar on behalf of Dish Network. It is positioned in Geostationary orbit at a longitude of 110° West, from where it is used to provide direct broadcasting services to the United States.

EchoStar XI was built by SSL, and is based on the LS-1300 satellite bus. It is equipped with 29 K_{u} band transponders, and at launch it had a mass of 5,511 kilograms (12,150 lb), with an expected operational lifespan of 16 years. The satellite was launched on 16 July 2008 using a Sea Launch Zenit-3SL carrier rocket flying from the Ocean Odyssey launch platform in the equatorial Pacific Ocean about 1,400 nautical miles (2,600 km; 1,600 mi) south of Hawaii.

== See also ==
- 2008 in spaceflight
