= Liquid apogee engine =

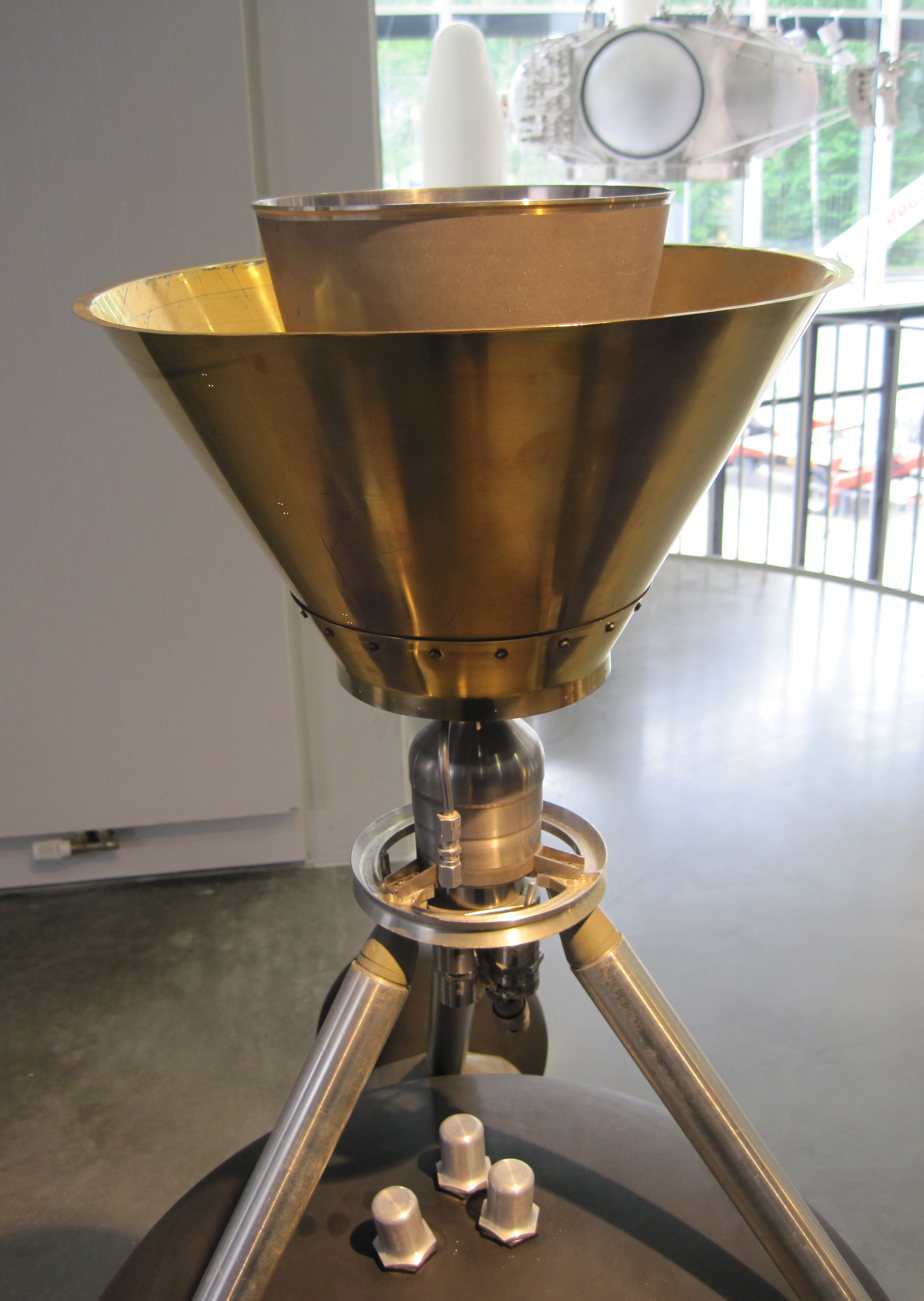
A 400 N hypergolic liquid apogee engine, including heat shield and mounting structure, on display at DLR visitors center, Lampoldshausen, Germany. The engine was designed for use on Symphonie satellites. These were the first three-axis stabilised communication satellites in geostationary orbit to use a liquid bipropellant apogee engine for orbit insertion.

A liquid apogee engine (LAE), or apogee engine, refers to a type of chemical rocket engine typically used as the main engine in a spacecraft.

The name apogee engine derives from the type of manoeuvre for which the engine is typically used, i.e. an in-space delta-v change made at the apogee of an elliptical orbit in order to circularise it. For geostationary satellites, this type of orbital manoeuvre is performed to transition from a geostationary transfer orbit and place the satellite on station in a circular geostationary orbit. Despite the name, an apogee engine can be used for a range of other manoeuvres, such as end-of-life deorbit, Earth orbit escape, planetary orbit insertion and planetary descent/ascent.

In some parts of the space industry an LAE is also referred to as a liquid apogee motor (LAM), a liquid apogee thruster (LAT) and, depending on the propellant, a dual-mode liquid apogee thruster (DMLAT). Despite the ambiguity with respect to the use of engine and motor in these names, all use liquid propellant. An apogee kick motor (AKM) or apogee boost motor (ABM) such as the Waxwing, however, uses solid propellant. These solid-propellant versions are not used on new-generation satellites.

== History ==
The apogee engine traces its origin to the early 1960s, when companies such as Aerojet, Rocketdyne, Reaction Motors, Bell Aerosystems, TRW Inc. and The Marquardt Company were all participants in developing engines for various satellites and spacecraft.

Derivatives of these original engines are still used today and are continually being evolved and adapted for new applications.

== Layout ==
A typical liquid apogee engine scheme could be defined as an engine with:

- pressure-regulated hypergolic liquid bipropellant feed,
- thermally isolated solenoid or torque motor valves,
- injector assembly containing (though dependent on the injector) central oxidant gallery and outer fuel gallery,
- radiative and film-cooled combustion chamber,
- characteristic velocity limited by thermal capability of combustion chamber material,
- Thrust coefficient limited by supersonic area ratio of the expansion nozzle.

To protect the spacecraft from the radiant heat of the combustion chamber, these engines are generally installed together with a heat shield.

== Propellant ==
Apogee engines typically use one fuel and one oxidizer. This propellant is usually, but not restricted to, a hypergolic combination such as:

- N_{2}H_{4} (hydrazine)/N_{2}O_{4} (nitrogen tetroxide),
- MMH/N_{2}O_{4},
- UDMH/N_{2}O_{4}.

Hypergolic propellant combinations ignite upon contact within the engine combustion chamber and offer very high ignition reliability, as well as the ability for reignition.

In many instances mixed oxides of nitrogen (MON), such as MON-3 (nitrogen tetroxide with 3 wt% nitric oxide), is used as a substitute for pure nitrogen tetroxide.

The use of hydrazine is under threat in Europe due to REACH regulations. In 2011 the REACH framework legislation added hydrazine to its candidate list of substances of very high concern. This step increases the risk that the use of hydrazine will be prohibited or restricted in the near- to mid-term.

Exemptions are being sought to allow hydrazine to be used for space applications, however to mitigate this risk, companies are investigating alternative propellants and engine designs. A change over to these alternative propellants is not straightforward, and issues such as performance, reliability and compatibility (e.g. satellite propulsion system and launch-site infrastructure) require investigation.

== Performance ==
The performance of an apogee engine is usually quoted in terms of vacuum specific impulse and vacuum thrust. However, there are many other details which influence performance:

- The characteristic velocity is influenced by design details such as propellant combination, propellant feed pressure, propellant temperature, and propellant mixture ratio.
- The thrust coefficient is influenced primarily by the nozzle supersonic area ratio.

A typical 500 N-class hypergolic liquid apogee engine has a vacuum specific impulse in the region of 320 s, with the practical limit estimated to be near 335 s.

Though marketed to deliver a particular nominal thrust and nominal specific impulse at nominal propellant feed conditions, these engines actually undergo rigorous testing where performance is mapped over a range of operating conditions before being deemed flight-qualified. This means that a flight-qualified production engine can be tuned (within reason) by the manufacturer to meet particular mission requirements, such as higher thrust.

== Operation ==
Most apogee engines are operated in an on–off manner at a fixed thrust level. This is because the valves used only have two positions: open or closed.

The duration for which the engine is on, sometimes referred to as the burn duration, depends both on the manoeuvre and the capability of the engine. Engines are qualified for a certain minimal and maximal single-burn duration.

Engines are also qualified to deliver a maximal cumulative burn duration, sometimes referred to as cumulative propellant throughput. The useful life of an engine at a particular performance level is dictated by the useful life of the materials of construction, primarily those used for the combustion chamber.

== Applications ==
A simplified division can be made between apogee engines used for telecommunications and exploration missions:

1. Present telecommunication spacecraft platforms tend to benefit more from high specific impulse than high thrust. The less fuel is consumed to get into orbit, the more is available for station keeping when on station. This increase in the remaining propellant can be directly translated to an increase in the service lifetime of the satellite, increasing the financial return on these missions.
2. Planetary exploration spacecraft, especially the larger ones, tend to benefit more from high thrust than high specific impulse. The quicker a high delta-v manoeuvre can be executed, the higher the efficiency of this manoeuvre, and the less propellant is required. This reduction in the propellant required can be directly translated to an increase in the bus and payload mass (at design stage), enabling better science return on these missions.

The actual engine chosen for a mission is dependent on the technical details of the mission. More practical considerations such as cost, lead time and export restrictions (e.g. ITAR) also play a part in the decision.

== See also ==
- Rocket engine
