= International Launch Services =

Company that manages commercial launches of the Angara and Proton launch vehicles

- Company type: Private
- Industry: Aerospace and defense
- Founded: 10 June 1995; 31 years ago
- Headquarters: Reston, Virginia, U.S.
- Key people: Tiphaine Louradour, President
- Products: Angara rocket Proton rocket
- Number of employees: < 60
- Parent: Khrunichev State Research and Production Space Center
- Website: www.ilslaunch.com

International Launch Services, Inc. (ILS) is a joint venture with exclusive rights to the worldwide sale of commercial Angara and Proton rocket launch services. Proton launches take place at the Baikonur Cosmodrome in Kazakhstan while Angara is launched from the Plesetsk and Vostochny Cosmodrome in Russia.

== Ownership ==
ILS was formed in 1995 as a private spaceflight partnership between Lockheed Martin (LM), Khrunichev and Energia. ILS initially co-marketed non-military launches on both the American Atlas and the Russian Proton expendable launch vehicles.

With the Atlas V launch of the SES Astra 1KR satellite on 20 April 2006, ILS had made 100 launches, 97 of which were successful.

In September 2006, Lockheed-Martin announced its intention to sell its ownership interests in Lockheed Khrunichev Energia International, Inc. (LKEI) and International Launch Services, Inc. (ILS) to Space Transport Inc. Space Transport Inc. was formed specifically for this transaction by Mario Lemme, who has been a consultant to ILS since its inception and a board member for more than three years.

The transaction between Lockheed Martin and Space Transport Inc. completed in October 2006. Lockheed Martin has retained all rights related to marketing the commercial Atlas vehicle and is continuing to offer Atlas launch services to the worldwide commercial market through its subsidiary, Lockheed Martin Commercial Launch Services, Inc. (LMCLS). ILS, no longer affiliated with Lockheed Martin, continued to market the Proton launch vehicles to commercial clients. Terms of the transaction were not disclosed. All Atlas V launches are now managed by United Launch Alliance, a joint-venture between Lockheed Martin and Boeing (IDS/Defense, Space & Security/Launch Services) formed in December 2006, with all commercial Atlas V launches sub-contracted for ULA by LMCLS.

In October 2006, Krunichev spokesman said that the firm was ready to buy the stake being sold by Lockheed Martin. Russian space agency spokesman said that despite that Lockheed is selling its stake to Space Transport, Khrunichev may eventually end up owning it. He expressed the desire of the Russian side to increase its presence in the joint venture. Space Transport Inc, registered in the British Virgin Islands and headquartered in Moscow, denied that it would be selling the stake.

In May 2008, Khrunichev State Research and Production Space Center, a Russian company, acquired all of Space Transport's interest and is now the majority shareholder in ILS. ILS will remain an American company and headquarters are currently in Reston, Virginia, near Washington, D.C. where approximately 60 employees are based.

In April 2019, Glavkosmos and ILS announced that they will be working closer together in the future, in order to bring "pricing squarely in line with our customer's needs..." and to jointly work on solutions that facilitate "...better products, more services [...] and a capability to implement a broader and more flexible set of strategic launch agreements...". ILS' ownership structure remains unchanged and it continues to act independently as an American corporation. Any future change contemplated to change ILS' ownership structure, in place since 2008, would be subject to regulatory approvals.

== Proton launches ==
In May 2008, ILS had a backlog of 22 orders, totaling approximately US$2 billion, and had flown 45 commercial Proton missions since 1996.

By June 2009, the backlog had grown to 24 firm missions. The 50th ILS Proton launch took place in early 2009.

In January 2014, ILS had an order book of 14 launches worth more than US$1 billion, with up to 6 launches planned for 2014. Most Proton payloads are too massive to launch with the less powerful Falcon 9 v1.1 rocket, and there were no spare Ariane 5 launch opportunities, so Proton customers cannot easily switch to other launchers.

However, as of 2018, the Proton rockets had a very low launch rate with no commercial launches in 2018 and two commercial launches in 2019 due to multiple factors including the emergence of new commercial launch providers like SpaceX and a spate of Proton/Breeze M launch failures. In the last few years, most launch contracts for large commercial geostationary satellites — which have declined overall as more operators look at smaller spacecraft sizes — have gone to SpaceX and Arianespace.

Proton flew its last scheduled commercial mission on 9 October 2019, delivering Eutelsat 5 West B and MEV-1 to geostationary orbit.

== Atlas launches ==
After October 2006, ILS focused solely on the Proton launch vehicle, so no longer offered Atlas launches. The first Atlas launch was the Atlas IIAS Intelsat 704 launch on 10 January 1995 and the last was the Atlas V Astra 1KR launch on 20 April 2006.

== Angara launches ==
ILS began marketing the Angara rocket to commercial customers in July 2015. The company's first commercial Angara mission is expected to launch in no earlier than 2023 carrying Kompsat 6, an Earth observation satellite operated by the Korea Aerospace Research Institute, but the satellite is now planned to be launched by the Vega-C launch vehicle.

== See also ==
- NewSpace
- Glavkosmos
