= Intelsat =

Luxembourgish communications satellite services provider

Coordinates: 38°56′30″N 77°03′49″W

Intelsat S.A.

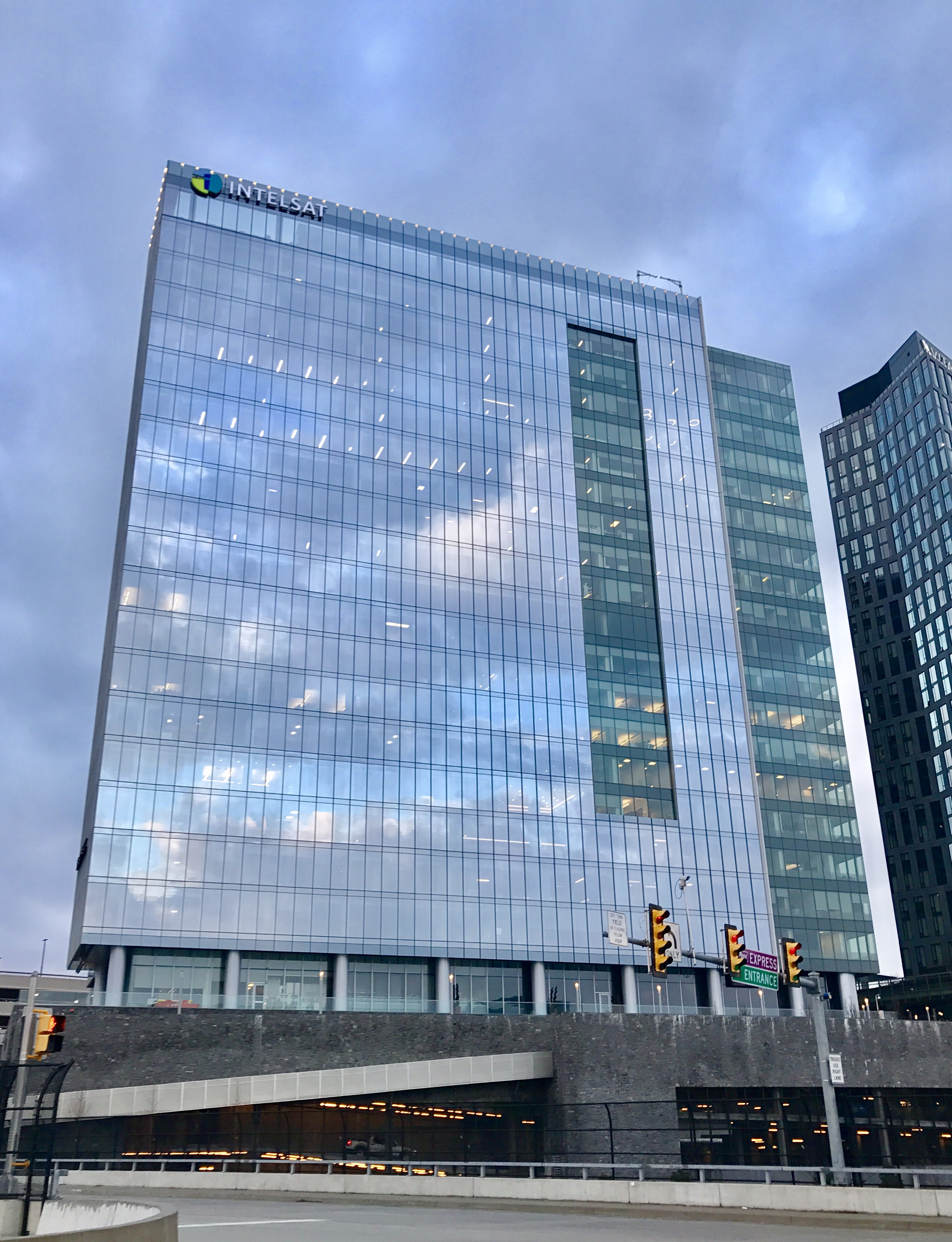
- Tysons Tower, from where Intelsat's satellite fleet is controlled
- Type: Private
- Industry: Satellite communication
- Founded: 20 August 1964; 62 years ago
- Headquarters: McLean, Virginia, United States
- Revenue: US$526.1 million (Q3, 2021)
- Owner: SES
- Number of employees: 1,790 (2021)
- Website: www.intelsat.com

Intelsat S.A. (formerly Intel-Sat, Intelsat) is a Luxembourgish-American multinational satellite services provider with corporate headquarters in Luxembourg and administrative headquarters in Tysons, Virginia, United States. Originally formed as International Telecommunications Satellite Organization (ITSO, or Intelsat), from 1964 to 2001, it was an intergovernmental consortium owning and managing a constellation of communications satellites providing international telecommunications and broadcast services.

In March 2023, rival satellite operator SES confirmed that it was in talks about a merger with Intelsat but in June 2023, it was announced that these discussions had ended. On 30 April 2024, SES announced that an agreement had been reached to acquire Intelsat for US$3.1 billion, with the transaction expected to close in the second half of 2025. The acquisition was completed on 17 July 2025.

As of June 2022, Intelsat operated a fleet of 52 communications satellites which was then one of the world's largest fleets. In 2020, the company announced plans to procure, build and launch seven C-band satellites over the next several years. These C-band satellites will contribute to the acceleration of America's 5G buildout. In early 2022, the company announced contracts for four GEO software defined satellites (SDS), two in partnership with Airbus and two in partnership with Thales Alenia Space, that are scheduled to launch in 2023. These contracts point to the pursuit of a multi-year network transformation plan with investments designed to deliver higher speeds, more flexibility, redundancy, and backwards compatibility.

As of 2022, the company served approximately 1,800 customers and employed a staff of approximately 1,790 people.

== History ==
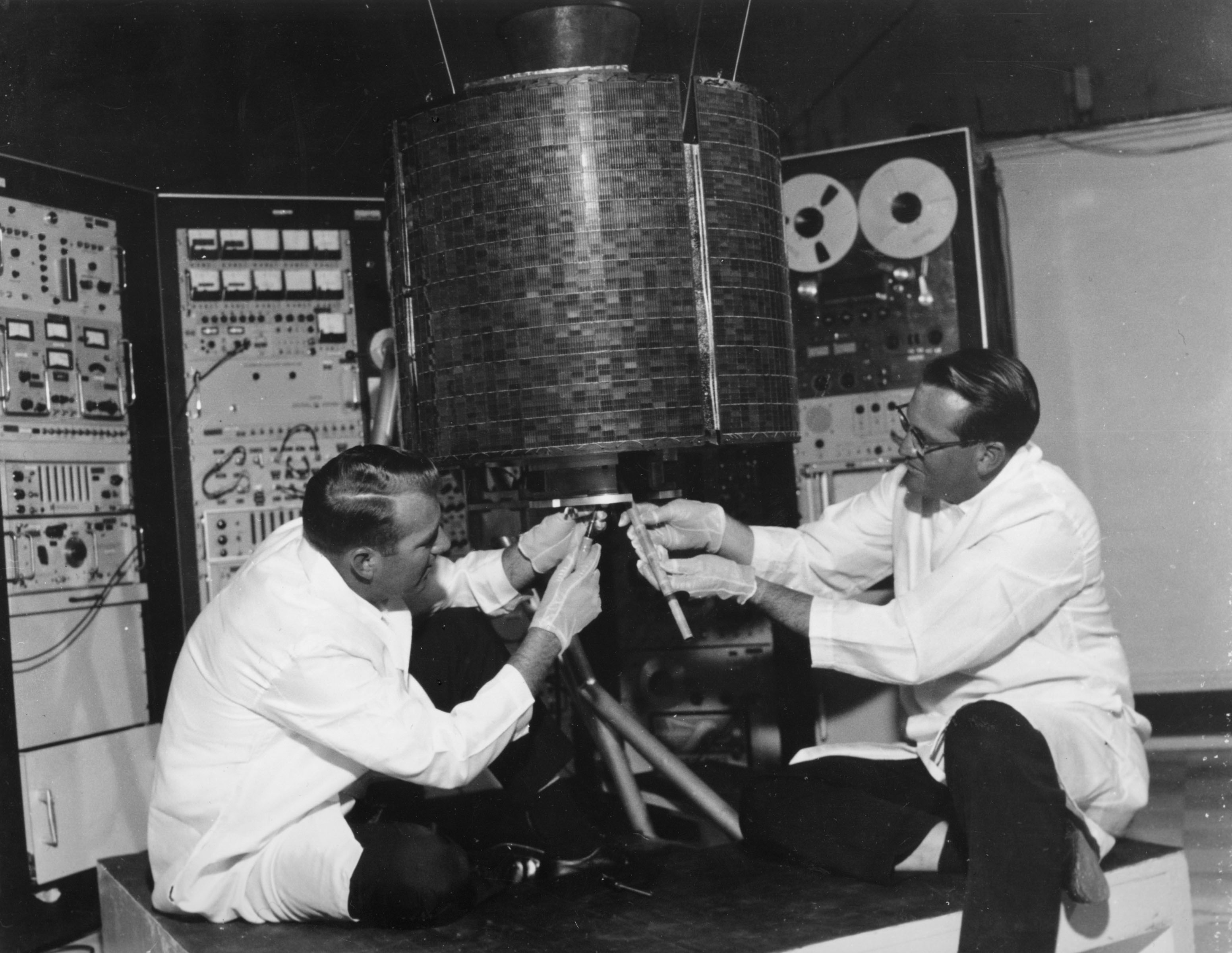
INTELSAT I Early Bird

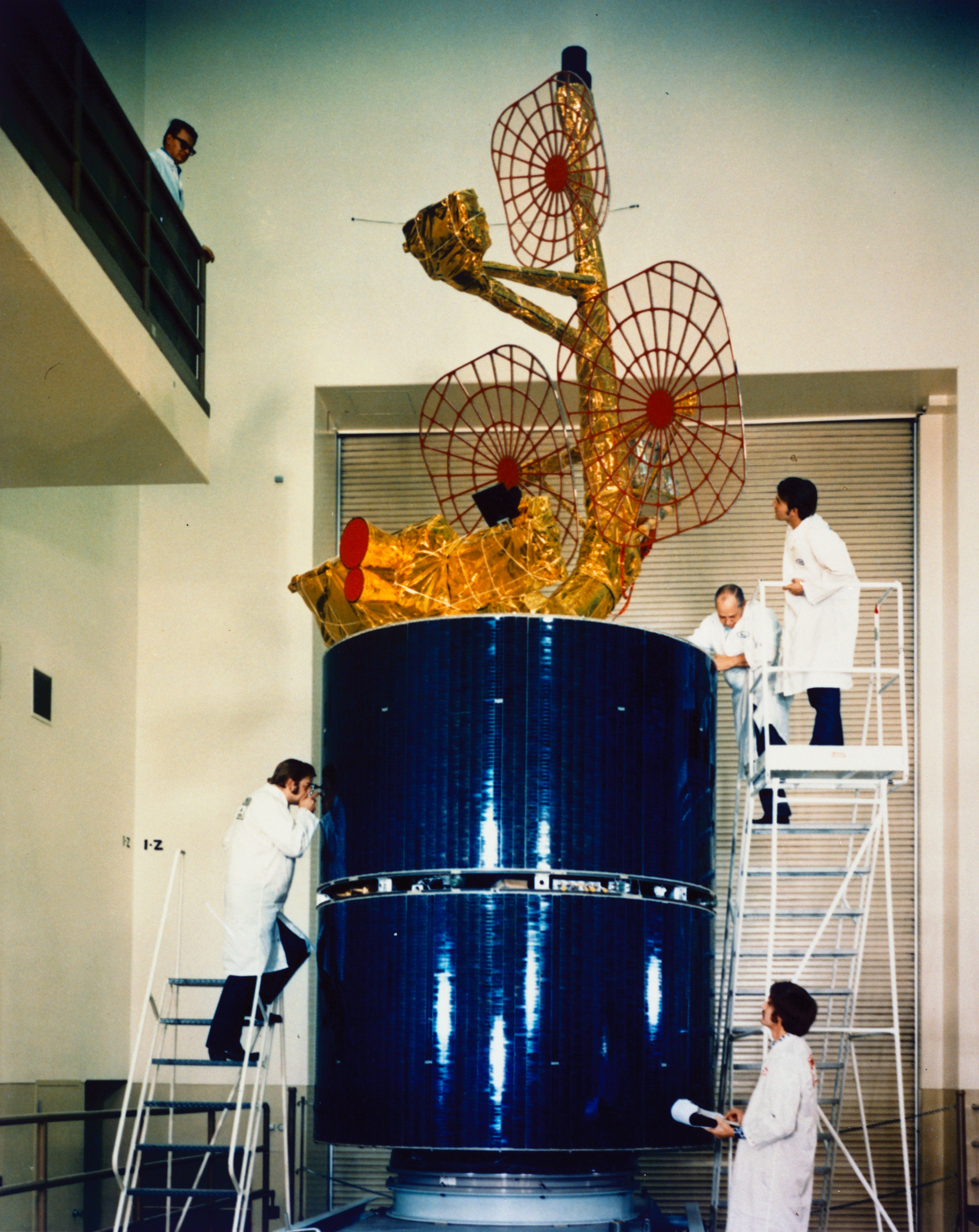
An Intelsat-IVA satellite

Intelsat logo used until 2001

John F. Kennedy instigated the creation of Intelsat with his speech to the United Nations on 25 September 1961. Less than a year later, John F. Kennedy signed the Communications Satellite Act of 1962. Intelsat was originally formed as International Telecommunications Satellite Organization (ITSO) and operated from 1964 to 2001 as an intergovernmental consortium owning and managing a constellation of communications satellites providing international broadcast services. In 2001, the international satellite market was fully commercialized, and Intelsat was privatized after 2001 as Intelsat was formed up as a private Luxembourg corporation.

=== International Governmental Organization (1964–2001) ===
The International Governmental Organization (IGO) began on (20 August 1964; 62 years ago), with 7 participating countries. The 1964 agreement was an interim arrangement on a path to a more permanent agreement. The permanent international organization was established in 1973, following inter-nation negotiations from 1969 to 1971. The most difficult issue to "resolve concerned the shift from management of the system by a national entity to management by the international organization itself".

On 6 April 1965, Intelsat's first satellite, the Intelsat I (nicknamed Early Bird), was placed in geostationary orbit above the Atlantic Ocean by a Delta D rocket.

In 1973, the name was changed and there were 81 signatories. Intelsat was "governed initially by two international agreements: The Agreement setting forth the basic provisions and principles and structure of the organization, signed by the governments through their foreign ministries, and an Operating Agreement setting forth more detailed financial and technical provisions and signed by the governments or their designated telecommunications entities", — in most cases, the latter are the ministries of communications of the party countries, but in the case of the United States, was the Communications Satellite Corporation (COMSAT), a private corporation established by federal legislation to represent the U.S. in international governance for the global communication satellite system. Intelsat at that time directly owned and managed a global communications satellite system, and structurally consisted of three parts:

- the Assembly of Parties – meeting every two years and concerned with aspects "primarily of interest to the Parties as sovereign States"—with each country having one vote.
- the Meeting of Signatories – meeting annually and composed of all the signatories to the Operating Agreement—primarily working on financial, technical and program matters, with each countries' signatory having one vote.
- a Board of Governors, meeting at least four times each year, making decisions on design, development, establishment, operation and maintenance of the in-space assets, appointed by signatories, but weighted to each signatory's "investment share" in the space assets.

The 1973 Agreement called for a seven-year transition from national to international management, but continued until 1976 to carve out "technical and operational management of the system [to the U.S. signatory] the Communications Satellite Corporation [which had also] served as the Manager of the global system under the interim arrangements in force from 1964 to 1973". Later phases of the transition resulted in full international governance by 1980. Financial contribution to the organization, its so-called "investment share", was strictly proportional to each member's use of the system, determined annually; and this corresponded to the weighted vote each would have on the Board of Governors.

As of 2018, Intelsat provides service to over 600 Earth stations in more than 149 countries, territories and dependencies. By 2001, Intelsat had over 100 members. It was also this year that Intelsat privatized and changed its name to Intelsat.

Since its inception, Intelsat has used several versions (blocks) of its dedicated Intelsat satellites. Intelsat completes each block of spacecraft independently, leading to a variety of satellite manufacturing contractors over the years. Intelsat's largest spacecraft supplier by 2012 was Space Systems/Loral, having built 47 spacecraft (Intelsat 20) by that time.

The network in its early years was not as robust as it is now. A failure of the Atlantic satellite in the spring of 1969 threatened to stop the Apollo 11 mission; a replacement satellite went into a bad orbit and could not be recovered in time; NASA used undersea cable telephone circuits as an alternative to route Apollo's communications to NASA during the mission. During the Apollo 11 moonwalk, the Moon was over the Pacific Ocean, and so other antennas were used, as well as Intelsat III, which was in geostationary orbit over the Pacific.

=== Commercialization ===
By the 1990s, building and launching satellites was no longer exclusively a government domain and as country-specific telecommunications systems were privatized, several private satellite operators arose to meet the growing demand. In the U.S., satellite operators such as PanAmSat, Orion Communications, Columbia Communications, Iridium, Globalstar, TRW and others formed under the umbrella of the Alliance for Competitive International Satellite Services (ACISS) to press for an end to the exclusively-intergovernmental organizations operating communication satellites and the monopoly position of COMSAT the U.S. signatory to Intelsat and Inmarsat. In March 2001, the U.S. Congress passed the Open-market Reorganization for the Betterment of International Telecommunications (ORBIT) Act to privatize COMSAT. In April 1998, to address U.S. government concerns about market power, Intelsat's senior management spun off five of its older satellites to a private Dutch entity, New Skies Satellites, which became a direct competitor to Intelsat.

=== Privatization ===
On 18 July 2001, Intelsat became a private company, 37 years after formation. Prior to Intelsat's privatization in 2001, ownership and investment in Intelsat (measured in shares) was distributed among Intelsat members according to their use of services. Investment shares determined each member's percentage of the total contribution needed to finance capital expenditures. The organization's primary source of revenue was satellite usage fees which, after deduction of operating costs, was redistributed to Intelsat members in proportion to their shares as repayment of capital and compensation for use of capital. Satellite services were available to any organization (both Intelsat members and non-members), and all users paid the same rates.

Intelsat Americas-7 (known formerly as Telstar 7 and known as Galaxy 27 since on 1 February 2007) experienced a several-day power failure on 29 November 2004. The satellite returned to service with reduced capacity.

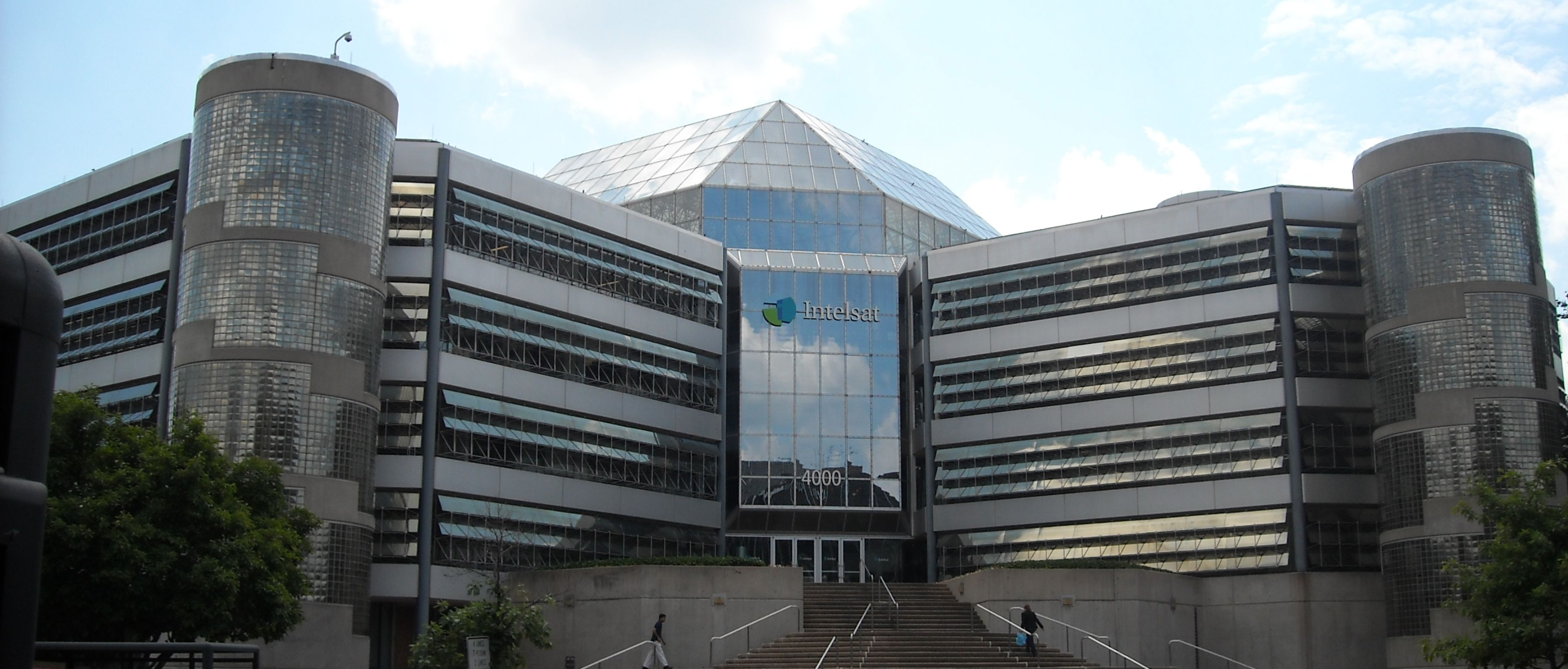
The former Intelsat administrative headquarters in Washington, D.C.

Intelsat was sold for US$3.1 billion in January 2005 to four private equity firms: Madison Dearborn Partners, Apax Partners, Permira and Apollo Global Management. The company acquired PanAmSat on 3 July 2006, and was then the world's largest provider of fixed satellite services, operating a fleet of 52 satellites in prime orbital locations.

In June 2007, BC Partners announced it had acquired 76% of Intelsat for about €3.75 billion.

=== Intelsat S.A. (Luxembourg) ===
In April 2013, the renamed Intelsat S.A. undertook an initial public offering on the New York Stock Exchange, raising a net US$550 million, of which US$492 million was paid immediately to reduce outstanding company debts of US$15.9 billion. In May 2013, the company announced it would be purchasing four new high-performance Boeing EpicNG 702 MP satellites.

In 2015, Intelsat reincorporated in Delaware and became Intelsat Corporation.

There were negotiations in 2017 that Intelsat could potentially merge with Softbank-backed OneWeb. However, on 1 June 2017, it was announced that the bondholders would not accept the offer and that the potential merger would be terminated as of 2 June 2017.

=== Operations ===
After 2014, Intelsat maintained its corporate administrative headquarters in Tysons, Virginia, where a majority of its employees worked at the time. Intelsat maintains constantly staffed global network operations centers in its Tysons Corner location and in Ellenwood, Georgia. A highly international business, Intelsat sources the majority of its revenue from non-U.S. located customers. In addition to its satellite fleet, Intelsat owns and operates eight teleports around the world.

=== Bankruptcy ===
Intelsat filed for a Chapter 11 bankruptcy in U.S. courts on 13 May 2020, just before the new 5G spectrum auctions, with over US$15 billion in total debt.

Public reporting showed that the company had been considering bankruptcy protection as early as February 2020, as Intelsat formally withdrew from the C-Band Alliance. The C-Band Alliance was an industry consortium of the major satellite operators. The consortium had been formed to lobby U.S. regulator, the Federal Communications Commission (FCC) regarding the reassignment and payment for the legacy 5G spectrum of its members.

According to company statements, the company was hoping to restructure so that it could raise requisite capital to launch new satellite technology in 2022/2023, at a cost of some US$1.6 billion. The technology could compress existing licensed C-band spectrum customers into just forty per cent of the spectrum used in 2019. The release of spectrum would enable the company to receive up to US$4.86 billion in "spectrum clearing payments" from the FCC for clearing the spectrum by December 2023, two years ahead of the FCC baseline plan.

=== Emergence from bankruptcy as a private company ===
On 24 February 2022, Intelsat emerged from Chapter 11 as a private company with a strengthened capital structure which reduced debt by more than half, from approximately $16 billion to $7 billion. The company's plan of reorganization was supported by all creditors and confirmed by the Bankruptcy Court on 16 December 2021. In connection with the emergence from bankruptcy, Intelsat also obtained $6.7 billion in new financing including a revolving credit facility, term loan, and secured notes.

According to then company CEO, Stephen Spengler, post bankruptcy, the company plans to pursue aggressive network innovation plans, and strategic growth initiatives, including building a software-defined 5G network. The company also announced a new board of directors, led by Lisa Hammitt, executive vice president and chief technology officer at Davidson Technologies.

=== Acquisition of Gogo Commercial Aviation ===
In December 2020, Intelsat completed its acquisition of Gogo's Commercial Aviation (CA) business. The vertical integration combined Intelsat's next-generation global telecommunications network with Gogo CA's customer-facing capabilities offering airlines and passengers an enhanced inflight entertainment and connectivity (IFEC) experience.

=== Acquisition by SES ===
On 30 April 2024, satellite operator, SES announced that an agreement had been reached to acquire Intelsat for €2.8 billion (US$3.1 billion) cash, alongside contingent rights related to potential future monetization of C band spectrum. The acquisition received regulatory clearance from tCompetition and Markets Authority and European Commission in 2025, alongside the Federal Communications Commission approval of relevant license and authorization transfers.

The transaction closed on 17 July 2025, with SES acquiring Intelsat Holdings S.a.r.l and its subsidiaries. The final cash consideration was approximately US $2.6 billion, together with contingent value rights.

At completion, the combined operator had approximately 90 geostationary and 30 medium earth orbit satellites. SES retained its corporate name and Luxembourg headquarters, with a signfificant presence in the US.

== In-space refueling demonstration project ==
As of March 2011, Intelsat has agreed to purchase one-half of the 2,000 kg (4,400 lb) propellant payload that an MDA Corporation spacecraft satellite-servicing demonstration project would take to geostationary orbit. Catching up in orbit with four or five Intelsat communication satellites, a load of 200 kg (440 lb) of fuel delivered to each satellite would add somewhere between two and four years of additional service life. A near-end-of-life Intelsat satellite will be moved to a graveyard orbit 200 to 300 km (120–190 mi) above the geostationary belt where the refueling will be done, "without consequence" to the Intelsat business.

As of March 2010, the business model was still evolving. MDA "could ask customers to pay per kilogram of fuel successfully added to [each] satellite, with the per-kilogram price being a function of the additional revenue the operator can expect to generate from the spacecraft's extended operational life".

The plan is that the fuel-depot vehicle would maneuver to several satellites, dock at the target satellite's apogee kick motor, remove a small part of the target spacecraft's thermal protection blanket, connect to a fuel-pressure line and deliver the propellant. "MDA officials estimate the docking maneuver would take the communications satellite out of service for about 20 minutes".

On 25 February 2020, a Northrop Grumman robotic servicing spacecraft, Mission Extension Vehicle 1 (MEV 1) docked with the Intelsat 901 satellite. The MEV 1 spacecraft has provided propulsion capabilities to Intelsat 901 to extend its usable life for five years.

== Satellites ==
=== Renaming ===
On 1 February 2007, Intelsat changed the names of 16 of its satellites formerly known under the Intelsat Americas and PanAmSat brands to Galaxy and Intelsat, respectively.

=== Launch vehicles ===
Over time, Intelsat has worked with most of the commercial launch services providers worldwide. Their satellites are often among the most massive of their generation, requiring the most powerful and reliable rockets on the market at a given time. In the 21st century, most Intelsat missions were conducted by Arianespace with the European Ariane 4 and Ariane 5 launchers, and by International Launch Services (ILS) with Proton-K and Proton-M rockets manufactured by Khrunichev in Russia. Intelsat also took advantage of the equatorial Sea Launch offering with Zenit-3SL rockets launched from the Ocean Odyssey floating platform in Pacific Ocean, until they suspended operations in 2014. On 30 May 2012, Intelsat signed a contract with SpaceX for one of the first Falcon Heavy launch vehicles, marking the return of Intelsat to American launchers after many flights on Atlas II in the 1990s and a single Atlas V launch in 2009.

== See also ==
- COMSAT
- Eutelsat
- Inmarsat
- Intelsat 708
- Intelsat Americas
- Intersputnik
- SES
