= Lanteris Space Systems =

American satellite and space systems manufacturer

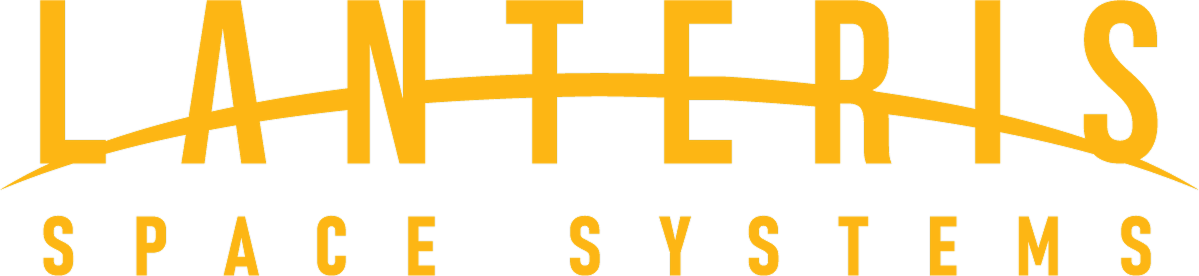
- Formerly: Philco WDL; Space Systems/Loral; Maxar Space Systems
- Type: Private
- Industry: Aerospace
- Founded: 1957; 69 years ago (as Philco WDL); 1990; 36 years ago (as Space Systems/Loral)
- Headquarters: Palo Alto, California, United States
- Revenue: 635 millions $ (2025)
- Number of employees: 2900
- Parent: Intuitive Machines
- Website: lanterisspace.com

Lanteris Space Systems (formerly Space Systems/Loral, SS/L, SSL and, most recently, Maxar Space Systems) is an American manufacturer of satellites and space systems. It designs and builds satellites and space systems for a wide variety of government and commercial customers.

Its products include high-powered direct-to-home broadcast satellites, commercial weather satellites, digital audio radio satellites, Earth observation satellites and spot-beam satellites for data networking applications.

Based in Palo Alto, California, its major competitors are Boeing Satellite Systems, Lockheed Martin, Thales Alenia Space, Airbus Defence and Space and JSC Information Satellite Systems.

== History ==
Company logo used 1990–2012

Company logo used 2013–2017

Company logo used 2017–2025

What is now Lanteris Space Systems was formed in 1957 as the Western Development Laboratories (WDL) of Philco, whose control was assumed by the Ford Motor Company (FMC) in 1966. Years later, Ford made the Space Systems Division a stand-alone division of its Ford Aerospace (FA) unit.

In 1990, after acquiring it for $715 million, Loral Corp. changed the name of this former independent division to Space Systems/Loral. All other divisions of FA including Western Development Labs located in San Jose were also acquired by Loral at that time.

In 2012 Space Systems/Loral was acquired by the Canadian aerospace company MacDonald Dettwiler (later simply MDA) for $875 million. The company continued operating as SS/L, and by the end of 2012, simply SSL.

In 2017, MDA acquired DigitalGlobe, rebranded the combined business as Maxar Technologies, and moved its corporate headquarters from Canada to San Francisco. Maxar's Canadian units continued to use the name "MDA."

While Maxar Technologies moved its corporate headquarters to Westminster, Colorado in 2018, SSL adopted the name Maxar Space Solutions (MSS) the following year. Subsequently, Maxar sold its Canada MDA units to Northern Private Capital, while MSS transitioned its name to Maxar Space Systems.

After completing the purchase of Maxar Technologies in 2023, Advent International began operating MSS and Maxar Intelligence as separate companies. Some industry sources cited the name "Maxar Space Infrastructure" for the manufacturing business around this time.

On October 1, 2025, Maxar Space Systems rebranded as Lanteris Space Systems. On January 13, 2026, two months after announcing it would acquire Lanteris, Intuitive Machines reported that it had completed the transaction for approximately $800 million.

== Projects ==
In 1960, the Courier 1B, built by then Philco, became the world's first active repeater satellite.

Lanteris (as SSL) pioneered research in electric propulsion systems, lithium-ion power systems and the use of advanced composites on commercial satellites, which permit significant increases in the size and power of a satellite's payload and extends the satellite's on-orbit lifetime. Lanteris also developed new service-enhancing technologies such as super power systems for direct-to-user applications and ground-based beam forming, a technology that uses both satellite and terrestrial assets to provide mobile users with increased coverage and capacity capabilities.

As of March 2025, there were 99 Lanteris-built geosynchronous satellites operating in orbit.

=== Lanteris 1300 ===
Artist impression of Optus C1, built on the LS-1300 platform

Lanteris manufactures satellites based on its Lanteris 1300 series platform (previously SSL 1300, LS-1300, FS-1300) in Palo Alto. Satellites in the series include Intelsat-40, Eutelsat-7C, SiriusXM-9 and Telstar-19V. As of March 2025 there were 99 satellites based on the 1300 series platform on orbit, with four others under construction.

The company designed and built AsiaSat 8, which was launched on 5 August 2014, and AsiaSat 6, which went into orbit on 7 September 2014. The two satellite launches cost AsiaSat $110 million. The satellites were expected to last 15 years, and contain high-powered C-band transponders providing video and broadband services to the Asia-Pacific region.

==== EchoStar XVI ====
EchoStar XVI was launched in 2012 aboard the Proton Breeze M vehicle from the Baikonur Space Center in Kazakhstan.

==== COTS proposal ====
Lanteris (as SS/L) and Constellation Services International proposed a reusable space tug based on the 1300 platform and a pressure-fed, low-cost Aquarius Launch Vehicle. The tug would be used to bring supplies to the International Space Station as part of the Commercial Orbital Transportation Services (COTS) program.

NASA eventually decided to pursue another proposal for this project. Lanteris, however, continued to provide Battery Orbital Replacement Units (ORUs), Battery Charge Discharge Units (BCDUs), and Sequential Shunt Units (SSUs) for the ISS.

==== LADEE Mission ====
Lanteris designed and delivered a propulsion system based on their 1300 platform for the NASA LADEE mission. On April 17, 2014, between 9:30 p.m and 10:22 p.m. PDT, after successfully completing its goal to collect lunar dust and study the Moon's atmosphere, NASA's Lunar Atmosphere and Dust Environment Explorer (LADEE) spacecraft successfully completed a planned de-orbit, bringing an end to the mission to study the structure and composition of the thin lunar atmosphere.

==== Robotic Servicing of Geosynchronous Satellites ====
In June 2017, Lanteris was awarded the contract to design and build the satellite servicing spacecraft vehicle for the U.S. Defense Advanced Research Projects Agency (DARPA)’s Robotic Servicing of Geosynchronous Satellites (RSGS) program, which was designed to inspect, repair, and augment geosynchronous satellites and plans to include a refueling payload to extend the life of satellites that are low on propellant. Lanteris joined the Naval Research Laboratory, the Charles Draper Laboratory and Maxar's robotics divisions in Brampton, Ontario and Pasadena to develop the servicer. The servicer was designed to refuel commercial satellites, and global satellite operator SES was the first commercial customer to sign up to use the services for a satellite life extension mission.

In January 2019, Lanteris decided to abandon its participation in the program because of financial difficulties. Continued participation in the program required the company to fund the cost of the development by more than the typical 33%.

==== Psyche ====
The Psyche mission to asteroid 16 Psyche spacecraft's solar-electric propulsion chassis was built by Maxar, and launched on October 13, 2023.

=== Lanteris 500 ===
==== WorldView Legion ====
Lanteris designed and built six WorldView Legion imaging satellites for sibling company Maxar Intelligence. The satellites were launched into low earth orbit between May 2024 and February 2025.

=== Lanteris 300 ===
The Lanteris 300 bus is the smallest of Lanteris's three bus products.

The 300 bus is used for the Tranche 1 and Tranche 2 Tracking Layer for the Space Development Agency.

== See also ==
- Aerospace manufacturer
- List of spacecraft manufacturers
- Aeronutronic
- Technology companies based in the San Francisco Bay Area
