= List of satellites in geosynchronous orbit =

This is a list of satellites in geosynchronous orbit, including satellites in geosynchronous orbit. These satellites are commonly used for communication purposes, such as radio and television networks, back-haul, and direct broadcast. Traditional global navigation systems do not use geosynchronous satellites, but some SBAS navigation satellites do. A number of weather satellites are also present in geosynchronous orbits. Not included in the list below are several more classified military geosynchronous satellites, such as PAN.

A special case of geosynchronous orbit (GSO) is the geostationary orbit, which is a circular geosynchronous orbit at zero inclination (that is, directly above the equator). A satellite in a geostationary orbit appears stationary, always at the same point in the sky, to ground observers. Popularly or loosely, the term "geosynchronous" may be used to mean geostationary. Specifically, Geosynchronous Earth orbit (GEO) may be a synonym for geosynchronous equatorial orbit, or geostationary Earth orbit. To avoid confusion, geosynchronous satellites that are not in geostationary orbit are sometimes referred to as being in an inclined geostationary orbit (IGSO).

Some of these satellites are separated from each other by as little as 0.1° longitude. This corresponds to an inter-satellite spacing of approximately 73 km. The major consideration for spacing of geostationary satellites is the beamwidth at-orbit of uplink transmitters, which is primarily a factor of the size and stability of the uplink dish, as well as what frequencies the satellite's transponders receive; satellites with discontiguous frequency allocations can be much closer together.

As of July 2023, the website UCS Satellite Database lists 6,718 known satellites. Of these, 580 are listed in the database as being at GEO. The website provides a spreadsheet containing details of all the satellites, which can be downloaded.

Listings are from west to east (decreasing longitude in the Western Hemisphere and increasing longitude in the Eastern Hemisphere) by orbital position, starting and ending with the International Date Line. Satellites in inclined geosynchronous orbit are so indicated by a note in the "remarks" columns.

== Western hemisphere ==
Location	Satellite	Satellite bus	Source	Operator	Type	Coverage	Launch date, UTC, and vehicle	Remarks	
177.0°W	NSS-9	Orbital; Star-2	Luxembourg	SES	Intercontinental Voice, Video, and Internet	Pacific Ocean region	12 February 2009; Ariane 5ECA V187		
177.1°W	Yamal 300K		Russia	Gazprom Space Systems	Television and Internet	Russia	2 November 2012 Proton-M		
171.3°W	TDRS-10 (J), GE 2 (174°W)		United States	NASA			5 December 2002, Atlas IIA		
171.1°W	TDRS-11		United States	NASA			31 January 2013, Atlas V 401		
169.5°W	NSS-6	Lockheed Martin; A2100AXS	Netherlands	SES	Direct broadcasting, video distribution	Asia	17 December 2002; Ariane 44L	Ku-band satellite	
167.6°W	TDRS-5		United States	NASA			2 August 1991, Space Shuttle Atlantis		
148.0°W	EchoStar-1	Lockheed Martin AS-7000	United States	Echostar / DISH Network	Direct Broadcasting		28 December 1995, Long March 2E	Scheduled to move to 77°W	
139.0°W	AMC-6, WGS 6 (135°w)	Lockheed Martin; A2100AX	United States	SES	Comsat	North America, Greenland, Latin America	21 October 2000; Proton-K / 11September	Formerly GE-6 (1997-2001)	
83°W	AMC-18	Lockheed Martin; A2100A	United States	SES and AT&T Alascom	Comsat	Canada, United States, Mexico, Caribbean	8 December 2006; Ariane 5ECA (VA174)	Formerly GE-18	
135.0°W	AMC-4, Artemis (i=14°)	Lockheed Martin; 2100AX	United States	SES	Television and Radio Broadcasting	North America, Latin America, Caribbean	13 November 1999; Ariane 44LP H10-3 (V123)	Formerly GE-4 (1999-2001)	
135.0°W	AMC-8, Aurora-3	Lockheed Martin; 2100A	United States	SES and AT&T Alascom	Comsat	Canada, Alaska, United States, Mexico, Caribbean	20 December 2000; Ariane 5G (V138)	Formerly GE-8 (2000-2001)	
128°W	GOES 15		United States	National Environmental Satellite, Data, and Information Service (NESDIS)	Weather	North America and the Pacific Ocean basin	4 March 2010, Delta IV, Cape Canaveral Air Force Station (CCAFS), Florida		
133.0°W	Galaxy-15		United States						
131.0°W	AMC-1	Lockheed Martin; A2100	United States	SES	Television and Radio Broadcasting	Canada, United States, Mexico, Caribbean	8 September 1996; Atlas IIA	Formerly GE-1 (1996-2001)	
131.0°W	AMC-11	Lockheed Martin; A2100A	United States	SES	Television and Radio Broadcasting	Canada, Caribbean, CONUS, Mexico	19 May 2004; Atlas IIAS	Formerly GE-11 (2004)	
129.0°W	SES-15	Boeing Satellite Systems; BSS-702P	Luxembourg	SES	Aviation, government, VSAT	North America, Latin America, Caribbean, Atlantic Ocean region	18 May 2017; Soyuz ST-A / Fregat-M	Hybrid Ku-band / Ka-band / WAAS satellite	
129.0°W	Ciel-2	Thales Alenia Space Spacebus 4000C4	Canada	Ciel Satellite Group	Direct Broadcasting	North America	10 December 2008, Proton-M / Briz M	Ku-band satellite|	
129.0°W	Galaxy-12	Orbital Sciences Corporation STAR-2	United States	Intelsat	Television/Radio Broadcasting		Ariane 5G	replaced failed Galaxy 15	
127.0°W	Galaxy 13 (aka Horizons 1)	HS-601	United States	Intelsat		24 C-Band transponders	1 October 2003	Same satellite as Horizons-1	
127.0°W		HS-601	United States	Japan Satellite Systems		24 Ku-Band transponders	1 October 2003	Same satellite as Galaxy-13	
127.0°W	Galaxy 37 (Horizons 4)	LS-1300	United States	Intelsat			3 August 2023, Falcon 9 v1.2		
125.0°W	AMC-21	Orbital ATK; GEOStar-2	United States	SES	Comsat	Canada, United States, Mexico, Caribbean, Central America	14 August 2008; Ariane 5 ECA	Ku-band satellite	
123.0°W	Galaxy 18	LS-1300	United States	Intelsat	Television and radio broadcasting	North America	21 May 2008, Zenit	Hybrid C/K_{u}-band satellite	2008-11-19
121.0°W	Galaxy-23	FS-1300	United States	Intelsat	Direct Broadcasting	North America	7 August 2003	Hybrid C/K_{u}/K_{a}-band satellite; C band payload referred to as Galaxy-23	2008-11-26
121.0°W	EchoStar-9	FS-1300	United States	Echostar/DISH Network	Direct Broadcasting	North America	7 August 2003	Hybrid C/K_{u}/K_{a}-band satellite; K_{u}/K_{a}-band payload referred to as EchoStar-9	2008-11-26
121.1°W	Galaxy 31 (Galaxy 23R, PACSTAR-L4)	LS-1300	United States	Intelsat		North America	12 November 2022, Falcon 9 v1.2	C-band replacement	
119.1°W	DirecTV-7S	LS-1300	United States	DirecTV	Direct Broadcasting	54 K_{u}-band transponders	4 May 2004	8 active transponders at this time	2008-11-26
118.8°W	EchoStar-7	Lockheed Martin A2100AX	United States	Echostar/DISH Network	Direct Broadcasting	32 K_{u}-band transponders	21 February 2002, Atlas IIIB	21 active transponders at this time	2008-11-26
118.7°W	Anik F3	EADS Astrium Eurostar-3000S	Canada	Telesat Canada	Direct Broadcasting	24 C band transponders, 32 K_{u}-band transponders, 2 K_{a}-band transponders	11 April 2007, Proton	K_{u}-Band leased to Echostar/Dish Network	2008-11-26
116.8°W	SatMex 5	Hughes HS-601HP	Mexico	Satmex		24 C-band transponders, 24 Ku-band transponders	5 December 1998, Ariane 42L		2008-11-26
116.1°W	SIRIUS-FM-6						5 October 2013, ILS Proton-M		
115.2°W	XM-Blues		United States				30 October 2006, Zenit-3SL		
115°W	Solidaridad-2		Mexico	Satmex			8 October 1994, Ariane 44L		
115.1°W	ViaSat-1	LS-1300	United States	ViaSat			19 October 2011, Proton-M	56 Ka-band Transponders	2015-08-19
115°W	EUTELSAT 115 West A								2015-08-19
115° W	MEXSAT 3								2015-08-19
113°W	Satmex 6		Mexico	Satmex			27 May 2006, Ariane 5 ECA		
113.0°W	Eutelsat 113 West A	LS-1300X		Eutelsat			27 May 2006, Ariane 5 ECA		2015-08-19
111.2°W	WILDBLUE-1		United States	ViaSat					2015-08-19
111.1°W	Anik F2	Boeing 702	Canada	Telesat Canada	Direct Broadcasting		17 July 2004, Ariane 5G	Hybrid C-band / Ku-band / Ka-band satellite	
111°W	TerreStar-1	LS-1300S	United States	TerreStar Corporation		Canada, United States	1 July 2009, Ariane 5 ECA		2015-08-19
110°W	EchoStar-11	LS-1300	United States	Echostar/DISH Network	Direct Broadcasting		17 July 2008, Zenit-3SL		2008-11-19
110°W	EchoStar-10	A2100AXS	United States	Echostar/DISH Network	Direct Broadcasting		15 February 2006, Zenit-3SL		
110°W	DirecTV-5	LS-1300	United States	DirecTV	Direct Broadcasting		7 May 2002, Proton	32 Ku-band transponders	
108°W	GOES 3		United States	NOAA			16 June 1978 Delta 2914		2015-08-19
107.3°W	Anik F1	Boeing 702	Canada	Telesat Canada	Direct Broadcasting		21 November 2000, Ariane 44L	Hybrid C/K_{u}-band satellite; will be replaced by Anik F1R	
107.3°W	Anik F1R	Eurostar-3000	Canada	Telesat Canada	Direct Broadcasting, WAAS PRN #138		8 September 2005, Proton	Hybrid C/K_{u}-band satellite; will replace Anik F1	
105°W	SES-11 / EchoStar 105, Echostar 17 (107°w)	Airbus Defence and Space; Eurostar-3000	Luxembourg	SES	Direct broadcasting, VSAT	Hawaii, North America, Latin America, Caribbean	11 October 2017; Falcon 9 Full Thrust	Hybrid C/Ku-band satellite, 2012	
105°W	AMC-15	Lockheed Martin; A2100AXS	United States	SES	Direct Broadcasting	Canada, United States, Alaska, Hawaii, Mexico	14 October 2004; Proton-M / Briz-M	Hybrid Ku-/Ka-band satellite. Twin of AMC-16	
104.6°W	GOES-14		United States						2015-08-19
103.0°W	SES-3	GEOStar-2.4	United States	SES	Direct Broadcasting	North America	15 July 2011, Proton-M / Briz-M	Hybrid C/K_{u}-band satellite	
102.9°W	SPACEWAY-1	Boeing 702	United States	DirecTV	Direct Broadcasting		26 April 2005		
102.8°W	DIRECTV-10		United States						2015-08-19
102.8°W	DIRECTV-12		United States						2015-08-19
101.3°W	SkyTerra-1	Boeing 702	United States	Ligado Networks	Telecommunications	United States	14 November 2010, Proton-M		
101.2°W	DirecTV-4S	HS-601	United States	DirecTV	Direct Broadcasting		27 November 2001, Ariane 44LP	48 Ku-band transponders	
101.1°W	DirecTV-9S	LS-1300	United States	DirecTV	Direct Broadcasting		13 October 2006, Ariane 5 ECA		
101°W	SES-1	GEOStar-2.4	United States	SES	Direct Broadcasting	Canada, United States, Mexico, Caribbean, Central America	24 April 2010, Proton-M / Briz-M	Hybrid C-band / Ku-band satellite	
100.8°W	DirecTV-8	LS-1300	United States	DirecTV	Direct Broadcasting		22 May 2005, Proton	Hybrid K_{u}/K_{a}-band satellite	
99.2°W	DIRECTV-14		United States						2015-08-19
99.2°W	DIRECTV 11	BSS (HSS) 702	United States						2015-08-19
99.1°W	SPACEWAY-2		United States				16 November 2005, Ariane 5 ECA		
97°W	Galaxy-16	FS-1300		Intelsat			18 June 2006, Zenit-3SL		
98°W					Communications	Caribbean, CONUS	11 March 2005		2014-04-2
97.0°W	Galaxy-19	FS-1300	United States	Intelsat	Television and Radio Broadcasting	24 C- and 28 Ku-band transponders (North America)	24 September 2008, Zenit-3SL		2008-11-20
96.0°W	SIRIUS-FM-5								2015-08-19
95.2°W	DIRECTV-15		United States						2015-08-19
95.0°W	Galaxy 3C		United States				15 June 2002, Zenit-3SL		
95.0°W	Galaxy 35 (Galaxy 3CR)	LS-1300		Intelsat			13 December 2022, Ariane 5 ECA	C-ban replacement	
95.0°W	INTELSAT-30								2015-08-19
93.0°W	Galaxy-26	FS-1300	United States				15 February 1999, Proton-K		
94.9°W	SPACEWAY-3		United States						2015-08-19
93.1°W	GALAXY-25		United States						2015-08-19
91.1°W	Nimiq 1	A2100AX	Canada	Telesat Canada	Direct Broadcasting		20 May 1999, Proton	32 K_{u}-band transponders	
91.0°W	Galaxy 17	Spacebus 3000 B3	United States	Intelsat	Television and radio broadcasting	North America	4 May 2007, Ariane 5 ECA	Hybrid C-/Ku-band satellite	2008-06-13
91.0°W	Intelsat 40E (TEMPO)	LS-1300	United States	Intelsat			7 April 2023, Falcon 9 v1.2	C, 42 Ku-band, 3 Ka-band, NASA's TEMPO payload	
91.0°W	Galaxy 32 (Galaxy 17R)	LS-1300		Intelsat			12 November 2022, Falcon 9 v1.2	C-band replacement	
89.0°W	Galaxy-28	FS-1300	United States	Intelsat		The Americas	23 June 2005, Zenit-3SL	Hybrid C/K_{u}/K_{a}-band satellite; launched as Telstar 8	
88.9°W	Galaxy 36 (Galaxy 28R)	LS-1300		Intelsat			13 December 2022, Ariane 5 ECA	C-band replacement	
87.2°W	TKSAT-1								2015-08-19
87.0°W	SES-2	GEOStar-2.4	United States	SES	Direct Broadcasting	North America, Latin America, Caribbean	21 September 2011, Ariane 5 ECA	Hybrid C-/Ku-band satellite	
85.2°W	XM-5		United States						2015-08-19
85.1°W	XM 3 Rhythm	Boeing 702	United States	XM Satellite Radio Holdings	Radio Broadcasting	CONUS	28 February 2005, Zenit-3SL		
85.0°W	AMC-16	Lockheed Martin; A2100AXS	United States	SES	Direct Broadcasting	Canada, United States, Alaska, Hawaii, Mexico	17 December 2004; Atlas V (V521)	Hybrid Ku-/Ka-band satellite. Twin (and originally ground spare) of AMC-15	
84.0°W	Brasilsat B3		Brazil				4 February 1998, Ariane 44LP		
84.0°W	Brasilsat B4		Brazil				17 August 2000 Ariane 4LP-3		2015-08-19
83.8°W	HISPASAT-1C								2015-08-19
83.0°W	AMC-18	Lockheed Martin; LM-A2100A	United States	SES	Comsat	Canada, United States, Mexico, Caribbean	8 December 2006; Ariane 5ECA (VA174)	C-band satellite. Formerly GE-18 (Originally ground spare for of AMC-10 and AMC-11)	
82.0°W	Nimiq 2	A2100AX	Canada	Telesat Canada	Direct Broadcasting		29 December 2002, Proton	Hybrid K_{u}/K_{a}-band satellite	
82.0°W	Nimiq 3	HS-601		Telesat Canada	Direct Broadcasting		9 June 1995, Ariane 42P	Previously DirecTV-3 for DirecTV	
82.0°W	Nimiq-4	Eurostar-3000S		Telesat Canada	Direct Broadcasting		19 September 2008, Proton-M		2015-08-19
81°W	ARSAT-2	ARSAT-3K	Argentina	ARSAT	Data, Internet and TV broadcasting.	K_{u} Band: North America and South America except Brazil, C Band: Americas	30 September 2015, Ariane 5ECA		2015-10-10
80.9°W	SBS-6	HS-393	United States	Intelsat	Television and Radio Broadcasting		12 October 1990, Ariane 44L	Beyond expected end of life. Serves Argentina now	2008-06-13
79.0°W	Satcom C3		United States				10 September 1992, Ariane 44LP		
78.8°W	SKY MEXICO-1								2015-08-19
78.0°W	VENESAT-1								2015-08-19
77.0°W	EchoStar-4	A2100AX	United States	Echostar/DISH Network	Direct Broadcasting		8 May 1998, Proton	Retired	
77.0°W	EchoStar-8	FS-1300	United States	Echostar/DISH Network	Direct Broadcasting		21 August 2002, Proton	Deorbited	2008-11-19
77.0°W	QuetzSat 1	Space Systems/Loral; SSL-1300	Mexico	QuetzSat (SES)	Broadcasting	United States, Mexico	29 September 2011; Proton-M / Briz-M	Ku-band satellite	
77.1°W	ECHOSTAR-1		United States						2015-08-19
76.9°W	ECHOSTAR-8		United States						2015-08-19
76.8°W	Galaxy 4R		United States				19 April 2000, Ariane 42L	Inclined orbit	
76.2°W	INTELSAT-16								2015-08-19
75.2°W	GOES-16		United States						2015-08-19
75.0°W	Brasilsat B1		Brazil				10 August 1994, Ariane 44LP		
74.9°W	Galaxy-9		United States				24 May 1996, Delta II (7925)	spare	
74.0°W	Horizons-2	STAR Bus	United States	Intelsat JSAT	Television and Radio Broadcasting	CONUS Canada Caribbean	21 December 2007, Ariane 5GS	20 K_{u} Xpndrs	2008-06-13
72.7°W	EchoStar-6	FS-1300	United States	Echostar/DISH Network	Direct Broadcasting		14 July 2000, Atlas II-AS		2008-11-19
72.5°W	Directv-1R		United States				10 October 1999, Zenit-3SL		
72.0°W	AMC-3	Lockheed Martin; A2100A	United States	SES	Television and Radio Broadcasting	Canada, United States, Mexico, Caribbean	4 September 1997; Atlas IIAS	Formerly GE-3 (1997-2001)	
71.8°W	ARSAT-1	ARSAT-3K	Argentina		Direct Broadcasting	Argentina, Chile, Uruguay, Paraguay	16 Octobre 2014, Ariane 5ECA	First geostationary satellite built in Latin America	2015-18-08
71.0°W	Nahuel 1A		Argentina				30 January 1997, Ariane 44L		
70.0°W	STAR ONE C2								2015-08-19
69.9°W	STAR ONE C4								2015-08-19
67.0°W	SES-10	Airbus Defence and Space; Eurostar-3000	Luxembourg	SES	Direct broadcasting, VSAT	Central America, Caribbean, South America, Brazil	30 March 2017; Falcon 9 Full Thrust	Ku-band satellite	
70.0°W	Brasilsat B4		Brazil				17 August 2000, Ariane 44LP		
65.0°W	Brasilsat B2		Brazil				28 March 1995, Ariane 44LP+		
65.0°W	Star One C1	Spacebus-3000B3	Brazil	Star One	Broadcast comsat	28 C-band; 14 K_{u} band 1 X-band, covering South America	14 November 2007, Ariane 5-ECA		2015-08-19
63.0°W	Estrela do Sul 1		Brazil				11 January 2004, Zenit-3SL		
63.0°W	TELSTAR-14R		United States						2015-08-19
62.8°W	ABS-1A		United States						2015-08-19
62.2°W	TDRS-3, Angola 1 (Angosat)		United States						2015-08-19
61.5°W	ECHOSTAR-16		United States						2015-08-19
61.3°W	EchoStar-12	A2100AXS	United States				17 July 2003, Atlas V (521)	Formerly Rainbow-1, purchased from VOOM	
61.8°W	EchoStar-3	A2100AX	United States	Echostar/DISH Network	Direct Broadcasting		5 October 1997, Atlas II-AS		
61.0°W	Hispasat Amazonas		Spain	Hispasat			4 August 2004, Proton-M		
58.0°W	Intelsat-9(PAS9), Intelsat 21	HS-601HP, BSS (HS) 702	United States			28 July 2000, Zenit-3SL		formerly PAS-9	
55.5°W	Intelsat-805			Intelsat			18 June 1998, Atlas II-AS		
54.0°W	Inmarsat-3 F4		UK	Inmarsat	Maritime and Aviation Communications	Atlantic Ocean Region	3 June 1997, Arianne 44L		2014-04-2
53.0°W	Intelsat-707			Intelsat			14 March 1996, Ariane 4		
50.0°W	Intelsat-705, TDRS I (52.3°w)			Intelsat			22 March 1995, Atlas II-AS		
47.5°W	SES-14	Airbus Defence and Space; Eurostar-3000EOR	Luxembourg	SES	Cable distribution, government and enterprise VSAT, aviation and maritime mobility, broadband	Latin America, Caribbean, North America, Atlantic Ocean, West Africa	25 January 2018; Ariane 5 ECA	C-band satellite Carries NASA's GOLD payload	
45.0°W	Intelsat 14	HS702	United States				16 November 2000, Ariane 5G	formerly PAS-1R, and IS-1R	
43.1°W	Intelsat-3R	HS-601	United States				12 January 1996, Ariane 44L	formerly PAS-3R	
43.0°W	Intelsat-6B	HS-601HP					22 December 1998, Ariane 42L	formerly PAS-6B	
40.5°W	SES-6	EADS Astrium Eurostar-3000	Luxembourg	SES	Direct broadcasting, cable distribution, aviation	North America, Latin America, Europe, Atlantic Ocean	3 June 2013; Proton-M / Briz-M	Hybrid C/Ku-band satellite	
37.5°W	NSS-10	Alcatel Space; Spacebus 4000 C3	United States	SES	Television and Radio Broadcasting	North America, South America, Europe, Africa	3 February 2005; Proton-M / Briz-M	Formerly Worldsat-2 (2005); AMC-12 (2005-2009)	
37.5°W	Telstar-11N	LS-1300	United States	Telstar	Telecommunications, Video, Data	Africa, Europe, Atlantic Ocean, North and Central America	26 February 2009	39 high-power Ku-band transponders	
36°W	Hispasat AG1 (H36W1)	OHB SmallGEO	Spain	Hispasat			28 January 2017		
34.5°W	Intelsat-903			Intelsat			30 March 2002, Proton-K		
31.5°W	Intelsat-801			Intelsat			1 March 1997, Ariane 44P		
31.4°W	Galaxy-14	Orbital Sciences STAR-2	United States	Intelsat		24 C Band transponders – North America	13 August 2005, Soyuz-FG/Fregat		2008-11-20
30.0°W	Hispasat 30W-5		Spain	Hispasat			29 December 2010, Ariane 5		
30.0°W	Hispasat 30W-6		Spain	Hispasat			06 March 2018, Falcon 9		
30.0°W	Spainsat		Spain	Hisdesat, XTAR			11 Match 2006, Ariane 5		
27.5°W	Intelsat-907			Intelsat			15 February 2003, Ariane 44L		
24.5°W	Intelsat-905			Intelsat			5 June 2002, Ariane 44L		
24.0°W	Cosmos 2379		Russia					Inclined orbit	
22.0°W	SES-4	Space Systems/Loral; SSL-1300	Netherlands	SES	Video distribution, government, VSAT, maritime services	North America, South America, Europe, Middle East, West Africa	14 February 2012; Proton-M / Briz-M	Hybrid C/Ku-band satellite Originally named NSS-14	
20.0°W	NSS-7	Lockheed Martin; A2100AXS	Netherlands	SES	Video distribution, broadband	Latin America, Africa	16 April 2002; Ariane 44L	Hybrid C/Ku-band satellite	
20.0°W	Intelsat-603			Intelsat			14 March 1990, Commercial Titan III	Inclined orbit	
18.0°W	Intelsat-901			Intelsat			9 June 2001, Ariane 44L		
15.5°W	Inmarsat 3 F2		UK	Inmarsat	EGNOS PRN #120		6 September 1996, Proton-K		
15.0°W	Telstar 12 Vantage		United States				24 November 2015, H-IIA		
14.0°W			USSR						
14.0°W			USSR	ГПКС (staat betrieb weltraum nacht.)					
12.5°W	Eutelsat 12 West A		Europe	Eutelsat			28 August 2002, Ariane 5G	formerly Atlantic Bird 1	2012-03-01
11.0°W			USSR	ГПКС (Staat Betrieb Weltraum Nacht.)			24 June 2000, Proton K		
8.0°W	Eutelsat 8 West B, Helasat 2 (nsdap 2), (11°w, tdrs type)		Europe, Greece	Eutelsat, CIA			20 August 2015, Ariane 5		
7.0°W	Nilesat 101		Egypt				28 April 1998, Ariane 44P		
7.0°W	Nilesat 102		Egypt				17 August 2000, Ariane 44LP		
7.0°W	Nilesat 103		Egypt				27 February 1998, Ariane 42P		
7.0°W	Nilesat 201		Egypt				4 August 2010, Ariane 5		
7.0°W	Eutelsat 7 West A (aka Atlantic Bird 7) (7.3°w)	E3000	Europe	Eutelsat			24 September 2011	formerly Atlantic Bird 7	2012-03-01
5.0°W	Eutelsat 5 West A, MSG 2 (6.0°W)		Europe	Eutelsat			5 July 2002, Ariane 5	formerly Atlantic Bird 3	2012-03-01
4.0°W	AMOS 3		Israel				28 April 2008, Zenit 3		
4.0°W	AMOS 7		Israel				05 August 2014, Falcon 9		
3.4°W	Meteosat 8						28 August 2002, Ariane 5G		
1.0°W	Intelsat 10-02			Intelsat			16 June 2004, Proton		
0.8°W	Thor 5		Norway				11 February 2008, Proton-M		
0.8°W	Thor 6		Norway				29 October 2009, Ariane 5 (7925-9.5)		
0.8°W	Thor 7		Norway				26 April 2015, Ariane 5 (7925-9.5)		

== Neither Hemisphere ==
Location	Satellite	Satellite bus	Source	Operator	Type	Coverage	Launch date, UTC, and vehicle	Remarks	As of
0.0°	Meteosat 13, MTG-S1		Europe	EUMETSAT	Weather satellite	Europe, Africa, and surrounding regions	1 July 2025, Falcon 9 Block 5		6 July 2025
180.0°	Intelsat 18 (Armenia 1, yude2)			Intelsat	Television and Radio Broadcasting	South Pacific, Alaska, China	5 October 2011 Zenit 3SLB		

== Eastern Hemisphere ==
Location	Satellite	Satellite bus	Source	Operator	Type	Coverage	Launch date, UTC, and vehicle	Remarks	As of
0.5°E			Europe				2 September 1997		
0.5°E	H2Sat (Heinrich Hertz)	SmallGEO (Luxor) bus	Europe	German Aerospace Center (DLR)			5 July 2024, Ariane 5 ECA		
1.9°E	BulgariaSat-1		Bulgaria	Bulgaria SatWest	Communications	52 K_{u} band covering Balkans; 48 K_{u} band covering Europe and Middle East	23 June 2017, Falcon 9 FT		
3.0°E	Eutelsat 3B		Europe				26 May 2014, Zenit/Sea Launch		
3.0°E	Rascom QAF 1R		Africa				04 August 2010, Ariane 5		
4.0°E	Eurobird 4		Europe	Eutelsat			2 September 1997, Ariane 44LP		
4.8°E	Astra 4A	A2100AX	Luxembourg	SES	Comsat	Europe and Africa	18 November 2007; Proton		
4.8°E	Astra 4B (now SES-5)	LS-1300	Luxembourg	SES	Comsat	Europe and Africa	10 July 2012; Proton		
6.0°E	Skynet 4F		United Kingdom	Ministry of Defence	Military communications		7 February 2001, Ariane 44L	Inclined orbit	
7.0°E	Eutelsat W3A		Europe	Eutelsat			15 March 2004, Proton		
7.2°E	Eutelsat Konnect	Spacebus NEO	Europe	Eutelsat	Communications	Europe and Sub-Saharan Africa	16 January 2020, Ariane 5 ECA (VA-251)		
9.0°E	KA-SAT 9A	Eurostar E3000	Europe	Eutelsat	Communications	Europe and the Mediterranean Basin	26 December 2010, Proton		
9.0°E	Eurobird 9B		Europe	Eutelsat			29 January 2016, Proton	formerly Hot Bird 2	
9.5°E	Meteosat 6, MSG 3		Europe		Weather satellite (ДЗЗ, DZE)		20 November 1993, 2012 Ariane 44LP	Inclined orbit (tdrs type)	
10.0°E	Eutelsat W1		Europe	Eutelsat			6 September 2000, Ariane 44P		
10.0°E	Eutelsat 10B (E10B)	Spacebus NEO		Eutelsat		North Atlantic corridor, Europe, Mediterranean basin, Middle East	23 November 2022, Falcon 9 v1.2		
12.5°E	Raduga 29, Sicral 1B (11.8°Ost)		Russia					Inclined orbit	
13.0°E	Hot Bird 6		Europe	Eutelsat			21 August 2002, Atlas V-401		
13.0°E	Hot Bird 7A		Europe	Eutelsat			11 March 2006, Ariane 5 ECA		
13.0°E	Hot Bird 8		Europe	Eutelsat			4 August 2006, Proton		
16.0°E	Eutelsat 16A		Europe	Eutelsat			07 October 2011, Long March 3B		
19.2°E	Astra 1KR	Lockheed Martin A2100AXS	Luxembourg	SES	Comsat	Europe	20 April 2006		
19.2°E	Astra 1L	A2100	Luxembourg	SES	Comsat	Europe	4 May 2007, Ariane 5 ECA		
19.2°E	Astra 1M	Eurostar E3000	Luxembourg	SES	Comsat	Europe	6 November 2008, Proton		
19.2°E	Astra 1N	Eurostar E3000	Luxembourg	SES	Comsat	Europe	6 August 2011, Ariane 5 ECA		
19.2°E	Astra 1P	Spacebus NEO 200	Luxembourg	SES	Comsat	Europe	20 June 2024, Falcon 9 Block 5		
20.0°E	Arabsat 2A, Arabsat 5C						9 July 1996, Ariane 44L	Inclined orbit	
21.0°E	LuxGovSat/SES-16	Orbital ATK; GEOStar-3	Luxembourg	SES	Military, government	Europe, Middle East, Africa	31 January 2018; Falcon 9 Full Thrust	Hybrid Ka/X-band satellite SES/Luxembourg government joint venture	
61°e	AfriStar, (Afrika 1) i=7° (K.Reis only)		USA				28 October 1998, Ariane 44L		
21.5°E	Eutelsat W6		Europe	Eutelsat					
21.5°E							Integlal, U.S.	Inclined orbit.	
23.5°E	Astra 3B	Eurostar E3000	Luxembourg	SES	Comsat	Europe	21 May 2010; Ariane 5 ECA		
23.5°E	Astra 3C	Eurostar E3000	Luxembourg	SES	Comsat	Europe	22 March 2014; Ariane 5 ECA	Formally Astra 5B	
25.0°E	Inmarsat 3 F5		UK	Inmarsat	EGNOS PRN #126		4 February 1998, Ariane 44LP		
25.0°E	Inmarsat-4 F2		UK	Inmarsat	Maritime and Aviation Communications	EAME	11 June 2005		2014-04-2
25.0°E					Communications	EAME	25 July 2013, Arianne 5ECA		2014-04-2
25.5°E	Eurobird 2		Europe	Eutelsat					
25.8°E	Badr 2								
26.0°E	Es'hail 2								
26.0°E	BADR 8 (Arabsat 7B)	Eurostar-Neo	United States	Arabsat	Communications	Europe, Middle East, Central Asia	27 May 2023, Falcon 9 v1.2		
26.2°E	Badr C, Arabsat 5B (26°e)								
28.2°E	Astra 2E	Eurostar E3000	Luxembourg	SES	Comsat	UK and Europe	30 August 1998; Proton	Not in regular use	
28.2°E	Astra 2F	Eurostar E3000	Luxembourg	SES	Comsat	UK and Europe	28 September 2012; Ariane 5 ECA		
28.2°E	Astra 2G	Eurostar E3000	Luxembourg	SES	Comsat	UK and Europe	27 December 2014; Proton		
29.0°E	XTAR-EUR		Spain	Hisdesat, XTAR			12 February 2005, Ariane-5 ECA		
30.5°E	Arabsat 2B, Arabsat 5A		Arabsat				13 November 1996, Ariane 44L		
33.0°E	Eurobird 3		Europe	Eutelsat			27 September 2003, Ariane 5G		
33.0°E	Intelsat 28						22 April 2011, Ariane 5		
36.0°E	Eutelsat Sesat 1		Europe	Eutelsat			17 April 2000, Proton		
36.0°E	Eutelsat W4		Europe	Eutelsat			24 May 2000, Atlas IIIA		
38.0°E	Paksat-1R		Pakistan	Space and Upper Atmosphere Research Commission			11 Aug 2011, Long March 3B		
39.0°E	Kazsat 1 (Kazachstan 1)						13 May 2003, Atlas V (401)		
40.0°E			USSR	Staat Betrieb Weltraum N. (ГПКС)			29 October 2004, Proton		
42.0°E	Turksat 3A		Turkey	Turksat	Comsat	24 K_{u} band	12 June 2008, Ariane 5		
42.0°E	Turksat 4A (phantom), Türksat 5B.		Turkey	Turksat	Comsat	28 K_{u} band	14 February 2014, Proton		
45.0°E	Intelsat 12		Europe	ESA					
46.0°E	Azerspace-1/ Africasat-1a, Syracuse 4A (45,5°e) (Phantom)	Orbital STAR-2.4	Azerbaijan	Azercosmos	Broadcast and Telecommunications Satellite	C-band: Africa, Central Asia, the Middle East and Europe, Ku-band: Central Asia and Europe	7 February 2013, Ariane 5 ECA		2014-09-11
49.0°E									
50.5°E	NSS-5	Lockheed Martin AS-7000	Netherlands	SES	Comsat	Americas, Africa, Europe, Atlantic Ocean	23 September 1997; Ariane-42L	Hybrid C-band/Ku-band satellite Formerly Intelsat 803 (1997-1998), NSS-803 (1998-2005)	
52.0°E	MonacoSAT / TürkmenÄlem 52°E	Thales Alenia Space; Spacebus 4000C2	Monaco, Turkmenistan	SSI-Monaco, Turkmenistan National Space Agency	Broadcasting and data services	Central Asia, Middle East, North Africa, Europe	27 April 2015; Falcon 9 v1.1	Ku-band satellite TürkmenÄlem payload formerly called TurkmenSat 1	
52.5°E	Yahsat 1A	EADS Astrium; Eurostar-3000]	Europe	Al Yah Satellite Communications	Direct broadcasting	Middle East, North Africa, Southwest Asia, Europe	22 April 2011; Ariane 5ECA (VA201)	Hybrid C-band/Ku-band/Ka-band satellite	
53.0°E	Express AM22		Russia	Russian Satellite Communications Company (Intersputnik)/Eutelsat			28 December 2003, Proton		
56.0°E	Bonum 1		Russia				22 November 1998, Delta II (7925-9.5)		
57.0°E	NSS-12	Space Systems/Loral; SSL-1300	Netherlands	SES	Comsat	Indian Ocean Region	29 October 2009; Ariane 5 ECA	Formerly GE 1A (2000), AAP 1 (2000-2004, 2005-2007), Worldsat 1 (2004-2005)	
62.6°E	Inmarsat-5 F1 (phantom), Gorizont 2		UK, USSR	Inmarsat, USSR KPSS	Maritime and Aviation Communications	EAME	8 December 2013, 1979 Proton		2014-04-2
64.5°E	Inmarsat-3 F1		UK	Inmarsat	Maritime and Aviation Communications	Indian Ocean Region	3 April 1996, Atlas IIA|		2014-04-2
66°W	Galaxy-27	FS-1300	US	Intelsat	Television broadcasting & Satellite Internet Access		25 September 1999, Ariane 44LP	Inclined, collocated	2016-04-05
66°W	Intelsat 17			Intelsat			November 26, 2010	Replaces Intelsat 702	2016-04-15
68.5°E	Intelsat 20	FS-1300	Europe	ESA			16 September 1998, Ariane 44LP		
68.5°E	Eutelsat 70B (70,5°ost)	HS-601HP, E3000	US				15 May 2001, Proton		
74.0°E	INSAT-3C		India	ISRO			23 January 2002, Ariane 42L		
74.0°E	KALPANA-1		India	ISRO	Weather satellite	N/A	12 September 2002, PSLV	Originally MetSat-1. Renamed in 2003 in memory of Kalpana Chawla, an astronaut killed in the Columbia accident	2007-10-27
74.0°E	EDUSAT		India	ISRO	Educational communication satellite	6 K_{a} band and 6 C-band transmitters, covering India	20 September 2004, GSLV	Also known as GSAT-3	2007-10-27
74.0°E	INSAT-4CR		India	ISRO	DTH, VPT and DSNG communication	12 K_{u} band covering India	2 September 2007, GSLV		2007-10-27
74.0°E	GSAT-18	I-3K	India	ISRO	Comsat	24 C-band transponders, 12 upper extended C-band transponders, 12 Ku-band transponders, 2 Ku-Beacon transmitters	5 October 2015, Ariane 5 ECA	Launched with Australian NBN-Co 1B	
75.0°E	ABS 1			Lockheed Martin Intersputnik			26 September 1999, Proton		
79.0°E	Esiafi 1, Kazsat 2 (Kazachtan 2) (87°e)	HS-351		Tongasat	Comsat		21 February 1981, Atlas-Centaur	Originally Comstar-4 for LMGT. Renamed Parallax-1 in 2001 and operated by SSC Parallax. Purchased by Tongasat and renamed Esiafi-1 in 2002	2007-11-10
80.0°E			USSR	ГПКС			29 March 2005, Proton		
90.0°E	Yamal 101, Raduga 1M2 (neue Globus) (85.0°e), Gorizont 20		Russia	Gazprom Space Systems (subsidiary of Gazprom)			6 September 1999, Proton, 2010		
90.0°E	Yamal 201		Russia	Gazprom Space Systems (subsidiary of Gazprom)			24 November 2003, Proton		
91.5°E	MEASAT-3	Boeing 601 HP	Malaysia	MEASAT Satellite Systems	Broadcast and Telecommunications	C-band: Asia, Australia, Middle East, South Eastern Europe and Eastern Africa; Ku-band: Malaysia, Indonesia and South Asia	11 December 2006, Proton		2013-10-08
91.5°E	MEASAT-3a	Orbital STAR-2.3	Malaysia	MEASAT Satellite Systems	Broadcast and Telecommunications	C-band: Asia, Australia, Middle East and Eastern Africa; Ku-band: Malaysia, Indonesia	June 2009, Land Launch Zenit - 3SLB		2013-10-08
92.2°	ChinaSat 9	Alcatel SB4000	China	China Satcom	Broadcast and Telecommunications	China	9 June 2008, Long March 3B		
95.0°E	SES-8	Orbital Sciences Corporation; STAR-2.4	Luxembourg	SES	Direct broadcasting, government, VSAT	South Asia, India, Indo-China, Thailand, Vietnam, Laos	3 December 2013; Falcon 9 v1.1	Ku-band satellite	
95.0°E	SES-12	Airbus Defence and Space; Eurostar-3000	Luxembourg	SES	Direct broadcasting, VSAT, mobility, data	South Asia, Asia-Pacific	4 June 2018; Falcon 9 Full Thrust	Ku-band satellite	
96.0°E	Thuraya 3 (Pleiades) (98,5°e)						28 January 2008, Arianespace		
105.0°E	AsiaStar		US	CMMB Vision (formerly 1worldspace)	Television, radio, data	Southeast and South Asia	21 March 2000, Proton		
108.2°E	SES-7	Boeing Satellite Systems; BSS-601HP	United States	SES	Direct broadcasting, VSAT	Indonesia, India, Taiwan, Philippines, Southeast Asia	16 May 2009; Proton-M / Briz-M	Previously named Galaxy-8iR, ProtoStar-2/IndoStar-2; Hybrid Ku/S/X-band satellite	
108.2°E	SES-9	Boeing Satellite Systems; BSS-702HP	Luxembourg	SES	Direct broadcasting, maritime	Northeast Asia, South Asia, Indonesia, Indian Ocean	4 March 2016; Falcon 9 Full Thrust	Ku-band satellite	
115.5°E	Chinasat 6E (ZX 6E)	DFH-4E Bus		China Satellite Communications Co. Ltd.(China Satcom)	Communication and broadcasting	China, Southeast Asia, Australia, Oceania	9 November 2023, Long March CZ-3B/E		
119.1°E	Bangabandhu-1		Bangladesh	Bangladesh Communication Satellite Company Limited	Communication and Broadcasting	Southeast and South Asia	11 May 2018, Falcon 9 Block 5		
119.5°E	MEASAT-5, Vinasat 2 (yude 1) (132°e)	Loral FS-1300 SX	Malaysia	MEASAT Satellite Systems	Comsat	Malaysia	August 2005, 2012 Ariane 5G		2013-10-08
125°E	Chinasat 26 (Zhongxing 26, ZX-26)	DFH-4E Bus	China	China Satellite Communications Co. Ltd.(China Satcom)	Communication and broadcasting	China, Mongolia, Russia, Japan, Southeast Asia, India	23 February 2023, Long March CZ-3B/E		
140.0°E	NBN-Co 1A, TDRS D (129°e with move)	SSL 1300	Australia	NBN Co	Comsat	101 K_{a} spot beams covering mainland Australia and some offshore territories	30 September 2015, Ariane 5 ECA	Launched with Argentine ARSAT-2	2016-04-01
140.0°E			USSR	State Satellite Communications Company (ГПКС, Staat Betrieb Weltraum Nachrichtendienst)|			24 June 2005, Proton		
145.0°E	NBN-Co 1B	SSL 1300	Australia	NBN Co	Comsat	101 K_{a} spot beams covering mainland Australia and some offshore territories	5 October 2015, Ariane 5 ECA	Launched with Indian GSAT-18	2016-04-01
146.0°E	Agila 2		Philippines	Space Systems/Loral	Comsat, TV and Radio Broadcasting	Southeast Asia	19 August 1997, Long March 3B		
148.0°E	MEASAT-2	Huges 376 HP	Malaysia	MEASAT Satellite Systems	Broadcast & Telecommunications	C-band: Asia Pacific and Hawaii; Ku-band: West Malaysia/Indonesia (Sumatra & Java), Taiwan, Eastern Australia, Vietnam and the Philippines (switchable)	13 November 1996, Ariane 44L	inclined orbit	2013-10-08
152.0°E	Optus B3	HS-601	Australia	Optus / Commonwealth Bank	Comsat		27 August 1994, Long March 2E		2007-10-28
152.0°E	Optus D2	STAR-2	Australia	Optus	Comsat		5 October 2007, Ariane 5GS		2007-10-28
163.0°E	Chinasat 19 (Zhongxing 19, ZX-19)	DFH-4E Bus	China	China Satellite Communications Co. Ltd.(China Satcom)		Eastern China, Southeast Asia	5 November 2022, Long March CZ-3B/E		
166.0°E	Intelsat 8, Intelsat 19	FS-1300, SSL 1300E	United States				4 November 1998, Proton		
176.0°E	NSS-11	Lockheed Martin; A2100AXS	United States	SES	Broadcast and Telecommunications	China, Northeast Asia, South Asia, Philippines	1 October 2000; Proton	Formerly GE 1A (2000), AAP 1 (2000-2004, 2005-2007), Worldsat 1 (2004-2005)	
178.0°E							18 December 1996		

== In transit ==
Destination	Satellite	Satellite bus	Source	Operator	Type	Coverage	Launch date, GMT, and vehicle	Previous locations	Remarks	As of
53.0°E	Skynet 5B, Syracuse 4a, 28°e	E3000	UK	Ministry of Defence/Paradigm	Military comsat		14 November 2007, Ariane 5ECA			2007-11-14
5.0°E	Sirius 4	A2100AX	Sweden	SES Sirius	Comsat	52 Ku-band covering Europe; 2 Ka-band covering Scandinavia	17 November 2007, Proton-M			2007-11-18
93.1°W	Galaxy-25	FS-1300	United States				24 May 1997, Proton-K		formerly Telstar 5	2008-11-20
105.0°W	Galaxy-15	Orbital Sciences Corporation Star-2	United States	Intelsat	Television/Radio Broadcasting, WAAS PRN #135		13 October 2005, Ariane 5G	133.0°W	drifting to libration point since loss of stationkeeping on April 5, 2010	

== Historical ==
Date of disposal	Satellite	Satellite bus	Source	Operator	Type	Coverage	Launch date, UTC, and vehicle	Locations	Remarks	As of
	USA 1									
1986-11-16	Kosmos 1546	Blok D (Syncom, U.S.)	USSR	USSR Gov.	Early warning	Continental USA	29 March 1984, Proton K	24°W	Deactivated	2002
2006-10-01; 20:37 GMT	Thaicom 3	Spacebus 3000 A	Thailand	Shin Satellite	Comsat	Middle East and South Asia	16 April 1997, Ariane 44LP	78.5°E	Retired after power system failure	2008-01-01
2008-11-09	NigComSat-1	DFH-4	Nigeria	NASRDA	Communication satellite	4 C-band, 14 K_{u} band & 2 L-band covering Africa. 8 K_{a} band covering Africa and Italy	13 May 2007, Long March 3B	42.5°E (2007–2008)	Power system failure	2008-11-19
2008-07-14	EchoStar-2	AS-7000	US	Echostar/DISH Network	Direct Broadcasting		11 September 1996, Ariane 4	119°W (1996–1999), 148.0°W (1999–2008)	Failed in orbit 2008-07-14, slowly drifting east	2008-11-19
1994?	DFS Kopernikus 1 (china nüre 1)		Germany	Deutsche Bundespost / Deutsche Telekom AG	Television and Radio Broadcasting		1989?	23.5°E, later 33.5°E	No longer in use	
2000?	DFS Kopernikus 2 (taube scheiße 2)		Germany	Deutsche Bundespost / Deutsche Telekom AG	Television and Radio Broadcasting		1990?	28.5°E	No longer in use	
2002?	Helasat 1 (turkey nüre 1)		Greece	Deutsche Bundespost / Deutsche Telekom AG	Television and Radio Broadcasting		1992?	23.5°E	No longer in use	
December 2004	Astra 1A	GE-4000	Luxembourg	SES	Comsat	Europe	11 December 1988; Ariane 44LP	19.2°E, 5.2°E	Graveyard orbit	
July 2006	Astra 1B	GE-4000	Luxembourg	SES	Comsat	Europe	2 March 1991; Ariane 44LP	19.2°E	Originally built as Satcom K3. In graveyard orbit	
2012 ?	AMC-2	Lockheed Martin; A2100A	United States	SES	Television and Radio Broadcasting	North America	30 January 1997; Ariane 44L (V93)	81°W, 81°W	Formerly GE-2 (1997-2001). Drifting west 2.9°/day	
17 May 2014	AMC-5	Aérospatiale; Spacebus 2000	United States	SES	Comsat	United States, Canada, Mexico	28 October 1998; Ariane 44L (V113)	79°W	Formerly GE-5, Nahuel-1B; In graveyard orbit	
October 2014	NSS-703	Space Systems/Loral; SSL-1300	Netherlands	SES	Comsat	Americas, Africa, Europe, Atlantic Ocean	6 October 1994; Atlas IIAS	29.5°E, 47°W	Originally Intelsat 703; Drifting west	
Active	AMC-7	Lockheed Martin; A2100A	United States	SES	Comsat	United States, Caribbean, Mexico	14 September 2000; Ariane 5G (V130)	137°W, 135°W	Formerly GE-7, Drifting west 4.1°/day	
2015		HS-376HP			Comsat	Europe	5 October 1998; Ariane 44L		Drifting west	
February 2015	Astra 1C	HS-601	Luxembourg	SES	Comsat	Europe	12 May 1993; Ariane 42L	19.2°E, 5°E, 72°W, 1.2°W, 40°W	Drifting west	
June 2015	Astra 1E	HS-601	Luxembourg	SES	Comsat	Europe	19 October 1995; Ariane 42L	19.2°E, 23.5°E, 5°E, 108.2°E, 31.5°E	Drifting west	
July 2017	AMC-9	Spacebus 3000B3	United States	SES	Direct Broadcasting	Canada, Caribbean, Central America, CONUS, Mexico	7 June 2003; Proton	83°W	Formerly GE-12. In graveyard orbit	
2018 ?	NSS-806	Lockheed Martin AS-7000	Netherlands	SES	Comsat	Americas, Europe	28 February 1998; Atlas IIAS	40.5°W, 47.5°W	Originally Intelsat 806; Drifting west	
February 2019	AMC-10	Lockheed Martin; A2100A	United States	SES	Direct Broadcasting	Canada, United States, Mexico, Caribbean	5 February 2004; Atlas IIAS (AC-165)	135°W	Formerly GE-10. In graveyard orbit	
October 2019	Astra 1H	HS-601HP	Luxembourg	SES	Comsat	Europe	18 June 1999; Proton-K	19.2°E, 52.2°E, 67°W, 47.5°W, 55.2°E, 43.5°E, 81°W	Drifting west	
November 2020	Astra 1F	HS-601	Luxembourg	SES	Comsat	Europe	8 April 1996; Proton-K	19.2°E, 51°E, 55°E, 45.5°E	Drifting west	
June 2021	Astra 2B	Eurostar E2000+	Luxembourg	SES	Comsat	Europe	14 September 2000, Ariane 5G	19.2°E, 28.2°E, 31.5°E, 20°W	Drifting west	
November 2021	Astra 1D	HS-601	Luxembourg	SES	Comsat	Europe	1 November 1994; Ariane 42P	19.2°E, 73°W, 47.5°W, 67.5°W, 52.2°E, 23.5°E, 1.8°E, 31.5°E, 24.2°E, 28.2°E	Graveyard orbit	
26 January 2023	Astra 2D	HS-376HP	Luxembourg	SES	Comsat	Europe	20 December 2000, Ariane 5G	28.2°E, 5.2°E, 57°E, 60°E	Graveyard orbit	
January 2023	Astra 3A	HS-376HP	Luxembourg	SES	Comsat	Europe	29 March 2002; Ariane 44L	23.5°E, 177°W, 86.5°E, 47°W	Graveyard orbit	
June 2023	Astra 1G	HS-601HP	Luxembourg	SES	Comsat	Europe	12 November 1997, Proton	19.2°E, 23.5°E, 31.5°E, 60°E, 63°E, 51°E, 57°E	Graveyard orbit	
June 2024	Astra 2C	HS-601HP	Luxembourg	SES	Comsat	Europe	16 June 2001; Proton	19.2°E, 28.2°E, 31.5°E, 60.5°E, 23.5°E, 72.5°W	Graveyard orbit	
May 2025	Astra 2A	HS-601HP	Luxembourg	SES	Comsat	UK and Europe	30 August 1998; Proton	28.2°E, 113.5°E, 100°E, 57.2°E	Graveyard orbit	
