= List of SES satellites =

This is a list of satellites operated by SES.
Orbital data for the geostationary satellites can be accessed here

== AMC fleet ==
The AMC fleet was originally operated by GE Americom, acquired by SES Global in 2001. Americom was also operating the older Satcom fleet, whose last operating spacecraft were fully retired in the early 2000s.

Legend
Active fleet
Future launches
Retired or lost

Satellite	Location	Manufacturer	Model	Coverage	Launch date	Launch vehicle	Comments
AMC-4	135° W	Lockheed Martin	A2100AX	24 C-band, 20 watts (USA, Canada, Mexico, Caribbean, Central America); 24+4 K_{u}-band, 110 watts (USA, Canada, Mexico, Caribbean, Central America, South America)	13 November 1999	Ariane 44LP	On 5 August 2022, replaced by the SES 22 satellite.
AMC-6	139° W	Lockheed Martin	A2100AX	24 C-band, 20 watts (CONUS, Canada, Mexico, Caribbean, Central America); 24+4 K_{u}-band, 110 watts (CONUS, Canada, Mexico, Caribbean, Central America)	22 October 2000	Proton-K/DM-2	
AMC-8	135° W	Lockheed Martin	A2100A	24 C-band, 20 watts (USA, Canada, Mexico, Caribbean)	19 December 2000	Ariane 5G	On 5 August 2022, AMC 8 ends its life cycle and was replaced by the SES 22 satellite.
AMC-11	131° W	Lockheed Martin	A2100A	24 C-band, 20 watts (USA, Canada, Mexico, Caribbean)	19 May 2004	Atlas 2AS	On 1 December 2022, AMC 11 ends its life cycle and was replaced by the SES 21 satellite.
AMC-15	105° W	Lockheed Martin	A2100AX	24 K_{u}-band, (USA, Canada, Mexico, Caribbean); 12 K_{a}-band, (USA, Canada, Mexico, Caribbean)	15 October 2004	Proton-M/Briz-M	
AMC-16	85° W	Lockheed Martin	A2100AX	24 K_{u}-band, (USA, Canada, Mexico, Caribbean); 12 K_{a}-band, (USA, Canada, Mexico, Caribbean)	17 December 2004	Atlas V (521)	
AMC-18	83° W	Lockheed Martin	A2100A	24 C-band, 20 watts (USA, Canada, Mexico, Caribbean)	8 December 2006	Ariane 5 ECA	Replaced AMC-2 previously at 105° W.
AMC-21	125° W	Thales Alenia Space/ Orbital Sciences	STAR-2	24 K_{u}-band, 110 watts (USA, Southern Canada, Mexico, Caribbean)	14 August 2008	Ariane 5 ECA	
AMC-1	131° W	Lockheed Martin	A2100A	24 C-band, 12–14 watts (USA, Mexico, Caribbean, Canada); 24 K_{u}-band, 60watts (USA, Southern Canada, Northern Mexico)	8 September 1996	Atlas 2A	
AMC-2	drifting	Lockheed Martin	A2100A	24 C-band, 12–18 watts (USA, Mexico, Canada); 24 K_{u}-band, 60 watts (CONUS, Northern Mexico, Canada)	30 January 1997	Ariane 4L	was co-located with AMC-4
AMC-3	87° W	Lockheed Martin	A2100A	24 C-band, 12–18 watts (USA, Mexico, Canada, Caribbean); 24 K_{u}-band, 60 watts (USA, Mexico, Canada, Caribbean)	4 September 1997	Atlas 2AS	
AMC-5	drifting	Alcatel Space	Spacebus 2000	16 K_{u}-band, 55 watts (CONUS, South Canada, Northern Mexico)	28 October 1998	Ariane 4L	Retired in May 2014.
AMC-7	drifting	Lockheed Martin	A2100A	24 C-band, 20 watts (USA, Canada, Mexico, Caribbean)	14 September 2000	Ariane 5G	Backup to AMC-10
AMC-9	drifting	Alcatel Space	Spacebus 3000B3	24 C-band, 20 watts, (CONUS, Canada, Mexico, Caribbean, Central America); 24 K_{u}-band, 110 watts (CONUS, Mexico)	7 June 2003	Proton-K/Briz-M	Anomaly on-orbit, satellite lost control and appeared to be breaking apart.
AMC-10	drifting	Lockheed Martin	A2100A	24 C-band, 20 watts (USA, Canada, Mexico, Caribbean)	5 February 2004	Atlas 2AS	
AMC-14	61.5° W	Lockheed Martin	A2100	32 K_{u}-band, 150 watts	14 March 2008	Proton-M/Briz-M	Wrong orbit

== Astra fleet ==
There are 10 fully-operational Astra satellites and another 3 as backup/reserve, the majority in four orbital locations - Astra 19.2°E, Astra 28.2°E, Astra 23.5°E, Astra 5°E. Astra's principle of "co-location" (several satellites are maintained close to each other, all within a cube with a size of 150 km (93 mi).) increases flexibility and redundancy. Orbital data for the active satellites can be accessed here

Satellite	Launch Date	Manufacturer	Model	Launch vehicle	Comments
Astra 19.2°E					147 transponders broadcasting to 118.4 million households
1N	6 August 2011	Astrium (now Airbus D&S)	Eurostar E3000	Ariane 5 ECA	Started commercial service 24 October 2011. Broadcast 30 transponders.
1P	20 June 2024	Thales Alenia Space	Spacebus NEO 200	Falcon 9 Block 5	Started commercial service 13 January 2025. Broadcast 59 transponders.
1Q	2027	Thales Alenia Space	Spacebus NEO 200	Falcon 9 Block 5	Planned
Astra 28.2°E					305 transponders broadcasting to 419 million households
2E	30 September 2013	Astrium (now Airbus D&S)	Eurostar E3000	Proton Breeze M	Started commercial service on 1 February 2014. Broadcast 15 transponders on UK spot beam and 8 transponders on European beam.
2F	28 September 2012	Astrium (now Airbus D&S)	Eurostar E3000	Ariane 5 ECA	Rolling capacity replacement at 28.2°E. and provision of Ku-band DTH in West Africa and Ka-band in Western Europe Started commercial service on 21 November 2012. Broadcast 6 transponders on UK spot beam, 8 transponders on European beam and 9 transponders on West Africa spot beam.
2G	27 December 2014	Airbus D&S	Eurostar E3000	Proton Breeze M	Rolling capacity replacement at 28.2°E. Tested at 21.0°E and 43.5°E before moving to 28.2°E in June 2015. Started commercial service on 1 June 2015. Broadcast 1 transponder on UK spot beam, 20 transponders on European beam and 2 transponder on West Africa spot beam.
Astra 23.5°E					64 transponders broadcasting to 415 million households
3B	21 May 2010	Astrium (now Airbus D&S)	Eurostar E3000	Ariane 5 ECA	Launch delayed for nearly two months due to launcher problems. Broadcast 28 transponders.
3C (was 5B)	22 March 2014	Airbus D&S	Eurostar E3000	Ariane 5 ECA	Launched as Astra 5B to add new capacity and replace existing craft at 31.5°E. Entered commercial service on 2 June 2014. In July 2023, moved to 23.5° East and renamed Astra 3C. Broadcast 3 transponders.
Astra 5°E					121 transponders broadcasting to 51.5 million households
4A	18 November 2007	Lockheed Martin	A2100AX	Proton-M	Originally called Sirius 4.
4B (now SES-5)	10 July 2012	Space Systems/Loral	LS-1300	Proton-M	Originally Sirius 5, renamed to Astra 4B in 2010 and to SES-5 in 2011. Provides global C-band capacity and Ku-band for Sub-Saharan Africa and Nordic regions.
Not in regular use
1KR	20 April 2006	Lockheed Martin	A2100	Atlas V (411)	Positioned at 19.2°E. Launched to 19.2°E as replacement for the failed Astra 1K. All channels vacated to Astra 1P by March 2025
1L	4 May 2007	Lockheed Martin	A2100	Ariane 5 ECA	Positioned at 19.4°E. Launched to 19.2°E as replacement for Astra 1E/Astra 2C. Moved to 19.4°E in March 2025 after all channels vacated to Astra 1P
1M	6 November 2008	Astrium (now Airbus D&S)	Eurostar E3000	Proton-M	Started commercial service 20 January 2009. Emptied after the arrival of Astra 1P in June 2025.
No longer operational
1A	11 December 1988	GE AstroSpace	GE-4000	Ariane 44LP	The first Astra satellite. Now retired in graveyard orbit.
1B	2 March 1991	GE AstroSpace	GE-5000	Ariane 44LP	Acquired from GE Americom (Satcom K3). Now retired in graveyard orbit.
1C	12 May 1993	Hughes	HS-601	Ariane 42L	Originally launched to 19.2°E. Used at 5°E. Unused and in inclined orbit at 72°W in summer 2014, 1.2°W in September 2014, 40°W in November 2014. From February 2015, continuously moving West at approx. 5.2°/day.
1D	1 November 1994	Hughes	HS-601	Ariane 42P	Originally at 19.2°E. Used at 28.2°E, 23.5°E, 31.5°E, 1.8°E and 52.2°E. Started moving west in February 2014 to arrive at 67.5°W in June 2014. In summer 2015 moved to 47.2°W, near NSS-806. In 2017, moved to 73°W. From November 2021, continuously moving West at approx 4.8°/day.
1E	19 October 1995	Hughes	HS-601	Ariane 42L	Originally at 19.2°E. Used at 23.5°E pending launch of Astra 3B. Used at 5°E in September 2010, pending launch of Astra 4B/SES-4, then moved April 2012 to 108.2°E where, as of November 2013, in inclined orbit. Moved in February 2014 to 31.5°E pending launch of Astra 5B. Returned to 23.5°E in February 2015. From June 2015, continuously moving West at approx 5.4°/day.
1F	8 April 1996	Hughes	HS-601	Proton-K	Originally launched to 19.2°E. Moved in August 2009 to 51°E. Moved in May 2010 to 55°E. Moved in March 2015 to 44.5°E. From November 2020, continuously moving west at approx. 4.2°/day.
1G	2 December 1997	Hughes	HS-601HP	Proton-K	Originally launched to 19.2°E. Moved to 23.5°E in February 2009 following launch of Astra 1M. Then to 31.5°E in July 2010, following launch of Astra 3B. Moved east in summer 2014 to 60°E, then to 63°E in November 2016, to 51°E in August 2017, to 57°E in August 2018. and back to 63°E in August 2019. Moved back to 19.2°E in February 2021. Retired to graveyard orbit in June 2023.
1H	18 June 1999	Hughes	HS-601HP	Proton	Originally launched to 19.2°E. Moved in June 2013 to 52.2°E, to establish SES' commercialisation of the MonacoSat position. Returned in 2014 to 19.2°E. Started moving west in May 2014 arriving at 67.5°W in mid-August 2014. Moved in May 2015 to 47.5°W, in September 2016 to 55.2° E, in January 2017 to 43.5° E, in February 2018 to 67°W and in October 2018 to 81°W. In January 2019, Astra 1H was returned to 67°W. From October 2019, continuously moving West at approx. 4.8°/day.
1K	26 November 2002	Alcatel Space	Spacebus 3000B3S	Proton	Launched to 19.2°E but failed to reach geostationary orbit, and intentionally deorbited on 10 December 2002.
2A	30 August 1998	Hughes	HS-601HP	Proton	Originally launched to 28.2°E. Inactive at 28.2°E from March 2015. Moved to 113.5°E in summer 2016. and to 100°E in August 2018. In May 2020, Astra 2A started moving west at approx 0.8°/day. In autumn 2020, it was positioned back at 28.2°E. Moved to 57.2°E in 2022 From May 2025, continuously moving west at approx. 5.8°/day.
2B	14 September 2000	Astrium (now Airbus D&S)	Eurostar E2000+	Ariane 5G	Originally launched to 28.2°E. Relocated to 19.2°E in February 2013, following launch of Astra 2F to 28.2°E. Moved to 31.5°E in February 2014. Returned to 19.2°E as backup in December 2016. Started moving west in June 2017 to arrive alongside NSS-7 at 20°W in August 2017. Started moving East in April 2018 to arrive at Astra 19.2°E in July 2018. From June 2021, continuously moving west at approx. 4.9°/day.
2C	16 June 2001	Hughes	HS-601HP	Proton	Initially deployed at 19.2°E pending launch of Astra 1L, then at originally intended position of 28.2°E. Moved to 31.5°E in May 2009) to temporarily replace the failed Astra 5A, then back to 19.2°E in September 2010. Returned to 28.2°E in April 2014 and then in August 2015 moved to 60.5°E. In April 2018, it moved west arriving at 23.5°E in May 2018. Moved to 72.5°W in 2021. From June 2024, moving west at approx. 4.5°/day.
2D	19 December 2000	Hughes	HS-376HP	Ariane 5G	Originally launched to 28.2°E. Ceased regular use in February 2013 and positioned, inactive, at 28.0°E until June 2015. Then moved West to be stationed at Astra 5°E in July 2015. In October 2015, moved to 57°E. In December 2017, moved to 60°E. Started moving west at 0.65°/day in May 2018 to arrive at Astra 5°E in July 2018. Started moving East at 0.9°/day in January 2020 to arrive at 57.2°E in March 2020. Started moving West in August 2021 to arrive at 23.5°E in November 2021. The satellite was retired on 26 January 2023.
3A	29 March 2002	Boeing	HS-376HP	Ariane 4L	Originally launched to 23.5°E. Moved to 177°W in November 2013, unused and in inclined orbit alongside NSS-9. Then continuously moving East at approximately 1.5°/day, until positioned at 86.5°W in summer 2016. In November 2016, started moving East at approx 0.5°/day until positioned at 47°W in mid-February 2017. In October 2019, Astra 3A started moving West at approx 0.8°/day until returned to 86.5°W in December 2019. Retired to graveyard orbit in January 2023
5A	12 November 1997	Alcatel Space	Spacebus 3000B2	Ariane 44L	Formerly known as Sirius 2. Moved to 31.5°E and renamed Astra 5A on 29 April 2008. Failed in-orbit on 16 January 2009.

== NSS fleet ==
This fleet came from the acquisition of New Skies Satellites in 2005, which itself had inherited 5 satellites from Intelsat in 1998.

Legend
Active fleet
Future launches
Retired or lost

Satellite	Location	Manufacturer	Model	Coverage	Launch date	Launch vehicle	Comments
NSS-6	169.5° W	Lockheed Martin	A2100AX	50 K_{u}-band transponders to cover Asia, Australia, Africa, Middle East and 12 K_{a}-band super high gain uplink beams DTH services to Asia, especially India.	17 December 2002	Ariane 4L	
NSS-7	20° W	Lockheed Martin	A2100AX	36 C-Band and 36 K_{u}-band transponders Video broadcast covering South America and Africa	16 April 2002	Ariane 4L	Originally at 22°W
NSS-9	177° W	Orbital Sciences	STAR-2.	44 C-band transponders Pacific Ocean: transcontinental video, voice and Internet; local service to Pacific islands	12 February 2009	Ariane 5 flight V187	
NSS-10	37.5° W	Thales Alenia Space	Spacebus 4000C3	49 C-band transponders Americas, Europe and Africa; telecom and VSAT operators.	3 February 2005	Proton-M/Briz-M	Formerly known as AMC-12/Astra 4A
NSS-11	176° E	Lockheed Martin	A2100AX	28 K_{u}-band transponders DTH voice, video and data in India, China and Philippines.	1 October 2000	Proton-K/DM-2M	Formerly known as AAP-1, GE 1A or WorldSat-1
NSS-12	57° E	Space Systems/Loral	FS-1300	40 C-band and 48 K_{u}-band active high-power transponders Mobile backhaul services over the Middle East and Europe, Central and South Asia and East Africa.	29 October 2009	Ariane 5 ECA	
NSS-5	50.5° E	Lockheed Martin	AS-7000	38 C-band, 12 K_{u}-band; Pacific Ocean region, shared capacity with Intelsat.	23 September 1997	Ariane 42L	Formerly known as NSS-803, launched as Intelsat 803. Moved from 183° E to 57° E to cover NSS-703's service area until NSS-12 launched on 29 October 2009. Moved to 22° W and then 20° W as part of a swapout plan with NSS-7 and SES-4 that was to be completed by June 2012. Finally moved to 50.5° E in September 2012.
NSS-513	177° W	Ford Aerospace			18 May 1988	Ariane 2	Launched as Intelsat 513. Retired
NSS-703	47° W	Space Systems/Loral	LS-1300	Originally at 57° E.	6 October 1994	Atlas 2AS	Traffic moved to NSS-12 in January 2010, satellite retired in October 2014.
NSS-806	47° W	Lockheed Martin	AS-7000	28 C-band and 3 K_{u}-band transponders to cover Latin America, Iberian peninsula, Canary Islands, Western Europe and much of Eastern Europe.	27 February 1998	Atlas 2AS	Launched as Intelsat 806 at 40.5° W. Replaced by SES-6 in June 2013 and moved to 47° W European beams retired, remaining C-band Hemi beam and K_{u}-band Spot beam cover South America only
NSS-K	183° E	Lockheed Martin	AS-5000	Originally at 21.5° W.	9 June 1992	Atlas 2A	Retired
NSS-8	57° E (planned)	Boeing	BSS-702		30 January 2007	Zenit-3SL	Rocket exploded on pad.

== SES fleet ==
Legend
Active fleet
Future launches

Satellite	Location	Manufacturer	Model	Coverage	Launch date	Launch vehicle	Comments
SES-1	101° W	Orbital Sciences Corporation	STAR-2	24 C-band, (USA, Mexico, Caribbean, Canada, Central America); 24 K_{u}-band, (USA, Southern Canada, Northern Mexico)	24 April 2010	Proton-M / Briz-M	Replaced AMC-2, AMC-4 previously at 101° W.
SES-2	87° W	Orbital Sciences Corporation	STAR-2	24 C-band, (USA, Mexico, Caribbean, Canada, Central America); 24 K_{u}-band, (USA, Southern Canada, Northern Mexico)	21 September 2011	Ariane 5 ECA	Replaced AMC-3 previously at 87° W.
SES-3	103° W	Orbital Sciences Corporation	STAR-2	24 C-band, (USA, Mexico, Caribbean, Canada, Central America); 24 K_{u}-band, (USA, Southern Canada, Northern Mexico)	15 July 2011	Proton-M / Briz-M	Entering commercial service in March 2012.
SES-4	22° W	Space Systems/Loral	LS-1300	52 C-band, 72 K_{u}-band	14 February 2012	Proton-M / Briz-M	Entering commercial service in April 2012. Formerly known as NSS-14.
SES-5	5° E	Space Systems/Loral	LS-1300	24 C-band, 36 K_{u}-band, Europe, Africa and the Middle East. Two K_{u}-band beams targeting Nordic/Baltic regions, and sub-Saharan Africa.	10 July 2012	Proton-M / Briz-M	Entering commercial service summer 2012. Formerly called Astra 4B.
SES-6	40.5° W	Astrium	Eurostar E3000	43 C-band, 48 K_{u}-band. (North America, Latin America, Europe, Atlantic Ocean)	3 June 2013	Proton-M / Briz-M	Replaced NSS-806
SES-7	108.2° E	Boeing Satellite Systems	Boeing 601HP	22 K_{u}-band, 10 S-band. (South Asia, Asia Pacific)	16 May 2009	Proton-M / Briz-M	Formerly known as IndoStar 2 / ProtoStar 2.
SES-8	95° E	Orbital Sciences Corporation	STAR-2	Up to 33 K_{u}-band. (South Asia, Asia Pacific)	3 December 2013	Falcon 9 v1.1	First Falcon 9 launch to a geostationary orbit.
SES-9	108.2° E	Boeing Satellite Systems	Boeing 702HP	81 K_{u}-band. (South Asia, Asia Pacific) from position 108.2° E	4 March 2016	Falcon 9 Full Thrust	Second launch of Falcon 9 Full Thrust. Co-located with the SES-7 satellite.
SES-10	67° W	Airbus Defence and Space	Eurostar E3000	60 K_{u}-band (Latin America)	30 March 2017	Falcon 9 Full Thrust	
SES-11 / EchoStar 105	105° W	Airbus Defence and Space	Eurostar E3000	24 K_{u}-band, 24 C-band (North America, Latin America and the Caribbean)	11 October 2017	Falcon 9 Full Thrust	Replaced AMC-15 and AMC-18
SES-12	95° E	Airbus Defence and Space	Eurostar E3000	54 K_{u}-band (South Asia, Asia-Pacific)	4 June 2018	Falcon 9 Full Thrust	Replaced NSS-6; co-located with SES-8
SES-14	47.5° W	Airbus Defence and Space	Eurostar E3000	20 K_{u}-band HTS, 28 C-band (Americas and North Atlantic)	25 January 2018	Ariane 5 ECA	Will replace NSS-806 and add capacity. Hosts NASA's Global-Scale Observations of the Limb and Disk (GOLD) instrument payload.
SES-15	129° W	Boeing Satellite Systems	Boeing 702SP	16 K_{u}-band (North America, Latin America, Caribbean)	18 May 2017	Soyuz-STA / Fregat-M	Combines wide beams and HTS multi-spot beams
SES-16 / GovSat-1	21.5° E	Orbital ATK	GEOStar-3	Military X-band and K_{a}-band	31 January 2018	Falcon 9 Full Thrust	Communications services for the government of Luxembourg
SES-17	67.1° W	Thales Alenia Space	Spacebus Neo	High Throughput K_{a}-band	24 October 2021	Ariane 5 ECA	Connectivity services over the Americas optimized for commercial aviation. In position and fully operational June 2022.
SES-18	103° W	Northrop Grumman	GEOStar 3	C-band	17 March 2023	Falcon 9 Block 5	Entered service in June 2023, replacing SES-3.
SES-19	135° W	Northrop Grumman	GEOStar 3	C-band	17 March 2023	Falcon 9 Block 5	
SES-20	103° W	Boeing	Boeing 702SP	C-band	4 October 2022	Atlas V 531	
SES-21	131° W	Boeing	Boeing 702SP	C-band	4 October 2022	Atlas V 531	On 1 December 2022, it began operations and replaced the AMC 11 satellite.
SES-22	135° W	Thales Alenia Space	Spacebus 4000B2	C-band	29 June 2022	Falcon 9 Block 5	On 5 August 2022, it began operations and replaced the AMC 8 satellite.
SES-23		Thales Alenia Space	Spacebus-4000B2	C-band	Unknown	TBA	
SES-24	19.2° E	Thales Alenia Space	Spacebus-NEO 200	Ku-band	20 June 2024	Falcon 9 Block 5	Also known as Astra 1P
SES-25	19.2° E	Thales Alenia Space	Spacebus-NEO 200	Ku-band	2027	TBA	Also known as Astra 1Q
SES-26		Thales Alenia Space	Space Inspire	Ku-band, C-Band	2027	TBA	

== O3b fleet ==
The O3b fleet was initially owned and operated by O3b Networks, which became a wholly owned subsidiary of SES in 2016 Orbiting in Medium Earth orbit (MEO), the first generation satellites are sometimes referred to as "O3b MEO" to more clearly distinguish them from the second generation O3b mPOWER constellation - first launched in 2016, and commenced service in 2024.

Legend
Active fleet
Future launches

Name	NORAD ID	Int'l Code	Launch Date	Launch Vehicle	Period (min)
O3B PFM	39191	2013-031D	25 June 2013	Soyuz ST-B (VS05)	287.9
O3B FM2	39190	2013-031C	25 June 2013	Soyuz ST-B (VS05)	287.9
O3B FM3	40082	2014-038D	10 July 2014	Soyuz ST-B (VS08)	287.9
O3B FM4	39189	2013-031B	25 June 2013	Soyuz ST-B (VS05)	287.9
O3B FM5	39188	2013-031A	25 June 2013	Soyuz ST-B (VS05)	287.9
O3B FM6	40080	2014-038B	10 July 2014	Soyuz ST-B (VS08)	287.9
O3B FM7	40081	2014-038C	10 July 2014	Soyuz ST-B (VS08)	287.9
O3B FM8	40079	2014-038A	10 July 2014	Soyuz ST-B (VS08)	287.9
O3B FM9	40351	2014-083D	18 December 2014	Soyuz ST-B (VS10)	287.9
O3B FM10	40348	2014-083A	18 December 2014	Soyuz ST-B (VS10)	287.9
O3B FM11	40349	2014-083B	18 December 2014	Soyuz ST-B (VS10)	287.9
O3B FM12	40350	2014-083C	18 December 2014	Soyuz ST-B (VS10)	287.9
O3B FM13	43234	2018-024D	9 March 2018	Soyuz ST-B (VS18)	287.9
O3B FM14	43233	2018-024C	9 March 2018	Soyuz ST-B (VS18)	287.9
O3B FM15	43231	2018-024A	9 March 2018	Soyuz ST-B (VS18)	287.9
O3B FM16	43232	2018-024B	9 March 2018	Soyuz ST-B (VS18)	287.9
O3B FM17	44114	2019-020C	4 April 2019	Soyuz ST-B (VS22)	287.9
O3B FM18	44115	2019-020D	4 April 2019	Soyuz ST-B (VS22)	287.9
O3B FM19	44113	2019-020B	4 April 2019	Soyuz ST-B (VS22)	287.9
O3B FM20	44112	2019-020A	4 April 2019	Soyuz ST-B (VS22)	287.9
O3b mPOWER 1 (O3b FM21)	54755	2022-174A	16 December 2022	Falcon 9 Block 5	288
O3b mPOWER 2 (O3b FM22)	54756	2022-174B	16 December 2022	Falcon 9 Block 5	288
O3b mPOWER 3 (O3b FM23)	56368	2023-059B	28 April 2023	Falcon 9 Block 5	287
O3b mPOWER 4 (O3b FM24)	56367	2023-059A	28 April 2023	Falcon 9 Block 5	288
O3b mPOWER 5 (O3b FM25)	58346	2023-175A	12 November 2023	Falcon 9 Block 5	288
O3b mPOWER 6 (O3b FM26)	58347	2023-175B	12 November 2023	Falcon 9 Block 5	288
O3b mPOWER 7 (O3b FM28)	62362	2024-244A	17 December 2024	Falcon 9 Block 5	288
O3b mPOWER 8 (O3b FM28)	62363	2024-244B	17 December 2024	Falcon 9 Block 5	288
O3b mPOWER 9 (O3b FM29)			2026	Falcon 9 Block 5	
O3b mPOWER 10 (O3b FM30)			2026	Falcon 9 Block 5	
O3b mPOWER 11 (O3b FM31)			2026	Falcon 9 Block 5	
O3b mPOWER 12 (O3b FM32)			2026		
O3b mPOWER 13 (O3b FM33)			2026		

== Third-party satellites ==
SES also manages some transponders on a few third-party satellites under joint operating agreements.

Legend
Active fleet

Satellite	Location	Manufacturer	Model	Coverage	Launch date	Launch vehicle	Comments
Ciel-2	129° W	Thales Alenia Space	Spacebus 4000C4	32 K_{u}-band transponders HDTV for North America	10 December 2008	Proton-M/Briz-M	
MonacoSAT	52° E	Thales Alenia Space	Spacebus 4000C2	12 K_{u}-band transponders HDTV for Middle East and North Africa	27 April 2015	Falcon 9 v1.1	Satellite shared with the Turkmenistan National Space Agency
QuetzSat 1	77° W	Space Systems/Loral	LS-1300	32 K_{u}-band transponders HDTV for Mexico, USA and Central America.	29 September 2011	Proton-M/Briz-M	
Yahsat 1A	52.5° E	EADS Astrium	Eurostar E3000	14 active C-band transponders, 25 K_{u}-band, 21 secure K_{a}-band; Broadcast TV for Europe, Middle East, North Africa	22 April 2011	Ariane 5 ECA	

== See also ==
- SES
- SES Americom
- SES Astra
- SES Sirius
- List of broadcast satellites
