= SES-4 =

Communications satellite

- Names: NSS-14
- Mission type: Communications
- Operator: SES New Skies / SES
- COSPAR ID: 2012-007A
- SATCAT no.: 38087
- Website: https://www.ses.com/
- Mission duration: 15 years (planned); 13 years, 20 days (elapsed)

Spacecraft properties
- Spacecraft: NSS-14
- Bus: SSL-1300
- Manufacturer: Space Systems/Loral
- Launch mass: 6,180 kg (13,620 lb)
- Power: 20 kW

Start of mission
- Launch date: 14 February 2012, 19:36:37 UTC
- Rocket: Proton-M / Briz-M
- Launch site: Baikonur, Site 200/39
- Contractor: Khrunichev State Research and Production Space Center
- Entered service: April 2012

Orbital parameters
- Reference system: Geocentric orbit
- Regime: Geostationary orbit
- Longitude: 22° West

Transponders
- Band: 124 transponders: 52 C-band; 72 Ku-band
- Bandwidth: 36 MHz
- Coverage area: North America, South America, Europe, Middle East, West Africa

SES-4 is a communications satellite operated by SES World Skies (now SES).

== Spacecraft ==
SES-4 was built by Space Systems/Loral (SSL), and is based on the SSL-1300 satellite bus. It is equipped with 52 C-band, and 72 Ku-band transponders, and at launch it had a mass of 6,180 kg (13,620 lb). It has a design life of fifteen years.

== Launch ==
It was launched on 14 February 2012, at 19:36:37 UTC on a Proton-M / Briz-M launch vehicle, the launch was arranged by International Launch Services (ILS), since Baikonour, Site 200/39.

== Mission ==
It is positioned at 22° West orbital location over Atlantic Ocean, replacing NSS-7.
