= Intelsat VA F-13 =

Geostationary communications satellite

Intelsat VA F-13 → NSS-513
- Mission type: Communication
- Operator: Intelsat (1988-1998); New Satellite Skies (1998-2003)
- COSPAR ID: 1988-040A
- SATCAT no.: 19121
- Mission duration: 7 years (planned)

Spacecraft properties
- Bus: Intelsat VA
- Manufacturer: Ford Aerospace
- Launch mass: 1981 kg
- Dry mass: 1098 kg
- Dimensions: 1.66 x 2.1 x 1.77 metres
- Power: 1800 watts

Start of mission
- Launch date: 17 May 1988, 23:58:00 UTC
- Rocket: Ariane 2 V23
- Launch site: Kourou, ELA-1
- Contractor: Aérospatiale

End of mission
- Disposal: Graveyard orbit
- Deactivated: July 2003

Orbital parameters
- Reference system: Geocentric orbit
- Regime: Geostationary orbit
- Longitude: 53.0° West (1988-1995); 177.0° West (1995-2003)
- Epoch: 17 May 1988

Transponders
- Band: 26 C-band; 6 Ku-band

Intelsat VA F-13 or Intelsat 513, then named 'NSS-513', was a communications satellite operated by Intelsat and which was later sold to New Satellite Skies. Launched in 1988, it was the thirteenth of fifteen Intelsat V satellites to be launched. The Intelsat V series was constructed by Ford Aerospace, based on the Intelsat VA satellite bus. Intelsat VA F-13 was part of an advanced series of satellites designed to provide greater telecommunications capacity for Intelsat's global network.

== Satellite ==
The satellite was box-shaped, measuring 1.66 by 2.1 by 1.77 metres; solar arrays spanned 15.9 metres tip to tip. The arrays, supplemented by nickel-hydrogen batteries during eclipse, provided 1800 watts of power at mission onset, approximately 1280 watts at the end of its seven-year design life. The payload housed 26 C-band and 6 Ku-band transponders. It could accommodate 15,000 two-way voice circuits and two TV channels simultaneously. It also provided maritime communications for ships at sea.

== Launch ==
The satellite was successfully launched into space on 17 May 1988, at 23:58:00 UTC, by means of an Ariane 2 vehicle from the Centre Spatial Guyanais, Kourou, French Guiana. It had a launch mass of 1981 kg. The Intelsat VA F-13 was equipped with 6 Ku-band transponders more 26 C-band transponders for 15,000 audio circuits and two TV channels.

== NSS-513 ==
Intelsat 513 was sold to New Satellite Skies on 30 November 1998, and renamed NSS-513. The satellite was deactivated in August 2003.
