= NSS-806 =

Communications satellite

Coordinates: 0°N 47.5°W

- Mission type: Communications
- Operator: Intelsat → SES World Skies
- COSPAR ID: 1998-014A
- SATCAT no.: 25239
- Mission duration: 15 years

Spacecraft properties
- Spacecraft type: AS-7000
- Manufacturer: Lockheed Martin
- Launch mass: 3,720 kg (8,200 lb)
- Dry mass: 2,200 kg (4,900 lb)

Start of mission
- Launch date: February 28, 1998, 00:21 UTC
- Rocket: Atlas IIAS AC-151
- Launch site: Cape Canaveral SLC-36B

Orbital parameters
- Reference system: Geocentric
- Regime: Geostationary
- Eccentricity: 0.0004615
- Perigee altitude: 35,806.0 kilometres (22,248.8 mi)
- Apogee altitude: 35,767.0 kilometres (22,224.6 mi)
- Inclination: 0.058°
- Period: 1,436.1 minutes
- Epoch: May 7, 2017

Transponders
- Band: 28 C Band, 3 K_{u} band
- Coverage area: Americas, Europe

NSS-806 (New Skies Satellite 806), before Intelsat 806, is a communications satellite originally operated by Intelsat. Launched in 1998 it was operated in geostationary orbit at a longitude of 47 degrees west for around 15 years. It is currently located in the orbital position of 47.5 degrees west longitude, was initially operated by Intelsat, orbited at 40.5 degrees west, and was purchased by SES World Skies (a subsidiary of SES).

== Satellite ==
NSS-806 is equipped with 28 transponders in C band and 3 in Ku band, making transmissions for the Americas and parts of Europe. In order to receive the signal it requires a monofocal antenna (LNBF antenna in the center), a LNBF for C band (5150 MHz) and a digital receiver compatible with C band. The NSS-806 emits its signal in circular polarization.

== Launch ==
The launch of NSS-806 made use of an Atlas II rocket flying from Cape Canaveral Air Force Station, Florida, United States. The launch took place at 00:21 UTC on February 28, 1998, with the spacecraft entering a geosynchronous transfer orbit. NSS-806 subsequently fired its apogee motor to achieve geostationary orbit.

== Health and replacement ==
In July 2017, seven years past its 12-year intended design life, NSS-806 lost the use of 12 of its 39 transponders. NSS-806's replacement, SES-14, was scheduled to be launched in first quarter of 2018 on a SpaceX Falcon 9, and SES predicted that the transponder failure would result in a revenue loss of between 7 and 9 million euros. The following month, SES arranged to swap flights so that SES-12 would launch in January 2018 on an Ariane 5, with SES-12, originally scheduled for that flight, now launching on the Falcon 9 later in Q1.

SES-14 was launched from Kourou on 25 January 2018, but was placed in an incorrect orbit due to a launch vehicle anomaly. SES reported that the all-electric SES-14 would take four more weeks than originally planned to reach its operating orbit, but that the satellite was healthy and was expected to meet its designed life time. SES-14's in-service date, originally set for July 2018, was expected to be pushed back until at least August 2018.

== Technical details ==
C-Band slot chart
Slot	Uplink (GHz)	Downlink (GHz)	Hemi A	Hemi B	Bandwidth (MHz)
5'-6'	6.527	3.502	12'	22'	72
3'-4'	6.607	3.582	11'	21'	72
1'-2'	5.888	3.663	10	20	72
1-2	5.968	3.743	11	21	72
3	6.028	3.803	12A	22A	36
4	6.068	3.843	12B	22B	36
5	6.108	3.883	13A	23A	36
6	6.148	3.923	13B	23B	36
7	6.201	3.976	14A	24A	36
9	6.280	4.055	15	25	36
10	6.320	4.095	16	26	36
11	6.360	4.135	17	27	36
12	6.4025	4.1775	18	28	41

Ku-band slot chart
Slot	Uplink (GHz) Polariztion H	Downlink (GHz) Polarization V	Spot 1	Bandwidth (MHz)
1-2	14.0425	12.7475	261	77
3-4	14.125	11.830	262	72
5-6	14.205	11.910	263	72
