= SES-11 =

Geostationary communications satellite

SES-11 / EchoStar 105
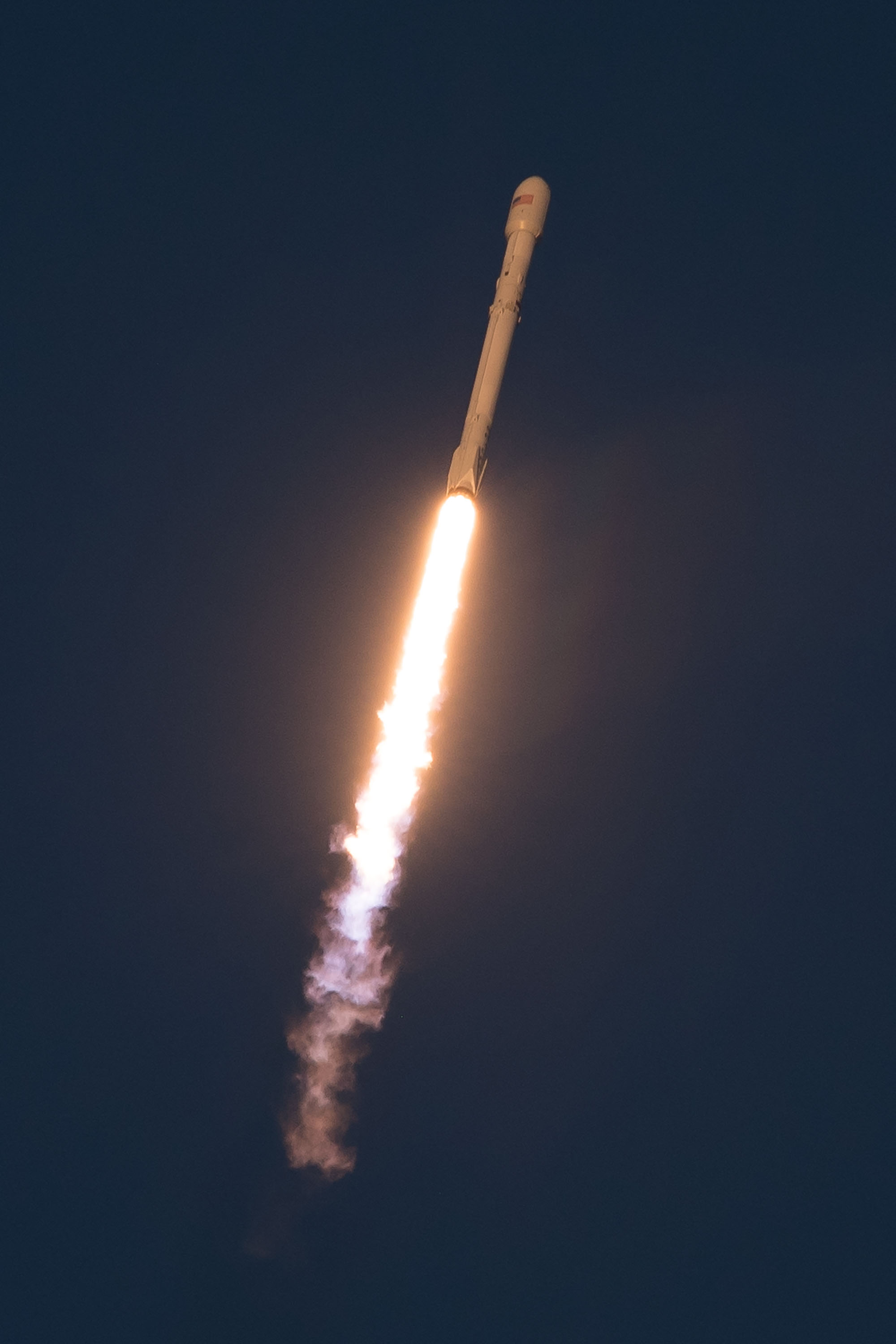
- Launch of SES-11
- Names: EchoStar 105
- Mission type: Communications
- Operator: SES / EchoStar
- COSPAR ID: 2017-063A
- SATCAT no.: 42967
- Website: https://www.ses.com/
- Mission duration: 15 years (planned); 9 years, 29 days (elapsed)

Spacecraft properties
- Spacecraft: SES-11 / EchoStar 105
- Spacecraft type: Eurostar
- Bus: Eurostar-3000
- Manufacturer: Airbus Defence and Space
- Launch mass: 5,400 kg (11,900 lb)
- Power: 12 kW

Start of mission
- Launch date: 11 October 2017, 22:53:00 UTC
- Rocket: Falcon 9 Full Thrust (s/n B1031.2)
- Launch site: Kennedy Space Center, LC-39A
- Contractor: SpaceX
- Entered service: 29 November 2017

Orbital parameters
- Reference system: Geocentric orbit
- Regime: Geostationary orbit
- Longitude: 105° West

Transponders
- Band: 48 transponders: 24 C-band; 24 Ku-band
- Bandwidth: 36 MHz
- Coverage area: Hawaii, North America, Latin America, Caribbean

SES-11 / EchoStar 105 is a geostationary communications satellite operated by SES and EchoStar and designed and manufactured by Airbus Defence and Space. It has a mass of 5,200 kg (11,500 lb) and has a design life of at least 15 years.

The spacecraft had been ready to beam television programming and video services across the Americas for SES and EchoStar. The Falcon 9 launch vehicle has placed the satellite into a high-altitude supersynchronous transfer orbit.

== See also ==
- SES
- List of SES satellites
