= NSS-703 =

Geostationary communications satellite

- Mission type: Communications
- Operator: Intelsat (1994-1998); SES World Skies (1998-2014)
- COSPAR ID: 1994-064A
- SATCAT no.: 23305
- Mission duration: 15 years design life

Spacecraft properties
- Bus: SSL-1300
- Manufacturer: Space Systems/Loral
- Launch mass: 3,695 kilograms (8,146 lb)
- Dry mass: 1,450 kilograms (3,200 lb)

Start of mission
- Launch date: 06 October 1994, 06:35:02 UTC
- Rocket: Atlas IIAS AC111
- Launch site: Cape Canaveral LC-36B

End of mission
- Disposal: Decommissioned
- Deactivated: October 2014

Orbital parameters
- Reference system: Geocentric
- Regime: Geostationary
- Longitude: 47° W
- Semi-major axis: 42,437 kilometres (26,369 mi)
- Perigee altitude: 36,042.7 kilometres (22,395.9 mi)
- Apogee altitude: 36,091.0 kilometres (22,425.9 mi)
- Inclination: 5.9 degrees
- Period: 1,450.1 minutes
- Epoch: April 28, 2017

Transponders
- Band: 26 C band 10 Ku band
- Coverage area: Americas, Africa, Europe, Atlantic Ocean

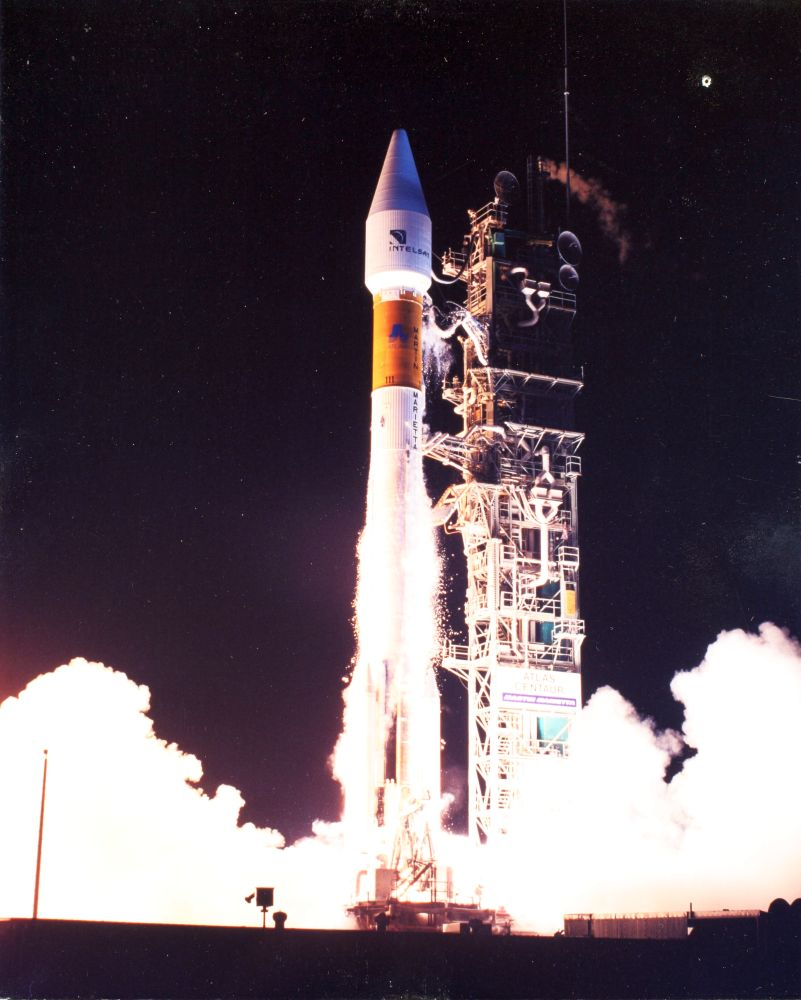
Launch of NSS-703.

NSS-703 (also known as Intelsat 703, IS-703 and Intelsat 7-F3) is a geostationary communication satellite that was built by Space Systems/Loral (SSL). It is located in the orbital position of 29.5 degrees east longitude and it is currently in an inclined orbit. The same is owned by Intelsat and after sold to SES World Skies on November 30, 1998. The satellite was based on the LS-1300 platform and its estimated useful life was 15 years.

The satellite was successfully launched into space on October 6, 1994, at 06:35:02, using an Atlas II vehicle from the Cape Canaveral Air Force Station, United States. It had a launch mass of 3,695 kg.

The NSS-703 is equipped with 26 transponders in C band and 10 in Ku band to provide broadcasting, business-to-home services, telecommunications, VSATnetworks.
