= SES-12 =

Geostationary communications satellite

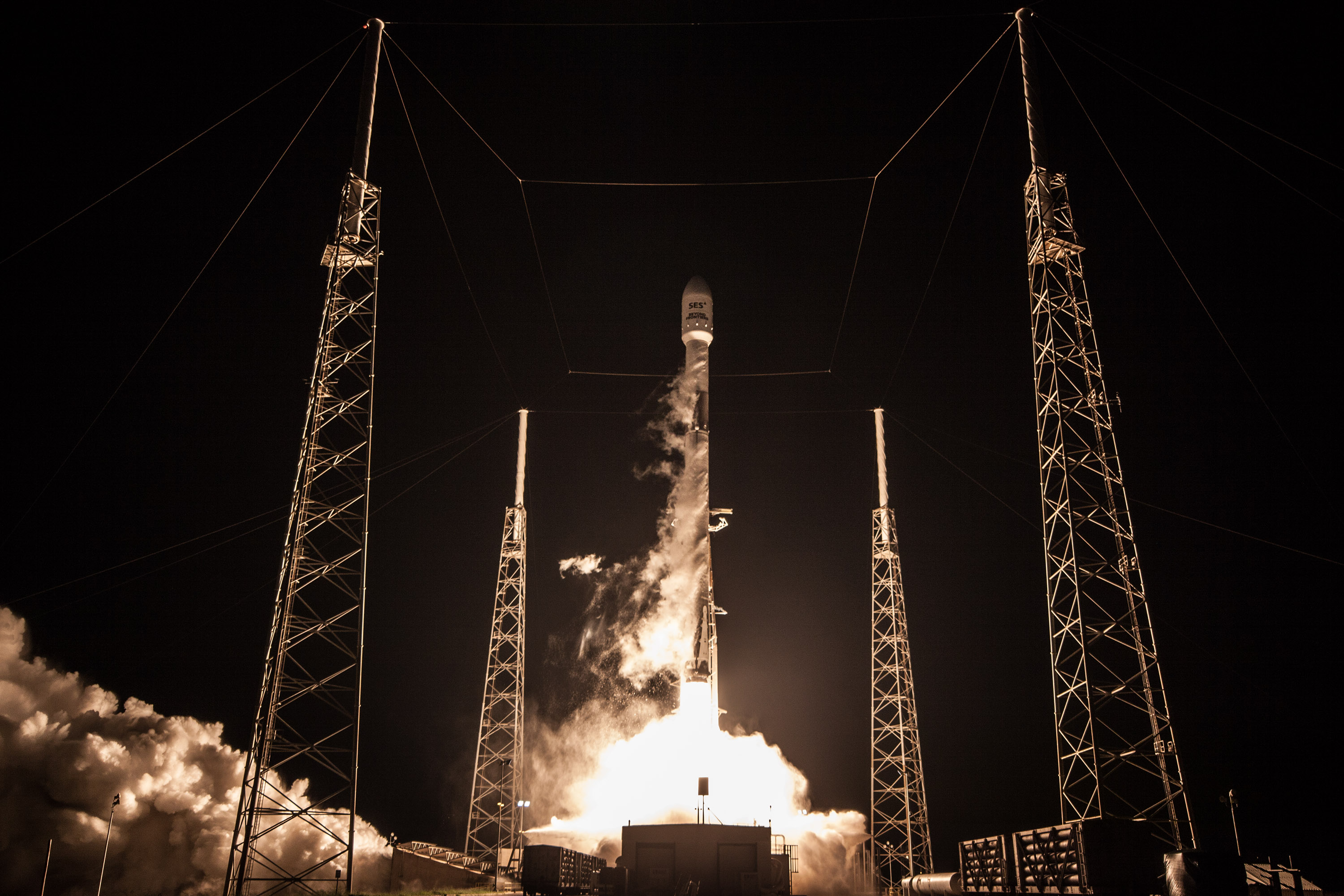
- SES-12 launches aboard a Falcon 9 rocket.
- Mission type: Communications
- Operator: SES
- COSPAR ID: 2018-049A
- SATCAT no.: 43488
- Website: https://www.ses.com/
- Mission duration: 15 years (planned); 7 years, 10 months, 24 days (elapsed)

Spacecraft properties
- Spacecraft type: Eurostar
- Bus: Eurostar-300EOR
- Manufacturer: Airbus Defence and Space
- Launch mass: 5,384 kg (11,870 lb)

Start of mission
- Launch date: 4 June 2018, 04:45:00 UTC
- Rocket: Falcon 9 Full Thrust, B1040-2
- Launch site: Cape Canaveral, SLC-40
- Contractor: SpaceX
- Entered service: August 2018

Orbital parameters
- Reference system: Geocentric orbit
- Regime: Geostationary orbit
- Longitude: 95° East

Transponders
- Band: 54 Ku-band
- Coverage area: South Asia, Asia-Pacific

SES-12 is a geostationary communications satellite operated by SES.

== Satellite description ==
SES-12 was designed and manufactured by Airbus Defence and Space. It has a mass of 5,384 kg (11,870 lb) and has a design life of at least 15 years.

== Launch ==
SES-12 was successfully launched on a SpaceX Block 4 (booster B1040.2) Falcon 9 rocket from Cape Canaveral SLC-40 on 4 June 2018 at 04:45:00 UTC, and was successfully released into orbit approximately 33 minutes later.

== Market ==
The SES-12 satellite expands SES's capabilities to provide direct-to-home (DTH) broadcasting, Very-small-aperture terminal (VSAT), mobility, and High-Throughput Satellite (HTS) data connectivity services in the Asia-Pacific region, including rapidly growing markets such as India and Indonesia. The satellite replaces NSS-6 at this location and is co-located with SES-8. SES-12 is capable of supporting requirements in multiple verticals from Cyprus in the West to Japan in the East, and from Russia in the North to Australia in the South.

Together with SES-8, it reaches 18 million homes.

== See also ==
- SES, owner and operator of SES-12
- List of SES satellites
