= AMC-6 =

- Names: GE-6 (1997-2001); AMC-6 (2001-present); Rainbow 2 (2004-present)
- Mission type: Communications
- Operator: GE Americom (2000-2001); SES Americom (2001-2009); SES World Skies (2009-2011); SES (2011-present)
- COSPAR ID: 2000-067A
- SATCAT no.: 26580
- Website: AMC-6 website
- Mission duration: 15 years (planned); 24 years, 4 months, 26 days (elapsed)

Spacecraft properties
- Spacecraft: GE-6
- Bus: A2100AX
- Manufacturer: Lockheed Martin
- Launch mass: 3,909 kg (8,618 lb)

Start of mission
- Launch date: 21 October 2000, 22:00:00 UTC
- Rocket: Proton-K / DM3
- Launch site: Baikonur, Site 81/23
- Contractor: Khrunichev State Research and Production Space Center

Orbital parameters
- Reference system: Geocentric orbit
- Regime: Geostationary orbit
- Longitude: 72° West

Transponders
- Band: 52 transponders: 24 C-band; 28 Ku-band
- Frequency: 36 MHz; 72 MHz (4 Ku-band)
- Coverage area: North America, Greenland, Latin America

AMC-6, formerly GE-6, is a commercial broadcast communications satellite owned by SES Launched on 21 October 2000, from Baikonur Cosmodrome in Kazakhstan, AMC-6 became the fifth hybrid C-band / Ku-band satellite in the GE Americom fleet. The satellite provides coverage to the continental United States, Canada, the Caribbean islands, southern Greenland, and Latin America. Located in a geostationary orbit parallel to the eastern United States coastline, AMC-6 provides service to commercial and government customers, and is used as an Internet platform due to its wide coverage, scale and redundancy. Some of its capabilities include Very-small-aperture terminal (VSAT) networking, satellite news gathering and Ku-band transceiver service. Launched as GE-6, it was renamed AMC-6 when SES took over GE Americom in 2001, forming SES Americom. This merged with SES New Skies in 2009 to form SES World Skies.

== Rainbow 2 ==
Rainbow Media announced in November 2004, that it will utilize 16 transponders on the AMC-6 satellite, which VOOM refers to as Rainbow 2.
