= SES-6 =

Satellite

- Mission type: Communications
- Operator: SES
- COSPAR ID: 2013-026A
- SATCAT no.: 39172
- Website: https://www.ses.com/
- Mission duration: 15 years (planned); 13 years, 3 months, 12 days (elapsed)

Spacecraft properties
- Spacecraft type: Eurostar
- Bus: Eurostar-3000
- Manufacturer: EADS Astrium
- Launch mass: 6,010 kg (13,250 lb)

Start of mission
- Launch date: 3 June 2013, 09:18:31 UTC
- Rocket: Proton-M / Briz-M
- Launch site: Baikonur, Site 200/39
- Contractor: Khrunichev State Research and Production Space Center
- Entered service: August 2013

Orbital parameters
- Reference system: Geocentric orbit
- Regime: Geostationary orbit
- Longitude: 40° West

Transponders
- Band: 91 transponders: 43 C-band; 48 Ku-band
- Bandwidth: 36 MHz
- Coverage area: North America, Latin America, Europe, Atlantic Ocean

SES-6 is a commercial geostationary communication satellite owned and operated by SES

== Launch ==
Constructed by EADS Astrium, it was launched on 3 June 2013 at 09:18:31 UTC from Baikonour by Proton-M / Briz-M launch vehicle and carries 43 C-band and 48 Ku-band transponders. With 43 C-band and 48 Ku-band 36 MHz equivalent transponders (38 C-band and 36 Ku-band physical transponders), the 6,010 kg (13,250 lb) satellite has a design life of 15 years. It is built on the Eurostar-3000 satellite bus.

== Market ==
The SES-6 satellite replaces the aging NSS-806 (launched on 28 February 1998 as Intelsat 806). It is nearly twice as large as NSS-806, with two C-band beams and has a total of five steerable Ku-band beams, including four beams for the Americas and one beam covering the Atlantic Ocean region. The C-band beams cover the East Atlantic (Europe, North Africa) and West Atlantic (United States, Mexico, South America). The Ku-band beams cover East Atlantic (Europe, Iceland, Greenland), West Atlantic (Eastern United States, Eastern Canada) and Brazil.

SES-6 gave the cable community 50% more C-band capacity than NSS-806, while retaining the ability to deliver content across the Americas and Europe using the same high-powered beam. In addition, SES-6 increased Ku-band capacity in the Americas through dedicated high-power beams over Brazil, the South Cone, the Andean region, North America, Mexico, Central America, and the Caribbean. The satellite also carries a payload designed to support maritime and aeronautical communications along routes between North America, the Gulf of Mexico, the North Atlantic, and Europe..

Following the launch, SES announced a long-term capacity agreement to provide a new direct-to-home (DTH) platform in Brazil with Brazilian telecommunications group Oi, which would become the largest user of the new satellite.

== See also ==
- SES (satellite operator)
