= NSS-9 =

Communications satellite

Coordinates: 0°0′N 177°00′W

- Mission type: Communications
- Operator: SES New Skies (2009); SES World Skies (2009-2011); SES (2011-present)
- COSPAR ID: 2009-008A
- SATCAT no.: 33749
- Mission duration: 15 years

Spacecraft properties
- Bus: GEOStar-2
- Manufacturer: Orbital Sciences
- Launch mass: 2,230 kilograms (4,920 lb)
- Power: 2,300 watts

Start of mission
- Launch date: 12 February 2009, 22:09 UTC
- Rocket: Ariane 5ECA V187
- Launch site: Kourou ELA-3
- Contractor: Arianespace

Orbital parameters
- Reference system: Geocentric
- Regime: Geostationary
- Longitude: 177° west
- Perigee altitude: 35,783 kilometres (22,235 mi)
- Apogee altitude: 35,801 kilometres (22,246 mi)
- Inclination: 0.01 degrees
- Period: 23.93 hours
- Epoch: 29 October 2013, 13:27:57 UTC

NSS-9 is a communications satellite owned by SES World Skies. It is an all C-band satellite intended as a replacement for NSS-5, and has three beams with 44 active C-band transponders.

NSS-9 was built by Orbital Sciences Corporation and launched February 12, 2009 aboard Ariane 5 flight V-187.

Built on the Orbital STAR-2 satellite bus, NSS-9 has an expected useful lifetime extending through 2024.

Its launch has been featured in National Geographic Channel's programme World's Toughest Fixes Satellite Launch S02E01.
