= SES-16 =

Geostationary communications satellite

SES 16 / GovSat-1
- Names: GovSat-1
- Mission type: Communications
- Operator: LuxGovSat
- COSPAR ID: 2018-013A
- SATCAT no.: 43178
- Website: https://www.govsat.lu
- Mission duration: 15 years (planned); 8 years, 2 months, 28 days (elapsed)

Spacecraft properties
- Spacecraft: GovSat-1
- Bus: GEOStar-3
- Manufacturer: Orbital ATK
- Launch mass: 4,230 kg (9,330 lb)

Start of mission
- Launch date: 31 January 2018, UTC
- Rocket: Falcon 9 B1032-2
- Launch site: Cape Canaveral, SLC-40
- Contractor: SpaceX
- Entered service: April 2018

Orbital parameters
- Reference system: Geocentric orbit
- Regime: Geostationary orbit
- Longitude: 21° East

Transponders
- Band: 68 transponders: Ka-band, X-band
- Bandwidth: 36 MHz
- Coverage area: Europe

SES-16 / GovSat-1 is a geostationary communications satellite designed and manufactured by Orbital ATK. It is operated by LuxGovSat which is a joint venture between SES and the Luxembourg government. It has a mass of 4,230 kg (9,330 lb) and has a design life of at least 15 years. The satellite was launched by SpaceX on 31 January 2018.

== See also ==
- SES
- List of SES satellites
