= AMC-8 =

Communications satellite launched in 2000

- Names: GE-8 (2000-2001); AMC-8 (2001-present); Aurora-3 (2000-present); Aurora-III
- Mission type: Communications
- Operator: GE Americom (2000–2001); SES Americom (2001-2009); SES World Skies (2009-2011); SES (2011-present)
- COSPAR ID: 2000-081B
- SATCAT no.: 26639
- Website: SES World Skies - AMC-8
- Mission duration: 15 years (planned); 25 years, 3 months, 4 days (elapsed)

Spacecraft properties
- Spacecraft: GE-8
- Bus: A2100
- Manufacturer: Lockheed Martin
- Launch mass: 2,015 kg (4,442 lb)

Start of mission
- Launch date: 20 December 2000, 00:26 UTC
- Rocket: Ariane 5G (V138)
- Launch site: Centre Spatial Guyanais, ELA-3
- Contractor: Arianespace

Orbital parameters
- Reference system: Geocentric orbit
- Regime: Geostationary orbit
- Longitude: 139° West

Transponders
- Band: 24 C-band
- Frequency: 36 MHz
- Coverage area: Canada, Alaska, United States, Mexico, Caribbean

AMC-8, also known as Aurora III, previously GE-8, is a C-band satellite located at 139° West, covering the United States, Canada and the Caribbean. It is owned and operated by SES World Skies, formerly SES Americom and before that GE Americom. The satellite provides critical telecommunications services to AT&T Alascom, which occupies most of the satellite's capacity. AMC-8 was launched in 2000 as GE-8, and replaced Satcom-C5 in March 2001.

AMC-8 was used by thousands of terrestrial radio stations for network feeds using ground equipment from Starguide, X-Digital Systems, Wegener and International Datacasting. Major tenants were Cumulus Media Networks Satellite Services (which includes Citadel Media, Talk Radio Network, WOR Radio Network and others), Skyview Networks (which includes ABC News, ABC Radio, California News Network, Arizona News Network, numerous Professional and Collegian Sports networks, and others), Orbital Media Networks (which includes United Stations Radio Networks, John Tesh, and others), Premiere Radio Networks, Dial Global, Westwood One, Learfield Communications, The Free Beer and Hot Wings Show (Transponder 15), and others. However, these were moved over to another satellite, AMC-18. Audio network transmissions on AMC-8 ended as of midnight 30 June 2017. Since AMC-8 is past its design life, it will soon be decommissioned. As of 1 July 2017, there are no plans to put another satellite in AMC-8's orbital slot (139° West).

It carries 24 36 MHz C-band transponders, with 20 watts SSPA amplifiers. Its amplifier redundancy is 16 for 12, and its receiver redundancy is four for two. It carries two beacons, one broadcasting on a horizontal frequency of 3700.5 MHz, and the other on a vertical frequency of 4199.5 MHz.

Animation of AMC-8 trajectory around the Earth
