= Tongasat =

Tongan communications satellite operator

Tongasat is the licensed agent of the Kingdom of Tonga responsible for making and coordinating Tonga's satellite filings to the International Telecommunication Union and then licensing those satellite filings to international satellite operators for their commercial use, in effect a flag of convenience for space. Tonga was the sixth-largest claimant of orbital slots due to Tongasat's efforts. In 2002, Tongasat launched the Esiafi 1 satellite; as of 2015, a satellite in its spot was still in operation.

== History ==
Location of Tonga

Matt Nilson, the founder of Tongasat, had previously started a satellite company, Advanced Business Communications Inc, and got approval to launch two satellites; the project, however, soon failed. He launched Tongasat after moving to Tonga from San Diego originally to retire in 1987.

Through personal connections, Nilson communicated his idea to Princess Salote Pilolevu Tuita, who then informed her father, King Taufa'ahau Tupou IV, of the idea. Tāufaʻāhau Tupou, intrigued partially because of Tonga's poor communication systems, set up a formal meeting with Nilson in November 1987. Nilson convinced the king to secure orbital slots from the International Telecommunication Union along with other Oceanic nations. In April 1988, the Tongan government authorized the company, officially established as the Friendly Islands Satellite Communications Inc and registered on 13 February 1989.

Tongasat's goal was to both profit commercially from the slots and to create a regional network in the Pacific to promote satellite operation. While the Government would not have to fund operations, it would receive half of the profit. The company began with a loan by Nilson of $1,000,000. Tongasat planned to lease each spot for $2,000,000 a year, which could have resulted in a 20% increase in Tonga's national budget. Tongasat, by commercializing orbital slots, created a market for space that previously had not existed. Tongasat ended up charging around $700,000 per transponder. In September 1994, Tongasat's market capitalization was valued at $45 million. After years of opaque finances supporting Salote Pilolevu Tuita, in 2009 the company paid back its debts to the Tongan government. In August 2018, Tongasat was convicted of transferring money from a Chinese venture to Salote Pelolevu Tuita instead of the government. Tongasat appealed, which was rejected by the Supreme Court.

Nilson's application for sixteen out of a total of 180 orbital slots on 23 March 1990 - the last useful unclaimed ones - from the ITU sparked widespread outrage. Intelsat, which had a near monopoly on Earth's satellite slots, had forgotten to claim the spots. Intelsat and foreign governments (such as the United States) thought the claim to be utterly ridiculous, and others concluded it was a money-making scheme. Both were particularly displeased as it uprooted a "gentlemen's agreement" whereby core countries controlled the orbital slots, while Tongasat would create a commercial market for those slots. According to Jonathon Ezor, "Tonga could have become a key player in the world telecommunications community" with its claim. After Nilson asked for six slots instead of sixteen, the ITU acquiesced in March 1991. Tongasat acquired a seventh slot soon after and eventually two more for a total of nine. Tonga's nine slots included slots at 14.0 degrees East, 70.0 degrees East, 83.3 degrees East, 130.0 degrees East, 134.0 degrees East, 138,0 degrees East, 142.5 degrees East, 170.75 degrees East, and 257.0 degrees East.

In October 1991, Unicom Satellite Corporation licensed two orbital slots from Tongasat, but failed to obtain the necessary funds to start operations. In April 1992, however, Rimsat Ltd. licensed slots and succeeded in launching three satellites. Tongasat also licensed one position to APT Satellite Company and negotiated with Informkosmos for another slot. Informkosmos, in partnership with Rimsat, launched a Russian satellite renamed Tonga Star One into Tonga's 134.0 degrees East slot in August 1993. On 18 November that year, Rimsat One was launched, and on 20 May 1994 Rimsat Two was launched to the 142.5 degree East position. Afterwards, Rimsat filed for bankruptcy in 1995. The Russian government then decided to confiscate the two satellites left and ignored American court rulings and pleas from the American government to return them to Rimsat. By 1997, Tonga had five satellites in space, which soon dwindled to two.

In February 1994, Nilson was fired from Tongasat after an audit uncovered his ownership of Rimsat shares, a clear conflict of interest. In 1996, Tongasat ended its agreement with Rimsat and re-organized internally, hiring an all-Tongan staff.

The United States, China, Asianet, and PT Pasifik Satelit Nusantara all claimed or occupied slots from Tongasat against its wishes. PT Pasifik Satelit Nusantara and the Indonesian government had a long-lived dispute with Tongasat; after multiple summits, they came to a conclusion to share the slot.

On 15 April 2002 Tongasat started its own telecommunications industry when it obtained the Esiafi 1 satellite, previously named Parallax and before that Comstar 4d (launched in 1981), that was moved to Tonga's own geostationary point at 70° East. The satellite was originally launched by NASA on 21 February 1981. This was partially because unused slots automatically expire. In 2003, Tongasat entered into a partnership with General Dynamics to maintain the satellite.

=== Global influence ===
Tongasat inspired comparisons with The Mouse That Roared, as both provoked a much larger country with imaginary creations. Other small countries have followed Tonga's lead in claiming unneeded slots, including Gibraltar, Papua New Guinea and Bermuda. The company also influenced Tonga's foreign relations, leading the country to recognize China instead of Taiwan.

== See also ==
- Satellite Communications
- SES
- GE Americom
