= 1° West =

Orbital satellite position

1° West is an orbital satellite position used by satellites belonging to Telenor Satellite Broadcasting and Intelsat. During the 1990s, it was established as one of the two major satellite positions for DTH reception in the Scandinavian countries (the other being 5° East).

Today, the position is used by the Scandinavian DTH operator Canal Digital, the Romanian DTH operators Digi TV and Focus Sat, as well as some African channels.

== Satellites ==
=== Current ===
- Thor 3
- Thor 5
- Thor 6
- Intelsat 10-02

=== Former ===
- Intelsat 512
- Intelsat 702
- Intelsat 707
- Thor 1
- Thor 2
- TV-Sat 2
