= NSS-7 =

Communications satellite

Coordinates: 0°0′N 20°00′W

- Mission type: Communications
- Operator: New Skies Satellites (2002-2006); SES New Skies (2006-2009); SES World Skies (2009-2011); SES (2011-present)
- COSPAR ID: 2002-019A
- SATCAT no.: 27414
- Mission duration: 15 years

Spacecraft properties
- Bus: A2100AXS
- Manufacturer: Lockheed Martin
- Launch mass: 4,692 kilograms (10,344 lb)

Start of mission
- Launch date: 16 April 2002, 23:02 UTC
- Rocket: Ariane 44L V150
- Launch site: Kourou ELA-2
- Contractor: Arianespace

Orbital parameters
- Reference system: Geocentric
- Regime: Geostationary
- Longitude: 20° west
- Perigee altitude: 35,782 kilometres (22,234 mi)
- Apogee altitude: 35,803 kilometres (22,247 mi)
- Inclination: 0.01 degrees
- Period: 23.93 hours
- Epoch: 27 October 2013, 11:55:45 UTC

NSS-7 is a communications satellite owned by SES. It launched on 16 April 2002 on an AR-44L model of the Ariane 4 launch vehicle.

It is a hybrid Ku- and C-band telecommunications satellite providing fixed satellite services, including video distribution, Internet access, corporate business networking and fixed services such as telephony and data. Based on an enhanced version of Lockheed Martin's A2100AX satellite bus, this 72 transponder satellite initially operated at 22° West longitude over the Atlantic Ocean, providing coverage to the whole of Africa. In May 2012 it shifted over to the 20° West location to take over the duties of NSS-5.
