= NSS-5 =

Geostationary communications satellite

Intelsat 803 → NSS-5
- Mission type: Communications
- Operator: Intelsat → SES World Skies
- COSPAR ID: 1997-053A
- SATCAT no.: 24957
- Mission duration: 14 years

Spacecraft properties
- Spacecraft type: AS-7000
- Manufacturer: Lockheed Martin
- Launch mass: 3,412 kilograms (7,522 lb)

Start of mission
- Launch date: September 23, 1997, 23:58 UTC
- Rocket: Ariane-42L H10-3
- Launch site: Kourou ELA-2
- Contractor: Arianespace

Orbital parameters
- Reference system: Geocentric
- Regime: Geostationary
- Longitude: 50.5° E
- Semi-major axis: 42,164.0 kilometres (26,199.5 mi)
- Perigee altitude: 35,778.2 kilometres (22,231.5 mi)
- Apogee altitude: 35,809.1 kilometres (22,250.7 mi)
- Inclination: 3.8 degrees
- Period: 1,436.1 minutes
- Epoch: May 5, 2017

Transponders
- Band: 38 C Band, 6 Ku band
- Coverage area: Pacific Ocean

NSS-5 (Formerly known as Intelsat 803 and NSS-803) is a communications satellite operated by Intelsat and after by SES World Skies. Launched in 1997 it was operated in geostationary orbit at a longitude of 50.5 degrees east for around 14 years.

== Satellite ==
The third of six Intelsat VIII satellites to be launched, NSS-5 was built by Lockheed Martin. It was a 3,412-kilogram (7,522 lb) spacecraft. The satellite carried a double LEROS-1B apogee motor for propulsion and was equipped with 38 C Band transponders and 6 Ku band transponders, powered by 2 solar cells more batteries. It was designed for a fourteen-year service life.

== Launch ==
The launch of NSS-5 made use of an Ariane 4 rocket flying from Guiana Space Centre, Kourou, French Guiana. The launch took place at 23:58 UTC on September 23, 1997, with the spacecraft entering a geosynchronous transfer orbit. NSS-5 subsequently fired its apogee motor to achieve geostationary orbit.

== See also ==
- 1997 in spaceflight
