= 131st meridian west =

Line of longitude

131st meridian west

The meridian 131° west of Greenwich is a line of longitude that extends from the North Pole across the Arctic Ocean, North America, the Pacific Ocean, the Southern Ocean, and Antarctica to the South Pole.

The 131st meridian west forms a great circle with the 49th meridian east.

== From Pole to Pole ==
Starting at the North Pole and heading south to the South Pole, the 131st meridian west passes through:

Co-ordinates	Country, territory or sea	Notes
90°0′N 131°0′W	Arctic Ocean	
75°8′N 131°0′W	Beaufort Sea	
70°3′N 131°0′W	Canada	Northwest Territories; Yukon — from 64°16′N 131°0′W; British Columbia — from 60°0′N 131°0′W
56°24′N 131°0′W	United States	Alaska — Alaska Panhandle (mainland), Revillagigedo Island, and the Alaska Panhandle again
55°0′N 131°0′W	Dixon Entrance	Passing just east of Zayas Island, British Columbia, Canada (at 54°36′N 131°2′W); Passing just west of Dundas Island, British Columbia, Canada (at 54°30′N 130°58′W); Passing just west of Stephens Island, British Columbia, Canada (at 54°10′N 130°49′W)
50°5′N 131°0′W	Hecate Strait	
52°13′N 131°0′W	Canada	British Columbia — Moresby Island and Kunghit Island
52°0′N 131°0′W	Pacific Ocean	Passing just west of Oeno Island, Pitcairn Islands (at 23°55′S 130°45′W)
60°0′S 131°0′W	Southern Ocean	
74°21′S 131°0′W	Antarctica	Unclaimed territory

== See also ==
- 130th meridian west
- 132nd meridian west
