= GEOStar-3 =

Satellite model made by Northrop Grumman

Spacecraft properties
- Spacecraft type: Spacecraft Bus
- Manufacturer: Northrup Grumman
- Payload mass: 1000 kilograms
- Dimensions: 3.0 to 3.9m x 2.1m x 2.3m
- Power: 8000 watts

The GEOStar-3 is a communications satellite spacecraft model made by Northrop Grumman Innovation Systems. GEOStar-3 represents an evolutionary growth from Northrop Grumman Innovation Systems GEOStar-2 platform. The GEOStar-3 Bus can accommodate payloads of up to 800 kilograms and 8,000 watts.

Some changes to the GEOStar-3 bus include increased battery capacity and solar array power, enabling it to provide up to eight kilowatts of power to the payload. The bus can be customized, including compatibility with all commercially available launch vehicles and the option to launch with another spacecraft on certain launch vehicles. In addition to increased payload power, GEOStar-3 also has the option of utilizing electric propulsion, which allows it to complete its fifteen to seventeen year mission life with less fuel.

== Satellite Orders ==
Satellite	Country	Operator	Type	Coverage	Launch date (GMT)	Rocket	Changes	Status
Al Yah 3	United Arab Emirates	Al Yah Satellite Communications	Communications	58 Ka-band	25 January 2018	Ariane 5 ECA		Active
ASBM 1	Norway	Norwegian Space Agency	Communications	Ka-band, X-band, and EHF payload	12 August 2024	Falcon 9	Also known as Inmarsat GX 10A	Active
ASBM 2	Norway	Norwegian Space Agency	Communications	Ka-band, X-band, and EHF payload	12 August 2024	Falcon 9	Also known as Inmarsat GX 10B	Active
Galaxy 33	United States	Intelsat	Communications	C-band	8 October 2022	Falcon 9	Also known as Galaxy 15R	Active
Galaxy 34	United States	Intelsat	Communications	C-band	8 October 2022	Falcon 9	Also known as Galaxy 12R	Active
GovSat 1	Luxembourg	SES S.A.	Military communications	X-band, Ka-band	31 January 2018	Falcon 9	Known as SES-16	Active
HYLAS-4	United Kingdom	Avanti Communications	Communications	66 Ka-band	5 April 2018	Ariane 5 ECA		Active
MEV 1	United States	Northrop Grumman Innovation Systems	Satellite servicing	Docking adapter	9 October 2019	Proton-M Phase 4		Active (Docked to Intelsat 901)
MEV 2	United States	Northrop Grumman Innovation Systems	Satellite servicing	Docking adapter	15 August 2020	Ariane 5 ECA		Active (Docked to Intelsat 10-02)
MRV (RSGS)	United States	Northrop Grumman Innovation Systems, DARPA	Satellite servicing	Docking adapter	NET 2026	Falcon 9		Awaiting launch
SES 18	Luxembourg	SES S.A.	Communications	C-band	17 March 2023	Falcon 9		Active
SES 19	Luxembourg	SES S.A.	Communications	C-band	17 March 2023	Falcon 9		Active
