= SES-8 =

Geostationary Communications satellite

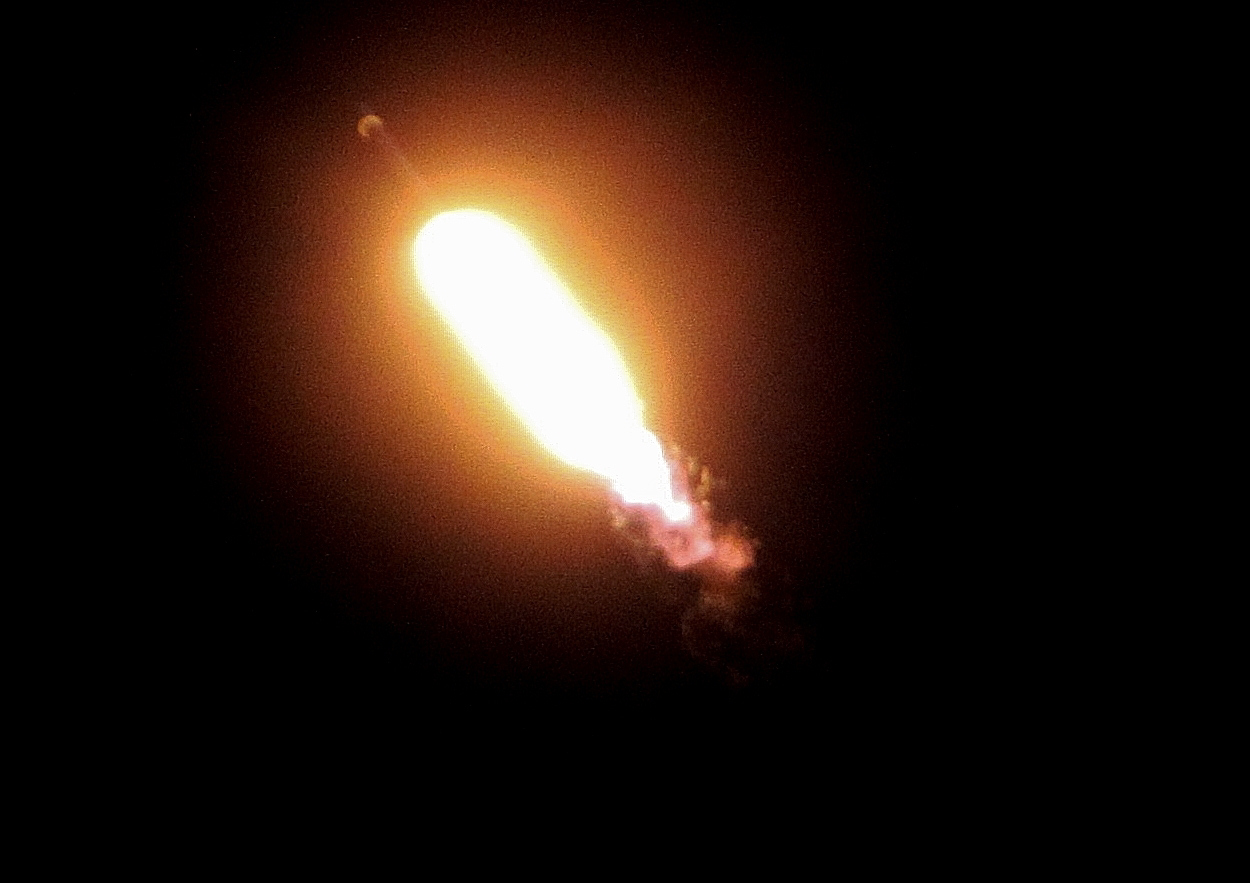
- The SpaceX Falcon 9 rocket carrying the SES-8 communications satellite launches from Cape Canaveral SLC-40.
- Mission type: Communication
- Operator: SES
- COSPAR ID: 2013-071A
- SATCAT no.: 39460
- Website: https://www.ses.com/
- Mission duration: 15 years (planned); 12 years, 4 months, 25 days (elapsed)

Spacecraft properties
- Spacecraft type: GEOStar-2
- Bus: STAR-2.4
- Manufacturer: Orbital Sciences Corporation
- Launch mass: 3,170 kg (6,990 lb)
- Power: 5 kW

Start of mission
- Launch date: 3 December 2013, 22:41:00 UTC
- Rocket: Falcon 9 v1.1
- Launch site: Cape Canaveral, SLC-40
- Contractor: SpaceX
- Entered service: February 2014

Orbital parameters
- Reference system: Geocentric orbit
- Regime: Geostationary orbit
- Longitude: 95° East

Transponders
- Band: 33 Ku-band
- Bandwidth: 36 MHz
- Coverage area: South Asia, India, Indo-China, Thailand, Vietnam, Laos

SES-8 is a geostationary Communications satellite operated by SES SES-8 was successfully launched on SpaceX Falcon 9 v1.1 on 3 December 2013, 22:41:00 UTC.

It was the first flight of any SpaceX launch vehicle to a supersynchronous transfer orbit, an orbit with a somewhat larger apogee than the more usual geostationary transfer orbit (GTO) typically utilised for communication satellites.

== Satellite description ==
The SES-8 satellite is built on the STAR-2.4 satellite bus by Orbital Sciences Corporation (OSC). It is the sixth satellite of that model to be built for SES.

The communications satellite is initially co-located at 95° East with NSS-6 in order to provide communications bandwidth growth capacity in the Asia-Pacific region, specifically aimed at high-growth markets in South Asia and Indo-China, "as well as provide expansion capacity for satellite television (direct-to-home - DTH), Very-small-aperture terminal (VSAT) and government applications".

=== Specifications ===
- Payload mass: 3,170 kg (6,990 lb)
- Electrical power: 5 kW, using Gallium arsenide solar panels, and two 4,850 W⋅h (17,500 kJ) lithium-ion storage batteries
- Battery backup: 4850 Watt-hour lithium-ion battery
- Service life: 15 years

== Launch vehicle ==
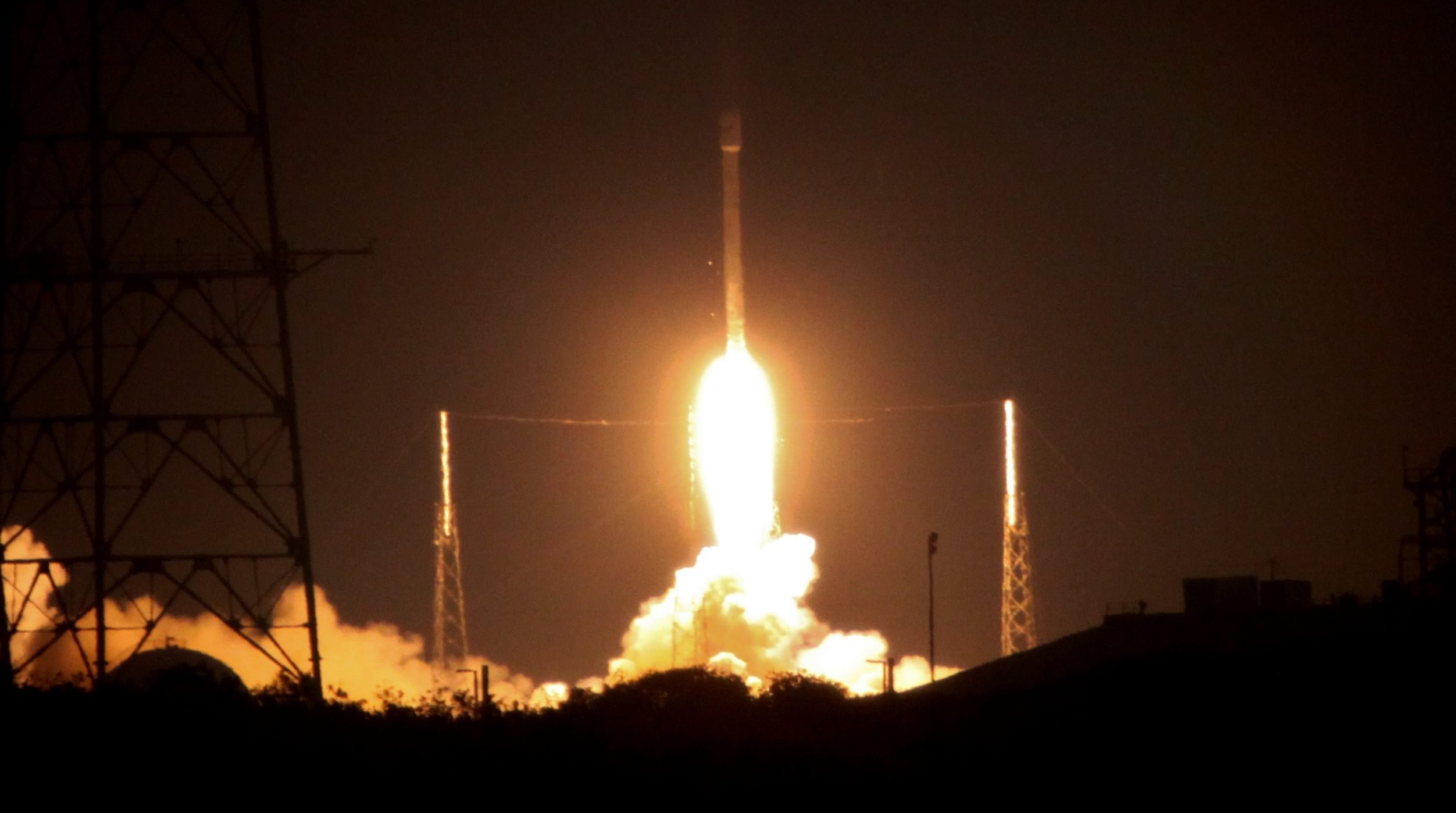
The launch of Falcon 9 v1.1 with SES-8 from Cape Canaveral on 3 December 2013.

The launch of SES-8 was the seventh launch of the Falcon 9 launch vehicle, and the second launch of the Falcon 9 v1.1. SES paid a discounted price — "well under US$60 million" — for the launch since it was the inaugural geostationary launch on the Falcon 9. When originally contracted, in 2011 the putative launch date was early 2013.

The launch was the second launch of the Falcon 9 v1.1 version of the rocket, a longer rocket with 60% more thrust than the Falcon 9 v1.0 vehicle, and the first launch of the larger v1.1 rocket using the rebuilt erector structure at SpaceX' Cape Canaveral SLC-40. As a result, a number of systems on the launch vehicle was flown for only the second time, while several parts of the ground infrastructure at Cape Canaveral were used in a launch for the first time. These include:

- second use of the upgraded Merlin 1D engines, generating approximately 56% more sea-level thrust than the Merlin 1C engines used on the first five Falcon 9 flights
- second use of the significantly longer rocket stages, which were lengthened to accommodate the larger propellant tanks needed to carry propellant for the more powerful engines. The tanks are 60% longer, making the rocket more susceptible to bending during flight.
- the nine Merlin 1D engines on the first stage are arranged in an octagonal pattern with eight engines in a circle and the ninth in the center
- second launch to have a jettisonable payload fairing, which has the risk of an additional separation event that has doomed many missions in the past. Fairing design was done by SpaceX, with production of the 13 m (43 ft) long, 5.2 m (17 ft)-diameter fairing done in Hawthorne, California at the SpaceX rocket factory. Testing of the new fairing design, first required on the CASSIOPE flight (the sixth flight of the Falcon 9), was done at NASA's Plum Brook Station where acoustic shock and mechanical vibration of launch, plus electromagnetic static discharge conditions, were tested on a full-size fairing test article in a very large vacuum chamber. SpaceX paid NASA US$581,296 to lease test time in the US$150 million NASA simulation chamber facility.
- second flight of the vehicle with upgraded avionics and flight software.

In order to maximize the propellant available for the launch of SES-8 into geostationary transfer orbit (GTO), SpaceX did not attempt a controlled descent test of the first-stage booster as they did on the previous Falcon 9 v1.1 flight in September 2013.

=== Second-stage reignition ===
In the previous launch of the Falcon 9 v1.1 — the first launch of the much larger version of the rocket with new Merlin 1D engines — on 29 September 2013, SpaceX was unsuccessful in reigniting the second stage Merlin 1D vacuum engine once the rocket had deployed its primary payload (CASSIOPE) and all of its nanosat secondary payloads. The restart failure was determined to be frozen igniter fluid lines in the second-stage Merlin 1D engine. A minor redesign was done to address the problem by adding additional insulation to the lines.

A second burn of the upper stage was required, and was completed successfully, during the SES-8 mission in order to place the SES-8 telecommunications satellite into the highly elliptical supersynchronous orbit for satellite operator SES to effect a plane change and orbit circularisation.

The Falcon 9 upper stage used to launch SES-8 was left in a decaying elliptical low Earth orbit which, by September 2014, had decayed and re-entered the atmosphere of Earth.

== Prelaunch ==
Both stages of the Falcon 9 arrived at Cape Canaveral for processing before 2 October 2013, after both had trouble-free test firings at the SpaceX Rocket Development and Test Facility at McGregor, Texas. A launch attempt on 25 November 2013, with a planned liftoff at 22:37:00 UTC was scrubbed following a reported off-nominal condition in the liquid oxygen tank and supply lines of the first-stage booster that could not be resolved within the approximately one-hour launch window. A launch date of 28 November 2013 was announced, three days later, being the next opportunity for the launch site on Earth to be in alignment to achieve the target orbit.

=== Launch attempts ===
Attempt	Planned	Result	Turnaround	Reason	Decision point	Weather go (%)	Notes
1	25 Nov 2013, 10:37:00 pm	Hold and countdown restart	—	Launch delay	25 Nov 2013, 10:24 pm (T–00:13:00)	80%	Launch window: 22:37–23:43 UTC
2	25 Nov 2013, 10:54:00 pm	Hold and countdown restart	0 days 0 hours 17 minutes	Automatic abort	25 Nov 2013, 10:47 pm (T–00:06:11)	80%	Launch window: 22:37–23:43 UTC
3	25 Nov 2013, 11:30:00 pm	Scrubbed	0 days 0 hours 36 minutes	Off-nominal condition	25 Nov 2013, 11:26 pm (T–00:03:41)	80%	Launch window: 22:37–23:43 UTC
4	28 Nov 2013, 10:39:00 pm	Hold and countdown restart	2 days 23 hours 9 minutes	Automatic abort	28 Nov 2013, 10:38 pm (T–00:00:30)	90%	Launch window: 22:39–23:44 UTC
5	28 Nov 2013, 11:44:00 pm	Scrubbed	0 days 1 hour 5 minutes	Data review not completed	28 Nov 2013, 11:43 pm (T–00:00:48)	90%	Launch window: 22:39–23:44 UTC
6	3 Dec 2013, 10:41:00 pm	Successful launch	4 days 22 hours 57 minutes			90%	Launch window: 22:41–00:07 UTC

== See also ==
- List of Falcon 9 launches
