= NSS-6 =

Communications satellite

Coordinates: 0°N 95°E

- Mission type: Communications
- Operator: New Skies Satellites (2002-2006); SES New Skies (2006-2009); SES World Skies (2009-2011); SES (2011-present)
- COSPAR ID: 2002-057A
- SATCAT no.: 27603
- Mission duration: 15 years

Spacecraft properties
- Bus: A2100AXS
- Manufacturer: Lockheed Martin
- Launch mass: 4,700 kilograms (10,400 lb)

Start of mission
- Launch date: 17 December 2002, 23:04 UTC
- Rocket: Ariane 44L V156
- Launch site: Kourou ELA-2
- Contractor: Arianespace

Orbital parameters
- Reference system: Geocentric
- Regime: Geostationary
- Longitude: 95° East
- Perigee altitude: 35,780 kilometres (22,230 mi)
- Apogee altitude: 35,805 kilometres (22,248 mi)
- Inclination: 0.00 degrees
- Period: 23.93 hours
- Epoch: 28 October 2013, 01:04:17 UTC

NSS-6 is a communications satellite owned by SES.

NSS-6 covers the whole of Asia with six high-performance K_{u} band beams, which can deliver broadband media to small businesses, ISPs or domestic rooftop antennas in those markets. The satellite delivers Direct-To-Home power and performance, as well as significant inter-regional connectivity. High-gain uplink performance (i.e. high receiver G/T figures) allows the use of small uplink antennas and/or amplifiers.

- Manufacturer: Lockheed-Martin
- Original Orbital Location: 95° East
- Current Orbital Location: 86.85° West
- Launch date: December 17, 2002
- Launch Vehicle: Ariane 4
- Number of Transponders (physical): K_{u} band: 50
- Number of Transponders (36 MHz Equivalent): 60
- Saturated EIRP Range: K_{u} band: 44 to 55 dBW
- Frequency Band: K_{u} band uplink: 13.75 to 14.50 GHz
- Frequency Band: K_{a} band uplink: 29.5 to 30.0 GHz
- Frequency Band: K_{u} band downlink: 10.95 to 11.20 GHz, 11.45 to 11.70 GHz, 12.50 to 12.75 GHz
