= SES World Skies =

Former satellite communications company in Luxembourg

- Company type: Private company
- Industry: Telecommunications
- Founded: 2009
- Defunct: 2011
- Headquarters: Netherlands / United States
- Products: Satellite Services
- Number of employees: 169 (2007)
- Parent: SES
- Website: http://www.ses-worldskies.com/worldskies/

SES World Skies was a short lived company formed as a result of the merger between the two SES subsidiaries, SES Americom and SES New Skies. The company was merged into its parent company, SES in 2011.

== History ==
=== SES Americom ===
SES Americom traces its roots back to RCA Americom, formed in 1975. RCA Americom was notable for launching the Satcom series of satellites which were instrumental in helping early American cable TV channels gain traction. In 1986, General Electric acquired RCA and renamed the Americom unit to GE Americom. Fifteen years later, in 2001, GE sold its GE Americom unit to SES (Société Européenne des Satellites) for US$5 billion in cash and stock.

=== SES New Skies ===
In 1998, Intelsat transferred 5 of its 24 satellites to New Skies Satellites N.V., a Dutch start up company formed by Intelsat to help move Intelsat towards privatisation.

In June 2004, New Skies Satellites was sold to The Blackstone Group for US$956 million. Eighteen months later, SES Global (formerly Société Européenne des Satellites, now SES, the operators of Astra) agreed to purchase New Skies from Blackstone for US$1.16 billion.

In September 2006, the company name was changed from New Skies Satellites to SES New Skies.

=== Internal mergers ===
In September 2009, SES New Skies and SES Americom were merged to form SES World Skies.

In September 2011, SES World Skies and SES Astra were merged into SES to streamline operations under a single management system.

== See also ==
- SES
- SES Americom
- SES Astra
- SES Sirius
- List of SES satellites
- List of broadcast satellites
