= Ku band =

Range of radio frequencies from 11-20 GHz

IEEE K_{u} band
- Frequency range: 12–18 GHz
- Wavelength range: 2.5–1.67 cm
- Related bands: J (NATO); SHF (ITU)

The K_{u} band (/ˌkeɪˈjuː/) is the portion of the electromagnetic spectrum in the microwave range of frequencies from 12 to 18 gigahertz (GHz). The symbol is short for "K-under" (originally German: Kurz-unten), because it is the lower part of the original NATO K band, which was split into three bands (K_{u}, K, and K_{a}) because of the presence of the atmospheric water vapor resonance peak at 22.24 GHz, (1.35 cm) which made the center unusable for long range transmission. In radar applications, it ranges from 12 to 18 GHz according to the formal definition of radar frequency band nomenclature in IEEE Standard 521–2002.

K_{u} band is primarily used for satellite communications, most notably the downlink used by direct broadcast satellites to broadcast satellite television, and for specific applications such as NASA's Tracking Data Relay Satellite used for International Space Station (ISS) communications and SpaceX Starlink satellites. K_{u} band satellites are also used for backhauls and particularly for satellite from remote locations back to a television network's studio for editing and broadcasting. The band is split by the International Telecommunication Union (ITU) into multiple segments that vary by geographical region. NBC was the first television network to uplink a majority of its affiliate feeds via K_{u} band in 1983.

Some frequencies in this radio band are employed in radar guns used by law enforcement to detect vehicles speeding, especially in Europe.

== Segments and regions ==
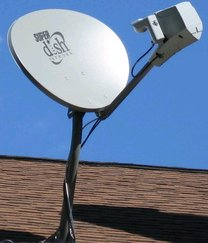
One use of the band is direct-broadcast satellite television. A satellite dish on a residence, which receives satellite television channels over a K_{u} band microwave beam from a broadcast communications satellite in a geostationary orbit 35,700 kilometres (22,000 miles) above the Earth.

=== America ===
Segments in most of North and South America are represented by ITU Region 2 from 11.7 to 12.2 GHz (local oscillator frequency (LOF) 10.75 to 11.25 GHz), allocated to the FSS (fixed satellite service), uplink from 14.0 to 14.5 GHz. There are more than 22 FSS K_{u} band satellites orbiting over North America, each carrying 12 to 48 transponders, 20 to 120 watts per transponder, and requiring a 0.8-m to 1.5-m antenna for clear reception.

The 12.2 to 12.7 GHz (LOF 11.25 to 11.75 GHz) segment is allocated to the BSS (broadcasting satellite service). BSS (DBS direct broadcast satellites) normally carry 16 to 32 transponders of 27 MHz bandwidth running at 100 to 240 watts of power, allowing the use of receiver antennas as small as 18 inches (450 mm).

=== Europe and Africa ===
Segments in those regions are represented by ITU Region 1, and they are the 11.45 to 11.7 and 12.5 to 12.75 GHz bands are allocated to the FSS (fixed satellite service, uplink 14.0 to 14.5 GHz). In Europe K_{u} band is used from 10.7 to 12.75 GHz (LOF Low 9.75 GHz, LOF High 10.6 GHz) for direct broadcast satellite services such as those carried by the Astra satellites. The 11.7 to 12.5 GHz segment is allocated to the BSS (broadcasting satellite service).

=== Australia ===
Australia is part of ITU Region 3 and the Australian regulatory environment provides a class license that covers downlinking from 11.70 GHz to 12.75 GHz and uplinking from 14.0 GHz to 14.5 GHz.

=== Indonesia ===
The ITU has categorized Indonesia as Region P, countries with very high rain precipitation. This statement has made many people unsure about using K_{u}-band (11 – 18 GHz) in Indonesia. Using frequencies higher than 10 GHz in a heavy rain area usually gives poor results. This problem can be solved by using an appropriate link budget when designing the wireless communication link. Higher power can overcome the loss to rain fade.

Measurements of rain attenuation in Indonesia have been done for satellite communication links in Padang, Cibinong, Surabaya and Bandung. The DAH Model for rain attenuation prediction is valid for Indonesia, as is the ITU model. The DAH model has become an ITU recommendation since 2001 (Recommendation No. ITU-R P.618-7). This model can create a 99.7% available link so that K_{u}-band can be applied in Indonesia.

Use of the K_{u}-band for satellite communications in tropical regions like Indonesia is becoming more frequent. Several satellites above Indonesia have K_{u}-band transponders, and even K_{a} band transponders. NSS 6, launched in December 2002 and positioned at 95° East, contains only K_{u}-band transponders with a footprint on Indonesia (Sumatra, Java, Borneo, Celebes, Bali, Nusa Tenggara, Moluccas). NSS 6 is intended to be replaced by SES-12 at the same location, which launched in June 2018 and carries 54 K_{u}-band transponders. The IPSTAR 1 satellite, launched in 2004 also uses K_{u} band footprints. Other satellites that provides K_{u} band covers Indonesia are MEASAT-3b, JCSAT-4B, AsiaSat 5, ST-2, Chinasat 11, Koreasat 8/ABS-2, SES-8, SES-9, Telkom-3S, and Nusantara Satu.

=== Others ===
Other ITU allocations have been made within the K_{u} band to the fixed service (microwave towers), radio astronomy service, space research service, mobile service, mobile satellite service, radiolocation service (radar), amateur radio service, and radionavigation. However, not all of these services are actually operating in this band and others are only minor users.

== Advantages ==
Compared with C-band, K_{u} band is not similarly restricted in power to avoid interference with terrestrial microwave systems, and the power of its uplinks and downlinks can be increased. This higher power also translates into smaller receiving dishes and points out a generalization between a satellite's transmission and a dish's size. As the power increases, the size of an antenna's dish will decrease. This is because the purpose of the dish element of the antenna is to collect the incident waves over an area and focus them all onto the antenna's actual receiving element, mounted in front of the dish (and pointed back towards its face); if the waves are more intense, fewer of them need to be collected to achieve the same intensity at the receiving element.

A major attraction of the band over lower frequency microwave bands is that the shorter wavelengths allow sufficient angular resolution to separate the signals of different communication satellites to be achieved with smaller terrestrial parabolic antennas. From the Rayleigh criterion, the diameter of a parabolic dish required to create a radiation pattern with a given angular beamwidth (gain) is proportional to the wavelength, and thus inversely proportional to the frequency. At 12 GHz a 1-meter dish is capable of focusing on one satellite while sufficiently rejecting the signal from another satellite only 2 degrees away. This is important because satellites in FSS (fixed satellite service) service (11.7-12.2 GHz in the U.S.) are only 2 degrees apart. At 4 GHz (C-band) a 3-meter dish is required to achieve this narrow angular resolution. Note the inverse linear correlation between dish size and frequency. For K_{u} satellites in DBS (direct broadcast satellite) service (12.2-12.7 GHz in the U.S.) dishes much smaller than 1-meter can be used because those satellites are spaced 9 degrees apart. As power levels on both C and K_{u} band satellites have increased over the years, dish beam-width has become much more critical than gain.

The K_{u} band also offers a user more flexibility. A smaller dish size and a K_{u} band system's freedom from terrestrial operations simplifies finding a suitable dish site. For the end users K_{u} band is generally cheaper and enables smaller antennas (both because of the higher frequency and a more focused beam). K_{u} band is also less vulnerable to rain fade than the K_{a} band frequency spectrum.

== Disadvantages ==
There are, however, some disadvantages of the K_{u} band system. Around 10 GHz is the absorption peak due to orientation relaxation of molecules in liquid water. Above 10 GHz, Mie scattering takes over. The effect is a noticeable degradation, commonly known as rain fade, during heavy rain (100 mm/h). This problem can be mitigated by transmitting a higher powered signal from the satellite to compensate. Therefore, the K_{u} band satellites typically require considerably more power to transmit than the C-band satellites.

Another weather-caused degradation called "snow fade" is not specific to the K_{u} band. It is due to snow or ice accumulation on a dish significantly altering its focal point.

The satellite operator's Earth station antenna requires more accurate position control when operating at K_{u} band due to its much narrower beam focus compared to C band for a dish of a given size. Position feedback accuracies are higher and the antenna may require a closed loop control system to maintain position under wind loading of the dish surface.

== See also ==
- Multifunction Advanced Data Link
