= StarSat =

South African direct broadcast satellite television service

On Digital Media
- Trade name: StarSat; TopTV (previously)
- Type: Public
- Industry: Satellite television
- Founded: 1 May 2010; 16 years ago
- Headquarters: Block C, Riverview Office Park, Halfway Gardens x, 100 Bekker Road, Midrand, Gauteng, South Africa
- Products: Direct broadcast satellite, Pay-TV
- Parent: StarTimes
- Website: www.starsat.co.za

StarSat (formerly TopTV until 31 October 2013) was a South African direct broadcast satellite television service that began broadcasting on 1 May 2010. StarSat was operated by On Digital Media, who were granted a pay-TV license by ICASA in September 2007. On Digital Media is currently 20% owned by Luxembourgish satellite operator SES and 20% owned by Chinese company StarTimes. StarSat's service was aimed at the LSM 6-9 demographic, targeting middle class viewers.

== History ==
Previous logo as TopTV

On Digital Media (Pty) Ltd launched TopTV on 1 May 2010.

On 30 April 2013, shareholders of On Digital Media voted to approve China-based company StarTimes taking over a 20% share of ODM. By doing so, StarTimes effectively acquired a 65% economic interest in ODM. The vote also included adoption of a business rescue plan.

TopTV was officially rebranded as StarSat on 31 October 2013. The new packages and channels associated with the new brand were made available on 1 December 2013.

When Starsat's broadcasting licence expired on 8 July 2024, with Starsat having failed to submit an application to renew its licence, the regulator, the Independent Communications Authority of South Africa (ICASA) gave StarSat until 18 September to shut its services down and to advise its customers and suppliers accordingly.

On 2 October 2024, when Starsat ignored this deadline, ICASA and law enforcement officials raided the StarSat premises and confiscated the broadcaster's broadcasting equipment.

The matters remains unresolved, with the broadcaster having promised to challenge the action in court, but ICASA spokesperson Zanele Ntuli stating that the regulator was unaware of official filings.

== Broadcast and reception ==
StarSat services were broadcast via satellite, using the SES-5 satellite at the 5° east orbital position, and 3 of the six 36 MHz transponders in the "Sub Saharan Africa Ku-band" beam providing coverage of the whole sub-Saharan Africa region. Transmissions were in the DVB-S2 MPEG-4 digital TV format with reception using a simple set-top box and with the Combo3 PVR decoder launched in 2011.

Conax was used as conditional access system.

== Channels ==
Channels from the Satellite DTH consisted of seven packages Smart and Super and Special and Global and French and Indian and Chinese.

Channel Name	Channel Number
ST GUIDE FRENCH	002
ST GUIDE ENGLISH	99
ST MOVIES PLUS	100
ST MOVIES	101
ST NOLLYWOOD PLUS	102
ST RISE	120
ST NOVELA E W	127
ST NOVELA E	127
ST NOVELA E PLUS	128
ST ZONE	129
ST SINO DRAMA	130
ST KUNGFU	155
ST REMBO PLUS	166
ST NOLLYWOOD	131
ST SPORTS FOCUS	240
ST SPORTS ARENA	241
ST SPORTS LIFE	243
ST BETA SPORTS	244
ST WORLD FOOTBALL	245
ST SPORTS PREMIUM	246
ST ADEPA	247
ST KIDS	300
ST TOONS	310
ST KIDS PLUS	311
ST RnB	321
ST KASI MUSIC	322
ST NAIJA	324
ST GOSPEL	360
ST SWAHILI	400
ST BONGO	401
ST SWAHILI PLUS	402
ST DADIN KOWA	404
ST YORÙBÁ	412
ST GANZA	460
ST REMBO	484
ST MAKULA	492
ST MAKULA KIKA	493
ST AM'MOBI	527
ST AFRIK	612
ST NOVELA F PLUS	615
ST NOLLYWOOD F	616
ST NOVELA F	617
ST CHINESE HOMELAND	800
ST NOVELA P	881
ST MANIA	957

== See also ==
- Astra 4A broadcasting satellite
- Astra 5°E orbital position
- SES satellite operator
- Astra satellite family
- MX1
