= Sirius (satellite) =

Set of telecommunications satellites

Sirius was a constellation of communications satellites operated at 5.0° East in geostationary orbit (GEO) by NSAB (later SES Sirius, and now a non-autonomous part of SES, owner and operator of the Astra satellites). They carried digital satellite television to the countries of Scandinavia, Baltic states, Eastern Europe and Africa, including the Viasat pay TV system, along with several pay TV packages for Eastern Europe, the TopTV package for Africa, a number of Ukrainian channels and the national Latvian and Lithuanian channel service free-to-air.

== Satellites ==
=== Sirius 4 ===
A fourth satellite, Sirius 4, was ordered in 2005 and launched at 22:39:47 UTC on 17 November 2007. It carries 52 active Ku-band transponders and two active Ka-band transponders. Sirius 4 was built by Lockheed Martin Space Systems based upon the A2100AX design.

Among the services carried are Viasat and Viasat Ukraine which has used the Sirius satellites for their digital platform since its launch.

Sirius 4 was renamed to Astra 4A in June 2010, when the SES took full ownership and control of SES Sirius.

=== Sirius 5 ===
Sirius 5 was the original name of the SES-5 satellite. SES-5 that was launched in July 2012 and is now co-located with Astra 4A (Sirius 4) at 5.0° East. This satellite provides a similar European and African coverage as Astra 4A. When ordered by the SES Sirius AB of Sweden in October 2008, the name of the satellite was Sirius 5. SES Sirius was acquired by SES in 2010 and the company was named SES Astra (a subsidiary of SES). This led to the satellite being renamed to Astra 4B in 2010. The name was changed to SES-5 in 2011.

== Retired satellites ==
=== Sirius 1 ===
Sirius 1 (later Sirius W) was purchased from British Sky Broadcasting after Sky Television's merger with British Satellite Broadcasting (BSB) (the merger was conducted on Sky's terms and BSB's satellites were sold in favour of Sky's leased Astra satellite operations). The satellite had previously operated as Marcopolo 1. It operated at 5.0° East from 1994 until 2000, when it was moved to 13.0° West. It operated here before being moved to a graveyard orbit in 2003.

=== Sirius 2 ===
Sirius 2 was manufactured by Aérospatiale and launched from Kourou on 12 November 1997 to replace the Tele-X satellite. It is of the model Spacebus 3000B2 and has 32 K_{u}-band transponders with beams targeting both the Nordic region and all of Europe.

It was moved to 31.5° East (0°N 31.5°E) and renamed Astra 5A on 29 April 2008. The Astra 5A satellite mission ended on 16 January 2009 due to an abnormal condition with the spacecraft.

=== Sirius 3 ===
Sirius 3 was stationed at 51.2° East at the end if its lifetime (0°N 51.2°E) in an inclined orbit. Sirius 3 was leased to SES immediately after its launch on 5 October 1998 for a period of 12 months (after which it was moved to its original destination of 5.0° East) to provide capacity at 28.2° East and to back up Astra 2A, pending the launch of Astra 2B on 14 September 2000. Satellite was retired in 2015 and moved to a graveyard orbit.

== Sirius Satellite Radio ==
The Sirius satellites are not the satellites used for the American Sirius Satellite Radio service, whose satellites are named Radiosat 1-4 due to being launched after the Sirius fleet of satellites.
