= Satmed =

The Satmed logo

Satmed (or SATMED) is a satellite-based eHealth communications platform, in particular for provision of eHealth to remote, resource-poor areas of emerging and developing countries. It aims to provide services to non-governmental organisations (NGOs) that provide healthcare, education or health management services, governmental organisations that support regional development programs and humanitarian operations, and institutions such as medical universities, hospitals and health management institutions.

Satmed was formed to address the problem that in many remote regions of developing countries there is not only a significant lack of facilities and trained health professionals, but also no communications infrastructure to remote villages (and so no access to eHealth), or even a reliable electricity supply. Satellite broadband technology is often the only solution, and one that can provide a fast connection over a vast coverage area. Satmed provides the satellite connectivity and integrates a wide range of capabilities in a single platform, including access and storage of patient e-records, medical imaging, virtual consultation, e-learning, remote monitoring and e-health management and video conferencing..The cloud-based system reduces the need for expensive on-the-ground ICT resources and their maintenance.

Initially in a pilot phase for the design and evolution of the platform (developed by SES TechCom Services, a subsidiary of satellite operator SES and Berlin-based telemedicine technology company, e-Medical Communication), Satmed deployed satellite terminal equipment and the software platform to partner organisations, including NGOs, hospitals, medical universities, and other health care providers active in areas of Bangladesh, Benin, Eritrea, Guinea, Niger, the Philippines, and Sierra Leone. The pilot phase was funded by the Luxembourg government and the medical arm of Emergency.lu, the disaster recovery communications platform created to improve the rapid response capabilities of rescue teams in areas hit by severe natural or human-made catastrophes, itself a public-private partnership between Luxembourg's Ministry of Foreign Affairs, SES, HITEC Luxembourg S.A. and Luxembourg Air Ambulance S.A., with a budget 4.5million euros.

The contract for SES to provide the satellite-enabled cloud-based platform for the Luxembourg Government was expanded and extended in 2017 and again in 2021, to provide the service until 2024.

== Services ==
Satmed can provide:

- Basic ICT infrastructure to key hospitals (for patient records, registration, medical surveillance)
- Digital network between key hospitals (for pooling medical data and sharing medical knowledge)
- Data collection from remote health centres (for health statistics and epidemiology studies)
- Links between remote health centres and main hospitals in capital cities (for consultation and training)

== History ==
The Satmed platform was conceived by SES TechCom, the engineering services division of satellite operator SES, and supported by the Luxembourg Government and the Minister for Cooperation and Humanitarian Action, and five Non-Governmental Organisations (NGO) – Archemed, Fondation Follereau, Friendship, German Doctors and Médecins Sans Frontières. The European ESTHER alliance, a Europe-wide network of Governments for the networking of health professionals and associations in their fight against AIDS, is also involved in the project through its German branch.

In September, SES announced that it had become a member of the Clinton Global Initiative (CGI), and at the 2014 CGI Annual Meeting announced its Commitment to Action in the form of the Satmed platform.

The Satmed pilot phase was originally intended to start in mid-2015, but the outbreak of Ebola in West Africa meant that programme was brought forward and Satmed was first deployed in Sierra Leone in support of the fight against Ebola in November 2014.

In September 2016, the Satmed healthcare system won the 'Changing Lives' category in the VSAT Stellar Awards, presented as part of the VSAT Global conference in London.

In April 2017, the Luxembourg Ministry of Foreign and European Affairs extended the contract with SES to maintain, support, and continue to develop the Satmed platform until 2020, extending the provision of satellite connectivity over Africa, the Philippines and Bangladesh.

In April 2020, the Government of Luxembourg made access to the Satmed platform available free of charge for healthcare professionals of selected health organisations, to fight the COVID-19 pandemic. Existing Satmed projects in Sierra Leone and Bangladesh have proved instrumental in detection and treatment of COVID-19 in geographically isolated regions of those countries.

In March 2021, the Luxembourg government further extended the contract with SES to provide the Satmed satellite platform to 2024, with a €6.5 billion budget and plans for new functionalities, deployments and partnerships with both more NGOs and supranational organisations to provide regional or cross-country support.

In June 2022, Satmed was awarded the World Summit on the Information Society (WSIS) prize for International and Regional Cooperation.

== Projects ==
=== Bangladesh ===
In March 2016, Satmed deployed VSATs on floating hospital ships to provide healthcare services to the 'Char dwellers' on sediment islands in the rivers of Bangladesh. Three ships belonging to NGO, Friendship were equipped – Lifebuoy Friendship Hospital, Emirates Friendship Hospital, and Rongdhonu Friendship Hospital (formerly Rainbow Warrior II).

Connectivity by satellite (otherwise unavailable to the islands) enables staff to share medical records across the three hospital ships, to synchronise information at the headquarters in Dhaka, and to use Satmed's e-learning tools in the Friendship teaching centre.

=== Benin ===
Deployed in June 2015, the Satmed platform at Maternité Hospital built in by Fondation Follereau Luxembourg (FFL) in the village of Ahozonnoude, Benin provides communications between the maternity hospital in Ahozonnoude, the hospital in capital Cotonou and a third hospital unit in Allada. For remote consultation and monitoring - the only effective communication link between the three units, since the routes are often inaccessible due to flooding during the rainy season. Satmed can also deliver remote online training, enabling midwives and health workers to have their performance monitored and evaluated to improve healthcare standards. FFL intends to expand the platform to other health centres in the region to create a network for sharing medical information and expertise.

In June 2016, a second Satmed platform was deployed at Centre de Dépistage et de traitement de l'Ulcère de Buruli in Allada, Benin, for FFL to provide communications with doctors and medical experts around the world, access online training tools, establish video conferencing, data collection and analysis, and raise awareness of tropical diseases.

=== Eritrea ===
The NGO, Archemed – Doctors for Children in Need, based in Möhnesee, Germany. has been active in Eritrea for over ten years providing visiting teams of doctors, nurses and technicians coordinated by permanent local project partners, with a focus on child health and training of students and medical staff. Satmed has been deployed in the Asmara Medical School and Orotta Referral Hospital (both in the capital city Asmara and the only institutes of advanced secondary and tertiary care in Eritrea) and in provincial hospitals in Keren and Barentu.

The Satmed system is primarily used for teaching students (with a focus on mother-child care), to provide a 'virtual clinic' to connect local and Archemed doctors in Asmara and the provinces, with hands-on consultations and training in surgery (including cardiac surgery) intensive care, oncology, infectious diseases, etc., and for archiving and sharing medical images for pathology across the organisation.

=== Niger ===
In April 2016, the Satmed platform was deployed at the CURE Hôpital des Enfants au Niger in Niamey, Niger, which specialises in the care of children with surgically correctable conditions, and has 70 staff each year providing nearly 2,000 consultations (at the hospital and in mobile clinics) and around 700 surgeries, with patients from throughout Niger and neighbouring West African countries such as Mali, Nigeria, and Burkina Faso.

The biggest challenge facing CURE in Niger is the lack of infrastructure, and without reliable electricity, internet connection and water, access to healthcare throughout the country remains very limited. The Satmed system provides communication between CURE Niger staff and national and international doctors to receive medical counselling, remote diagnosis of patients by experts across the World, online training for doctors and nurses to improve their knowledge, and easy access to necessary information via the internet, enhancing the healthcare provided to rural and remote regions in Niger.

=== Philippines ===
Opened in 2005, in conjunction with German Doctors, the Buda Community Healthcare Centre on the island of Mindanao in The Philippines is the only medical point of contact for more than 200,000 people living in remote villages within 100 km of the centre. Satmed has been deployed at the centre as a mobile health information management system to collect and analyse patient data. The initial focus is on using Satmed to support rolling clinics - medical teams visit local villages on a regular basis to treat patients on-site and to offer prevention measures and health monitoring. Portable devices such as tablets are used to collect patient data, which is then processed, aggregated and synchronised on Satmed's cloud platform. Satmed also provides communication with doctors and medical experts around the world via video conferencing, and training of local medical professionals. In addition, Satmed's text messaging facility allows doctors to keep tabs on large group of patients living in remote villages whose main form of contact with the outside world is via mobile phones.

=== Sierra Leone ===
During the Ebola outbreak in West Africa in 2014, Satmed, in conjunction with German Doctors brought internet access to the Outpatient Clinic of Serabu Hospital in Bo District in Sierra Leone. The hospital provides health services to six chiefdoms with an estimated population of 60,000-70,000 and the clinic sees approximately 100 patients per day but is geographically isolated with no access to higher level secondary care. Satmed enabled the community to stay in contact with the medical staff, to gather data about the disease spread, to implement prevention measures, and to provide e-learning teaching sessions and remote consultancy.

== See also ==
- eHealth
- Telemedicine
- SES S.A.
- Médecins Sans Frontières
- German Doctors for Developing Countries
