= Hosted payload =

A hosted payload is a module attached to a commercial satellite with communications circuitry that operates independently of the main spacecraft but which shares the satellite's power supply and transponders. The concept has been also been referred to as "piggybacking" or "hitchhiking."

== Description ==
Hosted payloads are used most often by government agencies seeking to have communications capability in orbit without having to pay the cost of building and launching an entire government-owned satellite. For example, within the United States, the Department of Defense has used three commercially hosted payloads since 2009. Using a hosted payload on a commercial satellite can reduce both the expense and time required to get communications and other technologies into space.

However, because some government agencies desire to own and control entire satellite platforms, hosted payloads have not been widely accepted by government space planners, despite the fact that a large proportion of government satellite communications is over commercially owned and operated satellites. Hosted payloads give customers the ability to own and control a portion of a satellite's capacity. In 2007, the US Department of Defense projected that satellite demand for the next 10–13 years would increase much more rapidly than the government could build and launch its own satellite systems, making hosted payloads on commercial satellites an attractive alternative.

Hosted payloads can support a variety of missions. These include Space Situational Awareness (SSA) such as collision avoidance, debris monitoring, nuclear detection and still imagery; and data collection for hyper-spectral sounding, ocean color analysis, ozone mapping, and weather tracking; as well as communications; and research and development.

A hosted payload's schedule usually takes from start date to launch around 30 months. This launch time is actually an advantage compared to the longer launch date of typical government satellite programs. Hosted Payload's also allow the government a way to reduce a number of risks when it comes to program funding, launch delays and operational concerns.

As of March 2010, eighteen commercial satellites that had the capability to carry U.S. government piggyback payloads have been placed into production, but only one is expected to host a payload because the government has yet to have a policy on the matter.

The role of hosted payloads in the government has been increasing over the years. In 2007, Department of Defense's projected satellite demand for the next 10–13 years shows a rise in satellite demand but a gap in actual capability. Hosted Payloads is a potential answer to meet the demand of satellites through their ability to provide rapid and dependable access into space.

In December 2010, mobile satellite provider, Inmarsat, announced plans to construct three Ka-band satellites to provide bandwidth to commercial military customers. One of the Global Xpress satellites, to be built by Boeing Defense, Space & Security, will carry a hosted payload built by Inmarsat. It is expected to be leased by a customer of the U.S. Department of Defense.

A potential area of development for hosted payloads is in earth observation missions. There are countless environmental monitoring missions, both old and new, which should be launched in the coming years.

== IRIS ==
An example of such was launched in November 2009 called the Intelsat 14. The Internet Routing in Space (IRIS) program, according to Intelsat, its provider of fixed satellites, was a "technology demonstrator" hosted payload. According to Intelsat's press release and Steve Boutelle, Vice President, Cisco Systems Global Government Solutions Group, the IRIS payload supports network services for voice, video and data communications, enabling U.S. military units and allied forces to communicate with one another using Internet Protocol (IP) and existing ground equipment. In January 2010, Cisco completed the first-ever software upgrade of an IP router aboard a commercial satellite while in orbit.

== Australian Defence Force/ ILS ==
International Launch Services teamed up with Intelsat to launch the Intelsat 22 satellite for Intelsat on a Proton rocket. In April 2009, Intelsat announced an expansion agreement for hosted payload services with the Australian Defence Force (ADF). The Intelsat 22 satellite was built by Boeing Space and Intelligence Systems and was launched in the first half of 2012. The ADF purchased the remainder of the specialized ultra-high frequency (UHF) communications payload that Intelsat is integrating within its Intelsat 22 satellite. The Intelsat 22 satellite was promoted to provide optimal coverage for commercial networks, mobility and defense-related applications.

== United States ==
With budget concerns facing the US space program, hosted payloads were examined in 2011 as a more cost-effective alternative to traditional space launches into orbit. This led to development of knowledge bases to further promote hosted payloads by the space industry.

An example of a hosted payload is the U.S. Coast Guard's Nationwide Automatic Identification System (NAIS) Project. According to the Office of Space Commerce, NAIS is designed to enhance the current Automatic Identification System (AIS), which monitors vessel traffic for maritime domain awareness. The payload is testing the feasibility and effectiveness of AIS message reception and reporting from space for ship tracking and other navigational activities. The Coast Guard paid a commercial satellite operator (Orbcomm) to develop and integrate the NAIS demonstration payload on one commercial satellite. Sensing a business opportunity, the company used its own funds to add the same capability to five additional satellites. Other customers of a satellite-based AIS data service could include the Navy, NOAA, insurance firms, and trucking companies.

The U.S. Air Force's Commercially Hosted Infrared Payload (CHIRP) flight demonstration program is a wide field-of-view, passive infrared sensor on a commercial GEO (SES-2) launched by SES in 2011. The experiment supports an infrared sensor system development and is essential to reducing technology risk for the Third Generation Infrared Surveillance (3GIRS) system. The Air Force is expected save costs by flying this mission via hosted payload. According to the Office of Space Commerce, it would cost approximately $500 million to launch a dedicated free flyer to satisfy 100% of the technical questions associated with the experiment. The hosted payload ended up costing $65 million and should satisfy 80% of the technical questions.

In 2013, NASA selected Global-scale Observations of the Limb and Disk (GOLD) as an Explorer Mission of Opportunity. GOLD was launched in 2018 as a hosted payload on the SES-14 communications satellite manufactured by Airbus Defence and Space. GOLD is a far ultraviolet (FUV) imaging spectrometer which studies the Earth's upper atmosphere.

SES's Astra 5B and SES-5 satellites (launched March 2014 and July 2012, respectively) carry European Geostationary Navigation Overlay Service (EGNOS) payloads, a supplementary network to the GPS and GLONASS navigation systems.

The Federal Aviation Administration (FAA) has employed a hosted payload approach to set its own Wide Area Augmentation System (WAAS) payloads on a succession of commercial geosynchronous satellites, such as the SES-15 satellite launched in May 2017.
