= Astra 1E =

Communications satellite

- Mission type: Communications
- Operator: SES
- COSPAR ID: 1995-055A
- SATCAT no.: 23686
- Website: https://www.ses.com/
- Mission duration: 15 years (planned); 19 years, 8 months (achieved)

Spacecraft properties
- Spacecraft type: Boeing 601
- Bus: HS-601
- Manufacturer: Hughes Space and Communications
- Launch mass: 3,014 kg (6,645 lb)
- Power: 4.7 kW

Start of mission
- Launch date: 19 October 1995, 00:38:00 UTC
- Rocket: Ariane 42L H10-3 (V79)
- Launch site: Centre Spatial Guyanais, ELA-2
- Contractor: Arianespace
- Entered service: December 1995

End of mission
- Disposal: Graveyard orbit
- Deactivated: June 2015

Orbital parameters
- Reference system: Geocentric orbit
- Regime: Geostationary orbit
- Longitude: 19.2° East (1995-2007); 23.5° East (2007-2010); 5.2° East (2010-2012); 108.2° East (2012-2014); 31.5° East (2014-2015); 23° East (2015)

Transponders
- Band: 18 Ku-band
- Bandwidth: FSS: 26 Mhz; BSS: 33 MHz
- Coverage area: Europe

Astra 1E is one of the Astra communications satellites in geostationary orbit owned and operated by SES. It was launched in October 1995 to the Astra 19.2°E orbital slot initially to provide digital television and radio for direct-to-home (DTH) across Europe.

Astra 1E was the first Astra satellite to be dedicated to digital television broadcasting and it carried many of the first digital television channels from networks broadcasting to France, Germany, and other European countries in the 1990s.

The satellite originally provided two broadcast beams, of horizontal and vertical polarisation, for Fixed Service Satellite (FSS) (10.70-10.95 GHz) and for Broadcast Satellite Service (BSS) (11.70-12.10 GHz) frequency bands. The FSS beams provide footprints that cover essentially the same area of Europe – northern, central and eastern Europe, including Spain and northern Italy – while the BSS horizontal beam excludes Spain and extends further east, and the BSS vertical beam includes Spain and more of southern Italy but does not extend so far east. Within the footprints, television signals are usually received with a 60–80 cm dish.

== History ==
In October 2007, following the successful deployment of Astra 1L at 19.2° East, Astra 1E was moved to Astra's new DTH orbital position, 23.5° East where it provided capacity for the transmission of new services including the ASTRA2Connect two-way satellite broadband Internet service which provides high speed internet access and Voice over IP (VoIP) without landline connection at up to 2 Mbit/s download speeds and 128 kbit/s upload using four Ku-band transponders for both forward and return paths from the user's remote terminal.

In May 2010, Astra 3B was launched to the 23.5° East position, coming into service in June 2010, at which time the services using Astra 1E were transferred to the new craft. In August 2010, Astra 1E left the 23.5° East position moving westwards, to the Astra 5°E position to provide backup for Astra 4A pending the launch of Astra 4B to that position in 2011. At 5° East, Astra 1E carried very little television traffic. Following the launch of Astra 4B (renamed to SES-5) in February 2012, Astra 1E was moved to 108.2° East, in inclined orbit and with no traffic, and then to 31.5° East in Summer 2013. It returned to 23° East in February 2015.

in June 2015, the satellite was retired and was moved into a graveyard orbit above the geostationary belt, moving 5.4° West per day.

== See also ==
- Astra 3B
- Astra 4A
- SES (operator)
- Astra satellite family
- ASTRA2Connect Internet service previously carried
