= Astra 5°E =

Group of television satellites

Coordinates: 0°N 5°E

Astra 5°E is the name for the Astra communications satellites co-located at the 5° east position in the Clarke Belt which are owned and operated by SES based in Betzdorf, Luxembourg. 5° east is one of the major TV satellite positions serving Europe (the others being at 19.2° east, 28.2° east, 13° east, and 23.5° east).

The Astra satellites at 5° east provide for services downlinking to the Nordic countries, Eastern Europe and sub-Saharan Africa in the 11.70 GHz-12.75 GHz range of the K_{u} band, and at present the Astra 4A and the SES-5 are regularly operational at this position.

Satellites at 5°E were originally operated by Swedish Space Corporation (SSC), and then Nordic Satellite AB (NSAB, itself 50% owned by SSC) before SES took full control of the position and the satellites in 2010, renaming the Sirius 4 satellite to Astra 4A and later adding its own Astra 1E to the group followed by the SES-5.

== Satellite craft in use ==
=== Current ===
- Astra 4A (previously called Sirius 4) - launched 2007
- SES-5 (previously called Astra 4B and Sirius 5) - launched 2012

=== Previous ===
- Tele-X (operated by Swedish Space Corporation) - launched 1989, retired
- Sirius 1 (operated by NSAB) - launched 1989, retired
- Sirius 2/Astra 5A (operated by NSAB) - launched 1997, failed in orbit
- Sirius 3 - launched 2007, retired
- Astra 1C - launched 1993, retired
- Astra 1E - launched 1995, retired
- Astra 2D - launched 2000, retired

== Market ==
Astra 5°E is SES' position for direct-to-home (DTH) broadcasting to Sweden, Denmark, Norway and Finland, as well as Eastern European and Baltic countries including Belarus, Bulgaria, Estonia, Latvia, Lithuania, Romania, Russia, and Ukraine, and sub-Saharan Africa.

Over 460 TV, radio and interactive channels (including 9 high-definition television stations serve over 21 million direct-to-home, SMATV and cable homes via the 5°E position. Cable distribution to head-ends, contribution links, data services, and broadband capacity are also provided

Astra 4A provides DTH coverage to multiple African markets with a dedicated K_{u} band beam from a single orbital position, which eliminates the need for dual-illumination from separate beams. This position also provides uplink and downlink within the African footprint, and inter-connectivity between Africa and Europe, so that DTH broadcasting out of Europe is available without the need for expensive fibre links.

SES-5 provides two Ku-band beams for DTH services, one for the Nordic and Baltic countries and one serving Sub-Saharan Africa. It also has C-band capacity on a global coverage beam and a hemispheric coverage for Europe, Africa and the Middle East to deliver broadband, maritime communications, GSM backhaul, and VSAT applications. SES-5 also carries a hosted L-band payload for the European Commission's European Geostationary Navigation Overlay Service (EGNOS).

== Capacity and reach ==
As of December 2019 the Astra satellites at 5° east broadcast on 121 transponders (28 C-Band, 3 Ka-band and 90 Ku-band) to 51.5 million households (34.1 million via cable, 10.7 million via IPTV and 6.7 million direct to home satellite dishes).

== History ==
The Astra 5°E orbital position was originally the Direct broadcast satellite orbital position allocated to Sweden with Swedish Satellite Corporation's Tele-X (launched 1989) the first TV satellite at this position. In 1994, Tele-X was joined by Sirius 1, bought by NSAB from BSkyB in 1993 after Sky Television's merger with British Satellite Broadcasting, and moved to 5°E from its original orbital position at 30°West as Marcopolo 1.

Sirius 1 was later joined at 5° east by Sirius 2 (1997) and then Sirius 3 (1998), with the most recent addition, Sirius 4, launched in November 2007.

Tele-X was retired to a graveyard orbit in 1998. Sirius 1 was moved to 13° west and renamed Sirius W in 2000 and retired in 2003. In 2008 Sirius 2 was moved to 31.5°E and renamed Astra 5A but in January 2009, the spacecraft suffered a failure and was withdrawn from service some four years ahead of its expected end of life. Sirius 3 is in inclined orbit at 51.2° east.

In 2000, SES bought the 50% shareholding in NSAB owned by Teracom and Tele Danmark and in 2003 increased that holding to 75%, renaming the company SES Sirius AB. In 2008 Astra acquired further shares to take its shareholding in SES Sirius to 90% and in March 2010 took full control of the company. In June 2010, the affiliate company was renamed SES Astra and the Sirius 4 satellite renamed Astra 4A. SES Astra is now a non-autonomous part of SES.

Astra 4A was originally the designation given in 2007 to just part of the Sirius 4 satellite (six transponders of the FSS Africa beam) owned and operated by SES Sirius. From June 2010, the Astra 4A designation has applied to the entire satellite.

In September 2010, Astra 1E was moved to 5° east to provide further backup for Astra 4A until the launch of SES-5 (Astra 4B). Astra 1E was originally launched to the primary Astra position of 19.2°E but, prior to its move to 5°E, since October 2007 it had been used at 23.5°E to provide additional capacity before the launch of Astra 3B to that position in May 2010.

On July 9, 2012, SES-5 was successfully launched from Baikonur in Kazakhstan and on September 17, 2012, it started commercial operations at 5°E. SES-5 was originally named Sirius 5, but renamed to Astra 4B in 2010 and then to SES-5 in 2011.

In July 2015 Astra 2D arrived, inactive, at the Astra 5°E position, moved from Astra 28.2°E where it had served all its active life (2001–2013). In October 2015, Astra 2D left this position but returned in July 2018, only to leave Astra 5°E again in January 2020 (to move to 57.2°E).

== See also ==
- SES satellite owner
- Astra satellite family
- Astra 4A
- Astra 1E
- Astra 19.2°E
- Astra 28.2°E
- Astra 23.5°E
- Astra 31.5°E
- Sirius
