= Astra 1K =

Communications satellite

- Mission type: Communications
- Operator: SES
- COSPAR ID: 2002-053A
- SATCAT no.: 27557
- Website: https://www.ses.com/
- Mission duration: 15 years (planned); Failed on orbit (DM03 failure)

Spacecraft properties
- Spacecraft type: Spacebus
- Bus: Spacebus-3000B3S
- Manufacturer: Alcatel Space
- Launch mass: 5,250 kg (11,570 lb)
- Power: 13 kW

Start of mission
- Launch date: 25 November 2002, 23:04:23 UTC
- Rocket: Proton-K / DM03
- Launch site: Baikonur, Site 81/23
- Contractor: Khrunichev State Research and Production Space Center
- Entered service: Failed on orbit (DM03 failure)

End of mission
- Disposal: Deorbited
- Decay date: 10 December 2002

Orbital parameters
- Reference system: Geocentric orbit
- Regime: Low Earth orbit Geostationary orbit (planned)
- Longitude: 19.2° East (planned)
- Perigee altitude: 142 km (88 mi)
- Apogee altitude: 288 km (179 mi)
- Inclination: 51.5°
- Period: 88.79 minutes

Transponders
- Band: 54 transponders: 52 Ku-band; 2 Ka-band
- Coverage area: Europe

Astra 1K was a communications satellite manufactured by Alcatel Space for SES. When it was launched on 25 November 2002, it was the largest civilian communications satellite ever launched, with a mass of 5,250 kg (11,570 lb). Intended to replace the Astra 1B satellite and provide backup for 1A, 1C and 1D at the Astra 19.2°E orbital position, the Blok DM3 upper stage of the Proton-K launch vehicle failed to function properly, leaving the satellite in an unusable parking orbit.

== Launch ==
Astra 1K was to be a European (Luxembourg-based) geostationary communications satellite that was launched by a Proton-K launch vehicle from Baikonur Cosmodrome at 23:04:23 UTC on 25 November 2002. However, the Blok DM3 upper stage attached to the 5,250 kg (11,570 lb), 13 kW satellite (reported to be the most massive of civilian communications satellite, with its 52 Ku-band and two Ka-band transponders to cover 1,100 channels) was miscommanded to separate after the first burn, resulting in the satellite orbiting at a very low orbit. In an effort to prevent imminent re-entry, the satellite was raised to a circular orbit at an altitude of 288 km, providing sufficient time to select the best course of action. Three options were then under consideration: a) to force its re-entry over the Pacific Ocean, b) to retrieve it by a Space Shuttle, and c) to use up all the fuel on board the satellite to move it to a geostationary orbit at 19.2° east. Although it was suggested that a separately-launched Orbital Recovery Corporation 'space tug' (then in development) might be used to take the satellite to geostationary orbit, the decision was taken in December 2002 to deorbit the satellite, resulting in a huge insurance loss and bringing into question both continued use of the Blok D series of upper stages and the "bigger is better" communications satellite philosophy. Astra 1K was intentionally de-orbited on 10 December 2002.

== Overview ==
The satellite featured frequency re-use for some of its transponders, using dual patterns coverage, one covering eastern Europe, the other covering Spain. This design was meant to cover specific markets only, in order to expand the capacity of the fleet, as frequency re-use enables more channels to be transmitted simultaneously at the same frequency, with the drawback that channels broadcast on the Spain beam wouldn't be receivable by any means (no matter how large the receiving dish would be) in the east beam and vice versa. This would have left for example the Netherlands and parts of neighbouring countries without reception of either of the beams, as the beams overlap over those countries, efficiently jamming each other.

Astra 1K also featured multiple Ka-Band capabilities, originally intended to provide an upload path for satellite Internet access services. SES later developed such a 2-way commercial satellite internet service with ASTRA2Connect (now SES Broadband), using Ku-band for upload and download paths.

== Replacement satellite ==
A replacement satellite, Astra 1KR was successfully launched in 2006.

== See also ==
- SES
- Astra
- Astra 19.2°E
- Astra 1A
- Astra 1B
- Astra 1C
- Astra 1KR
