= QuetzSat 1 =

- Mission type: Communication
- Operator: Quetzat
- COSPAR ID: 2011-054A
- SATCAT no.: 37826
- Mission duration: 15 years (planned)

Spacecraft properties
- Bus: LS-1300
- Manufacturer: Space Systems/Loral
- Launch mass: 5,514 kilograms (12,156 lb)

Start of mission
- Launch date: 29 September 2011, 18:32 UTC
- Rocket: Proton-M/Briz-M
- Launch site: Baikonur 200/39
- Contractor: ILS

Orbital parameters
- Reference system: Geocentric
- Regime: Geostationary
- Longitude: 77° West
- Perigee altitude: 35,774 kilometres (22,229 mi)
- Apogee altitude: 35,797 kilometres (22,243 mi)
- Inclination: 0.06 degrees
- Period: 1,436.04 minutes
- Epoch: 14 October 2011

Transponders
- Band: 32 Ku band

QuetzSat 1 is a Mexican high-power geostationary communications satellite which is operated by the Mexican operator QuetzSat (a joint venture of SES, formerly in its full name Société Européenne des Satellites, of Luxembourg, and Grupo Medcom of Mexico, of the Serna family) It is positioned in geostationary orbit, and located at 77° West, from where it provides direct broadcasting services to United States and a part of Mexico for Dish Mexico.

QuetzSat 1 was built by Space Systems/Loral, and is based on the LS-1300 satellite bus. It is equipped with 32 Ku band transponder and at launch it had a mass of 5,514 kilograms (12,156 lb). It has a design life of fifteen years. QuetzSat 1 is part of the SES satellite fleet.

== Launch ==
QuetzSat 1 was launched by International Launch Services using a Proton-M carrier rocket with a Briz-M upper stage from site 200 of the Baikonur Cosmodrome in Kazakhstan, at 18:32 UTC on 29 September 2011. The launch successfully placed QuetzSat 1 into a geosynchronous transfer orbit, making it the 49th comsat of the SES satellite fleet.

== Technical specs ==
- Operator: QuetzSat
- Manufacturer: Space Systems/Loral
- Purpose: Direct-broadcast satellite
- Orbital location: 77° West
- Payload: 32 Ku band transponder
- Platform: LS-1300S (expanded)
- Mass: 5,514 kg
- Spacecraft propulsion: Aerojet R-4D, 4 plasma thrusters SPT-100
- Stabilisation: 3 axis
- Lifetime: 15 years
- Also known as: 37826

== See also ==
- Dish Network
- Echostar
