= SES-2 =

Geostationary Communications satellite

- Names: AMC-5R; AMC-26; CHIRP
- Mission type: Communications
- Operator: SES
- COSPAR ID: 2011-049A
- SATCAT no.: 37809
- Website: https://www.ses.com/
- Mission duration: 15 years (planned); 14 years, 5 months, 12 days (elapsed)

Spacecraft properties
- Spacecraft: AMC-5R
- Spacecraft type: GEOStar-2
- Bus: Star-2.4
- Manufacturer: Orbital Sciences Corporation
- Launch mass: 3,200 kg (7,100 lb)
- Power: 5 kW

Start of mission
- Launch date: 21 September 2011, 21:38:00 UTC
- Rocket: Ariane 5 ECA (VA204)
- Launch site: Centre Spatial Guyanais, ELA-3
- Contractor: Arianespace
- Entered service: 27 October 2011

Orbital parameters
- Reference system: Geocentric orbit
- Regime: Geostationary orbit
- Longitude: 87° West

Transponders
- Band: 48 transponders: 24 C-band; 24 Ku-band
- Bandwidth: 36 MHz
- Coverage area: North America, Latin America, Caribbean

SES-2 is a communications satellite operated by SES. It was launched alongside the Arabsat-5C satellite.

== Spacecraft ==
The platform is home to the first hosted payload, a mechanism by which governmental entities can fly modules on commercial satellites. It carries 24 C-band and 24 Ku-band transponders of 36 MHz capacity. Six of the channels in each band can be cross-strapped to the opposite band, enabling new service capability. The SES-2 satellite generates approximately 5.0 kW of payload power and has two 2.3 m deployable reflectors. It also carries the Commercially Hosted InfraRed Payload (CHIRP) for the U.S. Air Force. CHIRP demonstrates infrared detection technologies from geostationary orbit for missile warning applications.

== Launch ==
SES-2, a communications satellite, was launched on 21 September 2011 from Centre Spatial Guyanais, Kourou at 21:38:00 UTC by an Ariane 5 ECA launch vehicle. The satellite weighed 3200 kg and join four other Orbital Sciences-built spacecraft in the SES fleet to provide service for North America, Latin America and the Caribbean. It is stationed at 87° West longitude.

== Mission ==
It entered into commercial service on 27 October 2011 in the 87° West orbital location. This satellite is used to transmit the updating Othernet archive to the small lightweight Othernet receiver stations designed to eventually provide news, weather, educational and other media to communities with no access to the internet.
