= Astra 1F =

Communications satellite

- Mission type: Communications
- Operator: SES
- COSPAR ID: 1996-021A
- SATCAT no.: 23842
- Website: https://www.ses.com/
- Mission duration: 15 years (planned); 24 years, 7 months (achieved)

Spacecraft properties
- Spacecraft type: Boeing 601
- Bus: HS-601
- Manufacturer: Hughes Space and Communications
- Launch mass: 3,010 kg (6,640 lb)
- Power: 4.7 kW

Start of mission
- Launch date: 8 April 1996, 23:09:01 UTC
- Rocket: Proton-K / DM-2M
- Launch site: Baikonur, Site 81/23
- Contractor: Khrunichev State Research and Production Space Center
- Entered service: June 1996

End of mission
- Disposal: Graveyard orbit
- Deactivated: November 2020

Orbital parameters
- Reference system: Geocentric orbit
- Regime: Geostationary orbit
- Longitude: Astra 19.2°E (1996-2009); 51°E (2009-20100; 55°E (2010-2015); 44.5°E (2015-2020)

Transponders
- Band: 16 Ku-band
- Bandwidth: FSS: 26 Mhz; BSS: 33 MHz
- Coverage area: Europe

Astra 1F is one of the Astra communications satellites in geostationary orbit owned and operated by SES. It was launched in April 1996 to the Astra 19.2°E orbital slot initially to provide digital television and radio for direct-to-home (DTH) across Europe.

The satellite originally provided two broadcast beams, of horizontal and vertical polarisation, for Fixed Service Satellite (FSS) (10.70-10.95 GHz) and for Broadcast Satellite Service (BSS) (11.70-12.10 GHz) frequency bands. The FSS beams provide footprints that cover essentially the same area of Europe – northern, central and eastern Europe, including Spain and northern Italy – while the BSS horizontal beam excludes Spain and extends further east, and the BSS vertical beam includes Spain and more of southern Italy but does not extend so far east. Within the footprints, television signals are usually received with a 60–80 cm dish.

== See also ==
- Astra satellite family
- SES (operator)
- SES Broadband Internet service
