= Hans Tietmeyer =

German economist (1931–2016)

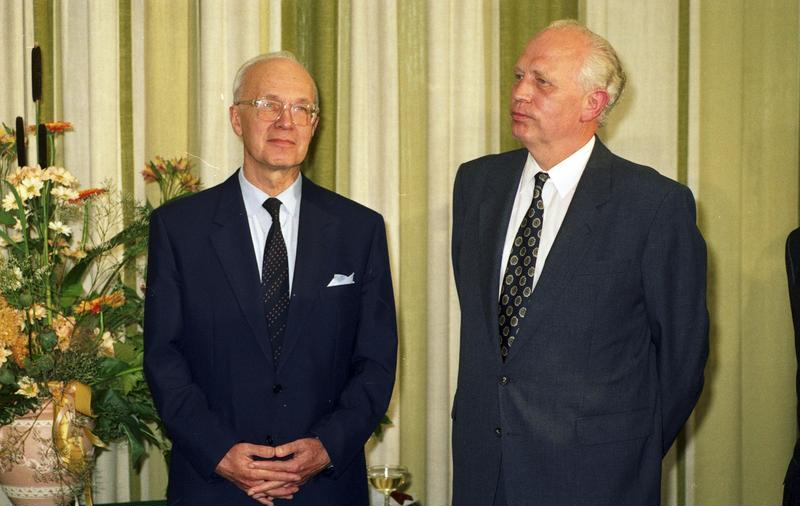
- Hans Tietmeyer (right) and Helmut Schlesinger

6th President of the German Bundesbank
- In office 1 October 1993 – 31 August 1999
- Preceded by: Helmut Schlesinger
- Succeeded by: Ernst Welteke

Personal details
- Born: 18 August 1931 Metelen, Province of Westphalia
- Died: 27 December 2016 (aged 85)
- Education: University of Münster; University of Bonn; University of Cologne

Hans Tietmeyer (18 August 1931 – 27 December 2016) was an economist and central banker who served as president of the Deutsche Bundesbank from 1993 until 1999.

== Early life ==
Hans Tietmeyer was born on 18 August 1931 as the second of 11 children of a Roman Catholic family in Metelen (Westphalia). He graduated from Gymnasium Paulinum and initially studied Roman Catholic theology before switching to economics at the University of Münster, University of Bonn and University of Cologne. Following an academic background of Alfred Müller-Armack and Ludwig Erhard he moved into international banking and economics. At the same time, he became expert at table tennis, winning medals at national championships.

== Career ==
In 1962 Tietmeyer started his career in the Federal Ministry of Economics. As a close aide of economics minister Otto Graf Lambsdorff, he drafted a devastating critique of the economic policies of the Social Democrat-Liberal government of Chancellor Helmut Schmidt, which helped precipitate the coalition’s break-up.

As part of the new government of Chancellor Helmut Kohl which took office in 1982, Tietmeyer became State Secretary in the Ministry of Finance under the leadership of minister Gerhard Stoltenberg; in this capacity, he was responsible for international monetary policy, financial policy, EU matters and the preparation of World Economic Summits (sherpa).

In 1988, members of the far-left Red Army Faction (RAF) fired at Tietmeyer’s Mercedes-Benz outside Bonn, striking the car numerous times but leaving Tietmeyer and his driver uninjured.

Tietmeyer was nominated by the government of Chancellor Helmut Kohl to become a member of the board of directors of the Deutsche Bundesbank in 1990, with responsibility for international monetary issues, organisations and agreements. After two years as Vice President he became President of the Deutsche Bundesbank in 1993, a position he held until August 1999. Shortly after taking office at the Bundesbank, he was also appointed by Kohl as personal adviser for the negotiations with East Germany over the economic and monetary union between the two Germanies that preceded their political unification.

Tietmeyer notably opposed the German government in 1997 over its plans to revalue the country's gold reserves to plug a budget shortfall.

During Tietmeyer's tenure as president of the Bundesbank, the Euro was introduced as the currency for most of the EU. Eight months before his retirement, he oversaw the bank's transition to the European System of Central Banks in the course of the creation of Europe's economic and monetary union in January 1999. At the time Tietmeyer forecast that the common currency would lead to painful internal economic adjustments for member states with trade deficits cumulating into debt. Commentator David Marsh in late 2012 drew attention to that forecast as he highlighted "the significant internal devaluations of their currencies though a sharp fall in unit labor costs" which Ireland, Spain, Portugal, Italy and Greece, for example, have suffered in the European sovereign-debt crisis of 2008 onward. This effect of the Euro is similar to the impact of "the classical gold standard", wrote Marsh in describing the phenomenon.

Tietmeyer published more than 100 articles on the subject of economics and was the recipient of many prestigious awards and prizes and was a member of the Pontifical Academy of Social Sciences.

== Later career ==
From January until March 2000, with former president Roman Herzog and former federal judge Paul Kirchhof, Tietmeyer led an independent commission to investigate the CDU donations scandal. He later served on as president of the EBS University of Business and Law from 2000 until 2009.

Tietmeyer served as vice-chairman of the board of directors at the Bank for International Settlements (BIS) from 2003 until 2010. In addition, he held the following positions:

- Hauck & Aufhäuser, member of the supervisory board (since 2001)
- donum vitae, Member of the Board of Trustees (since 2001)
- Depfa Bank, member of the supervisory board (2002–2008)
- Catholic University of Eichstätt-Ingolstadt, member of the board of trustees
- German Federal Environmental Foundation (DBU), member of the board of trustees
- German Doctors for Developing Countries, member of the board of trustees (2008–2016)
- Pontifical Academy of Social Sciences, member

== Personal life ==
Tietmayer married Marie-Luise Flossdorf, with whom he had two children. After her death in 1978 he married Marie-Therese Kalff.
