= SES-15 =

Geostationary communications satellite

- Mission type: Communications
- Operator: SES
- COSPAR ID: 2017-026A
- SATCAT no.: 42709
- Website: https://www.ses.com/
- Mission duration: 15 years (planned); 7 years, 10 months, 8 days (elapsed)

Spacecraft properties
- Spacecraft: SES-15
- Spacecraft type: Boeing 702
- Bus: BSS-702P
- Manufacturer: Boeing Satellite Systems
- Launch mass: 2,302 kg (5,075 lb)

Start of mission
- Launch date: 18 May 2017, 11:54:53 UTC
- Rocket: Soyuz ST-A / Fregat-M
- Launch site: Centre Spatial Guyanais, ELS
- Contractor: Progress Rocket Space Centre
- Entered service: July 2017

Orbital parameters
- Reference system: Geocentric orbit
- Regime: Geostationary orbit
- Longitude: 129° West

Transponders
- Band: Ku-band, Ka-band, Wide Area Augmentation System (WAAS-GEO 6)
- Coverage area: North America, Latin America, Caribbean, Atlantic Ocean region

SES-15 is a geostationary communications satellite operated by SES and designed and manufactured by Boeing Satellite Systems. It has a mass of 2,302 kg (5,075 lb) and has a design life of at least 15 years.

== See also ==
- SES
- List of SES satellites
