= SES Sirius =

Swedish communications satellite operator

SES Sirius, formerly called Nordic Satellite AB (NSAB) was the owner and operator of the two Sirius satellites, which provide the Nordic countries and the Baltic states, with TV, radio, data and communications solutions. The company is today entirely owned and controlled by SES and has no independent existence.

The 2004 SES Annual Report states that 16.4 million homes received broadcast and broadband services from the Sirius system, 1.5 million from the satellites directly and another 14.9 million from cable networks distributing content via Sirius.

== History ==
In 1982 the governments of Sweden and Norway formed NSAB as part of a wide-ranging partnership for the purpose of "telecommunication satellite cooperation". In 1989 the two governments agreed to end their partnership, the Swedish government assumed full ownership with the acquisition of Norway's 15% share.

On April 2, 1989, NSAB's first satellite, the Aérospatiale built Tele-X, was launched on an Ariane 2 rocket from French Guiana. The Swedish Space Corporation (SSC) was contracted to operate the TELE-X system and in 1993 the company acquired the Swedish government's shares, becoming the sole owner.

In late 1993 NSAB acquired Marco Polo 1, a Hughes 376 geostationary communications satellite, from British Sky Broadcasting. Marco Polo 1 was built for and operated by British Satellite Broadcasting. However following that company's collapse it merged with Sky Television to form BSkyB. In this "merger" Sky was the dominant force and their system of transponder lease from SES' Astra satellites was maintained. Marco Polo 1 (and its sister satellite) were gradually withdrawn from service.

In February 1994 Teracom acquired a 50% share of NSAB. The same month Marco Polo 1 re-entered service as Sirius 1 at 5°E. In July 1994 NSAB agreed the purchase of Sirius 2 from Aérospatiale (later Alcatel Space). The satellite was successfully launched on November 12, 1997, by Ariane 4 rocket. Shortly after launch SES signed a lease agreement for all transponders on the satellite.

In 1996 Tele Danmark acquired a 25% share in NSAB from Teracom.

In May 1997 NSAB ordered a Hughes 376HP. The Sirius 3 satellite was successfully launched on October 5, 1998, again by Ariane 4 rocket.

In October 2000 SES acquired the shares of Tele Danmark and Teracom to become 50-50 joint owner with SSC. SES increased its shareholding to 75% in December 2003, and renamed the company to SES Sirius on December 1, 2005. In January 2008, SES further increased its shareholding in SES Sirius to 90%.

In March 2010 SES (as then subsidiary SES Astra) took full control and in June 2010 the company was renamed SES Astra and the only fully operational satellite, Sirius 4, renamed Astra 4A.
