= SES-5 =

Communications satellite

- Names: SES-5 (2011-present); Astra 4B (2010-2011); Sirius 5 (2008-2010)
- Mission type: Communications
- Operator: SES Sirius / SES World Skies / SES
- COSPAR ID: 2012-036A
- SATCAT no.: 38652
- Website: https://www.ses.com/
- Mission duration: 15 years (planned); 13 years, 5 months, 10 days (elapsed)

Spacecraft properties
- Bus: SSL 1300
- Manufacturer: Space Systems/Loral
- Launch mass: 6,086 kg (13,417 lb)

Start of mission
- Launch date: 9 July 2012, 18:38:30 UTC
- Rocket: Proton-M / Briz-M
- Launch site: Baikonur, Site 81/24
- Contractor: Khrunichev State Research and Production Space Center
- Entered service: September 2012

Orbital parameters
- Reference system: Geocentric orbit
- Regime: Geostationary orbit
- Longitude: 5° East

Transponders
- Band: 60 transponders: 24 C-band; 36 Ku-band
- Bandwidth: C-band: 36 MHz; Ku-band: 33-36 MHz
- Coverage area: Atlantic Ocean; Sub-Saharan Africa; North Africa; Europe; Middle East

SES-5 (also known as Astra 4B and Sirius 5) is a commercial geostationary communication satellite operated by SES It was launched on 9 July 2012. The launch was arranged by International Launch Services (ILS).

== History ==
In October 2008, SES Sirius AB of Sweden (then 90% owned by SES and prior to 2003 called Nordic Satellite AB) ordered the Sirius 5 satellite from Space Systems/Loral. Following full acquisition by SES in 2010, SES Sirius was renamed SES Astra (a subsidiary of SES) and the satellite renamed Astra 4B. In 2011, SES Astra was merged back into SES and the satellite renamed SES-5.

== Satellite description ==
It was constructed by Space Systems/Loral, and is based on the SSL 1300 satellite bus. It carries 24 C-band and 36 Ku-band transponders. It covers Atlantic Ocean, Sub-Saharan Africa, North Africa, Europe, Middle East.

== EGNOS payload ==
SES 5 is also carrying a hosted payload L-band navigation terminal for the executive commission of the 27-nation European Union. The terminal operated as part of the European Geostationary Navigation Overlay Service (EGNOS) system, which provides verification of Global Positioning System (GPS) navigation signals through the use of satellites in geostationary orbit.

== Launch ==
Sirius 5 was the original name of the SES-5 satellite. SES-5 that was launched on 9 July 2012, at 18:38:30 UTC from Baikonur Cosmodrome, Site 81/24 and is now co-located with Astra 4A (Sirius 4) at 5° East. This satellite provides a similar European and African coverage as Astra 4A.

== See also ==
- SES
- Astra
- SES Sirius
- SES Astra
- High Above (book)
- 2012 in spaceflight
