= Astra 4A =

Communications satellite

- COSPAR ID: 2007-057A
- SATCAT no.: 32299
- Mission duration: 15 years (planned); 17 years, 3 months, 16 days (elapsed)

Spacecraft properties
- Bus: A2100AX
- Manufacturer: Lockheed Martin
- Launch mass: 4,600 kilograms (10,100 lb)
- Power: 8,100 watts

Start of mission
- Launch date: 18 November 2007
- Rocket: Proton-M/Briz-M
- Launch site: Baikonur 200/39
- Contractor: ILS

Orbital parameters
- Reference system: Geocentric
- Regime: Geostationary
- Longitude: 5° East

Transponders
- Band: 52 K_{u} band 2 K_{a} band
- Bandwidth: 33, 36, 72 megahertz (K_{u} band); 125, 250 megahertz (K_{a} band)
- TWTA power: 49, 116 & 140 watts (K_{u} band), 118 & 126 watts (K_{a} band)
- EIRP: 50 decibel-watts

Astra 4A (originally Sirius 4) is one of the Astra communications satellites owned and operated by SES at the Astra 5°E orbital slot providing digital television and radio broadcasts, data, and interactive services to Nordic countries, eastern Europe and sub-Saharan Africa in the 11.70 GHz-12.75 GHz range of the K_{u} band and 18.8 GHz-21.75 GHz range of the K_{a} band.

== Overview ==
The satellite was launched in November 2007 as Sirius 4 by SES Sirius. At that time, SES owned a 75% shareholding in SES Sirius, which was increased to 90% in 2008 and to 100% in March 2010. In June 2010, the affiliate company was renamed SES Astra (then a subsidiary company of SES) and the Sirius 4 satellite was renamed Astra 4A.

Astra 4A provides three K_{u} band broadcast beams - the Nordic beam to Denmark, Norway, Sweden and Finland, the European beam to Eastern European and Baltic countries including Belarus, Bulgaria, Estonia, Latvia, Lithuania, Romania, Russia and Ukraine, and the African beam to sub-Saharan Africa.

Reception is possible on dishes as small as 60 cm from all three beams, with reception from the European beam across Europe and from the African beam across sub-Saharan across Africa with dishes of 90 cm-120 cm.

The satellite also carries a dedicated payload of two transponders for K_{a} band services, for applications such as interactive and contribution services. Both uplink and downlink within the African footprint are available, and also inter-connectivity between Africa and Europe so broadcasting out of Europe is available without the need for expensive fibre ground links.

Five of these African beam transponders are contracted with ETV and Globecast having signed one transponder each and three transponders signed by On Digital Media for the South African TopTV network.

Co-located with Astra 4A at 5°E is the SES-5 satellite. Launched in July 2012, this satellite provides a similar European and African coverage and was originally named Sirius 5, but renamed to Astra 4B in 2010 and then to SES-5 in 2011.

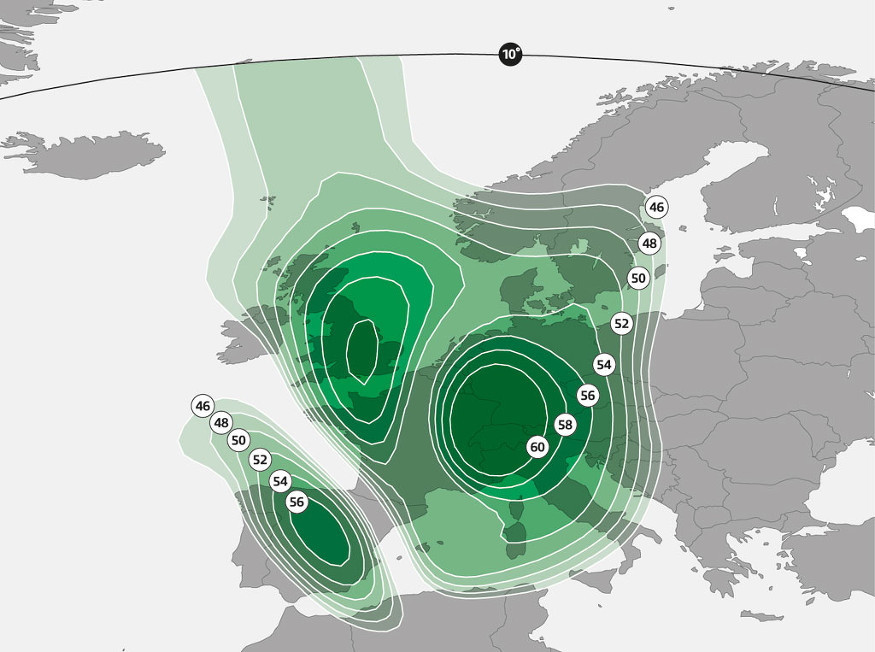
Astra 4A Ka-Band VSAT Footprint

== Previous use of name ==
The Astra 4A designation was originally given in June 2005 to 33 transponders of the NSS-10 craft (itself formerly called AMC-12) owned by another then subsidiary of SES, SES New Skies, and positioned at 37.5° west for broadcast, data, and telecommunications into Africa.

For the current spacecraft, the Astra 4A designation originally applied only to the FSS Africa beam that provides six 36 MHz transponders for sub-Saharan Africa. The remainder of the spacecraft was called Sirius 4 at that time (from November 2007 to June 2010).

== See also ==
- SES-5 co-located satellite
- Sirius 3 previously co-located satellite
- Astra 5°E orbital position
- SES satellite owner
- TopTV broadcaster
