= SES (company) =

Communications satellite owner and operator

Coordinates: 49°41′39″N 06°19′49″E

SES S.A.
- Logo used since 2025

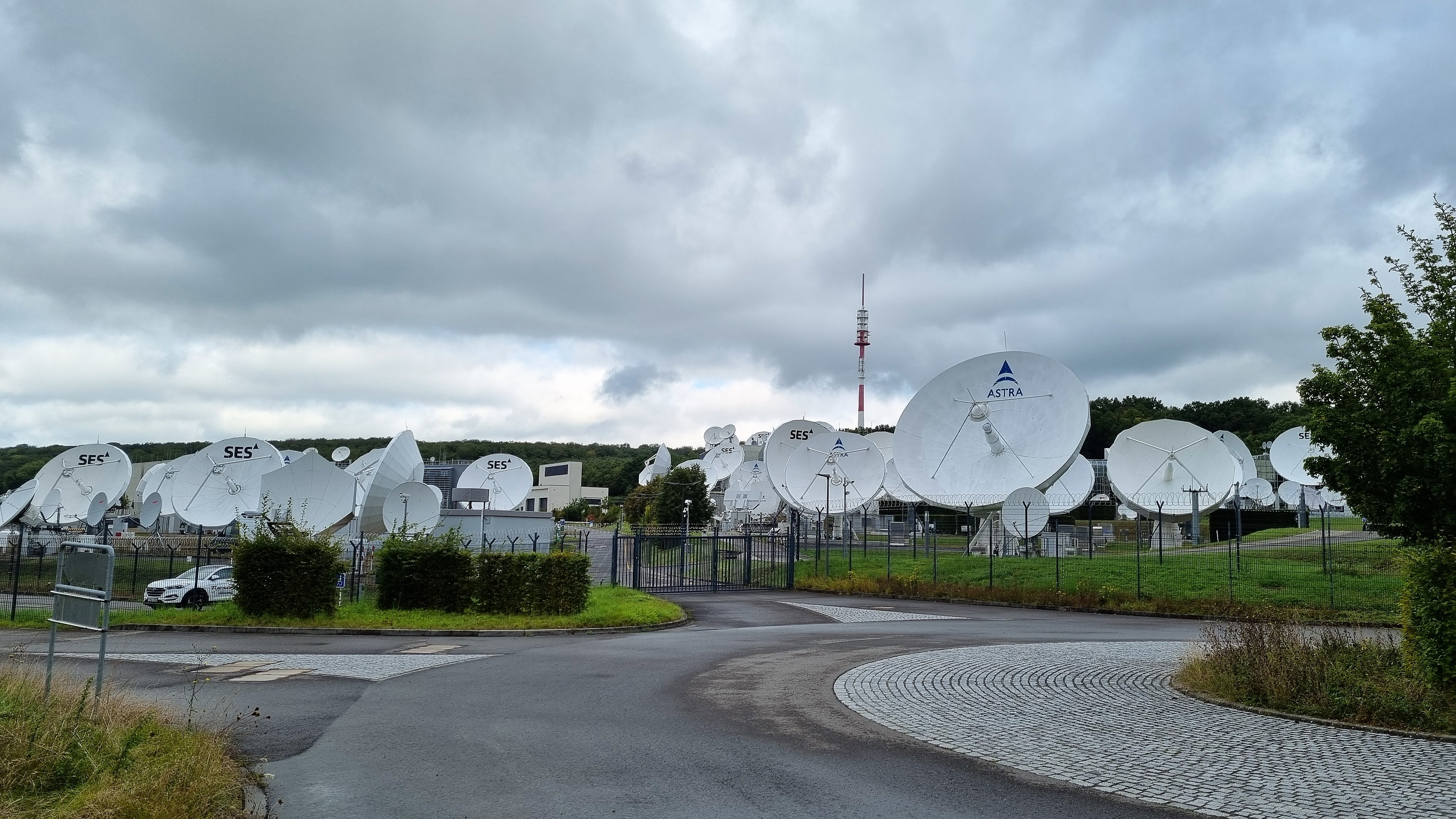
- Uplink dishes at the SES headquarters in Betzdorf, Luxembourg
- Formerly: Société Européenne des Satellites (1985-2001); SES Global (2001-2006)
- Type: Société Anonyme
- Traded as: LuxSE: SESG; Euronext Paris: SESG; CAC Mid 60 Component
- ISIN: ISIN: LU0088087324
- Industry: Telecommunications
- Founded: 1985; 41 years ago
- Founder: Candace Johnson; Government of Luxembourg
- Headquarters: Château de Betzdorf, Betzdorf, Luxembourg
- Key people: Frank Esser (Chairman); Adel Al-Saleh (CEO)
- Products: Communications satellites and services
- Revenue: ▼€2,001 million (2024)
- Operating income: ▲€64 million (2024)
- Net income: ▲€27 million (2024)
- Total assets: ▲€10,327 million (2024)
- Total equity: ▼€3,492 million (2024)
- Number of employees: 2,134 (end 2024)
- Divisions: SES Networks; SES Media
- Subsidiaries: GovSat (50%); HD+; Quetzsat; Redu Space Services (52%); SES Space and Defense; SES Techcom; YahLive (35%)
- Website: www.ses.com

SES S.A. is a Luxembourgish communications satellite operator supplying video and data connectivity worldwide to broadcasters, content and internet service providers, mobile and fixed network operators, governments and institutions.

SES owns and operates over 70 satellites in two different orbits: geostationary orbit (GEO) and medium Earth orbit (MEO). These include European Astra TV satellites, the O3b and O3b mPOWER data satellites and others with names including AMC, Ciel, NSS, Quetzsat, YahSat and SES.

In April 2024, SES announced the acquisition of satellite services provider, Intelsat to create a more competitive multi-orbit satellite operator. The acquisition was cleared by the UK Competition and Markets Authority in May 2025, and by the European Commission in June 2025. The merger cleared the final regulatory hurdle when the US Federal Communications Commission granted its approval of the deal in July 2025. The acquisition of Intelsat was completed on 17 July 2025 after receiving the required international regulatory approvals.

Based in Betzdorf, Luxembourg, and founded in 1985 as Société Européenne des Satellites, the company was renamed SES Global in 2001 and has been simply "SES" since 2006. The company's stock is listed on the Luxembourg Stock Exchange and Euronext Paris with the ticker symbol SESG and is a component of the LuxX, CAC Next 20 and Euronext 100 stock market indexes.

A book, High Above, telling the story of the founding of SES and the development of its first Astra satellites was published in 2010 to mark the company's 25th Anniversary, and was followed by Even Higher in 2012 and Beyond Frontiers in 2016.

== History ==
=== Early years ===
SES was formed on the initiative and support of the Luxembourgish government in 1985 as Société Européenne des Satellites (SES). The Grand Duchy of Luxembourg remains a major shareholder. In December 1988, as Europe's first private satellite operator, SES launched its first satellite, Astra 1A, to the 19.2° East orbital position. Rupert Murdoch's Sky TV, along with German broadcasters Pro7, Sat.1, and RTL were among Astra's first major customers.

By 1990, Astra was broadcasting to 14 million cable and DTH (Direct to Home) viewers. SES was the pioneer of 'co-location' by which several satellites share the same orbital position to provide mutual backup and increase the number of channels available to a fixed receiving dish, creating what became known as a 'satellite neighbourhood'. Astra's prime slot, 19.2° East, saw as many as eight satellites sharing the position simultaneously and helped to build up Astra's reputation for reliability.

Rapid growth in Germany, in what would become Astra's largest European market, was helped by the German government's decision to liberalize the installation of dishes in 1991. In this time SES became the leading satellite system providing direct-to-home transmission, and became the world's largest satellite platform for TV distribution.

In 1996, after the launch of Astra 1E, SES pioneered digital satellite transmission with the French Canal+. In 1998, SES launched Astra 2A for the UK market, transmitting at the new orbital position 28.2° East, and eventually moving all of its United Kingdom and Ireland transmission capacity to this orbital slot. In the same year, SES went public on the Luxembourg Stock Exchange trading as SESG (in 2005 SES would also list on the Paris Euronext).

=== Global expansion ===
From 1999, SES began a period of ambitious global expansion beyond its European home market. Geographic expansion went hand-in-hand with the diversification of SES' services beyond just TV broadcasting, to cover telecommunication services for businesses, telecommunications companies and government customers, as well as broadband access and technical consultancy services.

In 1999, SES acquired a 34.13% stake in Hong Kong-based satellite operator AsiaSat and took a foothold in Asia and the Pacific region.

In 2000, SES acquired 50% of Scandinavian satellite broadcaster Nordic Satellite AB (NSAB), later renamed SES Sirius, which strengthened SES' coverage in northern and eastern Europe. The same year, SES also took a participation of 19.99% in Brazilian satellite operator Star One, gaining a first presence in Latin America.

In 2001, SES bought 28.75% of Argentina's Nahuelsat and acquired GE Americom, giving it a solid presence in the important North American market. This resulted in the formation of SES Global, a corporate entity with two operating companies, SES Astra and SES Americom. Altogether, SES operated a fleet of 41 geostationary satellites, the largest in the world in 2001.

In 2003, SES' stake in NSAB was increased to 75%.

In 2005, SES acquired a participation in Canadian satellite operator Ciel and in Mexico's Quetzsat, as well as the divestment from Nahuelsat.

SES acquired services provider, Digital Playout Centre GmbH (later Astra Platform Services, then SES Platform Services, then MX1, now merged into SES) in 2005.

In 2006, SES acquired ND SatCom, a German provider of government services, developing a services portfolio beyond just bandwidth provision.

Also in 2006, SES acquired New Skies Satellites, later renamed SES New Skies, adding six satellites to the SES fleet and strengthening coverage in Asia, the Middle East and Africa.

In 2007, SES divested from its holdings in AsiaSat and Star One in a complex transaction with General Electric which itself divested from SES.

In 2008, SES increased its stake in NSAB to 90%. and merged its two international operating units, SES Americom and SES New Skies into a new segment which was branded SES World Skies in September 2009.

In 2009, SES and Middle East satellite operator Yahsat announced the formation of a joint venture, YahLive, to commercialise 23 Ku-band transponders on Yahsat 1A, serving the Middle East, North Africa and Western Asia with direct-to-home TV services.

Also in 2009, SES announced its investment in O3b Networks a project to build a medium Earth orbit (MEO) satellite constellation to deliver high-speed, low-latency, fibre-like internet broadband trunking to the world's emerging regions ("the Other 3 billion").

In 2010, SES grew its stake in SES Sirius to 100% and closed the acquisition of the in-orbit satellite Protostar-2/Indostar-2, renaming it SES-7 and integrating it into its fleet covering India and Southeast Asia.

In May and September 2011, SES restructured and rebranded the company to streamline the organisation's activities under a single management team and one main brand (SES), incorporating the company's two previous operating entities, SES Astra and SES World Skies.

=== Global operator ===
In August 2011, the Astra 1N satellite was launched to the 28.2° East orbital position, and in September 2011, the QuetzSat 1 satellite was launched to 77.0° West

In February 2012, SES-4 was successfully launched to become SES' 50th satellite and the largest, heaviest and most powerful in the fleet. In July 2012, SES-5, the 51st SES Satellite was launched from Baikonur, Kazakhstan to 5.0° East with 36 Ku-band transponders to provide coverage over Sub-Saharan Africa and the Nordic and the Baltic regions in Europe, and 28 C-band transponders for Europe, Africa and the Middle East.

In September 2012, Astra 2F was successfully launched from Kourou in French Guiana, the first of three "next generation" satellites at the second Astra orbital position at 28.2° East. The satellite has Ku-band coverage of all Europe, the British Isles and sub-Saharan Africa for DTH television, and Ka-band coverage of Central Europe for the SES Broadband satellite internet service.

SES-6 was launched from Baikonur, Kazakhstan, on 3 June 2013 to 40.5° East, to replace NSS-806 and provide continuity of service and expansion capacity in C-band for Latin America and the Caribbean. The satellite has 43 C-band and 48 Ku-band transponders with comprehensive coverage of North America, Latin America, Europe and the Atlantic Ocean.

Astra 2E was launched to the Astra 28.2° East position from Baikonur in Kazakhstan on 30 September 2013 to provide free-to-air and encrypted DTH digital TV and satellite broadband services for Europe and the Middle East. The successful launch followed a 10-week delay due to the postponement of all launches by launch services provider ILS after a catastrophic failure of the rocket in a previous launch.

In December 2013, SES-8 was launched from Cape Canaveral using a SpaceX Falcon 9 v1.1, the first geostationary satellite to be launched with a SpaceX rocket.

In March 2014, Astra 5B was launched as SES' 56th satellite to the Astra 31.5° East position from Kourou in French Guiana to provide transponder capacity and extend geographical reach over Central and Eastern Europe, Russia and the Commonwealth of Independent States (CIS) for DTH, direct-to-cable and contribution feeds to digital terrestrial television networks.

In April 2014, Romain Bausch stepped down as president and CEO of SES, a position he had held since 1995 overseeing the growth of the company from a European Direct-to-Home satellite system with four satellites into a global satellite industry leader operating a fleet of more than 50 satellites. Bausch continues to serve SES as a non-executive Director, and is elected to take the role of chairman at the start of 2015. He was succeeded as CEO by Karim Michel Sabbagh.

In May 2014 SES announced that the engineering services division, SES TechCom had joined with the Luxembourg Government and the Minister for Cooperation and Humanitarian Action, and five Non-governmental organisations (NGO) – Archemed, Fondation Follereau, Friendship, German Doctors and Médecins Sans Frontières to form Satmed, an eHealth platform to improve public health in emerging and developing countries, especially in remote areas with poor connectivity.

In July 2014, SES announced that nearly half of the SES satellite fleet is controlled from the new satellite operations center (SOC) opened at its sales and engineering offices in Princeton, New Jersey. 23 satellites are controlled from Princeton with the remainder operated from SES's global headquarters in Luxembourg.

Astra 2G, the final "next generation" satellite for the 28.2° East orbital position was launched from the Baikonur in December 2014 to deliver broadcast, VSAT and broadband services to Europe, the Middle East and Africa, and to connect West Africa to Europe via Ka-band.

On 13 January 2015, SES announced that it plans to procure and launch a satellite in partnership with the Luxembourg Government, to be called GovSat-1. Jointly owned, the satellite is launched in 2017 to an orbital position above Europe and provide governmental and military communications in the X-band and Ka-band with coverage of Europe, the Middle East, Africa and Asia-Pacific.

In February 2016, it was announced that, subject to regulatory approvals, subsidiary, SES Platform Services would purchase RR Media, a global digital media services provider to the broadcast and media industries, based in Israel. In July 2016, SES announced that the acquisition was complete and that the merged company would be known as MX1.

In March 2016, the SES-9 satellite was successfully launched by a Falcon 9 Full Thrust rocket from Cape Canaveral after four previous attempts on 24 February, 25 February, 28 February, and 1 March 2016 - all aborted due to weather and launcher problems. The satellite used electric propulsion to reach geostationary orbit and will be positioned at 108.2° East to provide 81 Ku-band transponder equivalents for pay-TV, data and mobility across Northeast Asia and South Asia, and Indonesia.

In April 2016, SES announced that (subject to regulatory approvals which are expected to be completed by the end of 2016) it will pay US$20 million to increase its fully diluted ownership of O3b Networks from 49.1% to 50.5%, taking a controlling share in the company. In May 2016, SES said it would raise another US$710 million to purchase 100% of O3b Networks, exercising a call option with O3b minority shareholders and eliminating the possibility of an O3b stock offering, and then subsequently announced the completion of the capital raising and completion of the acquisition.

In May 2016, Modern Times Group, owner of the Viasat DTH platform announced that the Viasat Ultra HD channel would launch in the autumn on the SES-5 satellite at 5.0° East, as the first UHD channel for the Nordic region and the first UHD Sports channel in the World. The channel will feature selected live sport events especially produced in Ultra HD and Viasat will also be launching an Ultra HD set-top box from Samsung and a TV-module to enable existing UHD TVs to display the channel. SES claimed the launch of Viasat Ultra HD will bring the number of UHD channels (including test channels and regional versions) carried on SES satellites to 24, or 46% of all UHD channels broadcast via satellite worldwide.

On 30 March 2017, the SES-10 satellite was successfully launched from Cape Canaveral by a SpaceX Falcon 9 rocket using a refurbished first stage booster that had been previously used to launch a SpaceX Dragon cargo ship to the International Space Station for NASA in April 2016 and then landed and recovered. This is the first time that a rocket booster has been reused in this way. Both the Falcon 9 first stage and the payload fairing were successfully recovered after the SES-10 launch for subsequent reuse. SES-10 is positioned at 67.0° West to serve Latin America.

In April 2017, the Luxembourg Ministry of Foreign and European Affairs extended the contract with SES to maintain, support, and continue to develop the Satmed eHealth platform to improve public health in remote areas of developing countries until 2020, extending the provision of satellite connectivity over Africa, the Philippines and Bangladesh.

In May 2017, SES announced the successful integration with the SES-14 satellite of the NASA Global-scale Observations of the Limb and Disk (GOLD) scientific hosted payload built by the University of Colorado Boulder Laboratory for Atmospheric and Space Physics. The first scientific payload carried by an SES satellite, GOLD was integrated with SES-14 at Airbus Defence and Space in Toulouse, France ahead of its launch to 47.5° West in late 2017 on a SpaceX Falcon 9 Full Thrust from Kennedy Space Center in Cape Canaveral, Florida.

In June 2017, SES announced the start of a 30-month project by the Satellite and Terrestrial Network for 5G (SaT5G) consortium for the seamless, and economically viable, integration of satellite (such as SES' geostationary orbit and medium Earth orbit high throughput satellites) into future 5G networks, improving the ubiquity, resilience and efficiency of 5G services, and opening new markets in media distribution, transport and underserved areas. The consortium is funded by the European Commission under the Horizon 2020 programme and comprises 16 members, including SES and Airbus Defence and Space, Avanti Communications, British Telecom, Broadpeak, Gilat Satellite Networks, OneAccess, Thales Alenia Space, TNO, University of Surrey, and Zodiac Inflight Innovation.

In September 2017, SES announced the next generation of O3b satellites and service. Named O3b mPOWER, the new constellation of (initially) seven MEO satellites built by Boeing Satellite Systems will deliver 10 terabits of capacity globally through 30,000 spot beams for broadband internet services. O3b mPOWER is expected to launch in 2021.

On 11 October 2017, a flight-proven (refurbished) SpaceX Falcon 9 rocket launched the SES-11 satellite to the geostationary orbital position of 105.0° West. The launch was originally set for late 2016 but suffered a year-long delay because of SpaceX's September 2016 Falcon 9 explosion. SES-11 was built by Airbus Defence and Space and is a dual mission satellite, with 24 Ku-band transponders marketed by EchoStar as EchoStar 105 to replace capacity on SES' AMC-15 satellite, and 24 C-band transponders marketed by SES as SES-11 for replacement capacity for AMC-18 delivering video, especially HD and UHD, to the United States, Mexico and the Caribbean. Following positioning at 105.0° West and in-orbit testing, SES-11 was declared fully operational on 29 November 2017.

In February 2018, SES teamed up with Intelsat (later joined by Eutelsat in July 2018) for a proposal to United States Federal Communications Commission (FCC) to form a consortium of satellite service providers to protect the quality and reliability of existing video and audio services to United States households downlinking in the 3700-4200 MHz C-band spectrum while enabling wireless operators to access 100 MHz of C-band spectrum for deployment of next generation 5G services in the United States.

In March 2018, Saint Martin-based satellite TV provider KiwiSAT launched a new DTH platform to deliver about 130 channels (including 90 HD channels) of TV entertainment to consumers across the Caribbean using the SES-10 satellite at 67.0° West.

In May 2018, SES broadcast an 8K television signal via its satellite system for the first time, as part of its Industry Days conference at the Luxembourg HQ. The 8K demonstration content, with a resolution of 7680 x 4320 pixels, a frame rate of 60 frames per second and 10-bit colour depth, was encoded in HEVC and transmitted at a rate of 80 Mbit/s via the Astra 3B satellite.

In September 2018, in response to a Notice of Proposed Rulemaking of July 2018 from the United States Federal Communications Commission (FCC) to make the 3.7 to 4.2 GHz spectrum available for next-generation terrestrial fixed and mobile broadband services, SES, along with Intelsat, Eutelsat and Telesat - together providing the majority of C-band satellite services in the United States, including media distribution reaching 100 million United States households - established the C-Band Alliance (CBA). The consortium's proposal to the FCC is to act as a facilitator for the clearing and repurposing of a 200 MHz portion of C-band spectrum to accelerate the deployment of next generation 5G services while protecting incumbent users and their content distribution and data networks in the US from potential interference.

In April 2019, four O3b medium Earth orbit (MEO) satellites were launched by Arianespace at the Centre Spatial Guyanais in Kourou, French Guiana to complete the constellation of 20 first generation satellites for the SES-owned network communications service provider.

In May 2019, for the first time in Europe, 8K demonstration content was received via satellite without the need for a separate external receiver or decoder. At the 2019, SES Industry Days conference at Betzdorf, Luxembourg broadcast quality 8K content (with a resolution of 7680 x 4320 pixels at 50 frames/s) was encoded using a Spin Digital HEVC encoder (at a bit rate of 70 Mbit/s), uplinked to a single 33 MHz transponder on SES' Astra 28.2°E satellites and the downlink received and displayed on a Samsung 82in Q950RB production model TV.

In September 2019, SES announced it had partnered with satellite payload and network management systems developer, Kythera Space Solutions to develop the ARC (Adaptive Resource Control) software to enable the dynamic control and optimisation of power, throughput, beams and frequency allocation on O3b mPOWER, SES-17 and other future high-throughput satellites and their networks, autonomously optimizing space and ground resources, on-the-fly, in accordance with customers' changing needs.

In September 2019, SES became a Microsoft Azure ExpressRoute services partner to provide dedicated, private network connectivity from sea vessels, aircraft, and industrial or government sites anywhere in the world to the Azure cloud computing service, via both its geostationary and O3b medium Earth orbit satellites.

In September 2019, SES announced a new Free-to-view DTH platform on Astra 1N at 19.2° East, encrypted using Verimatrix and carrying 30-40 channels from Russian-language OTT broadcaster Kartina TV for Russian-speaking diaspora across Europe with limited broadband connectivity.

In September 2019, the media technical services provider MX1, a wholly owned subsidiary of SES, was merged into the SES Video division, dropping the MX1 brand and providing all broadcast and streamed content management, playout, distribution, and monetisation services under the SES name.

In May 2020, SES released the results of the 2019 Satellite Monitor TV reception survey, which for the first time covered the Philippines. The survey found satellite TV is the second-most popular mode of TV reception in the Philippines with 17% of over 20.8 million TV households, behind terrestrial TV (66%), and that broadcasts from SES satellites reach 98% of Filipino satellite TV households.

On 26 May 2020, SES elected to clear a portion of the C-Band spectrum in the United States, currently used for satellite TV services, in accordance with the Federal Communications Commission (FCC) order for the accelerated release of the 3.7-4.0 GHz portion of the band for 5G mobile broadband services. The SES Board of Directors approved US$1.6 billion for the procurement and launch of new satellites and other equipment and services for the migration of existing customers using the spectrum, which will be reimbursable through the FCC Clearinghouse. In June 2020, SES announced that four new C-band satellites had been ordered for this purpose from United States manufacturers, Boeing and Northrop Grumman. SES-18 and SES-19 will be GEOStar-3 satellites designed, assembled, and tested by Northrop Grumman, and SES-20 and SES-21 will be all-electric 702SP satellites from Boeing. Each satellite will have ten 36 MHz C-band transponders for delivery of digital TV and data services, and will be launched in 2022 to orbital slots at 103.0° West, 131.0° West and 135.0° West.

In July 2020, SES launched a free-to-air information channel, Fight COVID-19, across several satellites to combat the global coronavirus pandemic. Available to millions of households across Africa, Europe, and Asia-Pacific, and providing underserved and rural communities with critical information about how to limit the spread of the virus, the content is provided by trusted organisations such as UNICEF, AFP and other international and regional organisations. The channel is broadcast from SES-5 (5.0° East) for Sub-Saharan Africa, Astra 4A (5.0° East) for Europe and Ukraine, Astra 2F (28.2° East) for West Africa, NSS-12 (57.0° East) for Ethiopia and adjacent countries, and SES-9 (108.2° East) for the Philippines.

In August 2020, SES ordered two C-Band geostationary TV satellites from Thales Alenia Space. SES-22 and SES-23 are the last of six satellites SES needs to relocate existing C-band services from a portion of the C-band spectrum in accordance with the Federal Communications Commission's plans to repurpose the frequencies for 5G cellular networks.

In August 2020 SES contracted Boeing to build four O3b mPOWER satellites in addition to the seven already under construction. SpaceX was contracted for an additional two launches, to make four launches for the whole O3b mPOWER constellation in 2021–2024.

In September 2020, SES and Microsoft announced that SES was the medium Earth orbit connectivity partner for the Microsoft Azure Orbital ground station service that enables network operators to control their satellite operations and capacity from within the Azure cloud computing service. Under their agreement, SES and Microsoft will jointly invest in Azure Orbital ground stations for the MEO and Earth Observation segments, initially in the US, which will be installed and managed by SES. Also, satellite telemetry, tracking and control systems and data ground stations for the O3b mPOWER satellites will be located with Microsoft's Azure edge sites to provide O3b mPOWER customers with ‘one-hop’ access to Azure cloud services.

In February 2021, SES agreed multi-year extension capacity contracts worth over €66 million with European public service broadcasters including ARD, BBC, BVN, France 24, TV5Monde and ZDF

In March 2021, the Luxembourg government further extended the contract with SES to provide the Satmed satellite eHealth platform to improve public health in remote areas of developing countries until 2024, with a €6.5 billion budget and plans for additional functionalities and deployments, and new partnerships with both more NGOs and supranational organisations to provide regional or cross-country support.

In June 2021, SES joined the Amazon Web Services Direct Connect Delivery Partner programme, to provide customers access to AWS cloud-based applications and services from locations around the world with limited or no terrestrial communications, claiming to be the first satellite operator to do so. The service is provided via SES' geostationary satellites and the O3b medium Earth orbit satellites and also gives cloud providers a backup network if their infrastructure fails.

In July 2021, SES entered into a capacity agreement with Indian public sector enterprise, NewSpace India Limited (NSIL) for 9 transponders on the SES-8 satellite at 95°E, for distribution of satellite TV services across India and the thriving direct-to-home market.

In August 2021, Microsoft became the first cloud computing provider customer for SES' O3b medium Earth orbit satellite system, with Microsoft buying managed satellite connectivity services from SES for the Microsoft Azure cloud service. Microsoft is initially using the existing first generation O3b satellites, before upgrading to the faster broadband speeds from the O3b mPOWER satellites when they come into operation in 2022.

In September 2021, the wholly owned direct-to-consumer HD service in Germany, HD+ launched the HD+ ToGo app for Android and iOS smartphones and tablets giving existing subscribers access to the platform's 50 HD channels, along with catch-up services and online functions, on mobile devices for an additional fee.

In October 2021, the SES-17 satellite was launched from the Guiana Space Centre in Kourou, French Guiana, SES's first geostationary Ka-band high-throughput satellite. SES-17 has an all-electric propulsion system and will reach its 67.1°W position in geostationary orbit in mid-2022, providing coverage for aeronautical, maritime, enterprise, and government markets across the Americas, the Caribbean and the Atlantic Ocean. It has a fully digital payload with nearly 200 reprogrammable spot beams that can be freely interconnected and changed in power and frequency in real-time to adapt to changing customer demands, and will operate in conjunction with SES's O3b mPOWER medium Earth orbit satellites as a multi-orbit system.

In November 2021, SES ordered two replacement satellites from Thales Alenia Space for launch in 2024 to SES's original orbital position at 19.2°E and service well into the 2040s. Like the satellites currently at the Astra 19.2°E slot (Astra 1KR, Astra 1L, Astra 1M, and Astra 1N - all launched 10–15 years ago, with the older two at the end of their planned life), Astra 1P will provide direct-to-home broadcast TV to Europe, in particular Germany, France and Spain. Astra 1Q is a reconfigurable software defined satellite with both wide beams for broadcast TV and high-throughput spot beams for video and data customers.

In November 2021, SES announced that wholly owned subsidiary HD+, the premium HD and UHD satellite TV service for German users, would start a new service, HD+ IP, in December 2021 to stream HD+ channels to viewers' TV sets through a smart TV app without the need for a dish or set-top box, for a subscription of €6 per month.

In December 2021, SES's wholly owned subsidiary SES Government Solutions (now SES Space & Defense) announced that the US Army has conducted trials of commercial satellite constellations in multiple orbits, including SES's O3b medium Earth orbit satellites, as part of the effort to establish Multi-Domain Operations.

In December 2021, Honeywell, Hughes Network Systems and SES demonstrated multi-orbit high-speed airborne connectivity for military customers using Honeywell's JetWave MCX terminal and a Hughes HM-series modem, and SES satellites in both medium Earth orbit (MEO) and geostationary orbit (GEO). The tests achieved full duplex data rates of more than 40 megabits per second via a number of SES' (GEO) satellites including GovSat-1, and the high-throughput, low-latency O3b MEO satellite constellation, with connections moving between GEO/MEO links in under 30 sec.

In February 2022, SES formed a joint venture with India's biggest telco, Jio Platforms (JPL). The newly formed Jio Space Technology Limited will deliver broadband services in India of up to 100 Gbit/s capacity, using the SES-12 high-throughput geostationary satellite and the O3b mPOWER medium Earth orbit satellite constellation, to extend JPL's terrestrial network, enhancing access to digital services in unconnected areas within India and the region. JPL and SES will own 51% and 49% equity stake respectively in the new company.

In February 2022, Orange announced that, along with SES, it will deploy and manage the first gateway in Africa for SES's O3b mPOWER medium Earth orbit satellite constellation, to provide high-speed, low-latency, and cloud-optimised connectivity services across Africa, and to support telemetry, tracking and command functions for the satellites. The gateway will be located at the Sonatel teleport in Gandoul, Senegal.

In March 2022, SES announced a deal with mobile operator, Verizon to speed up deployment of 5G services in the US. Under the agreement, SES will install filters and other equipment to Earth Stations across the entire country, to give Verizon access to the 3.7-3.8 GHz C-band spectrum in key regions ahead of the deadlines for relocation of existing satellite services set out in the FCC's order to make part of the C-Band spectrum available for 5G terrestrial fixed and mobile broadband services.

In March 2022, SES announced the agreement to acquire DRS Global Enterprise Solutions (GES), a US-based subsidiary of defence contractor, Leonardo DRS for US$450 million. GES provides managed satcom services to the US Defence Department and other government agencies, and when the transaction is concluded (expected towards the end of 2022 after regulatory approvals) the business will be combined with SES subsidiary, SES Government Solutions (now SES Space & Defense), doubling its revenue from the US government and further expanding market access for SES's next-generation Medium Earth orbit network, O3b mPOWER, which will begin operation at that time.

In March 2022, SES extended the November 2021 order for two satellites from Thales Alenia Space with a third satellite, SES-26. With both Ku-band and C-band transponders, the reconfigurable software-defined satellite will replace NSS-12 at 57°E, providing content delivery and connectivity across Europe, Africa, the Middle East, and Asia-Pacific.

In May 2022, SES subsidiary, SES Government Solutions (now SES Space & Defense), in partnership with Earth imaging company, Planet Labs PBC, was awarded a US$28.96 million contract from NASA's Communications Services Project for real-time, always-on low-latency connectivity services to NASA spacecraft, using SES's geostationary orbiting C-band satellites and medium Earth orbiting Ka-band satellites, including the O3b mPOWER constellation.

In May 2022, in conjunction with Kazakhstani mobile network operator, Kcell, SES used the O3b satellite constellation to demonstrate that medium Earth orbit satellites could be used to provide high-speed 3G and 4G connectivity to remote regions of Kazakhstan for reliable video calling, conferencing and streaming, and web browsing, with a latency five times lower than on the existing platform based on geostationary orbit satellites.

In June 2022, the SES-22 satellite was successfully launched from the Cape Canaveral Space Force Station by a SpaceX Falcon 9 Block 5 rocket. SES-22 will operate at 135° W, and is the first to launch of SES's six geostationary C-band satellites (SES-18, SES-19, SES-20, SES-21, SES-22, and SES-23) that will enable existing TV and radio services to be moved from the lower 300 MHz of the C-band spectrum to the upper 200 MHz, as part of the Federal Communications Commission (FCC) programme to make room for the deployment of 5G services across the US.

In August 2022, SES completed the US$450 million acquisition of DRS Global Enterprise Solutions (GES) from US defence contractor, Leonardo DRS, after obtaining the necessary regulatory approvals. The business will be combined with SES subsidiary, SES Government Solutions (now SES Space & Defense) to create a “scaled solutions provider serving the multi-orbit satellite communications needs of the US Government” and SES's largest data business segment by revenue.

In September 2022, the European Space Agency (ESA) announced that SES will lead a consortium of 20 European companies to develop and launch Eagle-1, a low Earth orbit satellite to demonstrate and provide early access for European Union governments and institutions to long-distance quantum key distribution (QKD) for ultra-secure data transmissions. In May 2023, it was announced that laser communication technology company TESAT will build the QKD module and payload equipment for a secure space-to-ground optical link.

In October 2022, the SES-20 and SES-21 satellites were successfully launched on an Atlas V rocket from Cape Canaveral. The two Boeing-built C-band satellites are part of SES's programme to clear part of the C-band spectrum for 5G services. SES-20 and SES-21 will be positioned at 103° West and 131° West, respectively, to provide a continued service of TV and radio broadcasts to the US. The satellites were expected to begin operations in November 2022. SES-21 became operational at 131° West on 1 December 2022. SES-20 arrived at the 103° West orbital slot on 5 January 2023 where it will serve as an in-orbit spare satellite in case of failure of other SES satellites used in the C-band clearance programme.

In October 2022, SES announced that it had launched a content distribution platform dedicated to sports and events, providing coverage over Europe, the Middle East and North Africa, for customers including broadcasters, professional sports leagues, national and international sports associations, and sports rights holders.

In December 2022, following the acquisition of DRS Global Enterprise Solutions in August 2022, and its merger into SES Government Solutions, the combined subsidiary company was renamed SES Space & Defense, and restructured into two business units, Space Initiatives (using SES's multi-orbit satellite fleet and infrastructure) and Defense Networks (providing multi-operator managed services and end-to-end mission communications).

On 16 December 2022, the first two O3b mPOWER satellites were successfully launched from Cape Canaveral Space Force Station in Florida at 5:48 pm local time. It is expected to take approximately six months for each satellite to reach its designated medium Earth orbit and for commissioning, and the O3b mPower service to start in Q3 2023.

In January 2023, SES announced an agreement with High View, the Munich-based owner of the Deluxe Music channel, to lease additional capacity on the Astra 19.2°E satellites for four new music channels, Deluxe Dance by Kontor, Deluxe Flashback, Deluxe Rock and Deluxe Rap. Aimed at German-speaking viewers in Germany, Austria, and Switzerland, the new channels started on 1 February 2023 and broadcast free-to-air. In February, High View announced that its streamed travel and documentary channels, Xplore, Hip Trips and One Terra will also broadcast free-to-air via Astra 19.2°E from 1 March 1, 2023.

On 26 January 2023, the Astra 2D satellite was decommissioned and retired to a graveyard orbit more than 22 years after its launch in December 2000. Astra 2D was built for SES by Hughes Space and Communications (now Boeing Satellite Development Center) with a design life of 15 years providing direct-to-home digital TV distribution from the Astra 28.2°E orbital position. It was the last commercial spin-stabilised spacecraft built by Hughes and, at the time of its retirement, the only one still in operation.

In February 2023, SES notified the Federal Communications Commission (FCC) that the deployment plan for the SES-18 and SES-19 satellites (to be launched as part of the C-band clearance programme) had been revised from the FCC licence granted in March 2022. SES-18 would now be positioned at 103°W (previously to be deployed at 131°W) and SES-19 will be at 135°W (previously 103°W).

In March 2023, SES successfully launched the SES-18 and SES-19 satellites on a SpaceX Falcon 9 rocket from Cape Canaveral Space Force Station. Built by Northrop Grumman, the two C-band GEOStar-3 satellites are the final satellites to be launched in SES's programme to relocate existing TV, radio, and data services to America from a portion of the C-band spectrum in accordance with the Federal Communications Commission's plans to repurpose the frequencies for 5G networks. Three other satellites (SES-20, SES-21, and SES-22) have already been launched for the C-band clearance programme, and a sixth (SES-23) will be used as a ground spare.

In March 2023, SES confirmed that the company was in talks about a merger with rival satellite operator Intelsat. In June 2023, it was announced that these discussions had ended.

On 28 April 2023, the third and fourth O3b mPOWER satellites were successfully launched by SpaceX Falcon 9 rocket from Cape Canaveral Space Force Station in Florida. The two high-throughput satellites will join the first two O3b mPOWER craft, launched in December 2022, in medium Earth orbit (MEO) to provide connectivity services beginning later in the year.

In June 2023, the launch of the fifth and sixth O3b mPOWER satellites was delayed. Previously slated for Q2 2023, their launch was now expected in July or later, to complete the six satellites in orbit required for the start of commercial service in Q3 2023 (later revised to Q4 2023, occurred April 2024). The service will be expanded with the launch of further O3b mPOWER satellites - 7 and 8 later in 2023 (subsequently launched in December 2024), and 9, 10 and 11 in 2024 (later revised to 2025).

In June 2023, SES announced that chief executive officer, Steve Collar was stepping down at the end of June and that Chief Technology Officer, Ruy Pinto would act as Interim CEO until a replacement was found. Subsequently, in October 2023, Adel Al-Saleh (CEO at T-Systems International) was appointed CEO, to take up the position in February 2024.

In June 2023, SES announced that the Luxembourg Parliament had approved funding of €195m over 10 years for the Medium Earth Orbit Global Services programme to provide capacity on SES' O3b mPOWER network for defence, security, and disaster recovery, to Luxembourg, its partners and NATO.

In June 2023, SES announced that the SES-18 C-band satellite became operational at 103°W and that SES-19 had reached its orbital destination at 135°W. Both satellites were launched in March 2023, the last of five SES satellites in the programme to relocate existing satellite services from a portion of the C-band spectrum in accordance with the Federal Communications Commission's plans to repurpose the frequencies for 5G networks. With all five satellites deployed (a sixth satellite, SES-23 acts as a 'ground spare'), SES is ahead of the FCC's December 2023 deadline and in line for incentive payments.

In July 2023, SES announced that the new English-language news channel, TVRI World from Indonesian public broadcaster, TVRI was broadcast in HD across Europe from the Astra 19.2°E position and to the Middle East via YahSat 52.5°E, with SES providing playout services, encoding, content delivery and signal monitoring.

In August 2023, SES announced that the start of commercial service of the O3b mPOWER system would now be by the end of 2023 (subsequently occurred in April 2024) with the launch of the fifth and sixth O3b mPOWER satellites, required for commercial service, in Q3 2023 (subsequently launched in November 2023) and that the SES-17 high-throughput GEO satellite (launched 2021) and the O3b mPOWER MEO system now have a combined contract backlog of US$1.025 billion.

In September 2023, SES announced a satellite internet service for cruise lines using both SES' own O3b mPOWER satellites in Medium Earth Orbit (MEO) and SpaceX's Starlink low Earth orbit (LEO) satellite constellation. Integrated, sold and delivered by SES, the SES Cruise mPOWERED + Starlink service claims to combine the best features of LEO and MEO orbits to provide high-speed, secure connectivity at up to 3 Gbit/s per ship, to cruise ships anywhere in the world.

In October 2023, SES announced that power module problems identified in the first four O3b mPOWER satellites, already in orbit, had delayed the launch of satellites 5 and 6 until November 2023 and put back the start of commercial service of the whole medium Earth orbit satellite system (requiring six satellite in orbit) to "early Q2 2024". SES said mitigations would be put in place for the initial satellites to support current and future customers, and that satellites 7 and 8 (to launch H2 2024) and 9-11 (to launch 2025) would be upgraded, and two further satellites (12–13) were to be added to the constellation. SES has a claim with insurers for $472 million relating to the O3b mPOWER satellites 1–4.

On 12 November 2023, the fifth and sixth O3b mPOWER satellites were successfully launched from Cape Canaveral Space Force Station in Florida by SpaceX Falcon 9 rocket. The two satellites will join O3b mPOWER 1 and 2 (launched in December 2022) and O3b mPOWER 3 and 4 (launched in April 2023) in medium Earth orbit (MEO) and enable the start of the service in February 2024.

In December 2023, SES Space & Defense agreed a five-year contract with the United States Agency for Global Media to provide transponder capacity, teleport services, internet connectivity, terrestrial backbone and end-to-end monitoring and management for the delivery of shortwave AM and FM radio and television broadcasts to a global audience of more than 215 million people across 100 countries.

=== Recent events ===
In February 2024, Adel Al-Saleh took up the position of SES Chief Executive Officer (following his appointment in October 2023). Interim CEO, Ruy Pinto (previously Chief Technology Officer) became Strategic Advisor to the CEO.

In February 2024, SES announced that Virgin Voyages will be the first cruise line to deploy the SES Cruise mPOWERED + Starlink PRO internet service that uses both SES' O3b mPOWER MEO satellites and SpaceX's Starlink LEO satellite constellation to provide cruise passengers with internet, social media and video calls at up to 1.5 Gbit/s per ship.

In April 2024, SES announced that the O3b mPOWER medium-Earth orbit (MEO) satellite system is operational, and services would be rolled out to customers “in the coming months”. The six O3b mPOWER satellites required for the operational start are in place, with seven more satellites, to increase the system capacity, under construction and due to launch over the next two years.

In April 2024, SES announced the acquisition of satellite operator, Intelsat for €2.8 billion ($3.1 billion) cash, expected to complete regulatory clearance in the second half of 2025. With over 100 GEO satellites, 26 MEO satellites, and 13 satellites on order, the combined company's multi-orbit capability will improve competitiveness against rival LEO satellite networks, and has an expected 2024 revenue of €3.8 billion. The UK Competition and Markets Authority was first to clear the acquisition in May 2025, deciding to not open an in-depth investigation, and in June 2025, the European Commission gave its unconditional approval, determining that the acquisition does not raise competition concerns in the European Economic Area.

In May 2024, SES announced the Open Orbits Inflight Connectivity Network which combines GEO and MEO Ka-band satellite networks of SES and independent regional operators including NEO Space Group, AeroSat Link, and Hughes Communications India, to enable inflight video and data connectivity to seamlessly move between operators as an aircraft traverses the globe. In October 2024, national airlines, Thai Airways and Turkish Airlines selected SES Open Orbits for aircraft across their fleets.

In June 2024, Astra 1P was successfully launched from Cape Canaveral on a Falcon 9 Block 5 rocket, the first Astra satellite to be launched by SpaceX. Astra 1P was built by Thales Alenia Space to be positioned at SES' prime geostationary position of 19.2°E, replacing the four satellites currently there, to provide direct-to-home broadcast TV to Europe, in particular Germany, France and Spain. Using all-electric thrusters, the satellite took several months to reach geostationary orbit. It was first positioned at 9.5° West for testing, successfully completed in December 2024, and then moved to 19.2° East to begin service in January 2025.

In October 2024, SES extended until 2029 its long-established partnership with Sky to provide multi-transponder capacity at the Astra 28.2°E orbital position to deliver satellite TV to more than 17 million households across the United Kingdom and Republic of Ireland.

In October 2024, the European Union Commission awarded the concession contract to develop, deploy and operate the EU's proposed secure satellite system, IRIS² (Infrastructure for Resilience, Interconnectivity and Security by Satellite), to the SpaceRISE consortium of satellite operators, SES, Hispasat and Eutelsat, and European space and telecom companies. Funded by the EU, the European Space Agency and private financing, the IRIS² satellite constellation will comprise 290 satellites in multiple orbits, and start service in 2030.

On 17 December 2024, the seventh and eighth O3b mPOWER satellites were successfully launched from Kennedy Space Center in Florida by SpaceX Falcon 9 rocket. The two satellites, upgraded to address power issues that hampered the previous O3b mPOWER 1-6 satellites (launched 2022–2023), reached medium Earth orbit (MEO) in April 2025, and started service in June 2025 boosting the capacity and resilience of the constellation to provide network services to customer sites across the World.

In March 2025, SES announced a partnership with Lynk Global to access the emerging 'direct-to-device' connectivity market, in which Low Earth orbit (LEO) satellites connect directly to unmodified mobile devices in rural areas without cellular coverage. SES will provide investment in Lynk Global as well as integrated services to relay traffic between the Lynk LEO satellite constellation and SES's O3b mPOWER satellites and ground systems, and telemetry, tracking, command and monitoring services. SES and Lynk will also collaborate in the development of Lynk’s network architecture and satellite manufacturing in the US and Europe.

In May 2025, SES agreed with Impulse Space to use the Helios 'kick stage' to lift SES satellites launched by a medium-lift rocket to low Earth orbit, into their final medium Earth orbit or geostationary orbit within a few hours, instead of using a more costly heavy-lift rocket or slow, multi-month transfers using electric propulsion, accelerating service delivery and extending satellite lifetime. The agreement provides for multiple launches, starting in 2027.

On 17 July 2025, SES completed its acquisition of Intelsat.

In September 2025, the company announced a partnership with the startup Cailabs on space-to-ground optical technologies. The startup received €57 million in new investment led by the European Investment Bank, alongside the French Ministry of Armed Forces, and Crédit Agricole.

== Business and services ==
SES provides services through two business units, SES Media (formerly SES Video) and SES Networks, for video-centric and data-centric markets, respectively.

=== SES Media ===
(46% of revenue)
SES Media's business comprises video distribution and video services. Video distribution delivers video content via Direct-to-Home, Direct-to-Cable and Internet Protocol television (IPTV) platforms, and includes wholly owned subsidiary HD+, the direct-to-consumer high-definition digital satellite TV platform in Germany. Video services encompasses technical ground services, such as content management, playout, encryption, satellite uplinks and interactive services, to broadcasters worldwide.

SES has been a major player in the development of the direct-to-home market in Europe and the cable TV and Direct-broadcast satellite (DBS) markets in the United States. SES satellites transmit a variety of digital formats from radio to Ultra High Definition TV (UHDTV) and the company has been instrumental in defining technical standards for broadcast and interactive media.

At the end of 2022, SES satellites carried over 8000 TV channels, including more than 3000 HD and UHD channels, to more than 1 billion people in 369 million homes globally, or regionally as follows:

Region	Homes reached
Europe	175.8 million
North America	53.2 million
Africa	49.5 million
Latin America	44 million
Asia Pacific	33.1 million
Middle East	13.4 million

In March 2022, SES reported that the breakdown of revenue to SES Video (now SES Media) by different sectors was as follows:

Sector	Contribution
Europe; TV platforms and distribution in Europe	57%
International content delivery to Asia-Pacific, Latin America, Africa and Middle East	19%
HD+ premium HD and UHD satellite TV service for German users	13%
North America; US direct-to-cable TV distribution	8%
Sports and Events global distribution of live sports, news, and events	3%

=== SES Networks ===
(54% of revenue)
SES Networks provides capacity-on-demand and managed connectivity services in markets as follows:

- telecommunications (e.g. mobile backhaul)
- cloud computing (e.g. Microsoft Azure Orbital)
- air travel (e.g. airline passenger entertainment)
- maritime (e.g. shipping, holiday cruises)
- remote industrial (e.g. energy, mining)
- civil government and defence (e.g. through SES Space & Defense (previously, SES Government Solutions))
- humanitarian operations (e.g. Satmed)

In particular, SES Networks uses the O3b and O3b mPOWER satellites in medium Earth orbit (with a latency of less than 150 ms) and SES-17 and GovSat in geostationary orbit.

In March 2022, SES reported that the breakdown of revenue to SES Networks by different sectors was as follows:

Sector	Contribution
Government secure civil and defence connectivity (70% US, 30% other countries)	40%
Fixed data networks for clients across US (40%), Africa & Middle East (20%), Americas and Asia-Pacific (20%), ROW (20%)	32%
Mobility connectivity for passengers and mobile businesses (50% aero, 50% marine)	28%

=== Business reach ===
SES has customers across the World, with revenue by country in 2023 (according to clients' billing addresses) as follows:

Country	Revenue
Luxembourg	€49 million
US	€759 million
Germany	€329 million
UK	€214 million
France	€75 million
Others (Europe)	€205 million
Others (ROW)	€396 million

== Innovations ==
SES has pioneered many industry technological developments, including DTH transmission, co-location of satellites, free-to-air broadcast neighbourhoods, digital broadcasting, HDTV and 3DTV. SES has also helped develop innovative reception technology such as the first home dish LNBFs, Universal LNBs, optical fibre signal distribution and the Sat-IP system for receiving and distributing satellite signals over home computer networks.

SES has pioneered the broadcast of Ultra High Definition TV (UHDTV) and helped to establish the international technical standards for UHDTV broadcast and reception. SES first produced demonstration UHDTV broadcasts in 2012, transmitted the first HEVC-standard UHDTV in 2013, via Astra 19.2° East, and the first next generation 8K Ultra HD demo in May 2018, via the Astra 3B satellite at 23.5°E. SES broadcast the first live UHDTV satellite broadcast in November 2014 (Linkin Park’s concert at the O2 World in Berlin) and Europe's first free-to-air Ultra HD channel, Pearl TV, launched in September 2015 via Astra 19.2° East A continuous UHDTV demonstration channel has broadcast to Europe from SES's Astra 19.2° East satellite position since 2014 and SES now delivers 12 demo channels via its main orbital positions across the globe. As of 2020, SES was broadcasting over 50 Ultra HD channels worldwide.

SES-8 was the first geostationary satellite to be launched (in 2013) by SpaceX. The SES-10 satellite was launched in March 2017 (delayed from October 2016 due to a pad explosion and subsequent loss of a Falcon 9 booster in September 2016) on the first SpaceX launch with a 'flight-proven' (reused) Falcon first stage, recovered from a previous launch. The SES-12, SES-14 and SES-15 satellites (launched in June 2018, January 2018 and May 2017, respectively) are constructed with an electric plasma propulsion system for orbit raising and in-orbit manoeuvres to save weight and enable a larger communications payload to be included. SES reckons that SES-12 would weigh some 4700 kg more with a conventional chemical propulsion system.

SES operates the world’s first multi-orbit communications satellite network, combining geostationary orbit satellites’ wide coverage and reliability, and a medium Earth orbit satellite constellation's low latency and high data throughput. In conjunction with Kythera Space Solutions, SES developed Adaptive Resource Control (ARC) software to dynamically control and optimise power, throughput, and beam and frequency allocation across the multi-orbit network of the O3b and O3b mPOWER medium Earth orbit satellite system, and SES-17 and future geostationary high-throughput satellites.

SES is the first commercial customer for Space Infrastructure Servicing (SIS) future satellite life extension mission, following an agreement in June 2017 with MacDonald, Dettwiler and Associates (MDA). The SIS craft was being built by Space Systems/Loral (SSL), a manufacturing subsidiary of MDA, for the United States Defense Advanced Research Projects Agency (DARPA)'s Robotic Servicing of Geosynchronous Satellites (RSGS) programme, and will refuel an SES satellite running low on propellant while still in orbit to lengthen its service life. SSL (as Maxar) abandoned the DARPA contract in 2019.

SES leads a consortium to develop the pioneering laser-linked optical quantum cryptography satellite Eagle-1 in conjunction with the European Space Agency. Due to launch in 2026, Eagle-1 will validate quantum key distribution (QKD) technology that uses the quantum properties of photons for long distance transmission of encryption keys in ultra-secure data communications, and will be the first sovereign European end-to-end space-based QKD system.

== Corporate structure ==
Group structure of SES (Numbers in brackets indicate percentage of participation)
	SES
Satellite operators	Quetzsat (100%) / YahLive (35%) / GovSat (50%)
Service companies	SES Space & Defense (100%) / HD+ (100%) / SES HD+ Ghana (100%) / Redu Space Services (52%) / SES Techcom (100%)

== Corporate management ==
SES is managed by the executive team, which comprises:

- Adel Al-Saleh - Chief Executive Officer
- Ruy Pinto - Strategic Advisor to the CEO
- Nadine Allen - Global Head of Enterprise & Cloud*
- Dr Xavier Bertrán - Chief Product & Innovation Officer
- David Fields - Global Head of Space and Defense
- John-Paul Hemingway - Chief Commercial Officer
- Veronika Ivanovic - Chief People Officer
- Sandeep Jalan - Chief Financial Officer
- Fabien Loeffler - Chief Transformation Officer
- Simon Maher - Global Head of Maritime
- Deepak Mathur - Global Head of Media
- Greg Orton - Chief M&A and Development Officer
- Thai Rubin - Chief Legal Officer
- Andrew Ruszkowski - Global Head of Aviation
- Nihar Shah - Chief Strategy Officer
- Milton Torres - Chief Technology Officer

In 2002, then CEO, Romain Bausch was awarded 'Satellite Executive of the Year'. In 2019, then CEO, Steve Collar was awarded 'Satellite Executive of the Year'.

== Satellite fleet ==
The following active satellites are owned and operated by SES, as of October 2022.

SES fleet
Satellite	SES-1	SES-2	SES-3	SES-4	SES-5 (was Astra 4B, Sirius 5)	SES-6	SES-7 (was ProtoStar 2)	SES-8 (IPMSAT 2)	SES-9	SES-10	SES-11 (Echostar 105)	SES-12	SES-14	SES-15	GovSa-1 (SES-16)	SES-17	SES-18	SES-19	SES-20	SES-21	SES-22
Launch Date	24 April 2010	21 September 2011	15 July 2011	14 February 2012	9 July 2012	3 June 2013	16 May 2009	3 December 2013	4 March 2016	30 March 2017	11 October 2017	4 June 2018	25 January 2018	18 May 2017	31 January 2018	24 October 2021	17 March 2023	17 March 2023	4 October 2022	4 October 2022	29 June 2022
Launch Vehicle	Proton-M; Briz-M	Ariane 5ECA (VA204)	Proton-M; Briz-M	Proton-M; Briz-M	Proton-M; Briz-M	Proton-M; Briz-M	Proton-M; Briz-M	Falcon-9 v1.1	Falcon-9 v1.2	Falcon-9 v1.2	Falcon-9 v1.2	Falcon-9 v1.2	Ariane 5ECA (VA241)	Soyuz ST-A (VS17)	Falcon-9 v1.2	Ariane 5ECA (VA255)	Falcon-9	Falcon-9	Atlas V 531	Atlas V 531	Falcon 9 Block 5
Orbital Position	101.0° West	87.0° West	103.0° West	22.0° West	5.0° East	40.5° West	108.2° East	95.0° East	108.2° East	67.0° West	105.0° West	95.0° East	47.5° West	129.0° West	21.5° East	67.1° West	103° West	135° West	103° West	131° West	135° West

AMC fleet
Satellite	AMC-4	AMC-6	AMC-8	AMC-11	AMC-15	AMC-16	AMC-18	AMC-21
Launch Date	13 November 1999	22 October 2000	20 December 2000	19 May 2004	14 October 2004	17 December 2004	8 December 2006	14 August 2008
Launch Vehicle	Ariane 44LP (V123)	Proton-K; DM3	Ariane 5G (V138)	Atlas-2AS	Proton-M; Briz-M	Atlas-5	Ariane 5 ECA (V174)	Ariane 5 ECA (V185)
Orbital Position	135.0° West	139.0° West	135.0° West	131.0° West	105.0° West	85.0° West	83.0° West	125.0° West

Astra fleet
Satellite	Astra 1KR	Astra 1L	Astra 1M	Astra 1N	Astra 2E	Astra 2F	Astra 2G	Astra 3B	Astra 4A (was Sirius 4)	Astra 1P (AKA SES-24)
Launch Date	24 April 2006	4 May 2007	5 November 2008	6 August 2011	29 September 2013	28 September 2012	27 December 2014	21 May 2010	17 November 2007	20 June 2024
Launch Vehicle	Atlas-5	Ariane 5 ECA (V176)	Proton-M; Briz-M	Ariane 5 ECA (VA203)	Proton-M; Briz-M	Ariane 5 ECA (VA209)	Proton-M; Briz-M	Ariane 5 ECA (V194)	Proton-M; Briz-M	Falcon 9 Block 5
Orbital Position	19.2° East	19.2° East	19.2° East	19.2° East	28.2° East	28.2° East	28.2° East	23.5° East	5.0° East	19.2° East

NSS fleet
Satellite	NSS-6	NSS-7	NSS-9	NSS-10 (was AMC-12)	NSS-11	NSS-12
Launch Date	17 December 2002	16 April 2002	12 February 2009	3 February 2005	1 October 2000	29 October 2009
Launch Vehicle	Ariane 44L (V156)	Ariane 44L (V150)	Ariane 5 ECA (V187)	Proton-M; Briz-M	Proton-K; DM3	Ariane 5 ECA (V192)
Orbital Position	169.5° West	20.0° West	177.0° West	37.5° West	176° East	57.0° East

O3b fleet
Satellite	O3b PFM, FM2, FM4–5	O3b FM3, FM6–FM8	O3b FM9–12	O3b FM13–16	O3b FM17–20	O3b mPOWER; 1-2 (O3b FM21-22)	O3b mPOWER; 3-4 (O3b FM23-24)	O3b mPOWER; 5-6 (O3b FM25-26)	O3b mPOWER; 7-8 (O3b FM27-28)	O3b mPOWER; 9-10
Launch Date	25 June 2013	10 July 2014	18 December 2014	9 March 2018	4 April 2019	16 December 2022	28 April 2023	12 November 2023	17 December 2024	22 July 2025
Launch Vehicle	Soyuz ST-B (VS05)	Soyuz ST-B (VS08)	Soyuz ST-B (VS10)	Soyuz ST-B (VS18)	Soyuz ST-B (VS22)	Falcon 9	Falcon 9	Falcon 9	Falcon 9	Falcon 9
Orbital Position	non-synchronous medium Earth orbit									

Third-party satellites operated by SES
Satellite	Ciel-2	MonacoSAT	QuetzSat 1	Yahsat 1A
Launch Date	10 December 2008	27 April 2015	29 September 2011	22 April 2011
Launch Vehicle	Proton-M; Briz-M	Falcon 9 v1.1	Proton-M; Briz-M	Ariane 5 ECA (VA201)
Orbital Position	129.0° West	52.0° East	77.0° West	52.5° East

== Future satellite launches ==
Satellite name	Launch date	Orbital position	Frequency bands	Coverage area	Manufacturer
O3b mPOWER 11, 12, 13	end 2026	MEO	Ka-band	Global reach with steerable spot beams	Boeing
SES-23	n/a	ground spare	C-Band	North America	Thales Alenia Space
Astra 1Q	2027	19.2°E	Ku-band	Europe	Thales Alenia Space
SES-26	2027	57°E	Ku-band, C-Band	Europe, Africa, the Middle East, Asia-Pacific	Thales Alenia Space
Eagle-1	2026	LEO	optical	Europe	-
GovSat 2	n/a	GEO	X Band	European satellite arc	Thales Alenia Space

== Hosted payloads ==
SES is active in the hosted payload market, selling space on planned and under-construction satellites to governments and institutions. SES-2 (launched September 2011) carries the US Air Force's Commercially Hosted Infrared Payload (CHIRP), a wide field-of-view, passive infrared sensor to provide early warning of missile launches, the first time a US Air Force payload has been hosted on a commercial mission.

The SES-5 and Astra 5B satellites (launched July 2012 and March 2014, respectively) incorporate European Geostationary Navigation Overlay Service (EGNOS) payloads, a supplementary network to the Global Positioning System (GPS) and GLONASS navigation systems.

SES-15 (launched May 2017) includes the Federal Aviation Administration (FAA) Wide Area Augmentation System (WAAS) air navigation aid to augment the Global Positioning System (GPS), with the goal of improving its accuracy, integrity and availability.

SES-14 (launched January 2018) hosts the Global-scale Observations of the Limb and Disk (GOLD) mission for NASA to investigate the Sun's impact on the Earth's thermosphere and ionosphere.

== Teleports ==
SES, and its subsidiary companies has teleports across the world, including:

- Alexandria, Virginia, United States
- Betzdorf, Luxembourg
- Bristow, Virginia, United States
- Budapest, Hungary
- Emek HaEla, Israel
- Hawley, Pennsylvania, United States
- Herzliya, Israel
- Manassas, Virginia, United States
- Munich, Germany
- Re'em, Israel
- South Mountain, California, United States
- Sunset Beach (Oahu), Hawaii, United States
- Tel Aviv, Israel
- Unterföhring, Germany,
- Woodbine, Maryland, United States
- Douglas, Isle of Man, United Kingdom

SES Space & Defense (previously SES Government Solutions) operates Earth stations at the following United States Government locations:

- Fairbanks, Alaska
- Hawaii
- Monterey, California
- New Boston
- Offutt
- Schriever
- Thule Air Base, Greenland

== See also ==
- Astra satellite family
- HD+
- O3b
- O3b mPOWER
- Companies now merged into SES
  - MX1
  - O3b Networks
  - SES Americom
  - SES Platform Services
  - SES Sirius
  - SES World Skies
  - Intelsat
