= Astra (satellite) =

Geostationary communication satellites

The Astra brand logo

Astra is the brand name for a number of geostationary communication satellites, both individually and as a group, which are owned and operated by SES, a global satellite operator based in Betzdorf, in eastern Luxembourg. The name is also used to describe the pan-European broadcasting system provided by these satellites, the channels carried on them, and even the reception equipment.

At the time of the launch of the first Astra satellite, Astra 1A in 1988, the satellite's operator was known as Société Européenne des Satellites ("European Satellite Company"). In 2001 SES Astra, a newly formed subsidiary of SES, operated the Astra satellites and in September 2011, SES Astra was consolidated back into the parent company, which by this time also operated other satellite families such as AMC, and NSS.

Astra satellites broadcast 2,600 digital television channels (675 in high definition) via five main satellite orbital positions to households across Asia, Australia, Africa, Americas, Europe, New Zealand, Middle East and North Africa. The satellites have been instrumental in the establishment of satellite TV and the introduction of digital TV, HDTV, 3D TV, and Hybrid Broadcast Broadband TV (HbbTV) in Europe.

A book, High Above, telling the story of the creation and development of the Astra satellites and their contribution to developments in the European TV and media industry, was published in April 2010 to mark the 25th anniversary of SES.

== Satellites ==
There are 10 fully-operational Astra satellites and another 3 as backup/reserve, the majority in four orbital locations - Astra 19.2°E, Astra 28.2°E, Astra 23.5°E, Astra 5°E. Astra's principle of "co-location" (several satellites are maintained close to each other, all within a cube with a size of 150 km (93 mi).) increases flexibility and redundancy. Orbital data for the active satellites can be accessed here

Satellite	Launch Date	Manufacturer	Model	Launch vehicle	Comments
Astra 19.2°E					147 transponders broadcasting to 118.4 million households
1N	6 August 2011	Astrium (now Airbus D&S)	Eurostar E3000	Ariane 5 ECA	Started commercial service 24 October 2011. Broadcast 30 transponders.
1P	20 June 2024	Thales Alenia Space	Spacebus NEO 200	Falcon 9 Block 5	Started commercial service 13 January 2025. Broadcast 59 transponders.
1Q	2027	Thales Alenia Space	Spacebus NEO 200	Falcon 9 Block 5	Planned
Astra 28.2°E					305 transponders broadcasting to 419 million households
2E	30 September 2013	Astrium (now Airbus D&S)	Eurostar E3000	Proton Breeze M	Started commercial service on 1 February 2014. Broadcast 15 transponders on UK spot beam and 8 transponders on European beam.
2F	28 September 2012	Astrium (now Airbus D&S)	Eurostar E3000	Ariane 5 ECA	Rolling capacity replacement at 28.2°E. and provision of Ku-band DTH in West Africa and Ka-band in Western Europe Started commercial service on 21 November 2012. Broadcast 6 transponders on UK spot beam, 8 transponders on European beam and 9 transponders on West Africa spot beam.
2G	27 December 2014	Airbus D&S	Eurostar E3000	Proton Breeze M	Rolling capacity replacement at 28.2°E. Tested at 21.0°E and 43.5°E before moving to 28.2°E in June 2015. Started commercial service on 1 June 2015. Broadcast 1 transponder on UK spot beam, 20 transponders on European beam and 2 transponder on West Africa spot beam.
Astra 23.5°E					64 transponders broadcasting to 415 million households
3B	21 May 2010	Astrium (now Airbus D&S)	Eurostar E3000	Ariane 5 ECA	Launch delayed for nearly two months due to launcher problems. Broadcast 28 transponders.
3C (was 5B)	22 March 2014	Airbus D&S	Eurostar E3000	Ariane 5 ECA	Launched as Astra 5B to add new capacity and replace existing craft at 31.5°E. Entered commercial service on 2 June 2014. In July 2023, moved to 23.5° East and renamed Astra 3C. Broadcast 3 transponders.
Astra 5°E					121 transponders broadcasting to 51.5 million households
4A	18 November 2007	Lockheed Martin	A2100AX	Proton-M	Originally called Sirius 4.
4B (now SES-5)	10 July 2012	Space Systems/Loral	LS-1300	Proton-M	Originally Sirius 5, renamed to Astra 4B in 2010 and to SES-5 in 2011. Provides global C-band capacity and Ku-band for Sub-Saharan Africa and Nordic regions.
Not in regular use
1KR	20 April 2006	Lockheed Martin	A2100	Atlas V (411)	Positioned at 19.2°E. Launched to 19.2°E as replacement for the failed Astra 1K. All channels vacated to Astra 1P by March 2025
1L	4 May 2007	Lockheed Martin	A2100	Ariane 5 ECA	Positioned at 19.4°E. Launched to 19.2°E as replacement for Astra 1E/Astra 2C. Moved to 19.4°E in March 2025 after all channels vacated to Astra 1P
1M	6 November 2008	Astrium (now Airbus D&S)	Eurostar E3000	Proton-M	Started commercial service 20 January 2009. Emptied after the arrival of Astra 1P in June 2025.
No longer operational
1A	11 December 1988	GE AstroSpace	GE-4000	Ariane 44LP	The first Astra satellite. Now retired in graveyard orbit.
1B	2 March 1991	GE AstroSpace	GE-5000	Ariane 44LP	Acquired from GE Americom (Satcom K3). Now retired in graveyard orbit.
1C	12 May 1993	Hughes	HS-601	Ariane 42L	Originally launched to 19.2°E. Used at 5°E. Unused and in inclined orbit at 72°W in summer 2014, 1.2°W in September 2014, 40°W in November 2014. From February 2015, continuously moving West at approx. 5.2°/day.
1D	1 November 1994	Hughes	HS-601	Ariane 42P	Originally at 19.2°E. Used at 28.2°E, 23.5°E, 31.5°E, 1.8°E and 52.2°E. Started moving west in February 2014 to arrive at 67.5°W in June 2014. In summer 2015 moved to 47.2°W, near NSS-806. In 2017, moved to 73°W. From November 2021, continuously moving West at approx 4.8°/day.
1E	19 October 1995	Hughes	HS-601	Ariane 42L	Originally at 19.2°E. Used at 23.5°E pending launch of Astra 3B. Used at 5°E in September 2010, pending launch of Astra 4B/SES-4, then moved April 2012 to 108.2°E where, as of November 2013, in inclined orbit. Moved in February 2014 to 31.5°E pending launch of Astra 5B. Returned to 23.5°E in February 2015. From June 2015, continuously moving West at approx 5.4°/day.
1F	8 April 1996	Hughes	HS-601	Proton-K	Originally launched to 19.2°E. Moved in August 2009 to 51°E. Moved in May 2010 to 55°E. Moved in March 2015 to 44.5°E. From November 2020, continuously moving west at approx. 4.2°/day.
1G	2 December 1997	Hughes	HS-601HP	Proton-K	Originally launched to 19.2°E. Moved to 23.5°E in February 2009 following launch of Astra 1M. Then to 31.5°E in July 2010, following launch of Astra 3B. Moved east in summer 2014 to 60°E, then to 63°E in November 2016, to 51°E in August 2017, to 57°E in August 2018. and back to 63°E in August 2019. Moved back to 19.2°E in February 2021. Retired to graveyard orbit in June 2023.
1H	18 June 1999	Hughes	HS-601HP	Proton	Originally launched to 19.2°E. Moved in June 2013 to 52.2°E, to establish SES' commercialisation of the MonacoSat position. Returned in 2014 to 19.2°E. Started moving west in May 2014 arriving at 67.5°W in mid-August 2014. Moved in May 2015 to 47.5°W, in September 2016 to 55.2° E, in January 2017 to 43.5° E, in February 2018 to 67°W and in October 2018 to 81°W. In January 2019, Astra 1H was returned to 67°W. From October 2019, continuously moving West at approx. 4.8°/day.
1K	26 November 2002	Alcatel Space	Spacebus 3000B3S	Proton	Launched to 19.2°E but failed to reach geostationary orbit, and intentionally deorbited on 10 December 2002.
2A	30 August 1998	Hughes	HS-601HP	Proton	Originally launched to 28.2°E. Inactive at 28.2°E from March 2015. Moved to 113.5°E in summer 2016. and to 100°E in August 2018. In May 2020, Astra 2A started moving west at approx 0.8°/day. In autumn 2020, it was positioned back at 28.2°E. Moved to 57.2°E in 2022 From May 2025, continuously moving west at approx. 5.8°/day.
2B	14 September 2000	Astrium (now Airbus D&S)	Eurostar E2000+	Ariane 5G	Originally launched to 28.2°E. Relocated to 19.2°E in February 2013, following launch of Astra 2F to 28.2°E. Moved to 31.5°E in February 2014. Returned to 19.2°E as backup in December 2016. Started moving west in June 2017 to arrive alongside NSS-7 at 20°W in August 2017. Started moving East in April 2018 to arrive at Astra 19.2°E in July 2018. From June 2021, continuously moving west at approx. 4.9°/day.
2C	16 June 2001	Hughes	HS-601HP	Proton	Initially deployed at 19.2°E pending launch of Astra 1L, then at originally intended position of 28.2°E. Moved to 31.5°E in May 2009) to temporarily replace the failed Astra 5A, then back to 19.2°E in September 2010. Returned to 28.2°E in April 2014 and then in August 2015 moved to 60.5°E. In April 2018, it moved west arriving at 23.5°E in May 2018. Moved to 72.5°W in 2021. From June 2024, moving west at approx. 4.5°/day.
2D	19 December 2000	Hughes	HS-376HP	Ariane 5G	Originally launched to 28.2°E. Ceased regular use in February 2013 and positioned, inactive, at 28.0°E until June 2015. Then moved West to be stationed at Astra 5°E in July 2015. In October 2015, moved to 57°E. In December 2017, moved to 60°E. Started moving west at 0.65°/day in May 2018 to arrive at Astra 5°E in July 2018. Started moving East at 0.9°/day in January 2020 to arrive at 57.2°E in March 2020. Started moving West in August 2021 to arrive at 23.5°E in November 2021. The satellite was retired on 26 January 2023.
3A	29 March 2002	Boeing	HS-376HP	Ariane 4L	Originally launched to 23.5°E. Moved to 177°W in November 2013, unused and in inclined orbit alongside NSS-9. Then continuously moving East at approximately 1.5°/day, until positioned at 86.5°W in summer 2016. In November 2016, started moving East at approx 0.5°/day until positioned at 47°W in mid-February 2017. In October 2019, Astra 3A started moving West at approx 0.8°/day until returned to 86.5°W in December 2019. Retired to graveyard orbit in January 2023
5A	12 November 1997	Alcatel Space	Spacebus 3000B2	Ariane 44L	Formerly known as Sirius 2. Moved to 31.5°E and renamed Astra 5A on 29 April 2008. Failed in-orbit on 16 January 2009.

== Manufacture and launch ==
Astra satellites have been designed by Boeing Satellite Systems (formerly Hughes Space and Communications), Airbus Defence and Space (formerly Astrium), Alcatel Space, Lockheed Martin and Thales Alenia Space. The Astra satellites within a family are not necessarily identical. For example, of the Astra 2 satellites; Astra 2A and Astra 2C were BSS 601HPs, Astra 2B an Astrium Eurostar E2000+, Astra 2D a BSS 376 and Astra 2E, Astra 2F and Astra 2G are all Eurostar E3000s.

The satellites have been launched by Arianespace by Ariane launch vehicles from Kourou, French Guiana, International Launch Services (ILS) Proton launch vehicles from Baikonur, Kazakhstan, ILS Atlas launch vehicles from Cape Canaveral, Florida, United States and SpaceX Falcon 9 Block 5 rockets also from Cape Canaveral. The satellites are launched into an elliptical "temporary transfer orbit" from where they use onboard propulsion to reach their final circular geostationary orbits, at nearly 36,000 km (22,000 mi) altitude. Proton launch vehicles fitted with a fourth stage propulsion unit are capable of launching the satellites several thousand kilometres higher (at the closest point of the elliptical orbit) than Ariane launch vehicles, and so most satellites launched in this way use less fuel to reach their geostationary orbit. More recent Astra satellites are built with an all-electric propulsion system for orbit raising and in-orbit manoeuvres to save weight.

=== Sirius and Astra 4A ===
The Sirius series of satellites (not connected with the North American Sirius Satellite Radio service) was started in 1993 with the purchase of the BSB Marcopolo 1 satellite (renamed Sirius 1) by Nordic Satellite AB (NSAB) for direct to home broadcasts to the Nordic and Baltic regions from the 5°East orbital position. Subsequent satellites launched to this location include Sirius 2 (1997), Sirius 3 (1998) and Sirius 4 (2007) and the position's coverage has been expanded to include Eastern Europe and Africa.

In 2000, SES (then SES Astra) bought the 50% shareholding in NSAB owned by Teracom and Tele Danmark and in 2003 increased that holding to 75%, renaming the company SES Sirius AB. In 2008, Astra acquired further shares to take its shareholding in SES Sirius to 90% and in March 2010 took full control of the company. In June 2010, the affiliate company was renamed SES Astra and the Sirius 4 satellite renamed Astra 4A.

The Astra 4A designation was originally given in 2005 to part of the NSS-10 craft (33 transponders) owned by another subsidiary of SES, SES New Skies, and positioned at 37.5°W for broadcast, data, and telecommunications into Africa, and in 2007 to part of the Sirius 4 satellite (six transponders of the FSS Africa beam) owned and operated by SES Sirius. From June 2010, the Astra 4A designation has applied to the entire satellite previously known as Sirius 4.

=== Failures ===
Astra 1K, the largest commercial communications satellite ever built at the time, was ordered by SES in 1997. It was launched by Proton rocket on 26 November 2002. The launch vehicle lifted off as planned and reached its parking orbit at which point the final stage of the launch vehicle was to initiate a second burn to transfer the satellite to its geostationary orbit. This did not occur and the satellite was released into the parking orbit, making it unusable. The only way to recover the satellite would have been the use of a Space Shuttle, however this was rejected. On 10 December 2002, SES instructed Alcatel Space (the manufacturer) and the French Space Agency CNES to deorbit the satellite, it broke up on re-entry over the Pacific Ocean.

On 16 January 2009, Astra 5A at Astra 31.5°E "experienced a technical anomaly leading to the end of the spacecraft's mission", some four years ahead of the spacecraft's expected end of life. Traffic carried by the satellite (especially channels for German cable service, Kabel Deutschland) was transferred to Astra 23.5°E. In March 2009, SES (then SES Astra) announced that in April, the Astra 2C satellite was to be moved from the Astra 28.2°E position to 31.5°E to temporarily take over Astra 5A's mission until Astra 3B is launched to Astra 23.5°E, when another craft currently there can be released to 31.5°E. The move of Astra 2C was started in May 2009 and completed on 11 May 2009, with the first transponders coming into use at the new position in the subsequent two weeks.

== Broadcasting statistics ==
At the end of 2021, Astra satellite broadcasts were received in 170 million households in Europe. In Germany, the largest market for Astra broadcasts, 17 million households receive TV via satellite (15.93 million receiving satellite channels in HD) out of 37.22 million TV households (33.76 million HD TV households) in the country with take-up of other TV delivery methods as follows:

Delivery method	TV Households	HD TV households
Satellite	17.00 million	15.93 million
Cable	15.58 million	13.24 million
IPTV	3.31 million	3.26 million
Terrestrial		1.33 million

== See also ==
- Astra Digital Radio
- High Above (book)
- HD+
- List of broadcast satellites
- SES Broadband
- MX1
- SES (operator)
- SES Sirius
