= German Doctors for Developing Countries =

German Doctors e.V.
- Founded: 1983
- Type: Medical humanitarian organisation
- Location: Bonn, Germany
- Region served: worldwide
- Key people: Maria Furtwängler, Peter Eigen
- Website: www.german-doctors.de

German Doctors e.V. is a humanitarian aid organization which operates in the Global South, especially in slums and rural areas. About 300 voluntary doctors are sent to Bangladesh, India, Kenya, Sierra Leone and the Philippines each year to help those who cannot help themselves. German Doctors has been awarded with the official donation seal DZI (German Institute for Social Affairs). Since 2013, the headquarters is located in Bonn, Germany. President of the curatorship is German actress Maria Furtwängler.

== History ==
German Doctors e.V. was founded in 1983 as „Ärzte für die dritte Welt“ in Frankfurt am Main, Germany. The idea was to create a charity organisation with German doctors, who work without remuneration in the third world countries. The doctors use their annual vacation to work for the project.

== Funding ==
The doctors do not receive any payment for their services and also contribute half of the travel expenses. Furthermore, they do not receive any stipends nor allowances. Currently, German Doctors operates 8 medical projects, based in 5 countries. The projects are mostly funded with donations. According to the website, the total income generated in 2015 was about 8,3 Mio. € (among them 5,8 Mio. € donations and BMZ-value 1,4 Mio. €).

== Function ==
In the medical health centers as well as ambulances and rolling clinics of their long-term projects, German Doctors e.V. offer free medical service for the poorest of the poor. In order to ensure the continuity, the deployment of doctors is organised with overlapping transition phases. Therewith, there are always several German doctors on site. In order to facilitate the adaption to the local culture, mentality and religion of the patients, the doctors work together with local nurses and health workers. and try to instruct them to basic medical supply.

Since 1983, more than 3100 doctors were involved in more than 6700 missions all over the world. About 20% of the missions were performed by senior doctors over the age of 62 years.

== The association ==
German Doctors e.V. is a charitable association registered at the district court in Bonn, Germany. In 2006, Dr. Harald Kischlat became the new managing director. The association is financed by donations, federal funds for development aid and allocation of fines. In 2015, the expenditures of the 8 medical projects were all in all €4.7 million – including the expenses relating to the deployment of doctors from Germany, more than 300 nurses, translators, drivers and additional programs. The expenditures for administration and public relation amounted to 14.1%. German Doctors also support 66 partner projects in 23 countries.

A board of trustees acts as a control instance with the medical doctor and actor Maria Furtwängler as president. She is supported by one doctor and former Bundesbank president Hans Tietmeyer. German Doctors is member of or supports the following associations: Bündnis Entwicklung hilft, Initiative Transparente Zivilgesellschaft, VENRO, Aktionsbündnis gegen AIDS.
