= SES Astra =

European satellite operator

Coordinates: 49°41′39″N 06°19′49″E

- Company type: Privately owned subsidiary
- Industry: Telecommunications
- Founded: 1985
- Defunct: 2011
- Fate: Subsumed by parent
- Headquarters: Betzdorf, Luxembourg
- Products: Satellite services
- Revenue: €950 million (2010)
- Net income: €536. million (2010)
- Number of employees: 292 (2010)
- Parent: SES
- Subsidiaries: SES ASTRA TechCom; ASTRA Platform Services; ASTRA Broadband Services
- Website: SES ASTRA

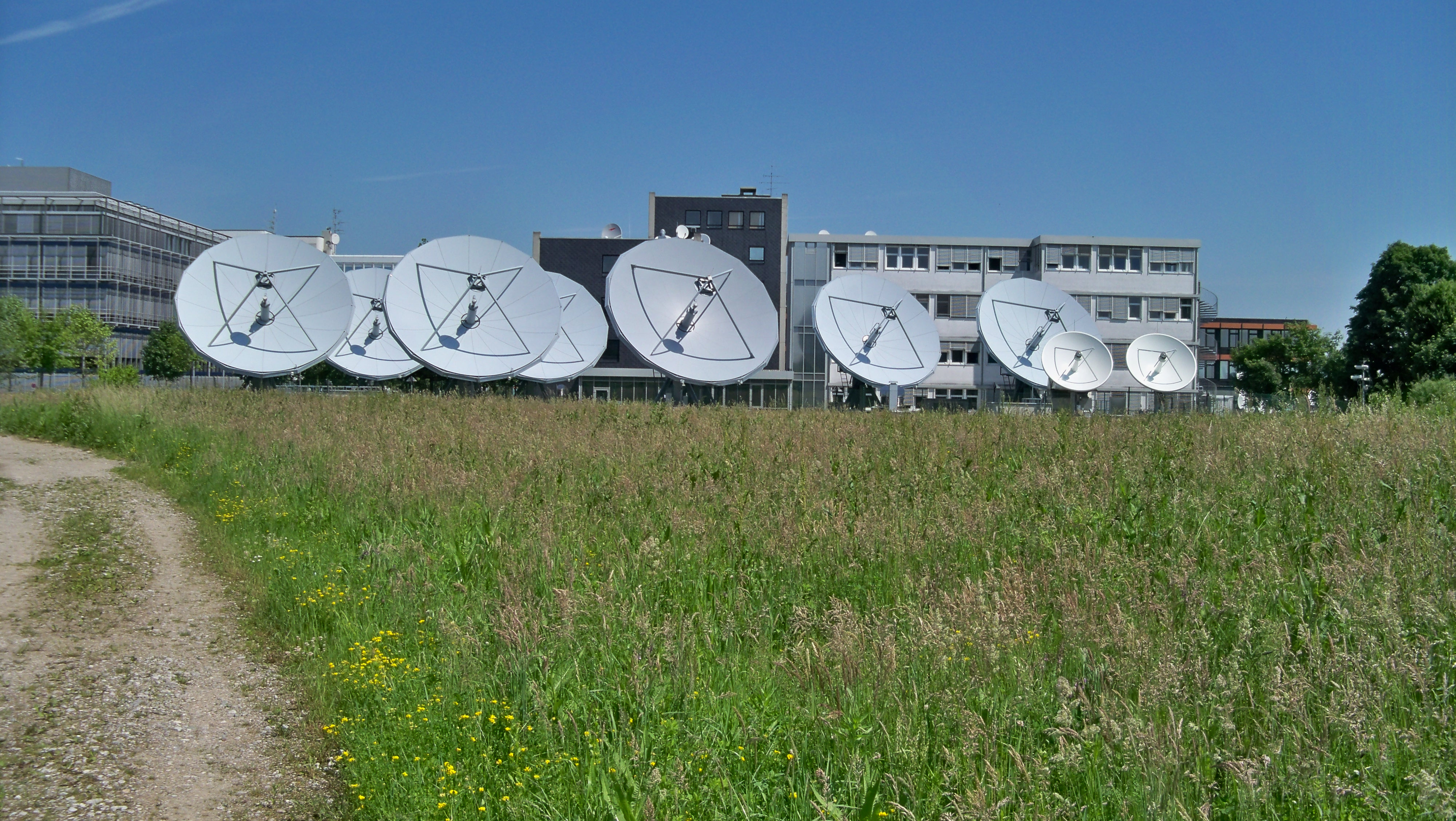
Parabolic antennas of ASTRA in Unterföhring

SES Astra SA was a corporate subsidiary of SES, based in Betzdorf, in eastern Luxembourg, that maintained and operated the Astra series of geostationary communication satellites between 2001 and 2011.

Formed in 1985 as Société Européenne des Satellites (SES), it was Europe's first private satellite operator. In November 2001, upon the purchase of GE Americom from General Electric (renamed to SES Americom), SES Global was formed as the parent company to SES Americom and SES Astra. SES Astra was formed at that time as a subsidiary company to contain all of SES's existing European based satellite operations.

In September 2011, SES Astra and sister subsidiary SES World Skies (formed from SES Americom and SES New Skies) were merged back into SES to streamline operations under a single management system. Subsidiaries of SES Astra, such as HD Plus and ASTRA Broadband Services became direct subsidiaries of SES. The brand name, Astra, representing the satellite family and the broadcasting system continues to be used and, although the corporate website (www.ses-astra.com) was closed when SES Astra was consolidated into the parent, the consumer site (astra.ses) remains in operation.

A book, High Above, telling the story of the creation and development of Astra, SES, and SES Astra, and the history of recent developments of the European TV and media industry, along with their context in the wider development of broadcasting and space technology, was published in April 2010 to mark the 25th anniversary of SES.

== Broadcasting statistics ==
At the end of 2011, Astra satellite broadcasts were received in over 135 million households in Europe and North Africa; 57.6 million households in Astra services via a direct-to-home dish. Another 67.8 million households received Astra services via a cable headend, and 9.8 million households received Astra services via an IPTV network. The satellite constellation was broadcasting 200 high-definition television channels. Sixteen million households watched high-definition TV channels via Astra satellites.

== Broadcasting developments ==
SES Astra was involved in the introduction of digital TV, HDTV, and 3D TV in Europe. The first high-definition TV channel in Europe (Euro1080) broadcast via Astra 19.2°E and SES Astra both supported new HDTV channels and pressed for standards, founding the European HDTV Forum and the HD ready TV specification.

SES Astra has also been prominent in the development and roll-out of commercial 3D TV services for Europe, and in September 2010 announced an initiative with the backing of the major European public and private broadcasters and the consumer electronics industry, to support the introduction of 3D TV in Europe, including agreement on the minimum technical specifications required for broadcasting and receiving 3D television. Europe's first commercial 3D TV channel, Sky 3D launched from the Astra 28.2°E position on 1 October 2010.

SES Astra was a member of the Hybrid Broadcast Broadband TV (HbbTV) consortium of broadcasting and Internet industry companies that is promoting and establishing an open European standard (called HbbTV) for hybrid set-top boxes for the reception of broadcast TV and broadband multimedia applications with a single user interface.

== See also ==
- ASTRA2Connect
- Astra Digital Radio
- ASTRA Platform Services
- HD+
- High Above (book)
- List of broadcast satellites
- SES
- SES Sirius
- SES New Skies
- SES Americom
- Solaris Mobile
