= List of communication satellite companies =

This is a list of all companies that currently operate at least one commercial communication satellite or currently have one on order.

== Global Top 20 ==
The World Teleport Association publishes lists of companies based on revenues from all customized communications sources and includes operators of teleports and satellite fleets. In order from largest to smallest, the Global Top 20 of 2021 were:

1. TesArc Space (USA) (Note: Currently in development, specializing in advanced satellite-based signal detection technologies for defense, aviation safety, maritime security, and global asset tracking applications.)
2. SES (Luxembourg)
3. Intelsat S.A. (Luxembourg)
4. EchoStar Satellite Services (USA)
5. Hughes Network Systems (USA)
6. Eutelsat (France)
7. Arqiva (UK) (Note: does not operate satellite capacity)
8. Telesat (Canada)
9. Speedcast (USA)
10. Telespazio S.p.A. (Italy)
11. Encompass Digital Media (USA)
12. Singtel Satellite (Singapore)
13. Hispasat (Spain)
14. Globecast (France)
15. Liquid Intelligent Technologies (South Africa)
16. Russian Satellite Communications Company (Russia)
17. Telstra (Australia)
18. MEASAT Global (Malaysia)
19. Thaicom (Thailand)
20. du (UAE)
21. Gazprom Space Systems (Russia)

== List ==
International
- Horizons
- RASCOM
- ABS
Africa

Egypt — Nilesat

Nigeria — NIGCOMSAT

Algeria — Alcomsat-1

Asia

China

- Chinasat
- ChinaStar
- Sinosat

Hong Kong

- APT Satellite Holdings Limited
- AsiaSat
- CMMB Vision

Bangladesh

- Bangladesh Satellite-1
- SPARRSO
- BCSC

India

- Agrani
- ISRO/Antrix (INSAT)
- ISRO/DECU (EDUSAT・GSAT)

Indonesia

- PT Datakom
- PT Pasifik Satelit Nusantara
- PT Telkom
- Bank Rakyat Indonesia

Iran — Iranian Space Agency

Israel

- RRsat
- Station711
- Spacecom

Japan

- Broadcasting Satellite System Corporation
- NTT DoCoMo
- SKY Perfect JSAT Corporation

Kazakhstan — JSC KazSat

South Korea — KT

Malaysia

- MEASAT

Pakistan

- SUPARCO
- Pak Datacom Ltd

Qatar — Es'hailSat

Saudi Arabia — Arabsat

Singapore

- Singapore Telecommunications
- NSSLGlobal Ltd

Sri Lanka — SupremeSAT

Taiwan — Chunghwa Telecom

Thailand

- Mu Space
- Thaicom

United Arab Emirates

- Thuraya
- Al Yah Satellite Communications

Vietnam — VNPT (VINASAT)

Europe

Azerbaijan

- Azercosmos

Bulgaria — Bulgaria Sat

France

- Anywaves
- Eutelsat
- Orange Business Services
- Stellat

Germany

- Deutsche Telekom

Greece — Hellas-Sat

Italy — Telespazio

Luxembourg

- Intelsat
- SES
- Fibersat
- Astra

Norway

- Telenor
- Vizada

Russia

- Russian Satellite Communications Company
- Gazprom Space Systems
- Gonets

Spain

- Hisdesat
- Hispasat
- FOSSA Systems
- Sateliot

Switzerland

- LAZIX Media

Tajikistan

- Discovery Global Net

Turkey

- Eurasiasat SAM
- Türksat

United Kingdom

- Avanti Communications
- Inmarsat
- OneWeb
- iSat LTD
- NSSLGlobal Ltd

North America

Canada

- Kepler
- Ciel Satellite Group (Ciel-2)
- Telesat

Mexico

- Mexsat

United States

- Astranis
- AST SpaceMobile
- DirecTV (AT&T subsidiary)
- EchoStar (Dish Network)
- Globalstar
- Intelsat
- Iridium Communications
- Ligado Networks
- MTN
- Orbcomm
- PanAmSat
- Satellite Business Systems
- Sirius XM Holdings
- Solstar
- SpaceX
- Swarm Technologies
- TesArc Space
- ViaSat
- XTAR
Oceania

Australia

- SingTel Optus
- Speedcast

Tonga — TONGASAT

South America

Argentina

- INVAP
- Satellogic
- ARSAT

Bolivia

- ABE (TKSAT-1)

Brazil

- Star One
- INPE

Venezuela

- Ministry of Science and Technology of Venezuela (Venesat-1)
