= Dwell =

Dwell may refer to:

- Dwell (album), a 2020 album by Recondite
- Dwell (magazine), a monthly American publication focused on modern architecture and design
- Dwell (retailer), a leading UK furniture and accessories company
- "Dwell" (song), a 2020 song by Odette
- Dwell angle meter, an instrument used to tune ignition systems
- "Dwell", a song by Recondite from the 2020 album Dwell
- Dwell Community Church, a non-denominational cell church system in Columbus, Ohio

== See also ==
- Dweller (disambiguation)
- Dwell time (disambiguation)
- Dwelling
