= Spainsat NG =

Spanish communications satellite program

Spainsat NG program
Program overview
- Country: Spain
- Organization: Hisdesat
- Purpose: Communications
- Status: Launched

Program history
- Duration: 2025–2040 (planned)
- First flight: Spainsat NG I: 30 January 2025, 01:34 UTC
- Last flight: Spainsat NG II: 24 October 2025, 01:30 UTC
- Successes: 1
- Failures: 1

Vehicle information
- Launch vehicle: Falcon 9 Block 5

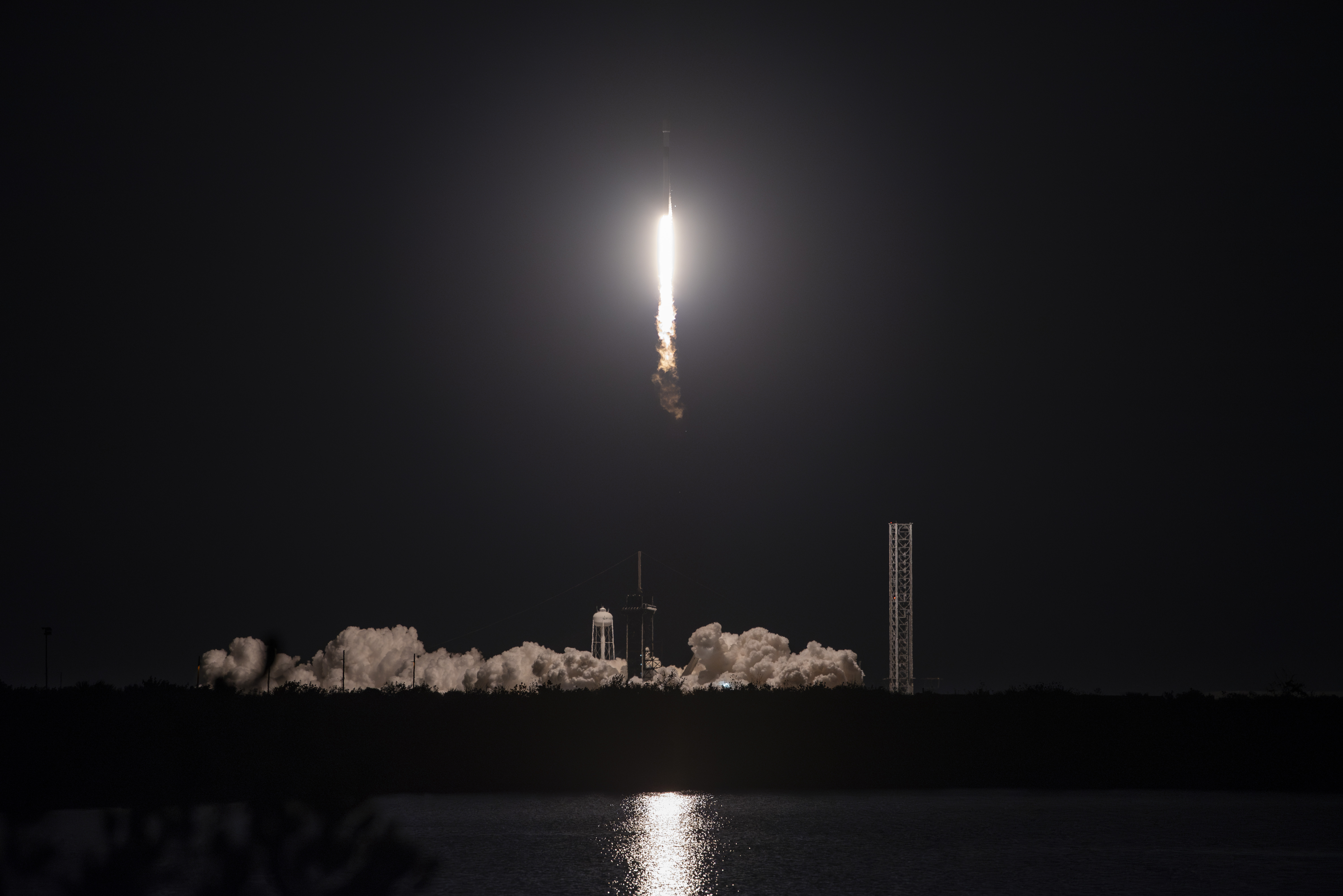
SpainSat NG-1 launch from Launch Complex 39A at Kennedy Space Center, Florida, on Jan. 29, 2025

Spainsat NG is a Spanish communications satellite program aimed at developing next-generation satellites to meet Spain's government and military secure communications needs.

== Background ==
The industrial management of the program is carried out by a consortium of four contractors: Airbus Defense and Space in Spain and France, and Thales Alenia Space in Spain and France. Other companies from the Spanish space sector that will also participate are Acorde, Anteral, Arquimea, Crisa, GMV, Iberespacio, HV Sistemas, Indra, Sener, Celestia TTI and Tecnobit. Public participation includes the Ministry of Defence, the Ministry of Industry, CDTI, INTA, and ESA. The satellites operator is Hisdesat.

== Satellites ==
The Spainsat NG program comprises two satellites, Spainsat NG I and Spainsat NG II, located in geostationary orbit and operating in X-band, military K_{a}-band, and UHF. These satellites are based on the Eurostar Neo platform, Airbus's geostationary telecommunications satellite product, derived from the Eurostar platform. The communication payloads of both satellites is provided by the Spanish industry, with Airbus in Spain being responsible for the X-band payload and Thales in Spain being responsible for the K_{a} and UHF band payloads. The satellites have protection against interference, as well as the ability to precisely geolocate the origin of the interference, and likely also have protection against high altitude nuclear explosions (HANE). The Spainsat NG satellites are designed for an operational useful life of 15 years, remaining in service until 2040. Both launches were performed by SpaceX Falcon 9 rockets.

== History ==
In October 2020, Spainsat NG program successfully passed the Preliminary Design Review (PDR) and in December 2021 it passed the Critical Design Review (CDR). The first satellite, Spainsat NG I, was successfully launched on 30 January 2025. The satellite, that occupies GEO 29° E position, was fully operational in August 2025, when the transfer of communications carriers from satellite XTAR-EUR was completed.

The second satellite, the Spainsat NG II, was successfully launched on 24 October 2025 to occupy the GEO 30° W position and to replace Spainsat. As of January 2026 Spainsat NG II was struck by what its operator described as a “space particle" while maneuvering to its final position in geostationary orbit. This happen at an orbit above GEO approximately at 50,000 km. On 16 January 2026, the satellite's operator Hisdesat concluded that Spainsat NG II has suffered non-recoverable damage and can no longer carry out its mission. The company has initiated a request for quotation for a replacement satellite, SpainSat NG III.

== See also ==
- Spainsat
