= XTAR =

Commercial satellite operator

XTAR, LLC
- Company type: Private
- Industry: Communications satellite operation
- Founded: 2001; 25 years ago
- Headquarters: Leesburg, Virginia, United States
- Owner: Loral Space & Communications (majority share); Hisdesat
- Website: xtar.com

XTAR, LLC is a US-based company founded in 2001 for the purposes of commercializing the capacity and services on HISDESAT’s governmental satellite systems, which are purpose-built to meet the needs of the Kingdom of Spain. XTAR provides military satellite communications (MILSATCOM) capacity and services in X-, mil-Ka, and UHF-frequency bands. It also provides all-weather, high-resolution .X-band synthetic aperture radar (SAR) imaging/earth observation services to the US Department of Defense, NATO Allies, and partner nations as well.

Roles:

- HISDESAT has a Public-Private Partnership with the Spanish Ministry of Defense, and thus acquires and operates the satellites, and provides the services required by them.
- Together, XTAR and Hisdesat provide the capacity unused by the Spanish Ministry of Defense to other NATO Allies and partner nations.

== Mission ==
Founded in 2001, U.S.-based XTAR was the world's first commercial satellite operator to provide services to government end-users on NATO Allied MILSATCOM assets, which today form the communications cornerstone of today's military, diplomatic, humanitarian and emergency disaster response operations. In 2024, HISDESAT expanded XTAR's role to also provide synthetic aperture radar (SAR) earth observation services to the US Department of Defense and other NATO Allies and partners. A privately owned and operated U.S. company, XTAR today supports the critical satellite communications and earth observation needs of governments around the world through both its MILSATCOM and SAR imaging services. Loral Space & Communications, Inc. owns the majority share. XTAR is headquartered in Leesburg, VA.

XTAR bandwidth is not application-specific; it can support and transmit to any one of the primary architectures used by government agencies today, including fixed-to-fixed, tactical-to-tactical, reach-back, broadcast and airborne platforms.

In 2019, XTAR and Spanish governmental satellite operator Hisdesat announced plans to construct two new military communications satellites. The new 'Next Generation' satellites have X, mil-Ka, and legacy UHF payloads and will be launching in 2025.

== Satellite fleet ==
=== Legacy satellites (2005-2026) ===
- 4 GB of circular polarity X-band capacity
- 72 MHz transponders
- Coverage from 105 degrees West Longitude east to 120 degrees East Longitude
- Global, fixed and steerable spot beams
- Right hand and Left hand circular polarity
- On-board switching enabled
- Compatible with existing X-band terminals
- Non-preemptible service
- Encrypted command and control links

The XTAR legacy fleet uses the hosted payload model, an application that is becoming increasingly used by U.S. and other governments. XTAR-EUR hosts a payload and XTAR-LANT is a hosted payload. Both satellites are built on the SSL 1300 modular platform from Space Systems/Loral and designed for 18-plus years of on-orbit operation. The spacecraft attitude maintained to within 0.02° in roll, pitch, and yaw.

With its high-powered 72 MHz transponders and global, fixed and steerable beams, XTAR provides 1.44 GB of secure X-band capacity with coverage from Denver east to Singapore. The system can accommodate massive wideband data requirements and provides overlapping coverage with regional redundancy for increased service and reliability.

The legacy XTAR satellites were designed and built by private financing.

Additional details:

==== XTAR-EUR ====
This satellite, at 29 degrees East longitude and originally owned by XTAR, began operations in February 2005. The XTAR-EUR satellite hosts a NATO-configurable payload designed to support an anchor European customer. The coverage area includes Eastern Brazil and the Atlantic Ocean, Europe, Africa, the Middle East, and Southeast Asia as far east as Singapore. Hisdesat and XTAR announced on July 31, 2020 that they completed a transaction whereby Hisdesat Strategic Services SA purchased the satellite from XTAR, mirroring Hisdesat's ownership of the XTAR-LANT/Spainsat satellite (immediately below), and thus simplifying the ownership arrangement of the two satellites.

==== XTAR-LANT ====
XTAR-LANT is a hosted payload on the Spainsat satellite. The satellite, at 30 degrees West longitude, is owned by Hisdesat and was placed into orbit in 2006. The coverage area includes North America, South America, Europe, Africa, and the Atlantic Ocean.

=== Next-generation satellites (2025-present) ===
==== XTAR-EUR-NG ("NG1") and XTAR-LANT-NG ("NG2") ====
On January 29, 2025, Hisdesat launched the "Next-Generation" replacement of XTAR-EUR. This on-orbit replacement, formally known as and filed with the ITU as "Spainsat-NG1," is commonly also referenced as "EUR-NG" or "NG1," and will arrive on-orbit in Aug/Sep 2025. Its twin, known as "Spainsat-NG2" (or "LANT-NG" or "NG2") is scheduled for launch in summer 2025 and will arrive on orbit to replace XTAR-LANT in Feb/Mar 2026. Together, these two fully software-defined satellites will be the most advanced satellites of their kind over Europe: Features:

- 6 GHz of X-band, 2 GHz of mil-Ka band, and 9 x 25-kHz wide channels of legacy (non-WCDMA) capacity per satellite
- Highly-efficient, DRA phased-array X-band antennas with on-board processing supports rapid geolocation, nulling, and RF muting, with shapeable beams ranging from 2.2-degrees to satellite FOV
- 6 steerable parabolic, and 1 non-steerable semi-global, mil-Ka antennas per satellite, with RF muting .
- Digital channelizers with cross-banding and flexible power allocation between X- and mil-Ka payloads; supports carriers 312.5 kHz to 500 MHz wide (X-band) and up to 1 GHz wide (mil-Ka), so suitable for today's most advanced waveforms
- Coverage from 105 degrees West Longitude east to 120 degrees East Longitude
- X-band in Right hand and Left hand circular polarity; mil-Ka is Right hand only
- NATO CP-130 MILSATCOM/SAL-3 Compliant
- NATO SATCOM Services - 6th Generation (NSS6G) Member
- Works with all NATO CP-130-compliant MILSATCOM terminals (i.e. WGS terminals)
- Non-preemptible service
- Encrypted command and control links to NATO standard

=== SAR imaging satellite ===
==== Earth Observation Satellite "PAZ" ====
Launched in 2018 from Vandenburg SFB, California, the Spanish MoD's "PAZ" (or "Peace") satellite provides high-resolution, all-weather X-band imaging services that are totally independent of weather. While ostensibly designed for Spanish MoD purposes, this advanced X-band imaging satellite can and does support a wide variety of civil and military applications today. Key features:

- Low-earth polar orbit
- Flexible imaging aperture, ranging from WideScan SAR images (270 x 200 km), perfect for Maritime Domain Awareness/Broad Area Maritime Search functions; to Staring Spotlight SAR images (4 x 4 km) with submeter (25 cm) resolution, with ground control point (GCP) generation capabilities suitable for targeting.
- On-board AIS receiver readily identifies dark vessels, useful for anti-smuggling/counternarcotics efforts, and other border security purposes.
- Radar interferometry, provides detailed Coherent Change Detection (CCD) capabilities, perfect for capturing subtle changes in topography and detailed pattern-of-life analyses.
- Common civil applications include digital elevation model (DEM) production, ice monitoring, cartography, and reference mapping for large infrastructure/construction projects (bridges, highways, etc)..

==== Earth Observation Satellite "PAZ-2" ====
A replacement satellite for Spanish MoD's earth observation needs is already in planning.

== Applications and User Groups ==
From training to special operations, XTAR space segment is the optimal choice for certain applications and user groups. The characteristics of X-band make it ideally suited for mobile applications where the smallest of terminals are used. In addition, X-band is naturally resistant to rain fade, allowing it to maintain excellent performance in rain, sandstorms, cloud cover, snow and high humidity. Airborne missions, small teams deployed with manpacks, and operations at sea, all demand exceptionally high levels of throughput and availability (>99.7%) in both transmit and receive mode. Other frequencies rarely achieve similar results with the same degree of efficiency.

With 100% terminal cross-compatibility, moving between to and from a NATO Allied MILSATCOM constellations - i.e. between WGS and XTAR - can be achieved in just a matter of minutes.

These are some of the applications and users that rely heavily on XTAR capacity for their mission-critical needs:

- Intelligence, Surveillance and Reconnaissance (ISR)
- Airborne, Maritime and Special Operations Command & Control (C2)
- Small Terminal with High Throughput Missions
- MILSATCOM Users with needs for alternate, flexible or resilient commercial bandwidth that can enable COMSATCOM to MILSATCOM roaming and interoperability.
- Border Security
- Disaster Response

== Contract Vehicles ==
- XTAR FCSA Transponded Services Contract
- Direct commercial contracting with XTAR
- FCSA Transponded Services reseller contracts
- FCSA Subscription Services and CS2 contracts through XTAR partners
- Other U.S. and non-U.S. contract vehicles

== Corporate Management ==
- Robert McDade – President & Chief Executive Officer, Chief Financial Officer
- Todd Dudley – Vice President, DoD and NATO Programs
- James Chambers – Vice President, Engineering
- Michelle Stewart - Chief of Staff

== Outside Directors ==
- S. Michelle Farr - Chairman, Government Security Committee (GSC)
- MG(R) Wayne Brock, GSC
- Peter Stauffer, GSC (Secretary)
- Avi Katz, GSC

== Ownership ==
XTAR is a privately owned company backed by majority shareholder Loral Space & Communications of New York (56%). XTAR also enjoys investment and support from minority shareholder Hisdesat Strategic Services SA (44%).

== Founding ==
XTAR, LLC was founded in 2001. It was the first commercial satellite operator to provide services in the X-band frequency range of 7.25-8.4 GHz, a band reserved exclusively for government and military users, though it launched the fleet with no government funding. It was the brainchild of a group of leaders at Space Systems/Loral and various Spanish entities such as INSA, Hispasat, and the Spanish Ministry of Defense.

== See also ==
- List of communication satellite companies
