= Courtsiding =

Gambling tactic

Courtsiding is the practice of transmitting information from sporting events for the purpose of gambling, or of placing bets directly from a sporting event. It has been observed as occurring most prominently, although not exclusively, in tennis. It arises as a result of the delay and latency between the actual venue and digital or satellite transmission of the event via television or IPTV broadcasting. The latter mode of delivery is specifically exploited, as most of the courtsided matches are low-to-unseeded tennis matches of no interest to a television network or viewers, and often receive only Internet distribution with a minimum (often unattended and automated) television camera setup.

== Legal issues ==
The procedure takes place when a spectator at a sporting event passes on, or uses, information which leads to bets being placed on 'in-game markets' before the bookmakers receive the information, and change the odds due to the in-play happening.

It has been claimed that courtsiding was illegal in Victoria, Australia, in 2013; with it comes a prison sentence of up to 10 years under the Integrity In Sports Act. It had been alleged to be an offence under the Gambling Act 2005. Chris Eaton opined that match fixers had turned to courtsiding due to it being "easier to accomplish". The UK Gambling Commission, however, have subsequently confirmed that courtsiding is not considered an offence in the UK.

Craig Tiley, CEO of Tennis Australia, later said that it could "arguably could be illegal, maybe some cases legal", and the chairman and CEO of the tour said that he felt it was not a major issue.

== Occurrences ==
At the 2013 Australian Open, there was a case of courtsiding, but the necessary legislation needed in order to commit an arrest was not in place.

The first arrest for courtsiding was at the 2014 Australian Open when a 22-year-old British man, Daniel Dobson, allegedly had an electronic device sewn into his shorts, in order to relay scores to a syndicate. Dobson's employers, Sporting Data, denied any involvement in illegal betting or any other illegal activity, issuing a statement that condemned Dobson's arrest as a "grossly unfair accusation". The case was withdrawn on the 6 March 2014.

The England and Wales Cricket Board released the fact that in summer 2013 there were 23 people ejected for what was believed to be courtsiding.

At the 2016 US Open, 20 spectators were caught courtsiding and were placed under bans that prohibited them from attending the tournament for 20 years; one of the individuals kicked out in 2016 was arrested for trespassing after being spotted at the tournament in 2017.

During the 2020 French Open, Spanish tennis player Gerard Joseph Platero Rodriguez was suspended for four years and fined $15,000 after being convicted of courtsiding, the first player to actually be charged with the offense.

== See also ==
- Front running, similar prohibited practice on stock markets
- Match fixing
