= MTN =

MTN may refer to:

- an abbreviation of mountain
- MTN Group, mobile telephone network operator in Africa and the Middle East
  - MTN-Qhubeka, cycling team sponsored by the telephone company
- Maritime Telecommunications Network, satellite phone network
- Mars Telecommunications Network, planned Mars orbiter mission by NASA
- Martin State Airport, Baltimore, US, IATA code
- Mauritania, IOC and ITU code
- Manitoba Television Network, former branding of CHMI-TV, now known as Citytv Winnipeg
- MTN (TV station), Griffith, New South Wales, Australia
- Medium term note, a debt note
- Michigan Talk Network, radio network
- Metriol trinitrate, a liquid explosive similar to nitroglycerin
- Montana Television Network, US
- Montenegro, UNDP-Code
- Mountain Air Cargo, ICAO airline designator
- MountainWest Sports Network, dedicated to the Mountain West Conference
- Multilateral trade negotiations, trade talks associated with the General Agreement on Tariffs and Trade and World Trade Organization
- Mountain Dew (stylized as Mtn Dew), carbonated soft drink
