= Maritime Vsat =

Telecommunications equipment

Maritime VSAT is the use of satellite communication through a Very-small-aperture terminal (VSAT) on a moving ship at sea. Since a ship at sea moves with the water, the antenna needs to be stabilized with reference to the horizon and True north, so that the antenna is constantly pointing at the satellite it uses to transmit and receive signals.

The Maritime VSAT (Business) Industry was first created for the US Navy in September 1986, by the joint venture team of Richard A. Hadsall, President and CEO of Crescomm Transmission Services and Robert J. Matthews, President of SeaTel Inc. The result of this business venture was the creation of the company Maritime Telecommunications Network, Inc. (MTN) MTN went on to commercialize the Maritime VSAT business by delivering services to Various Cruise Lines around the world as well as many Commercial Oil and Gas installations and vessels. MTN also pushed for global Maritime VSAT recognition with the petition for rule making from the FCC and the lobbying of the ITU's World Radio Commission (WRC) for recognition to use the fixed satellite service (FSS) in C and Ku band by creating new rulings to recognize Earth Stations on Vessels ESV. This was accomplished by revision of the Radio Regulations, complementing the Constitution and the Convention of the International Telecommunication Union ITU, which incorporated the decisions of the World Radio Communication Conferences of 2003 (WRC-03)

There are many different options to build a maritime broadband network onboard of a vessels. Each option has its advantage (and disadvantage) in cost, in the coverage, the signal strength and requirements for the antenna size (and thus the requirements of installation).

There are major differences in capabilities, features, cost and performance between VSAT (Geostationary orbit satellites in Ku-band, C-band and Ka-band) and Low Earth orbit or Medium Earth Orbit satellites with L-band technologies in use.

Both L-band (LEO & MEO) and VSAT (GEO) systems are marketed with what appear to be a shared set of features and benefits.
