= Dwell time =

Dwell time may refer to:

- Dwell time (filtration), the time a fluid remains in contact with an active filter medium.
- Dwell time (GNSS)
- Dwell time (information retrieval), the time a user remains at a search result after a click
- Dwell time (military), the time personnel spend in home station between deployments
- Dwell time (radar), the time that an antenna beam spends on a target
- Dwell time (shooting), the time from start of ignition until the bullet leaves the barrel
- Dwell time (transportation), the time a vehicle spends at a scheduled stop without moving
- Service time, in queueing theory
