= XTAR-EUR =

- Operator: Hisdesat
- COSPAR ID: 2005-005A
- SATCAT no.: 28542

Spacecraft properties
- Bus: SSL 1300

The XTAR-EUR is a communication satellite developed by Spain and the United States and in order to provide a secure channel over the Indian Ocean. It was originally operated by XTAR and Hisdesat. In year 2020 Hisdesat bought 100% stake on the satellite. Its launch short after the Spainsat is part of an effort to strengthen Spain's communication ties with allied countries around the globe, particularly in maters of national security (defense, disaster relief...).

== Body ==
The satellite is based on the Space Systems/Loral LS-1300 model. Consequently, it is shaped like a box (5.4 x 2.9 x 2.2 m) with a total weight of 1412 kg (3631 kg at launch). The sides of the box contain two retractable solar panels (providing up to 3.6 kW of power) while the lower base (facing anti-radial direction) holds the communication module. This module operates on the X band (compatible with SATCOM systems employed by NATO) and consists of 12 X-band transponders of 72 MHz broadband each (reserving 4 for usage by the Spanish Ministry of Defense while offering the other 8 for potential partners) and a 2.4 diameter antenna. The system allows both RHCP and LHCP polarization while covering an area of 6,3095 m^{2} RCS (2 global beams from Eastern Brazil and the Atlantic Ocean, across all of Africa and the Middle East to as far east as Singapore, 1 beam across the Mediterranean Sea and 4 steerable beams with the possibility of overlapping). Additional systems provide 3-axis inflight stability.

== Launch ==
The satellite was officially launched the 12th of February 2005 at 21:03 UT on board an Ariane-5 ECA rocket from the Guyana Space Center.

Its orbit is geostationary (GEO) 29º East, around 35,800 km high (35,782.6 km of perigee and 35,803.7 km of apogee) with 0º of inclination, a period of 1,436.1 minutes and a semi-major axis of 42,164 km.

During its operation life, the XTAR-EUR is being monitored from Arganda del Rey and Maspalomas Station. While the operating companies are based on Washington, D.C., Madrid and Palo Alto.

It is expected that the satellite will achieve an operational life exceeding 15 years until its planned decommission in 2023.

== See also ==
- XTAR
- Spainsat
