= Fibersat =

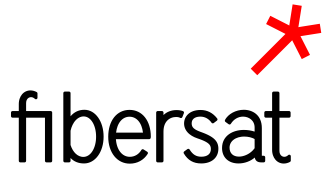
- Company type: Private
- Industry: Communications
- Founded: 2013
- Founder: Yen Choi Christof Kern
- Headquarters: Luxembourg
- Area served: Africa, Middle East
- Number of employees: 5-20
- Website: www.fibersat.com

Fibersat is a communications satellite operator in Africa, and the Middle East, headquartered in Luxembourg. Fibersat intends to launch its first satellite Fibersat-1 in 2018.

== History ==
Fibersat was established in 2013 by Yen Choi and Christof Kern. In 2015, Fibersat announced a hosted payload agreement with Arabsat on one of the upcoming launches. Fibersat has fully funded its first hosted payload and has signed multiyear contracts of up to 10 years in duration.

== Coverage ==
Fibersat-1 intends to provide coverage across Africa and the Middle East.

== Services ==
- Direct to Home Broadcasting
- Broadband
- Satellite Internet
- VOIP
- Unmanned Aerial Vehicle
- Aviation
- 4G/LTE

== Fleet ==
Upcoming

- Fibersat-1

Fibersat 1 is a Ka-band High Throughput Satellite (HTS) with multiple spot beams across Africa and the Middle East. The target launch date is Q3, 2018.
