= Speedcast =

Communications satellite company

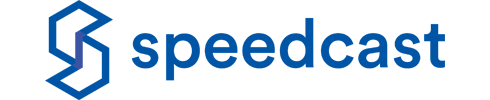
- Type: Private
- Industry: Satellite communication
- Founded: 1989
- Headquarters: Houston, Texas, United States
- Area served: Worldwide
- Key people: Jim Frownfelter (CEO)
- Owner: Centerbridge Partners
- Number of employees: 1,200
- Website: speedcast.com

Speedcast is a company specializing in communications satellite technology. Speedcast has a global maritime network. The company serves over 3,200 customers in approximately 140 countries.

Trading of Speedcast was suspended from the ASX on 3 February 2020. On 23 April 2020, Speedcast International filed for Chapter 11 bankruptcy in the United States. On 11 March, 2021, Speedcast announced the completion of its restructuring and emerged from Chapter 11 proceedings under the ownership of Centerbridge Partners, L.P.

== History ==
Speedcast was founded in September 1999 (it became Speedcast Ltd. in 2010). AsiaSat became a primary shareholder in Speedcast in March 2000. In November 2007, AsiaSat purchased all shares to become 100% owner of Speedcast. Speedcast has launched a variety of satellite telecommunications services to customers.

TA Associates, a global growth private equity firm, completed a buyout of Speedcast Ltd. from ("AsiaSat") in September 2012.

In 2012–2013, Speedcast completed the buyout of three satellite communications companies:

- Australian Satellite Communications ("ASC") based in South Australia in December 2012;
- Elektrikom Satellite Service ("Elektrikom") based in The Netherlands in January 2013; and
- Pactel International ("Pactel") was based in Australia in April 2013.

This group of companies formed the new Speedcast Group.

In June 2014, Speedcast announced the acquisition of Oceanic Broadband, an Australian integrator provider.

In August 2014, Speedcast was listed on the Australian Stock Exchange under the ticker SDA.

In 2015, Speedcast acquired six different companies:

- On 25 February 2015, Speedcast Ltd. announced the official acquisition of Geolink Satellite Services (GEO), a provider of satellite communications worldwide.
- On 16 March 2015, Speedcast acquired Hermes Data Communications International (HMS).
- In July 2015, the company acquired NewSat Ltd., a satellite communication provider in Australia, and SAIT Communications, a supplier of mobile-satellite services in the southern European maritime market.
- On 13 November 2015, ST Teleport, the satellite communications provider based in Singapore, was acquired by Speedcast.
- On 29 December 2015, Speedcast announced the official acquisition of Newcom International (NCI), a satellite communications service provider specializing in South and Central America.

The following year, in August 2016, Speedcast signed the acquisition of WINS Limited, a provider of innovative broadband satellite communications and IT solutions for the maritime sector in Europe.

On 1 January 2017, Harris Caprock, a former communications provider specializing in services to remote conditions, was acquired by Speedcast.

On 23 July 2017, the announcement was that Speedcast agreed to acquire UltiSat to create a new government division.

In December 2017, the British Government partnered with Speedcast to give the residents of Adamstown, Pitcairn Islands a 5 Mbit/s shared LTE Network.

Speedcast acquired Globecomm for US$135 million in late 2018, noting at the time that it was a good strategic opportunity. Globecomm subsequently suffered a decline in maritime business and delays to government projects in the pipeline.

In February 2020, Speedcast started looking for a new CEO after PJ Beylier resigned from the post. Beyler's resignation came as the company's board warned its shareholders that its financial results for the 2019 financial year may not be within the company's guidance. Board directors Peter Shaper and Joe Spytek acted as interim co-CEOs of the company.

On 23 April 2020, Speedcast filed for Chapter 11 bankruptcy.

On 11 March 2021, Speedcast announced the completion of its restructuring and emerged from Chapter 11 proceedings under the ownership of Centerbridge Partners, L.P.

== Key personnel ==
Thomas Choi founded Speedcast in 1998 as CEO, and later, Pierre-Jean Beylier was hired to lead the sales and marketing activities. He later became CEO in July 2004. He resigned from his post in February 2020 after disfavored company financial results were reported. Joe Spytek became CEO in January 2021. Jim Frownfelter is Speedcast's CEO as of January 2024.
