= Ciel Satellite Group =

Canadian satellite operator

- Company type: Private
- Headquarters: Ottawa, Ontario, Canada
- Area served: The Americas
- Services: Satellite operator
- Owner: Borealis Infrastructure, SES

Ciel Satellite Group is a private Canadian satellite operator, established in 2004, providing services throughout the Americas as a result of a partnership of Borealis Infrastructure, a financial institution, with satellite operator SES. The headquarters are located in Ottawa, Ontario. Ciel was founded to develop Canadian spectrum opportunities and meet the demand for domestic competitive satellite services. In 2006, Ciel requested Thales Alenia Space to manufacture the Ciel-2 satellite, which was launched on an ILS Proton Breeze M vehicle from the Baikonur Cosmodrome on December 10, 2008.

== See also ==
- List of communication satellite companies
