= Paz (satellite) =

Spanish Earth observation satellite

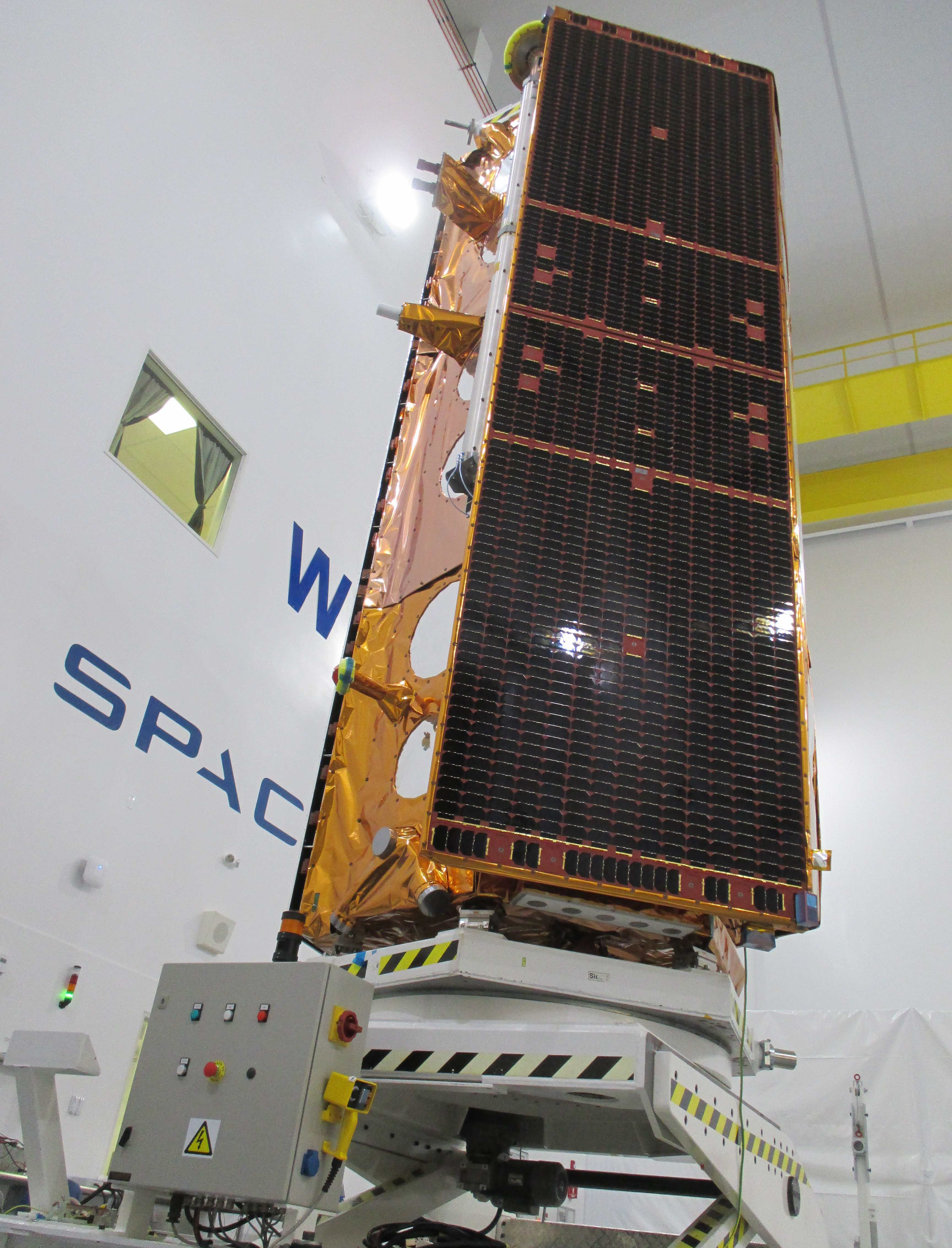
- Paz undergoing integration at SpaceX prior to launch
- Names: SEOSAR
- Mission type: Earth observation Reconnaissance; Intelligence
- Operator: Hisdesat
- COSPAR ID: 2018-020A
- SATCAT no.: 43215
- Mission duration: Planned: ≥7 years Elapsed: 8 years, 7 months, 22 days

Spacecraft properties
- Manufacturer: Airbus Defence and Space
- Launch mass: 1,341 kg (2,956 lb)
- Dry mass: 1,282 kg (2,826 lb)
- Dimensions: Hexagonal: 2.4 × 5 m (7.9 × 16.4 ft)
- Power: 850 W

Start of mission
- Launch date: 22 February 2018, 14:17 UTC
- Rocket: Falcon 9 Full Thrust B1038-2
- Launch site: Vandenberg, SLC-4E
- Contractor: SpaceX

Orbital parameters
- Reference system: Geocentric
- Regime: Low Earth
- Perigee altitude: 507.2 km (315.2 mi)
- Apogee altitude: 509.5 km (316.6 mi)
- Inclination: 97.45°
- Period: 94.79 minutes
- Epoch: 20 September 2018, 07:51:55 UTC

Transponders
- Band: X band
- Bandwidth: 300 Mbits/sec

Paz (Spanish, 'Peace') is a Spanish Earth observation and reconnaissance satellite launched on 22 February 2018. It is Spain's first spy satellite. The satellite is operated by Hisdesat. Paz was previously referred to as SEOSAR (Satélite Español de Observación SAR).

== Overview ==
For observational purposes, Paz uses a synthetic aperture radar (SAR) to collect images of Earth for governmental and commercial use, as well as other ship tracking and weather sensors, which enables high-resolution mapping of large geographical areas at day and night. The X-band radar imaging payload operates at a wavelength of 3.1 centimetres (1.2 in), or a frequency of 9.65 gigahertz.

The Paz satellite is operated in a constellation with the German SAR fleet TerraSAR-X and TanDEM-X on the same orbit. The collaboration was agreed on by both Hisdesat and former European aerospace manufacturer Astrium, operator of the two other satellites. The high-resolution images will be used for military operations, border control, intelligence, environmental monitoring, protection of natural resources, city, and infrastructure planning, and monitoring of natural catastrophes.

Originally, Paz was scheduled for launch from the Yasny launch base, Russia, in 2014, but this was delayed due to Russia's 2014 annexation of Crimea, resulting in an International Court of Arbitration legal battle between Hisdesat and Kosmotras. The US launch was estimated to cost around €53 million, cost partially reduced by the inclusion of several mobile internet satellites on the same flight.

== Launch ==
The satellite launched on a reused Falcon 9 rocket by SpaceX from Vandenberg Air Force Base, SLC-4E on 22 February 2018 at 14:17 UTC. The satellite hosted two secondary payloads: an AIS receiver and the Radio-Occultation and Heavy Precipitation (ROHP) experiment. The launch was shared by two 400 kg (880 lb) SpaceX test satellites for their Starlink, named Tintin A and B. It was the final flight of a Block 3 first stage, and reused the booster B1038 from the Formosat-5 mission. Paz weighs 1,282 kg (2,826 lb), and its total mass with fuel is 1,341 kg (2,956 lb). The payloads were carried to a Sun-synchronous dawn-dusk orbit. The launch was originally scheduled for 30 January 2018.

The booster flew without landing legs and was expended at sea. It also featured Fairing 2.0 with a recovery attempt using a crew boat named Mr. Steven that is equipped with a net. The fairing narrowly missed the boat, leading to a soft water landing.

== Applications ==
PAZ satellite images have been successfully used to monitor ground surface displacements, precipitation and cloud ice and crop classification.

== Gallery ==
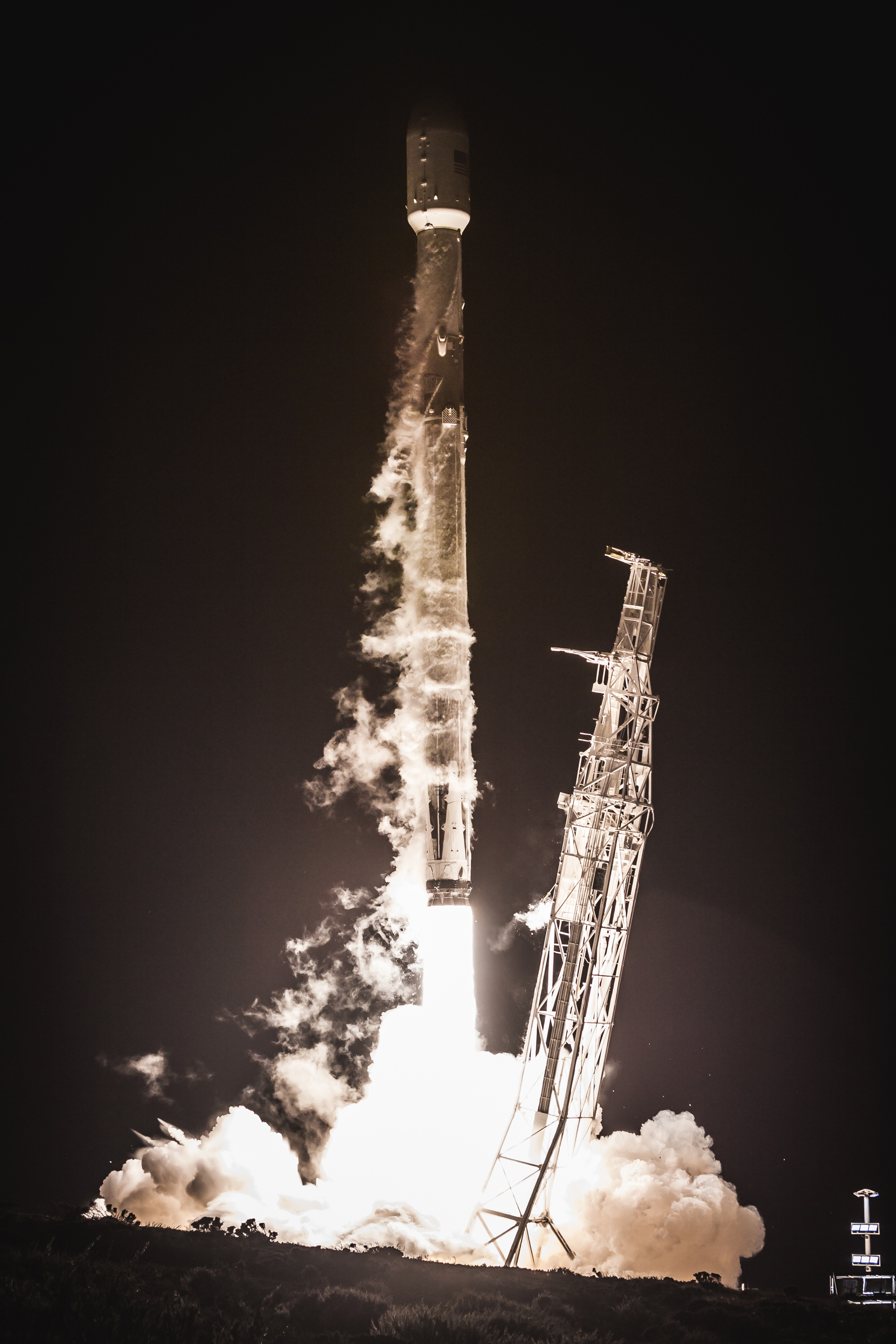

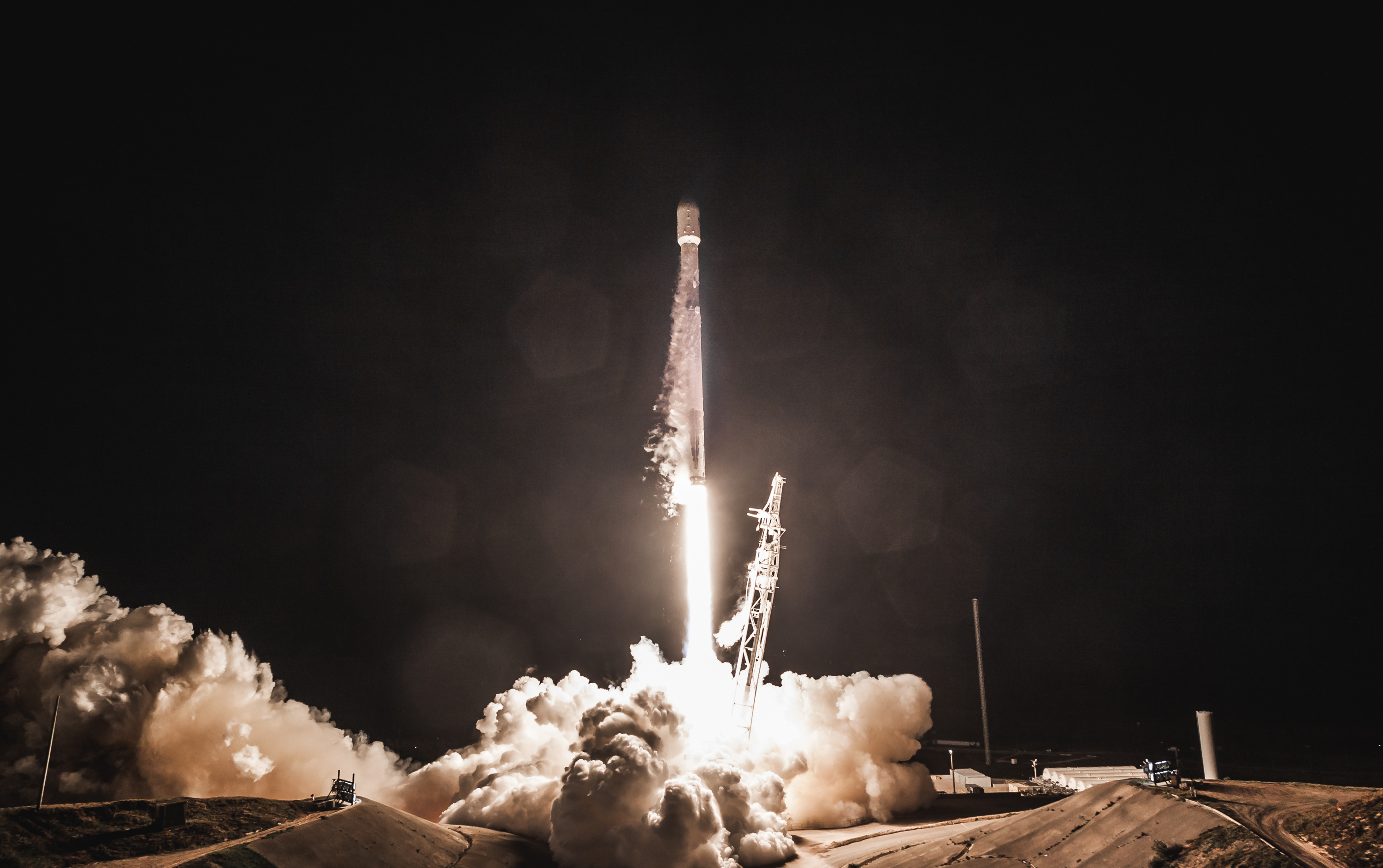

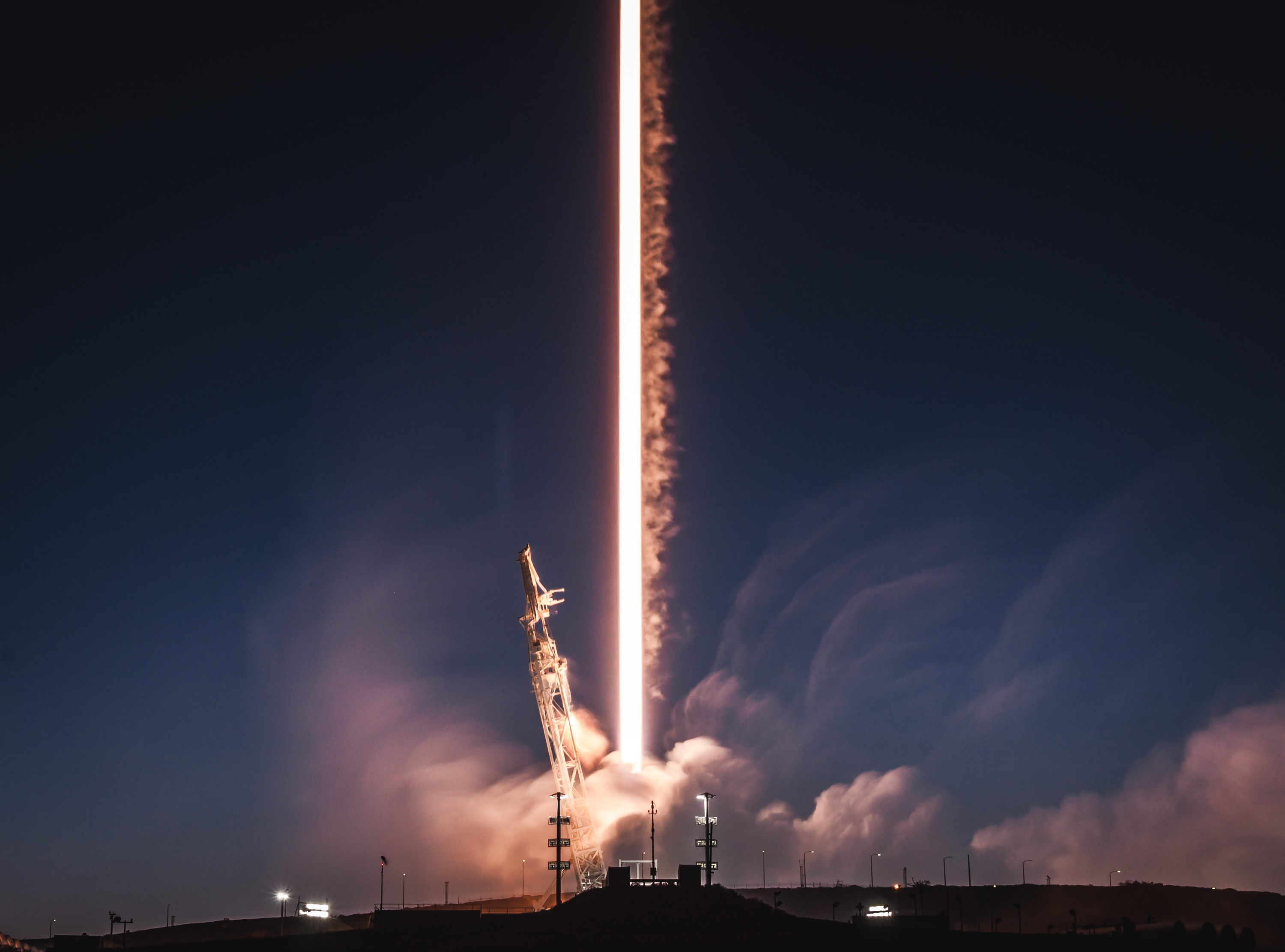

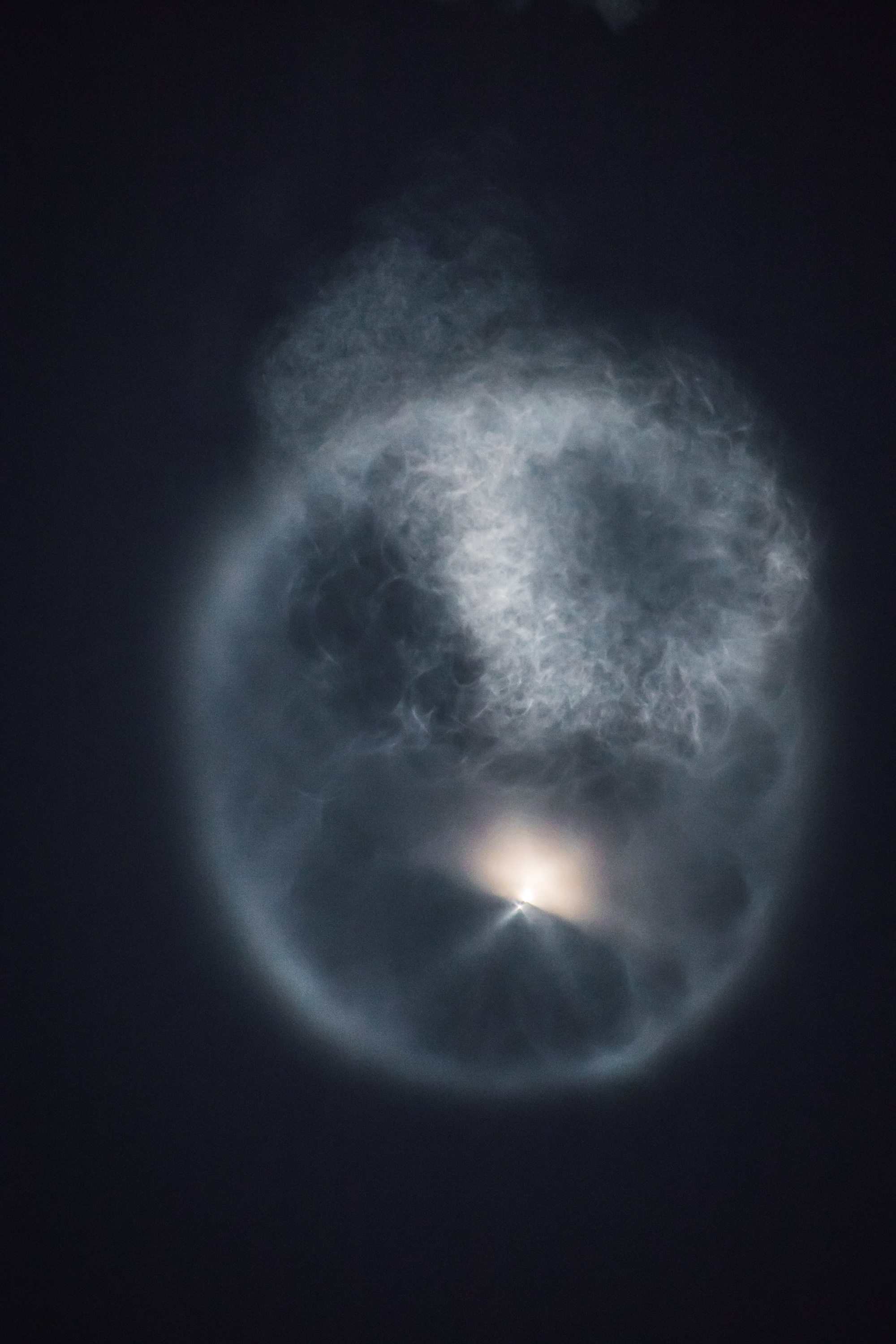
