= Ciel-2 =

- Mission type: Communications
- Operator: Ciel Satellite Group
- COSPAR ID: 2008-063A
- SATCAT no.: 33453
- Mission duration: 16 years (design life)

Spacecraft properties
- Bus: Spacebus 4000C4
- Manufacturer: Thales Alenia Space
- Launch mass: 5,561 kilograms (12,260 lb)

Start of mission
- Launch date: 10 December 2008, 13:43 UTC
- Rocket: Proton-M/Briz M
- Launch site: Baikonur 200/39
- Contractor: International Launch Services

Orbital parameters
- Reference system: Geocentric
- Regime: Geostationary
- Longitude: 129° west
- Perigee altitude: 35,782 kilometres (22,234 mi)
- Apogee altitude: 35,802 kilometres (22,246 mi)
- Inclination: 0.04 degrees
- Period: 1436.08 minutes
- Epoch: 25 January 2015, 05:14:56 UTC

Transponders
- Band: 32 K_{u} band
- Coverage area: North America

Ciel 2 (NORAD 33453) is a commercial broadcast communications satellite owned by Canadian Ciel Satellite Group. It was launched on December 10, 2008 from Baikonur Cosmodrome in Kazakhstan by an ILS Proton-M/Breeze-M vehicle. The satellite is built by Thales Alenia Space and is based on Spacebus-4000C4 bus. It is the largest Spacebus class satellite built to date (5561 kg). Operating from 129° West geostationary orbit position, its 32 K_{u} band transponders will deliver high-definition and other TV services throughout North America. The satellite delivers multiple independent spot beams in K_{u} band.

Dish Network has decided to spot beam local affiliates of major networks instead of offering them on CONUS as was previously done on Echostar 5.
