= Dweller =

Dweller may refer to:

- Dweller (film), a 2000 film by independent film icons the Polonia brothers
- Dwellers (film), a 2021 film directed by Drew Fortier
- Dweller (novel), a 2010 horror novel by Jeff Strand
- Dweller (Banks), a fictional species featured in Iain M. Banks' novel The Algebraist
- "Dweller", a song by Priestess from certain editions of the album Prior to the Fire

== See also ==
- Dwell (disambiguation)
