= Recondite =

Electronic music artist

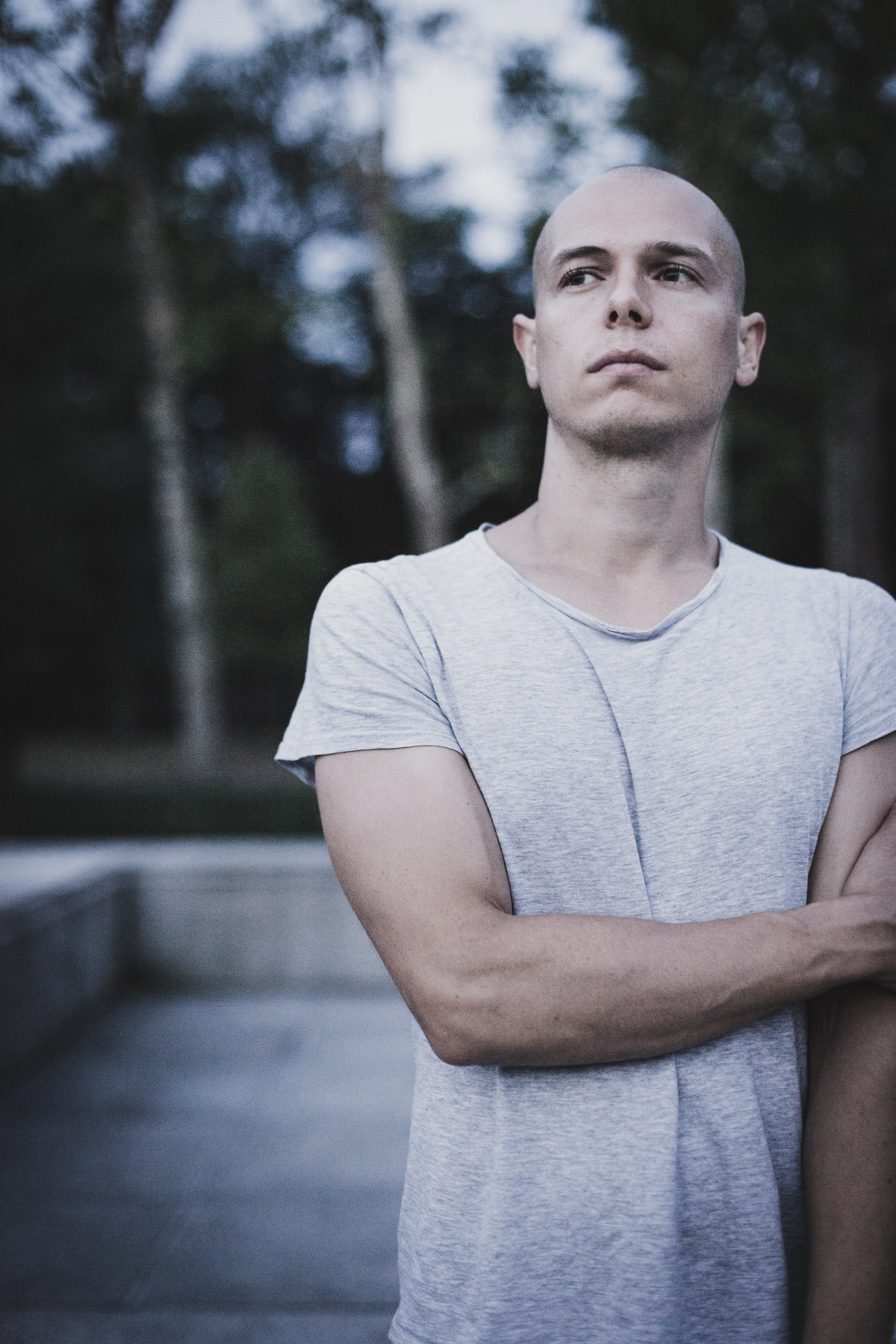
Recondite

Recondite (born Lorenz Brunner in Lower Bavaria) is a German musician, techno producer, label owner and sound artist.

== Biography ==
Brunner grew up in a rural area which is often named as a source of his inspiration. Besides the environment and the Lower Bavarian landscape, the population is also a direct influence to his work. This is true for the artist in general and for his alias Recondite in particular.

In this surrounding Brunner created his first tracks in a small home studio. Following this early musical creative period, the young producer moved to Berlin in 2009. Brunner founded Plangent Records in 2011 and published tracks under the name Recondite. Already the first four-track EP (PLAN 001) received very positive national and international feedback. In the same year Recondite got his first gig at Panorama Bar/Berghain in Berlin. Further releases on his own label, as well as on Scubas Label hotflush, followed expanded concert inquiries at home and abroad.

Increased attention was given to Recondite by the album On Acid, which was released in 2012 via the US label Absurd Recordings. Those tracks, influenced by the typical acid sounds, extended the musical diversity Brunners to another facet. The music press referred particularly to the fact that Brunner gave his own imprint to the previously known acid and created a "incredibly listenable" record. The appreciative echo that gave the music journals and the online portals, along with the ongoing success of his live shows, led Recondite to his first US gig at New York in 2012.

With his second long-player Hinterland, released in 2013 on the US label Ghostly International, Recondite became a worldwide-booked live act. Since then he has constantly been seen on stages in Europe, America, Asia, and Australia. Among other shows, he performed live between Sven Väth and Richie Hawtin on the Time Warp Festival 2014. In the very same year he became a Resident-DJ of Richie Hawtin's ENTER.Ibiza 2014. Recondite does major events such as Melt!, Amsterdam Dance Event and Time Warp just as club shows in smaller and mid-sized venues with correspondingly more intimate atmosphere.

Recondite released his third album Iffy in November 2014, his fourth album Placid in November 2015, and his fifth album Daemmerlicht in February 2018.

== Musical style ==
Recondite's diversity of appearances is reflected by releases on various labels such as Dystopian and Innervisions. These are driven by different variations of electronic music, but at the same time characterized by Brunner's own sound. Recondite performs live and is known for his sets adapted to the prevailing mood of the audience as well as to the divergent local conditions. This earned him a nomination for the DJ Awards 2014 in the category "Electronic Live Performance".

His musical style is attributed as ambient, deep house and techno/acid techno. In fact, Brunner's musical output blurs the boundaries between these categories. The released Albums and EPs include melancholy and gloomy tracks, with a typically low bpm, and also veritable techno tracks created for the dancefloor. According to this, the music press has difficulties in categorizing his style into a subgenre. The press has called Recondite's musical style e.g. "moll techno", "John Carpenter-House" (Groove), "meditative techno" (Resident Advisor), "Bayreuth in 4/4" and "Götterdämmerung in 808" (De:Bug).

Recondite uses field recording and synthesizers. He works with the native Operator synthesizer from Ableton, which combines analog sounds and frequency modulation synthesis. Except in the acid test productions, no further synthesizer are used by Brunner.

== Selected discography ==
=== Albums ===
- 2012: On Acid (Absurd Recordings, Acid Test (2))
- 2013: Hinterland (Ghostly International)
- 2014: Iffy (Innervisions)
- 2015: Placid (Acid Test)
- 2018: Daemmerlicht (Plangent Records)
- 2020: Dwell (Ghostly International)
- 2022: Taum (Plangent Records)
- 2023: The Dystopian Episodes (Plangent Records)
- 2024: Indifferent (Plangent Records)

=== EPs and singles ===
- 2011: Plangent #001 (Plangent Records)
- 2011: Plangent #002 (Plangent Records)
- 2011: Plangent #003 (Plangent Records)
- 2012: DRGN / Wist 365 (Hotflush Recordings)
- 2012: Plangent #004 (Plangent Records)
- 2013: EC10 (Dystopian)
- 2013: Stems (Ghostly International)
- 2013: Waldluft (Trolldans)
- 2013: Shift 003 (mit Julien H Mulder) (Midnight Shift Records)
- 2013: Plangent #005 (Plangent Records)
- 2014: Psy (Innervisions)
- 2014: Levo (Innervisions)
- 2014: Nadsat (Dystopian)
- 2014: Caldera (Hotflush Recordings)
- 2015: Limber/Undulate (Acid Test)
- 2016: Phalanx (Hotflush Recordings)
- 2016: Corvus (Ghostly International)
- 2017: Theater II (Dystopian)
- 2017: Update (Hotflush Recordings)
- 2018: Rainmaker (Afterlife Recordings)
