= Dwell time (military) =

Time service members spend in their home station between deployments to war zones

In the military, dwell time is the amount of time that service members spend in their home station between deployments to war zones. It is used to calculate the deploy-to-dwell ratio. Dwell time is designed to allow service members a mental and physical break from combat and to give them time with their families. It is an important component of long term military readiness.

== History ==
From the early days of the Global War on Terrorism until 2011, dwell time for American service members was reduced to a maximum of 12 months for most service members, increasing the deploy-to-dwell ratio to over 1:1 (15 months vs 12 months). "Dwell time at home stations became nothing more than getting ready for the next deployment." In October, 2011, the United States Department of Defense extended dwell time for U.S. soldiers to 24 months for every year deployed to a war zone, decreasing the deploy-to-dwell ratio to 1:2.

== Effects ==
A 2012 study of over 65,000 service members found that longer periods at home between deployments reduced the incidence of post traumatic stress disorder. Another study found that longer dwell times were associated with a reduced risk of suicide.
