= Dwell (album) =

Studio album by Recondite
- Released: 24 January 2020
- Genre: Minimal techno
- Length: 56:20
- Label: Ghostly International

Recondite chronology
Daemmerlicht (2018)	Dwell (2020)

Dwell is the sixth studio album by the German musician Recondite. It was released on 24 January 2020 through Ghostly International.

== Background ==
Dwell is Recondite's second album with Ghostly International, after his 2013 album Hinterland. Recondite felt that as he was creating Dwell, he was not innovating his musical style. He contemplated on shelving it, but decided to continue working on it as he "liked that music [he] was doing, and [he] was enjoying making it". Critics have described Dwell as being minimal techno with elements of downtempo and hip-hop. Recondite also incorporated field recordings on Dwell, including the sound of an electric toothbrush on "Mirror Games" and "Interlude 2". The track "Equal" was included as a bonus track on digital editions of the album.

== Reception ==
Professional ratings
Aggregate scores
Source	Rating
Metacritic	69/100
Review scores
Source	Rating
AllMusic	3.5/5 stars
Exclaim!	5/10
PopMatters	7/10

According to the review aggregator Metacritic, Dwell received "generally favorable reviews" based on a weighted average score of 69 out of 100 from four critic scores. Paul Simpson wrote in AllMusic: "[Recondite is] excellent at what he does, and the album is a cohesive collection of beat-driven mood pieces crafted with precision and attention to detail". Paul Carr stated in PopMatters: "Once again, Recondite has produced an enigmatic, ruminative minimal techno album that finds him successfully reconnecting and then further exploring the sounds that he used so strikingly on Hinterland". Ryan Keeling wrote in a Resident Advisor review that "if you like Recondite you'll probably like Dwell, and if you don't like Recondite (or you're a music writer) you probably won't". In a mixed review, Peter Boulos wrote in Exclaim! that "In the end, though, Dwell winds up being somewhat lukewarm".

== Track listing ==
All tracks written by Recondite.

Dwell track listing
No.	Title	Length
1.	"Dwell"	6:25
2.	"Nobilia"	3:41
3.	"Black Letter"	5:44
4.	"Interlude 1"	2:49
5.	"Mirror Games"	6:13
6.	"Cure"	5:06
7.	"Interlude 2"	2:57
8.	"Surface"	4:56
9.	"Moon Pearl"	6:32
10.	"Wire Threat"	6:07
11.	"Equal" (Bonus Track)	5:39
