= Dwell time (GNSS) =

Time required to test for the presence of a satellite signal

The dwell time in global navigation satellite systems (GNSS) is the time required to test for the presence of a satellite signal for a certain combination of parameters. A search process detects whether a GNSS satellite is present or not in an area of the sky, based on correlation of a received signal with a reference signal stored in the receiver.

The dwell times are associated with the performance of a certain detector. They can be classified into single dwell times, when the decision is taken in one step, and multiple dwell times, when the decision is taken in two or more steps.
