= Satellite delay =

Satellite delay is the noticeable latency due to the limited speed of light, when sending data to and from satellites, especially distant geosynchronous satellites. Bouncing a signal off a geosynchronous satellite takes about a quarter of a second, which is enough to be noticeable, but relaying data between two or three such satellites increases the delay.

== See also ==
- Geosynchronous satellite
