= Spainsat =

- Mission type: Telecommunications
- Operator: Hisdesat, XTAR
- COSPAR ID: 2006-007A
- SATCAT no.: 28945
- Mission duration: Planned 15 years

Spacecraft properties
- Bus: SSL 1300
- Manufacturer: Space Systems/Loral
- Launch mass: 3,683 kg (8,120 lb)
- Dry mass: 1,467 kg (3,234 lb)
- Power: 5773 W

Start of mission
- Launch date: 11 March 2006, 22:33 GMT
- Rocket: Ariane 5 ECA
- Launch site: Guiana Space Centre ELA-3

Orbital parameters
- Reference system: Geocentric
- Regime: Geosynchronous
- Longitude: 30°West

Transponders
- Band: 12 X band and 1 K band
- Coverage area: North America, South America, Middle East, Africa, Europe, Atlantic Ocean

Spainsat is a Spanish telecommunications satellite used for military and government communications. It allows telecommunications the different missions of the Spanish Armed forces abroad by providing coverage on a wide area of the world ranging from the United States and South America to the Middle East, including Africa and Europe.

== Overview ==
The satellite belongs to Hisdesat (Spanish company participated by Hispasat (43%), Ingeniería y Servicios Aeroespaciales (30%), Airbus (15%), Indra Espacio (7%) and Sener (5%)), and its initial investment was 415 million euros. It was built by Space Systems Loral in California United States, with an expected useful life of at least 15 years. Its takeoff mass was about 3,700 kilograms. It is instrumented with several transponders in the X band and one in the K military band. It is situated on a geostationary orbit at 36,000 kilometres of altitude, 30 degrees west, over the Atlantic Ocean.

The satellite provides coverage to humanitarian, security and intelligence missions as well as to military operations, image transfers, embassy services and Spanish governmental communications.

== Launch ==
The satellite was launched on 11 March 2006 at 22:33 GMT from the Guiana Space Centre in Kourou, French Guiana, by an Ariane 5 ECA rocket of Arianespace.
