= Maritime Telecommunications Network =

Satellite company

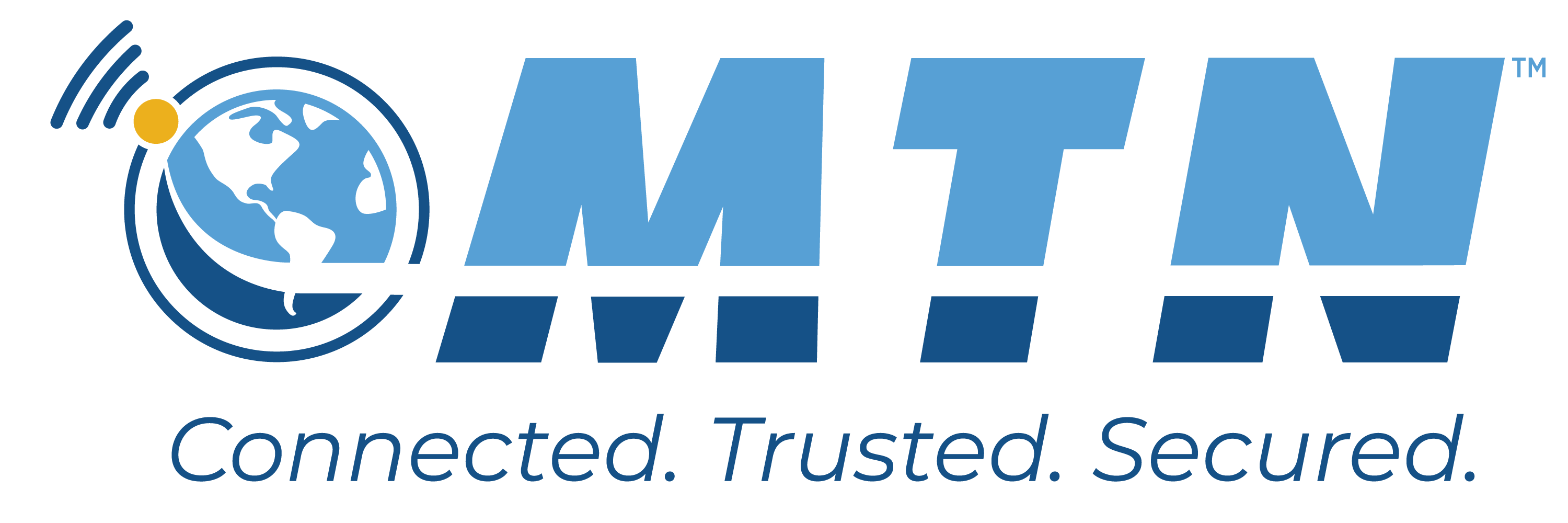
MTN Logo (2025)

MTN is a network operator and a global provider of converged satellite and wireless connectivity solutions. The company, which traces its history back over 45 years, delivers fully managed connectivity for critical systems and remote teams across the maritime, energy, government, and enterprise sectors.

MTN's core offering is its converged multi-network architecture, called StarEdge™ and StarEdge Horizon™. This system integrates Low Earth Orbit (LEO) satellite constellations (including Starlink and OneWeb), Geostationary (GEO) satellites, and 5G/4G/LTE terrestrial networks for automatic failover and connectivity, even in remote places.

Headquartered in Fort Lauderdale, Florida, MTN (a subsidiary of FMC GlobalSat) maintains a global presence with offices across Europe, the Middle East, and South America.

== Converged Connectivity and Hybrid Terrestrial-Satellite Networks ==
MTN operates a converged multi-network platform designed to provide secure and low-latency connectivity to remote and mobile operations worldwide. The company is an authorized reseller for LEO constellations, including Starlink and OneWeb.

The premium services offer 99.95% uptime and include pooled data plans, customized data allotments, an integrated customer portal, and in-house global installs. Their solutions are supported by an enterprise-grade global technical support organization that enables them to provide SD-WAN, direct VPN, MPLS, SCPC, and other specialized network tunnels while optimizing data traffic routes.

MTN offers tiered connectivity solutions built on its converged architecture:

- StarEdge™: This standard solution unifies multiple networks—including Starlink, OneWeb, VSAT, 5G/LTE, and near-shore Wi-Fi—to deliver uninterrupted service with automatic failover. All traffic is routed through encrypted VPN tunnels for added security and control.
- StarEdge Horizon™: A specialized solution designed for enterprise and government use that provides private Layer-2 connectivity over Starlink, bypassing the public internet. This service offers enhanced security, centralized control, and multi-network redundancy, allowing remote sites to connect directly into the corporate WAN.

== History and Acquisitions ==
Founded in 1981, MTN Satellite Communications (MTN), formerly known as Maritime Telecommunications Network, was a privately held VSAT satellite service provider. MTN provided connectivity services to major cruise lines, including Carnival Corporation, Royal Caribbean International, Norwegian Cruise Lines and well as luxury yachts, oil rigs, government and military vessels, and commercial vessels.

The company was acquired by Emerging Markets Communications (EMC) in July 2015. This acquisition, for a total cash consideration of $27.3 million plus liabilities, allowed the combined entity to create a mobility platform that integrated a hybrid satellite and terrestrial broadband network. Post-acquisition, the company continued to evolve, pioneering the delivery of converged connectivity solutions on a global scale, which led to the development of its current multi-network architecture incorporating LEO, GEO, and 5G technologies.

In 2024, FMC GlobalSat, a leading provider of satellite and wireless connectivity solutions worldwide, acquired MTN, which was at that moment Anuvu's Maritime, Enterprise, and Government connectivity businesses ("MEG").

== USS Scranton and Good Morning America ==
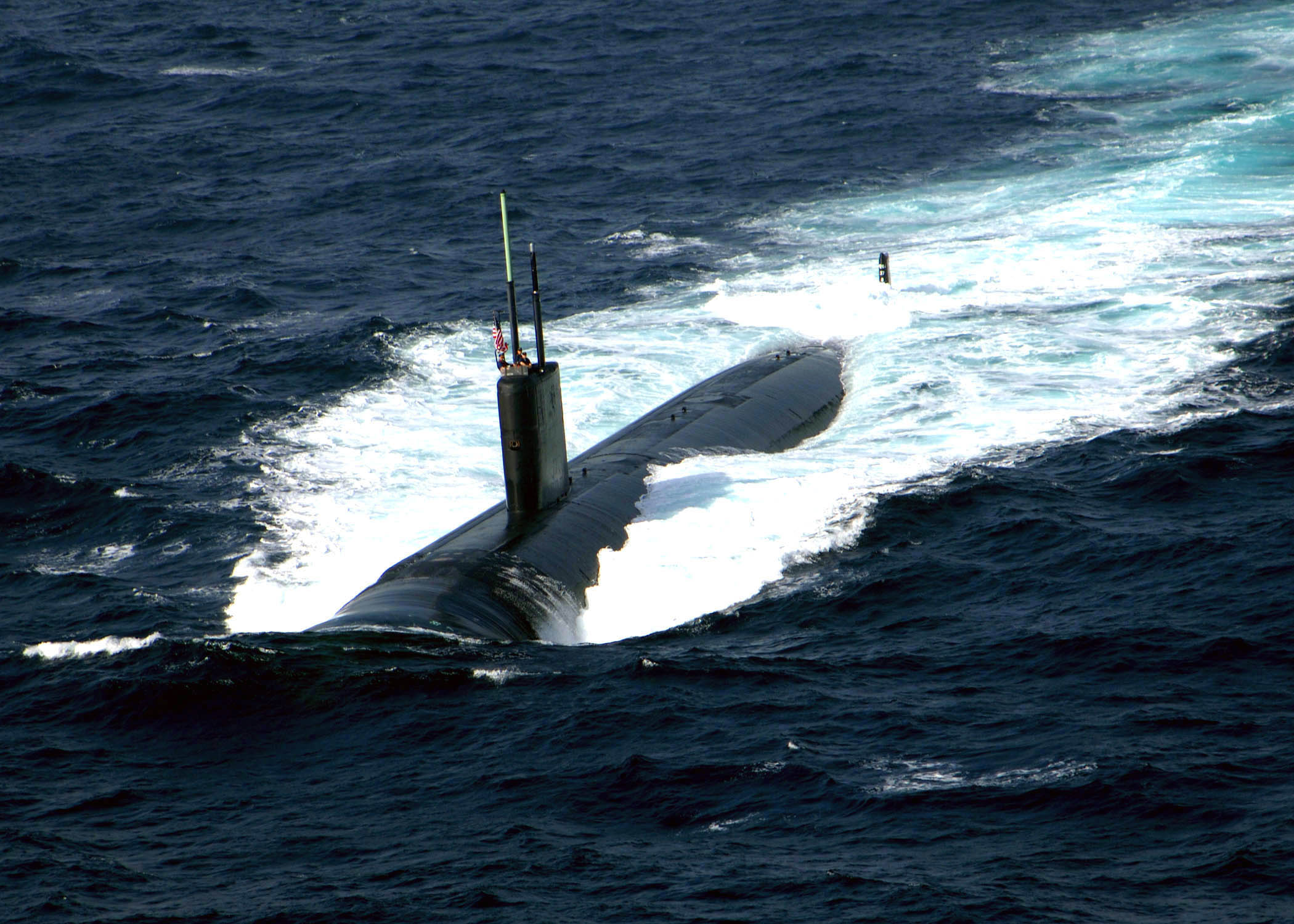
USS Scranton in the Persian Gulf, 2005

On November 23, 2005, ABC's Good Morning America ran a segment called "Run Silent, Run Deep" which was broadcast live from the nuclear submarine USS Scranton (SSN-756) while it was moving. The submarine and the US Navy support vessel USNS Dolores Chouest were each equipped with a 1900 MHz high-gain microwave antenna and equipment. The people on board the submarine had cellular service via a CDMA picocell on board the support vessel. The cell was provided by Wireless Maritime Services, a joint venture between MTN and Cingular Wireless. The submarine transmitted the live video broadcast quality to the Dolores Chouest using bidirectional microwave radios. The cellular technology was used to support all of the live two-way communications between the studio in New York City and the submarine below the surface. All of the video and cellular traffic was up-linked via MTN's communications technology on board the Dolores Chouest.

== MTN Government Services ==
In 2009, MTN formed MTN Government Services (MTNGS), a subsidiary company headquartered in Leesburg, Virginia that specializes in integrated communications services for military and government agencies. The MTN government team work with soldiers in Afghanistan, non-government organizations (NGOs) for disaster relief and recovery efforts in areas such as Haiti, scientific research ships mapping the ocean floor for NOAA, and a host of other government agencies for mission-critical communication needs.

== Emmy Award ==
In January 2012, MTN was awarded the 2011 Technology & Engineering Emmy Award from the National Academy of Television Arts and Sciences (NATAS) in the category "Development of Integrated, Deployable Systems for Live Reporting from Remote Environments" for collaborating with NBC on the Bloom-Mobile to Broadcast First Live "On the Move" Coverage of Military Forces in Iraq. The concept of the Bloom-Mobile was inspired by Mr. David Bloom himself in order to deliver live coverage of U.S. military forces in Iraq in 2003. MTN's founder and CTO Richard Hadsall, collaborated with Mr. Bloom and NBC over a 45-day period to design, build, commission and equip the vehicle with live television and satellite transmission equipment, allowing the Bloom-Mobile to send live, full-motion broadcast-quality video and audio as U.S. troops moved towards Baghdad. By securing a 200-watt stabilized 1.2-meter Ku-band antenna to the back of a custom-built Ford F450 4WD diesel truck, MTN enabled NBC to provide the first live "On the Move" broadcast coverage while traveling at speeds up to 70 mph. Since the Bloom-Mobile's launch, its presence in the broadcast industry continues to expand. The vehicle is used to cover a variety of stories including hurricanes and elections, and is leveraged by the U.S. government for both tactical and non-tactical applications.

== Holmdel teleport ==
The company solely owns and operates a teleport facility in Holmdel, New Jersey, USA. The facility is 10,000 sq. feet and supports transmission needs of government agencies, ISPs, television broadcasters, cable programmers, carriers, business television and radio. The Holmdel teleport has access to a variety of spacecraft, as well as the U.S. domestic arc serving the Pacific, Atlantic, and Western Indian Ocean regions. Holmdel is the only U.S. teleport connecting with IS at 359 degrees East Longitude.

== Santander teleport ==
The Santander teleport is a joint venture developed and completed by MTN and its technology partner, Erzia, a provider of VSAT maritime communications in Spain. The Santander teleport serves as a centralized gateway for MTN's VSAT communications with coverage over the Americas, Europe, and Asia. The facility is located in Santander, North Spain at 43°26’58.452’’N, 3°52’37.055’’W.

== MTN Nexus ==
In November 2012, MTN launched plans for a next-generation hybrid communications network, MTN Nexus. Connectivity and content demands on cruise operators in particular, increase significantly as cruise passenger and crew communications requirements grow. This new network is intended to deliver sophisticated computing, caching, and security infrastructure to deliver connectivity and communications to a degree never realized before at sea and in port. MTN Nexus is intended to bridge the gap between land-based and sea-based connectivity and content delivery to cater to today's always-connected passengers and crew.
