= Hisdesat =

Spanish satellite operator

- Company type: Sociedad Anónima
- Industry: Space, communications
- Founded: 2001
- Headquarters: Madrid, Spain
- Website: www.hisdesat.es

Hisdesat (Spanish: Hisdesat Servicios Estratégicos, S.A., 'Hisdesat Strategic Services') is a Spanish company created in 2001 by Hispasat (43%), Ingeniería y Servicios Aeroespaciales (30%), EADS CASA (15%, now Airbus), Indra Sistemas (7%) and SENER (5%) with initial investment of 415 million euros.

== Satellites ==
| Name | Launch date | Use | Constructor | Launch system | Orbital position | Transponders | Coverage |
|---|---|---|---|---|---|---|---|
| XTAR-EUR | 12 February 2005 | Military use | Space Systems/Loral | Ariane 5 | 29° East | 12 X band transponders | Europe, Middle East, southwest Asia, eastern Brazil, Horn of Africa |
| Spainsat | 11 March 2006 | Military use | Space Systems / Loral | Ariane 5 | 30° West | 13 X band transponders and 1 K_{u} band transponder | Europe, North Africa, America |
| Paz (HisdeSAT) | 22 February 2018 | Military use | Astrium Spain | Falcon 9 | SSO | X band radar | Worldwide |
| SEOSat-Ingenio | 17 November 2020 | Earth observation | Airbus Defence and Space | Vega | Destroyed during the launch (VV17) | - | Worldwide |
| Spainsat NG-I | 30 January 2025 | Military use | Airbus Defence and Space | Falcon 9 | | | |
| Spainsat NG-II | 24 October 2025 | Military use | Airbus Defence and Space | Falcon 9 | | | |

Other sources:

Satellites:

- Spainsat, secure communications, GEO
- XTAR-EUR, secure communications, GEO
- Paz, Earth observation, SSO, synthetic-aperture radar (SAR), X-band
- Spainsat NG I, secure communications, GEO
- Spainsat NG II, secure communications, GEO

== See also ==
- Hispasat, another Spanish satellite operator
