= Communications satellite =

Artificial satellite that relays radio signals

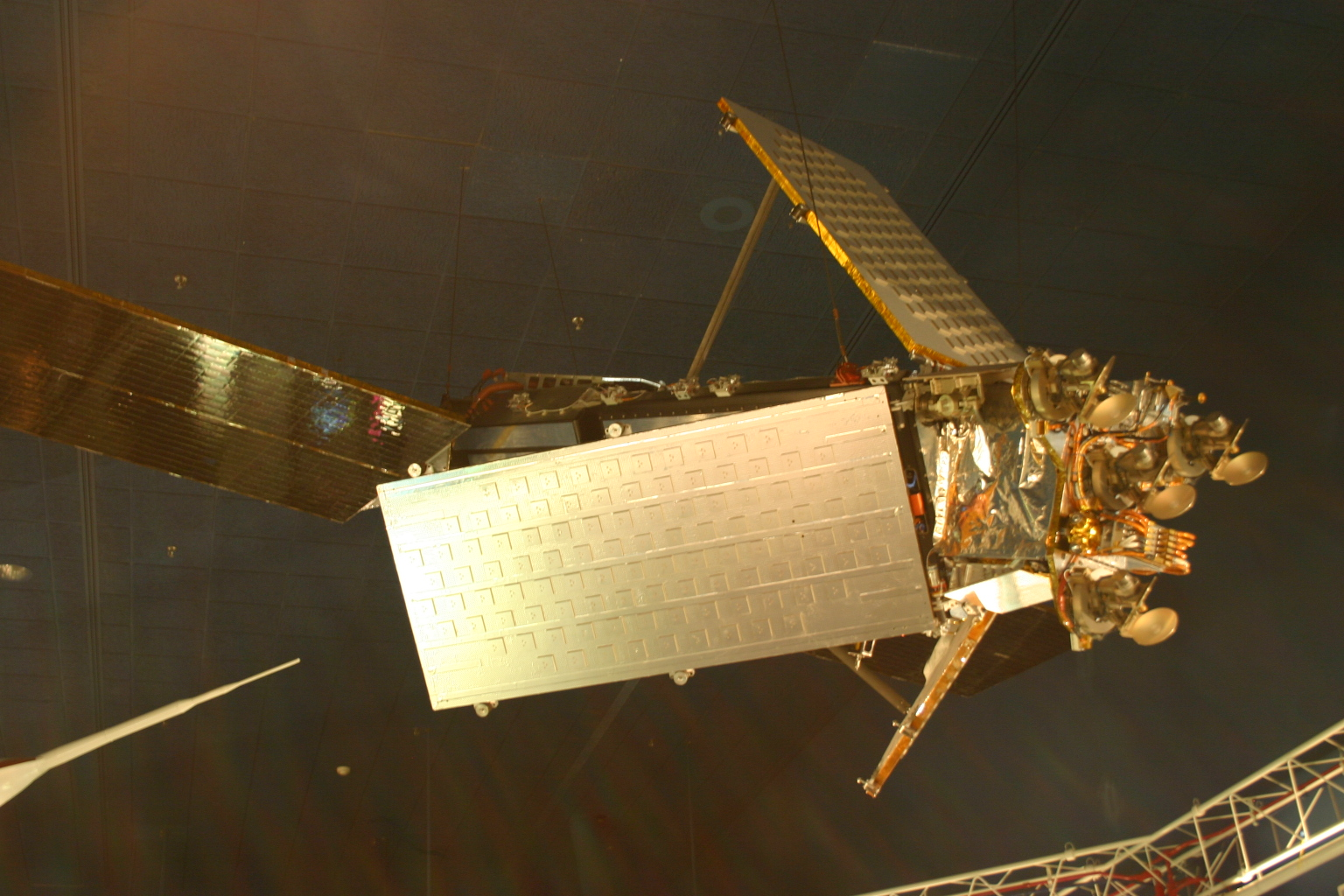
An Iridium satellite for satellite telephony

A communications satellite is an artificial satellite that relays and amplifies radio telecommunication signals via a transponder; it creates a communication channel between a source transmitter and a receiver at different locations on Earth. Communications satellites are used for television, telephone, radio, internet, and military applications. Some communications satellites are in geostationary orbit 22,236 miles (35,785 km) above the equator, so that the satellite appears stationary at the same point in the sky; therefore the satellite dish antennas of ground stations can be aimed permanently at that spot and do not have to move to track the satellite. However, most form satellite constellations in low Earth orbit, where ground antennas must track the satellites and switch between them frequently.

The radio waves used for telecommunications links travel by line of sight and so are obstructed by the curve of the Earth. The purpose of communications satellites is to relay the signal around the curve of the Earth allowing communication between widely separated geographical points. Communications satellites operate across a wide range of radio and microwave frequencies. To avoid signal interference, international organizations have regulations for which frequency ranges or "bands" certain organizations are allowed to use. This allocation of bands minimizes the risk of signal interference.

== History ==
=== Origins ===
In October 1945, Arthur C. Clarke published an article titled "Extraterrestrial Relays" in the British magazine Wireless World. The article described the fundamentals behind the deployment of artificial satellites in geostationary orbits to relay radio signals. Because of this, Arthur C. Clarke is often quoted as being the inventor of the concept of the communications satellite, and the term 'Clarke Belt' is employed as a description of the orbit.

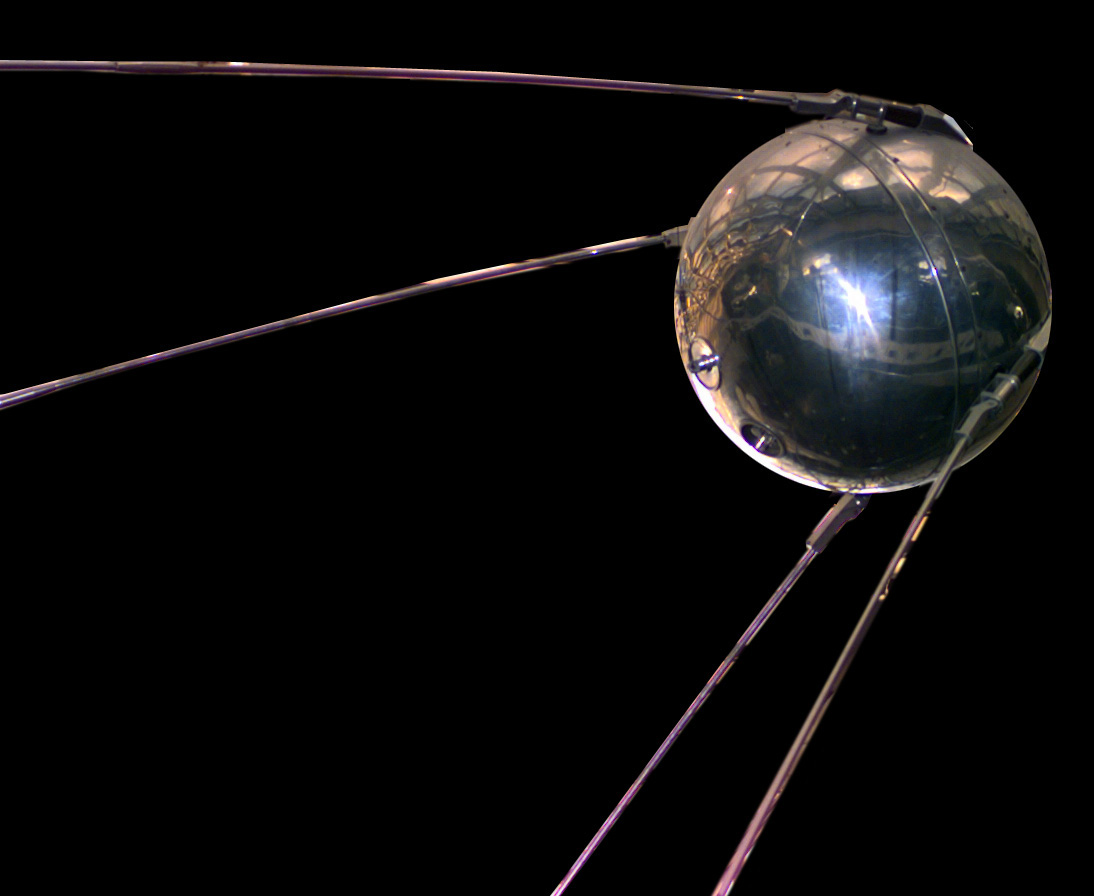
Replica of Sputnik 1

The first artificial Earth satellite was Sputnik 1, which was put into orbit by the Soviet Union on 4 October 1957. It was developed by Mikhail Tikhonravov and Sergey Korolev, building on work by Konstantin Tsiolkovsky. Sputnik 1 was equipped with an on-board radio transmitter that worked on two frequencies of 20.005 and 40.002 MHz, or 7 and 15 meters wavelength. The satellite was not placed in orbit to send data from one point on Earth to another, but the radio transmitter was meant to study the properties of radio wave distribution throughout the ionosphere. The launch of Sputnik 1 was a major step in the exploration of space and rocket development, and marks the beginning of the Space Age.

=== Early active and passive satellite experiments ===
There are two major classes of communications satellites, passive and active. Passive satellites only reflect the signal coming from the source, toward the direction of the receiver. With passive satellites, the reflected signal is not amplified at the satellite, and only a small amount of the transmitted energy actually reaches the receiver. Since the satellite is so far above Earth, the radio signal is attenuated due to free-space path loss, so the signal received on Earth is very weak. Active satellites, on the other hand, amplify the received signal before retransmitting it to the receiver on the ground. Passive satellites were the first communications satellites, but are little used now.

Work that was begun in the field of electrical intelligence gathering at the United States Naval Research Laboratory in 1951 led to a project named Communication Moon Relay. Military planners had long shown considerable interest in secure and reliable communications lines as a tactical necessity, and the ultimate goal of this project was the creation of the longest communications circuit in human history, with the Moon, Earth's natural satellite, acting as a passive relay. After achieving the first transoceanic communication between Washington, D.C., and Hawaii on 23 January 1956, this system was publicly inaugurated and put into formal production in January 1960.

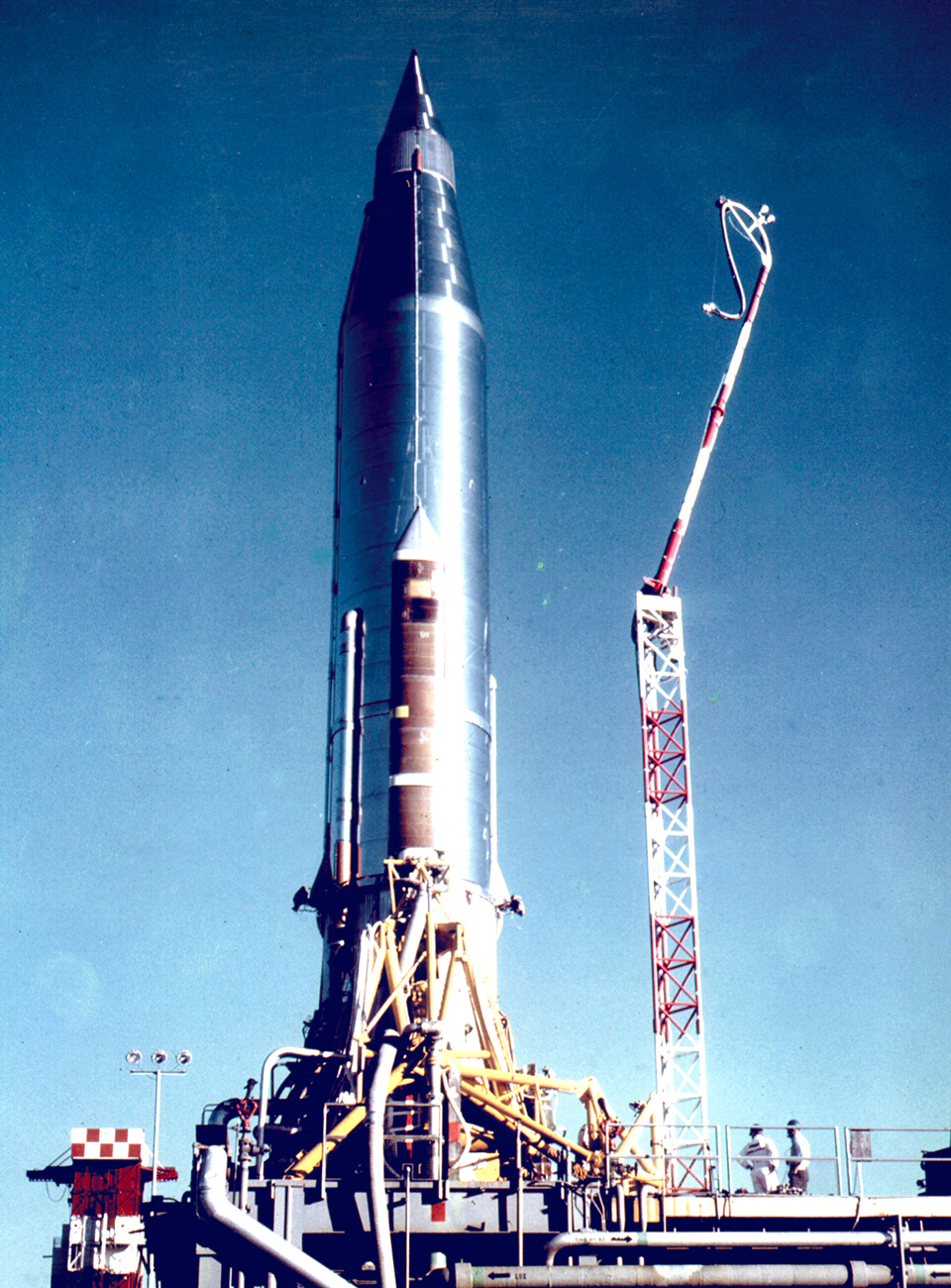
The Atlas-B with SCORE on the launch pad; the rocket (without booster engines) constituted the satellite.

The first satellite purpose-built to actively relay communications was Project SCORE, led by Advanced Research Projects Agency (ARPA) and launched on 18 December 1958, which used a tape recorder to carry a stored voice message, as well as to receive, store, and retransmit messages. It was used to send a Christmas greeting to the world from U.S. President Dwight D. Eisenhower. The satellite also executed several realtime transmissions before the non-rechargeable batteries failed on 30 December 1958 after eight hours of actual operation.

The direct successor to SCORE was another ARPA-led project called Courier. Courier 1B was launched on 4 October 1960 to explore whether it would be possible to establish a global military communications network by using "delayed repeater" satellites, which receive and store information until commanded to rebroadcast them. After 17 days, a command system failure ended communications from the satellite.

NASA's satellite applications program launched the first artificial satellite used for passive relay communications in Echo 1 on 12 August 1960. Echo 1 was an aluminized balloon satellite acting as a passive reflector of microwave signals. Communication signals were bounced off the satellite from one point on Earth to another. This experiment sought to establish the feasibility of worldwide broadcasts of telephone, radio, and television signals.

=== More firsts and further experiments ===
Telstar was the first active, direct relay communications commercial satellite and marked the first transatlantic transmission of television signals. Belonging to AT&T as part of a multi-national agreement between AT&T, Bell Telephone Laboratories, NASA, the British General Post Office, and the French National PTT (Post Office) to develop satellite communications, it was launched by NASA from Cape Canaveral on 10 July 1962, in the first privately sponsored space launch.

Another passive relay experiment primarily intended for military communications purposes was Project West Ford, which was led by Massachusetts Institute of Technology's Lincoln Laboratory. After an initial failure in 1961, a launch on 9 May 1963 dispersed 350 million copper needle dipoles to create a passive reflecting belt. Even though only about half of the dipoles properly separated from each other, the project was able to successfully experiment and communicate using frequencies in the SHF X band spectrum.

An immediate antecedent of the geostationary satellites was the Hughes Aircraft Company's Syncom 2, launched on 26 July 1963. Syncom 2 was the first communications satellite in a geosynchronous orbit. It revolved around the Earth once per day at constant speed, but because it still had north–south motion, special equipment was needed to track it. Its successor, Syncom 3, launched on 19 July 1964, was the first geostationary communications satellite. Syncom 3 obtained a geosynchronous orbit, without a north–south motion, making it appear from the ground as a stationary object in the sky.

A direct extension of the passive experiments of Project West Ford was the Lincoln Experimental Satellite program, also conducted by the Lincoln Laboratory on behalf of the United States Department of Defense. The LES-1 active communications satellite was launched on 11 February 1965 to explore the feasibility of active solid-state X band long-range military communications. A total of nine satellites were launched between 1965 and 1976 as part of this series.

=== International commercial satellite projects ===
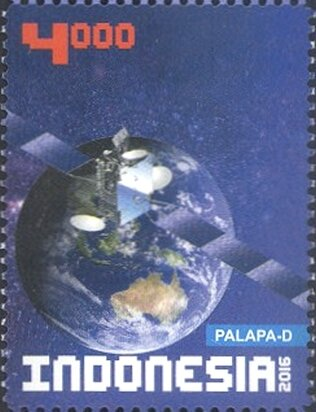
A stamp depicting the Palapa D satellite; the Palapa D satellite is a commercial satellite from Indonesia.

In the United States, 1962 saw the creation of the Communications Satellite Corporation (COMSAT) private corporation, which was subject to instruction by the US Government on matters of national policy. Over the next two years, international negotiations led to the Intelsat Agreements, which in turn led to the launch of Intelsat 1, also known as Early Bird, on 6 April 1965, and which was the first commercial communications satellite to be placed in geosynchronous orbit. Subsequent Intelsat launches in the 1960s provided multi-destination service and video, audio, and data service to ships at sea (Intelsat 2 in 1966–67), and the completion of a fully global network with Intelsat 3 in 1969–70. By the 1980s, with significant expansions in commercial satellite capacity, Intelsat was on its way to become part of the competitive private telecommunications industry, and had started to get competition from the likes of PanAmSat in the United States, which, ironically, was then bought by its archrival in 2005.

When Intelsat was launched, the United States was the only launch source outside of the Soviet Union, who did not participate in the Intelsat agreements. The Soviet Union launched its first communications satellite on 23 April 1965 as part of the Molniya program. This program was also unique at the time for its use of what then became known as the Molniya orbit, which describes a highly elliptical orbit, with two high apogees daily over the northern hemisphere. This orbit provides a long dwell time over Russian territory as well as over Canada at higher latitudes than geostationary orbits over the equator.

In the 2020s, the popularity of low Earth orbit satellite internet constellations providing relatively low-cost internet services led to reducing demand for new geostationary orbit communications satellites.

== Satellite orbits ==
Clickable image, highlighting medium altitude orbits around Earth, (Note: Orbital periods and speeds are calculated using the relations 4π^{2}R^{3} = T^{2}GM and V^{2}R = GM, where R is the radius of orbit in metres; T is the orbital period in seconds; V is the orbital speed in m/s; G is the gravitational constant, approximately 6.673×10^{−11} Nm^{2}/kg^{2}; M is the mass of Earth, approximately 5.98×10^{24} kg (1.318×10^{25} lb).) from Low Earth to the lowest High Earth orbit (geostationary orbit and its graveyard orbit, at one ninth of the Moon's orbital distance), (Note: Approximately 8.6 times when the Moon is nearest (that is, (363,104 km)/(42,164 km)), to 9.6 times when the Moon is farthest (that is, (405,696 km)/(42,164 km))) with the Van Allen radiation belts and the Earth to scale

Communications satellites usually have one of three primary types of orbit, while other orbital classifications are used to further specify orbital details. MEO and LEO are non-geostationary orbit (NGSO).

- Geostationary satellites have a geostationary orbit (GEO), which is 22,236 miles (35,785 km) from Earth's surface. This orbit has the characteristic that the satellite’s apparent position in the sky, as viewed from the ground, does not change, the satellite appears to "stand still" in the sky. This is because the satellite's orbital period is the same as the rotation rate of the Earth. The advantage of this orbit is that ground antennas do not have to track the satellite across the sky; they can be fixed to point at the location in the sky the satellite appears.
- Medium Earth orbit (MEO) satellites are closer to Earth. Orbital altitudes range from 2,000 to 36,000 kilometres (1,200 to 22,400 mi) above Earth.
- The region below medium orbits is referred to as low Earth orbit (LEO), and is about 160 to 2,000 kilometres (99 to 1,243 mi) above Earth.

As satellites in MEO and LEO orbit the Earth faster, they do not remain visible in the sky to a fixed point on Earth continually like a geostationary satellite, but appear to a ground observer to cross the sky and "set" when they go behind the Earth beyond the visible horizon. Therefore, to provide continuous communications capability with these lower orbits requires a larger number of satellites, so that one of these satellites will always be visible in the sky for transmission of communication signals. However, due to their closer distance to the Earth, LEO or MEO satellites can communicate to ground with reduced latency and at lower power than would be required from a geosynchronous orbit.

=== Low Earth orbit (LEO) ===
Low Earth orbit

A low Earth orbit (LEO) typically is a circular orbit about 160 to 2,000 kilometres (99 to 1,243 mi) above the Earth's surface and, correspondingly, a period (time to revolve around the Earth) of about 90 minutes.

Because of their low altitude, these satellites are only visible from within a radius of roughly 1,000 kilometres (620 mi) from the sub-satellite point. In addition, satellites in low Earth orbit change their position relative to the ground position quickly. So even for local applications, many satellites are needed if the mission requires uninterrupted connectivity.

Low-Earth-orbiting satellites are less expensive to launch into orbit than geostationary satellites and, due to proximity to the ground, do not require as high signal strength (signal strength falls off as the square of the distance from the source, so the effect is considerable). Thus there is a trade off between the number of satellites and their cost.

In addition, there are important differences in the onboard and ground equipment needed to support the two types of missions.

=== Satellite constellation ===
A group of satellites working in concert is known as a satellite constellation. Two such constellations, intended to provide satellite phone and low-speed data services, primarily to remote areas, are the Iridium and Globalstar systems. The Iridium system has 66 satellites, which orbital inclination of 86.4° and inter-satellite links provide service availability over the entire surface of Earth. Starlink is a satellite internet constellation operated by SpaceX, that aims for global satellite Internet access coverage.

It is also possible to offer discontinuous coverage using a low-Earth-orbit satellite capable of storing data received while passing over one part of Earth and transmitting it later while passing over another part. This will be the case with the CASCADE system of Canada's CASSIOPE communications satellite. Another system using this store and forward method is Orbcomm.

=== Medium Earth orbit (MEO) ===
A medium Earth orbit is a satellite in orbit somewhere between 2,000 and 35,786 kilometres (1,243 and 22,236 mi) above the Earth's surface. MEO satellites are similar to LEO satellites in functionality. MEO satellites are visible for much longer periods of time than LEO satellites, usually between 2 and 8 hours. MEO satellites have a larger coverage area than LEO satellites. A MEO satellite's longer duration of visibility and wider footprint means fewer satellites are needed in a MEO network than a LEO network. One disadvantage is that a MEO satellite's distance gives it a longer time delay and weaker signal than a LEO satellite, although these limitations are not as severe as those of a GEO satellite.

Like LEOs, these satellites do not maintain a stationary distance from the Earth. This is in contrast to the geostationary orbit, where satellites are always 35,786 kilometres (22,236 mi) from Earth.

Typically the orbit of a medium Earth orbit satellite is about 16,000 kilometres (10,000 mi) above Earth. In various patterns, these satellites make the trip around Earth in anywhere from 2 to 8 hours.

==== Examples of MEO ====
- In 1962, the communications satellite, Telstar, was launched. It was a medium Earth orbit satellite designed to help facilitate high-speed telephone signals. Although it was the first practical way to transmit signals over the horizon, its major drawback was soon realised. Because its orbital period of about 2.5 hours did not match the Earth's rotational period of 24 hours, continuous coverage was impossible. It was apparent that multiple MEOs needed to be used in order to provide continuous coverage.
- In 2013, the first four of a constellation of 20 MEO satellites was launched. The O3b satellites provide broadband internet services, in particular to remote locations and maritime and in-flight use, and orbit at an altitude of 8,063 kilometres (5,010 mi)).

=== Geostationary orbit (GEO) ===
Geostationary orbit

To an observer on Earth, a satellite in a geostationary orbit appears motionless, in a fixed position in the sky. This is because it revolves around the Earth at Earth's own angular velocity (one revolution per sidereal day, in an equatorial orbit).

A geostationary orbit is useful for communications because ground antennas can be aimed at the satellite without their having to track the satellite's motion. This is relatively inexpensive.

In applications that require many ground antennas, such as DirecTV distribution, the savings in ground equipment can more than outweigh the cost and complexity of placing a satellite into orbit.

==== Examples of GEO ====
- The first geostationary satellite was Syncom 3, launched on 19 August 1964, and used for communication across the Pacific starting with television coverage of the 1964 Summer Olympics. Shortly after Syncom 3, Intelsat I, aka Early Bird, was launched on 6 April 1965 and placed in orbit at 28° west longitude. It was the first geostationary satellite for telecommunications over the Atlantic Ocean.
- On 9 November 1972, Canada's first geostationary satellite serving the continent, Anik A1, was launched by Telesat Canada, with the United States following suit with the launch of Westar 1 by Western Union on 13 April 1974.
- On 30 May 1974, the first geostationary communications satellite in the world to be three-axis stabilized was launched: the experimental satellite ATS-6 built for NASA.
- After the launches of the Telstar through Westar 1 satellites, RCA Americom (later GE Americom, now SES) launched Satcom 1 in 1975. It was Satcom 1 that was instrumental in helping early cable TV channels such as WTBS (now TBS), HBO, CBN (now Freeform) and The Weather Channel become successful, because these channels distributed their programming to all of the local cable TV headends using the satellite. Additionally, it was the first satellite used by broadcast television networks in the United States, like ABC, NBC, and CBS, to distribute programming to their local affiliate stations. Satcom 1 was widely used because it had twice the communications capacity of the competing Westar 1 in America (24 transponders as opposed to the 12 of Westar 1), resulting in lower transponder-usage costs. Satellites in later decades tended to have even higher transponder numbers.

By 2000, Hughes Space and Communications (now Boeing Satellite Development Center) had built nearly 40 percent of the more than one hundred satellites in service worldwide. Other major satellite manufacturers include Space Systems/Loral, Orbital Sciences Corporation with the Star Bus series, Indian Space Research Organisation, Lockheed Martin (owns the former RCA Astro Electronics/GE Astro Space business), Northrop Grumman, Alcatel Space, now Thales Alenia Space, with the Spacebus series, and Astrium.

=== Molniya orbit ===
Geostationary satellites must operate above the equator and therefore appear lower on the horizon as the receiver gets farther from the equator. This will cause problems for extreme northerly latitudes, affecting connectivity and causing multipath interference (caused by signals reflecting off the ground and into the ground antenna).

Thus, for areas close to the North (and South) Pole, a geostationary satellite may appear below the horizon. Therefore, Molniya orbit satellites have been launched, mainly in Russia, to alleviate this problem.

Molniya orbits can be an appealing alternative in such cases. The Molniya orbit is highly inclined, guaranteeing good elevation over selected positions during the northern portion of the orbit. (Elevation is the extent of the satellite's position above the horizon. Thus, a satellite at the horizon has zero elevation and a satellite directly overhead has elevation of 90 degrees.)

The Molniya orbit is designed so that the satellite spends the great majority of its time over the far northern latitudes, during which its ground footprint moves only slightly. Its period is one half day, so that the satellite is available for operation over the targeted region for six to nine hours every second revolution. In this way a constellation of three Molniya satellites (plus in-orbit spares) can provide uninterrupted coverage.

The first satellite of the Molniya series was launched on 23 April 1965 and was used for experimental transmission of TV signals from a Moscow uplink station to downlink stations located in Siberia and the Russian Far East, in Norilsk, Khabarovsk, Magadan and Vladivostok. In November 1967 Soviet engineers created a unique system of national TV network of satellite television, called Orbita, that was based on Molniya satellites.

=== Polar orbit ===
In the United States, the National Polar-orbiting Operational Environmental Satellite System (NPOESS) was established in 1994 to consolidate the polar satellite operations of NASA (National Aeronautics and Space Administration) NOAA (National Oceanic and Atmospheric Administration). NPOESS manages a number of satellites for various purposes; for example, METSAT for meteorological satellite, EUMETSAT for the European branch of the program, and METOP for meteorological operations.

These orbits are Sun synchronous, meaning that they cross the equator at the same local time each day. For example, the satellites in the NPOESS (civilian) orbit will cross the equator, going from south to north, at times 1:30 P.M., 5:30 P.M., and 9:30 P.M.

=== Beyond geostationary orbit ===
There are plans and initiatives to bring dedicated communications satellite beyond geostationary orbits. NASA proposed LunaNet as a data network aiming to provide a "Lunar Internet" for cis-lunar spacecraft and Installations. The Moonlight Initiative is an equivalent ESA project that is stated to be compatible and providing navigational services for the lunar surface. Both programmes are satellite constellations of several satellites in various orbits around the Moon.

Other orbits are also planned to be used. Positions in the Earth-Moon-Libration points are also proposed for communication satellites covering the Moon alike communication satellites in geosynchronous orbit cover the Earth. Also, dedicated communication satellites in orbits around Mars supporting different missions on surface and other orbits are considered, such as the Mars Telecommunications Network.

== Structure ==
Communications satellites are usually composed of the following subsystems:

- Communication payload, normally composed of transponders, antennas, amplifiers and switching systems
- Engines used to bring the satellite to its desired orbit
- A station keeping tracking and stabilization subsystem used to keep the satellite in the right orbit, with its antennas pointed in the right direction, and its power system pointed towards the Sun
- Power subsystem, used to power the Satellite systems, normally composed of solar cells, and batteries that maintain power during solar eclipse
- Command and control subsystem, which maintains communications with ground control stations. The ground control Earth stations monitor the satellite performance and control its functionality during various phases of its life-cycle.

The bandwidth available from a satellite depends upon the number of transponders provided by the satellite. Each service (TV, Voice, Internet, radio) requires a different amount of bandwidth for transmission. This is typically known as link budgeting and a network simulator can be used to arrive at the exact value.

== Frequency allocation for satellite systems ==
Allocating frequencies to satellite services is a complicated process which requires international coordination and planning. This is carried out under the auspices of the International Telecommunication Union (ITU). To facilitate frequency planning, the world is divided into three regions:

- Region 1: Europe, Africa, the Middle East, what was formerly the Soviet Union, and Mongolia
- Region 2: North and South America and Greenland
- Region 3: Asia (excluding region 1 areas), Australia, and the southwest Pacific

Within these regions, frequency bands are allocated to various satellite services, although a given service may be allocated different frequency bands in different regions. Some of the services provided by satellites are:

- Fixed satellite service (FSS)
- Broadcasting satellite service (BSS)
- Mobile-satellite service
- Radionavigation-satellite service
- Meteorological-satellite service

== Applications ==
=== Telephony ===
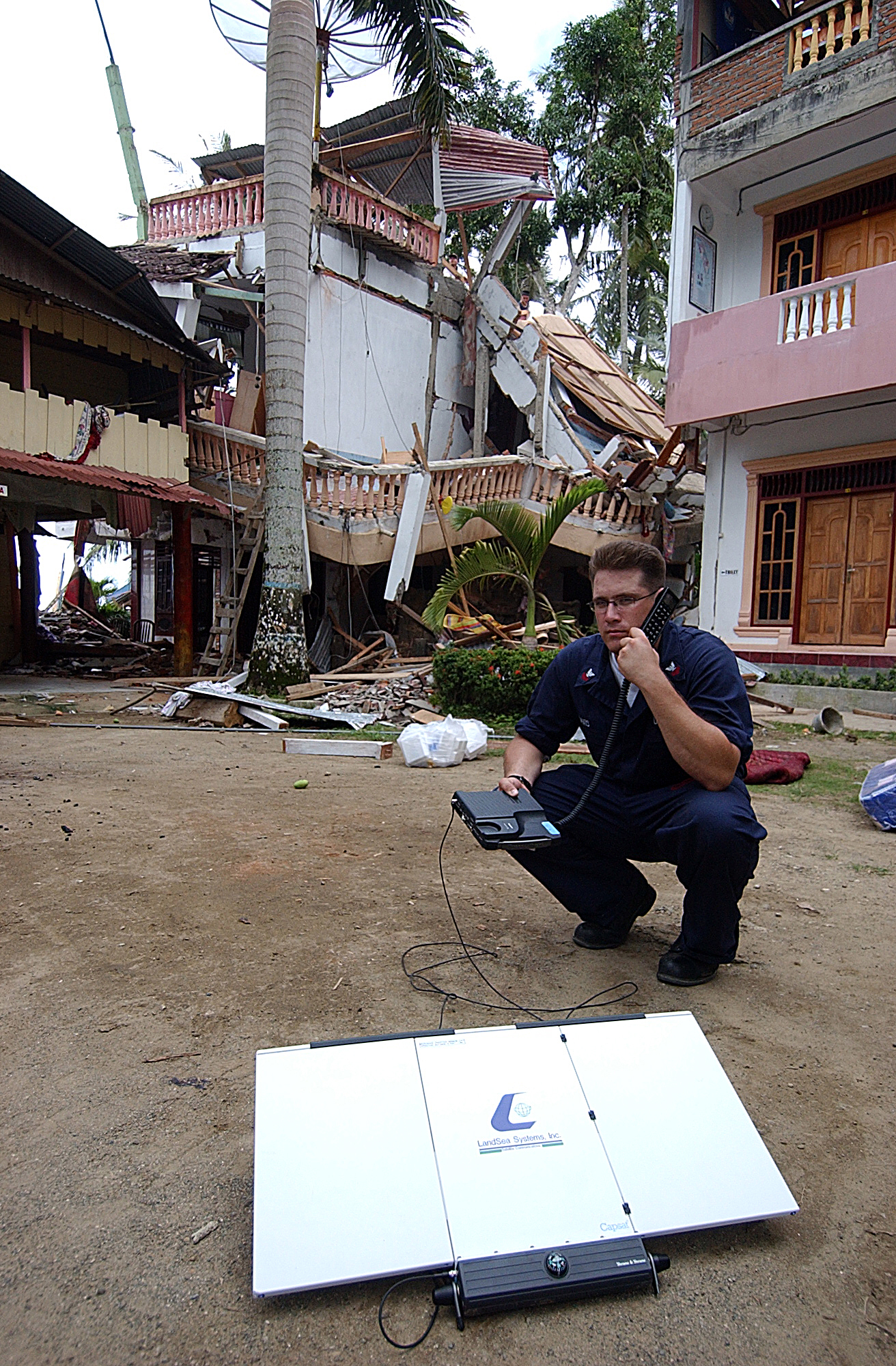
Satellite phone (Inmarsat) in use in Nias, Indonesia, in April 2005 after the Nias–Simeulue earthquake

The first and historically most important application for communication satellites was in intercontinental long distance telephony. The fixed Public Switched Telephone Network relays telephone calls from land line telephones to an Earth station, where they are then transmitted to a geostationary satellite. The downlink follows an analogous path. Improvements in submarine communications cables through the use of fiber-optics caused some decline in the use of satellites for fixed telephony in the late 20th century.

Satellite communications are still used in many applications today. Remote islands such as Ascension Island, Saint Helena, Diego Garcia, and Easter Island, where no submarine cables are in service, need satellite telephones. There are also regions of some continents and countries where landline telecommunications are rare to non existent, for example large regions of South America, Africa, Canada, China, Russia, and Australia. Satellite communications also provide connection to the edges of Antarctica and Greenland. Other land use for satellite phones are rigs at sea, a backup for hospitals, military, and recreation. Ships at sea, as well as planes, often use satellite phones.

Satellite phone systems can be accomplished by a number of means. On a large scale, often there will be a local telephone system in an isolated area with a link to the telephone system in a main land area. There are also services that will patch a radio signal to a telephone system. In this example, almost any type of satellite can be used. Satellite phones connect directly to a constellation of either geostationary or low-Earth-orbit satellites. Calls are then forwarded to a satellite teleport connected to the Public Switched Telephone Network .

=== Television ===
As television became the main market, its demand for simultaneous delivery of relatively few signals of large bandwidth to many receivers being a more precise match for the capabilities of geosynchronous comsats. Two satellite types are used for North American television and radio: Direct broadcast satellite (DBS), and Fixed Service Satellite (FSS).

The definitions of FSS and DBS satellites outside of North America, especially in Europe, are a bit more ambiguous. Most satellites used for direct-to-home television in Europe have the same high power output as DBS-class satellites in North America, but use the same linear polarization as FSS-class satellites. Examples of these are the Astra, Eutelsat, and Hotbird spacecraft in orbit over the European continent. Because of this, the terms FSS and DBS are more so used throughout the North American continent, and are uncommon in Europe.

Fixed Service Satellites use the C band, and the lower portions of the K_{u} band. They are normally used for broadcast feeds to and from television networks and local affiliate stations (such as program feeds for network and syndicated programming, live shots, and backhauls), as well as being used for distance learning by schools and universities, business television (BTV), Videoconferencing, and general commercial telecommunications. FSS satellites are also used to distribute national cable channels to cable television headends.

Free-to-air satellite TV channels are also usually distributed on FSS satellites in the K_{u} band. The Intelsat Americas 5, Galaxy 10R and AMC 3 satellites over North America provide a quite large amount of FTA channels on their K_{u} band transponders.

The American Dish Network DBS service has also recently used FSS technology as well for their programming packages requiring their SuperDish antenna, due to Dish Network needing more capacity to carry local television stations per the FCC's "must-carry" regulations, and for more bandwidth to carry HDTV channels.

A direct broadcast satellite is a communications satellite that transmits to small DBS satellite dishes (usually 18 to 24 inches or 45 to 60 cm in diameter). Direct broadcast satellites generally operate in the upper portion of the microwave K_{u} band. DBS technology is used for DTH-oriented (Direct-To-Home) satellite TV services, such as DirecTV, DISH Network and Orby TV in the United States, Bell Satellite TV and Shaw Direct in Canada, Freesat and Sky in the UK, Ireland, and New Zealand and DSTV in South Africa.

Operating at lower frequency and lower power than DBS, FSS satellites require a much larger dish for reception (3 to 8 feet (1 to 2.5 m) in diameter for K_{u} band, and 12 feet (3.6 m) or larger for C band). They use linear polarization for each of the transponders' RF input and output (as opposed to circular polarization used by DBS satellites), but this is a minor technical difference that users do not notice. FSS satellite technology was also originally used for DTH satellite TV from the late 1970s to the early 1990s in the United States in the form of TVRO (Television Receive Only) receivers and dishes. It was also used in its K_{u} band form for the now-defunct Primestar satellite TV service.

Some satellites have been launched that have transponders in the K_{a} band, such as DirecTV's SPACEWAY-1 satellite, and Anik F2. NASA and ISRO have also launched experimental satellites carrying K_{a} band beacons recently.

Some manufacturers have also introduced special antennas for mobile reception of DBS television. Using Global Positioning System (GPS) technology as a reference, these antennas automatically re-aim to the satellite no matter where or how the vehicle (on which the antenna is mounted) is situated. These mobile satellite antennas are popular with some recreational vehicle owners. Such mobile DBS antennas are also used by JetBlue Airways for DirecTV (supplied by LiveTV, a subsidiary of JetBlue), which passengers can view on-board on LCD screens mounted in the seats.

=== Radio broadcasting ===
Satellite radio offers audio broadcast services in some countries, notably the United States. Mobile services allow listeners to roam a continent, listening to the same audio programming anywhere.

A satellite radio or subscription radio (SR) is a digital radio signal that is broadcast by a communications satellite, which covers a much wider geographical range than terrestrial radio signals.

=== Amateur radio ===
Amateur radio operators have access to amateur satellites, which have been designed specifically to carry amateur radio traffic. Most such satellites operate as spaceborne repeaters, and are generally accessed by amateurs equipped with UHF or VHF radio equipment and highly directional antennas such as Yagis or dish antennas. Due to launch costs, most current amateur satellites are launched into fairly low Earth orbits, and are designed to deal with only a limited number of brief contacts at any given time. Some satellites also provide data-forwarding services using the X.25 or similar protocols.

=== Internet access ===
After the 1990s, satellite communication technology has been used as a means to connect to the Internet via broadband data connections. This can be very useful for users who are located in remote areas, and cannot access a broadband connection, or require high availability of services.

=== Military ===
Communications satellites are used for military communications applications, such as Global Command and Control Systems. Examples of military systems that use communication satellites are the MILSTAR, the DSCS, and the FLTSATCOM of the United States, NATO satellites, United Kingdom satellites (for instance Skynet), and satellites of the former Soviet Union. India has launched its first Military Communication satellite GSAT-7, its transponders operate in UHF, F, C and K_{u} band bands. Typically military satellites operate in the UHF, SHF (also known as X-band) or EHF (also known as K_{a} band) frequency bands.

=== Data collection ===
Near-ground in situ environmental monitoring equipment may use communication satellites for one-way data transmission or two-way operation (telemetry, telecontrol, and remote diagnostics).

It may be based on a secondary payload of a weather satellite (as in the case of GOES and METEOSAT and others in the Argos system) or in dedicated satellites (such as SCD). The data rate needed is typically much lower than in broadband satellite Internet access.

Applications include disciplines such as hydrology, oceanography, meteorology, seismology, etc. Instrumentation include tide gauges, weather stations, weather buoys, and radiosondes.

== See also ==
- Commercialization of space
- High-altitude platform station
- History of telecommunication
- Inter-satellite communications satellite
- List of communication satellite companies
- List of communications satellite firsts
- NewSpace
- Reconnaissance satellite
- Relay (disambiguation)
- Satcom On The Move
- Satellite data unit
- Satellite delay
- Satellite modem
- Satellite space segment
- Space pollution
- Traveling-wave tube
