= Douglas A-4 Skyhawk =

Carrier-based attack aircraft

A-4 (A4D) Skyhawk
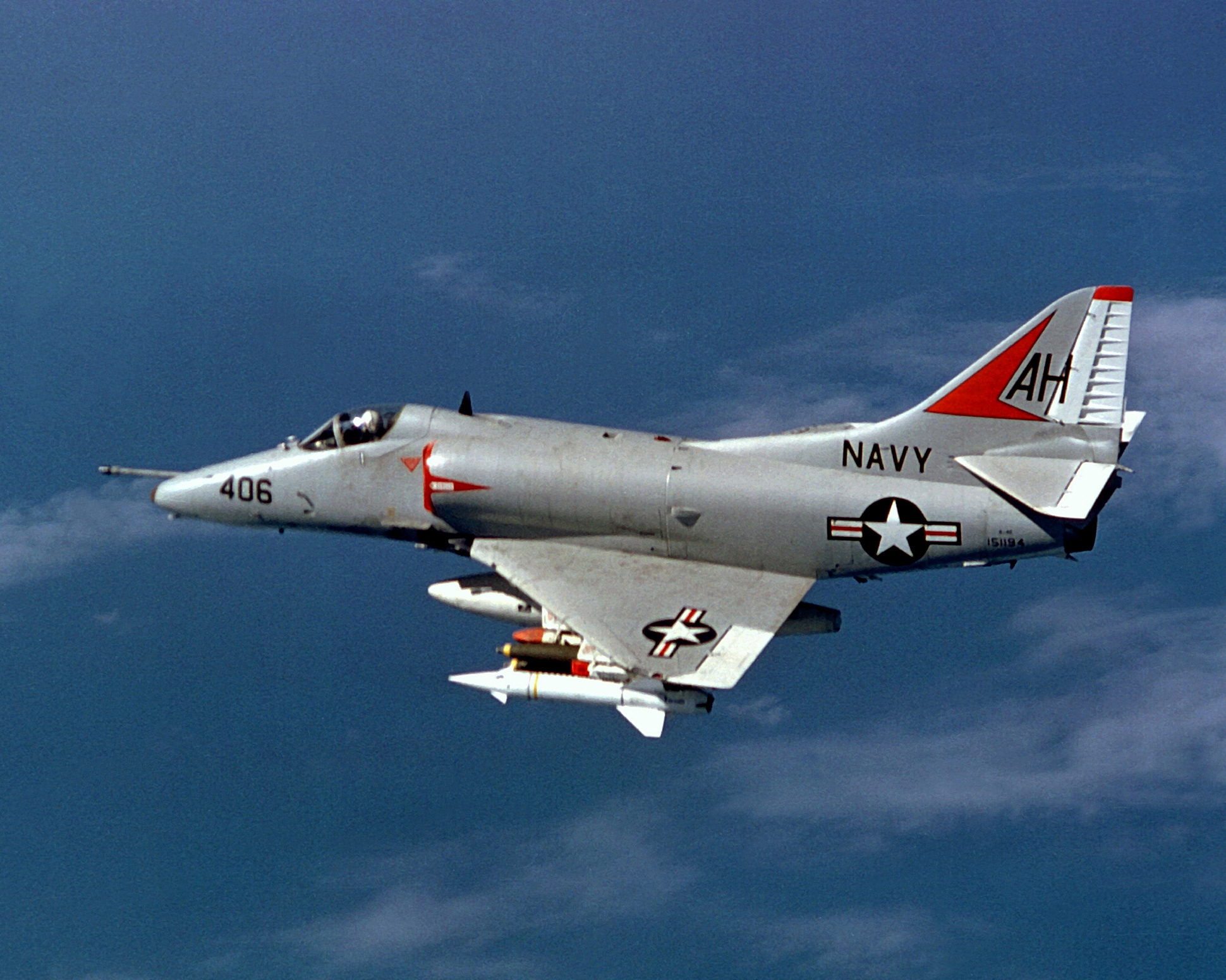
- A U.S. Navy A-4E Skyhawk of VA-164, from USS Oriskany, en route to attack a target in North Vietnam, 21 November 1967

General information
- Type: Attack aircraft, fighter, aggressor aircraft
- National origin: United States
- Manufacturer: Douglas Aircraft Company; McDonnell Douglas
- Status: In service with the Brazilian Navy
- Primary users: United States Navy (historical) United States Marine Corps (historical); Israeli Air Force (historical)
- Number built: 2,960

History
- Manufactured: 1954–1979
- Introduction date: 1 October 1956; 70 years ago
- First flight: 22 June 1954; 72 years ago
- Retired: USMC (1998), U.S. Navy (2003); Israeli Air Force (2015); Royal New Zealand Air Force (2001)
- Variants: Lockheed Martin A-4AR Fightinghawk; McDonnell Douglas A-4G Skyhawk; ST Aerospace A-4SU Super Skyhawk

The Douglas A-4 Skyhawk is a single-seat, subsonic, carrier-capable, light attack aircraft designed and produced by American aerospace manufacturer Douglas Aircraft Company, later built by McDonnell Douglas. It was originally designated A4D under the United States Navy's pre-1962 designation system.

The Skyhawk was developed during the early 1950s on behalf of the Navy and United States Marine Corps as a replacement for the propeller-driven Douglas A-1 (AD) Skyraider. The A-4 is a compact, straightforward, and lightweight aircraft for the era; its maximum takeoff weight of 24,500 pounds (11,100 kg) was roughly half of the Navy's weight specification. The Skyhawk has a short-span, delta wing configuration and tricycle undercarriage, and is powered by a single turbojet engine. The U.S. Navy issued a contract for the aircraft on 12 June 1952. On 22 June 1954, the XA4D-1 prototype performed its maiden flight; it went on to set a world speed record of 695.163 mph on 15 October 1955. On 1 October 1956, the Skyhawk was introduced to operational service.

The Skyhawk's five hardpoints can carry a variety of missiles, bombs, and other munitions. It can carry a bomb load equivalent to that of the World War II-era Boeing B-17 bomber, and can deliver nuclear weapons using a low-altitude bombing system and a "loft" delivery technique. It pioneered the concept of "buddy" air-to-air refueling, which reduces the need for dedicated aerial tankers. The Skyhawk was originally powered by the Wright J65 turbojet engine; from the A-4E onwards, the Pratt & Whitney J52 engine was used, instead. By the time production ended in February 1979, a total of 2,960 had been built for a variety of operators, including 555 as two-seat trainers.

The Skyhawk saw combat in several conflicts. The Navy operated the type as its principal light-attack aircraft during the Vietnam War, carrying out some of the first U.S. air strikes of the conflict. The Skyhawk was the Israeli Air Force's main ground-attack aircraft during the War of Attrition and the Yom Kippur War. In the Falklands War, Argentinean Skyhawks bombed Royal Navy vessels, sinking the Type 42 destroyer Coventry and the Type 21 frigate Ardent. Indonesian Air Force Skyhawks were used for counterinsurgency strikes in East Timor. Kuwaiti Air Force Skyhawks saw action during Operation Desert Storm. In 2022, nearly seven decades after the aircraft's first flight in 1954, a number of Skyhawks remained in service with the Argentine Air Force and the Brazilian Naval Aviation. By 2026, only Brazil operated the A-4.

== Design and development ==
The Skyhawk was designed by Douglas Aircraft's Ed Heinemann in response to a U.S. Navy (USN) call for a jet-powered attack aircraft to replace the piston engined Douglas AD Skyraider (later redesignated A-1 Skyraider). Heinemann opted for a design that would minimize its size, weight, and complexity. The result was an aircraft that weighed only half of the Navy's weight specification. It had a wing so compact that it did not need to be folded for carrier stowage. The first 500 production examples cost an average of $860,000 (equivalent to about $10,310,000 in 2025) each, less than the Navy's $1 million maximum. The diminutive Skyhawk soon received the nicknames "Scooter", "Kiddiecar", "Bantam Bomber", "Tinker Toy Bomber", and, on account of its speed and nimble performance, "Heinemann's Hot-Rod". The XA4D-1 prototype set a world speed record of 695.163 mph on 15 October 1955.

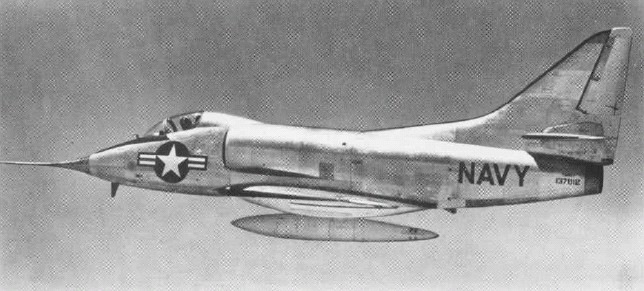
The XA4D-1 prototype in 1954

The aircraft is of conventional post-World War II design, with a low-mounted delta wing, tricycle undercarriage, and a single turbojet engine in the rear fuselage, with two air intakes on the fuselage sides. The tail is of cruciform design, with the horizontal stabilizer mounted above the fuselage. Armament consisted of two 20 mm (.79 in caliber) Colt Mark 12 cannons, one in each wing root, with 100 rounds per gun (the A-4M Skyhawk II and types based on the A-4M have 200 rounds per gun), plus a large variety of bombs, rockets, and missiles carried on a hardpoint under the fuselage centerline and hardpoints under each wing (originally one per wing, later two).

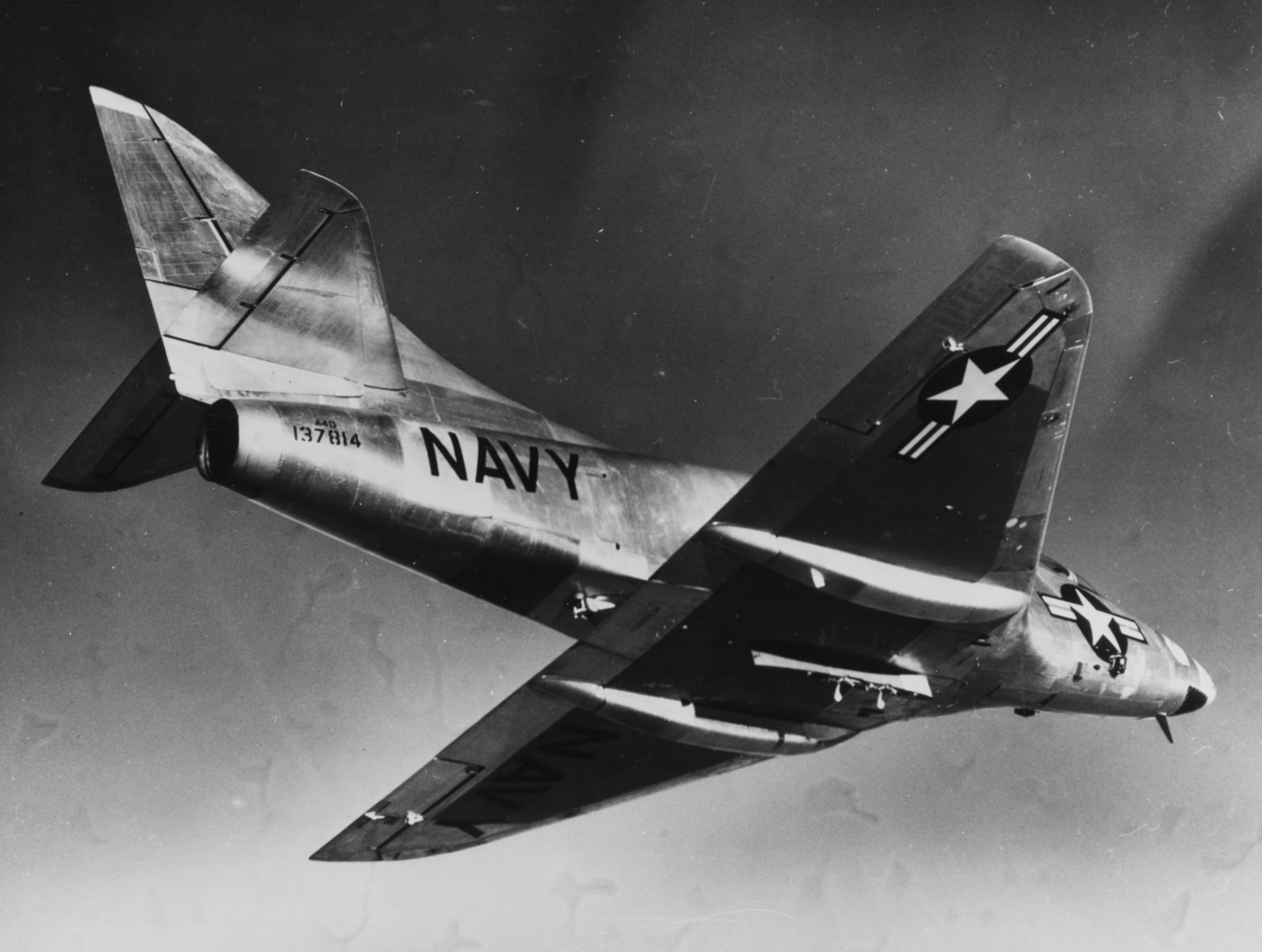
The second production A4D-1

The short-span delta wing did not require the complexity of wingtip folding, saving an estimated 200 pounds (91 kg). Its spars were machined from a single forging that spanned across both wingtips. The leading edge slats were designed to drop automatically at the appropriate speed by gravity and air pressure, saving weight and space by omitting actuation motors and switches. Similarly, the main undercarriage did not penetrate the main wing spar, designed so that when retracted, only the wheel itself was inside the wing and the undercarriage struts were housed in a fairing below the wing. Thus, the wing structure was lighter with the same overall strength. The rudder was constructed of a single panel reinforced with external ribs.

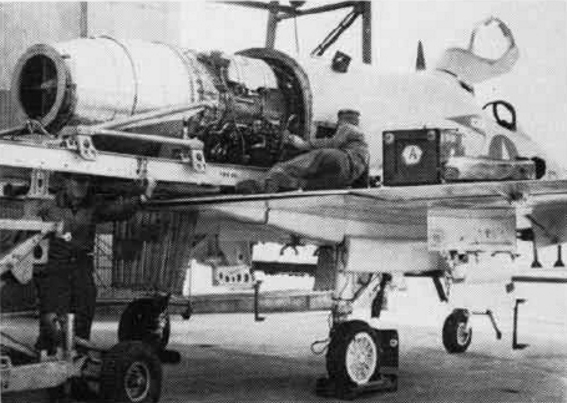
A4D Skyhawk with the rear fuselage removed and an engine being slid into place, Marine Corps Air Station Iwakuni, Japan, 1959

The aircraft's turbojet engine was accessed for service or replacement by removing the aft section of the fuselage and sliding out the engine. This obviated the need for access doors with their hinges and latches, further reducing weight and complexity. This is the opposite of what can often happen in aircraft design, where a small weight increase in one area leads to a compounding increase in weight in other areas such as wing area, engine power, empennage area, or structural improvements. These features are often added to compensate for the original increase in weight, and can trigger a vicious circle.

The A-4 pioneered the concept of "buddy" air-to-air refueling. This allows the aircraft to supply others of the same type, reducing the need for dedicated tanker aircraft—a particular advantage for small air arms or when operating in remote locations. This allows for greatly improved operational flexibility and reassurance against the loss or malfunction of tanker aircraft, though this procedure reduces the effective combat force on board the carrier.

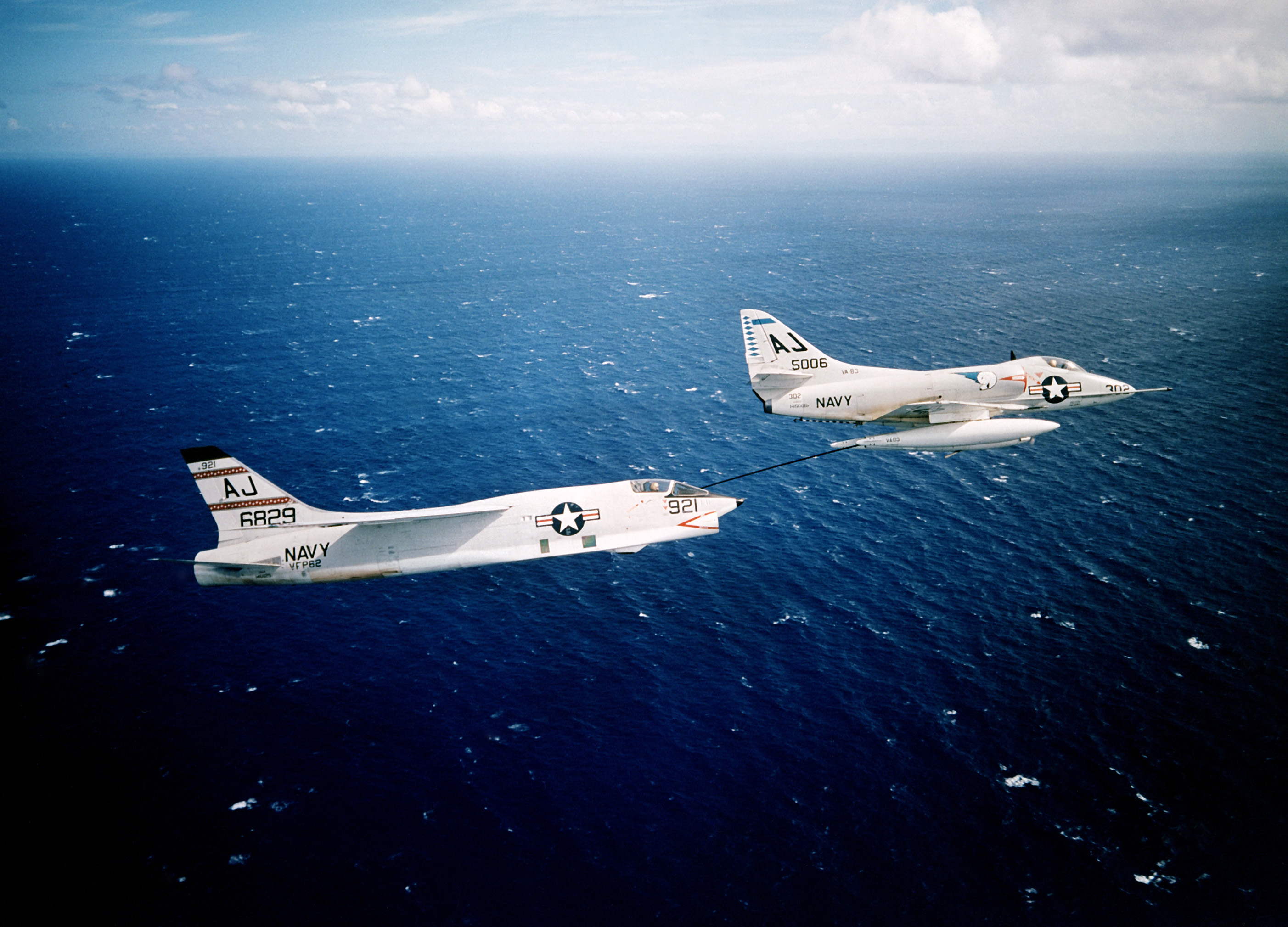
An A4D-2 (A-4B) refueling a F8U-1P (RF-8A)

A designated supply A-4 would mount a center-mounted "buddy store", a large external fuel tank with a hose reel in the aft section and an extensible drogue refueling bucket. This aircraft was fueled up without armament and launched first. Attack aircraft were armed to the maximum and were given as much fuel as was allowable by maximum takeoff weight limits, which was far less than a full tank. The standard operating procedure was to launch one Skyhawk as a tanker per launch-recovery cycle. In combat, two or three Skyhawk tankers were launched, especially if several groups of aircraft were attacking a heavily defended target.

Once airborne, they topped off their fuel tanks from the tanker using the A-4's fixed refueling probe on the starboard side of the aircraft nose. They could then sortie with both full armament and fuel loads. The A-4 was rarely used for refueling in U.S. service after the KA-3 Skywarrior tanker became available aboard the larger carriers.

The A-4 was also designed to be able to make an emergency landing, in the event of a hydraulic failure, on the two drop tanks nearly always carried by these aircraft. Such landings resulted in only minor damage to the nose of the aircraft, which could be repaired in less than an hour.

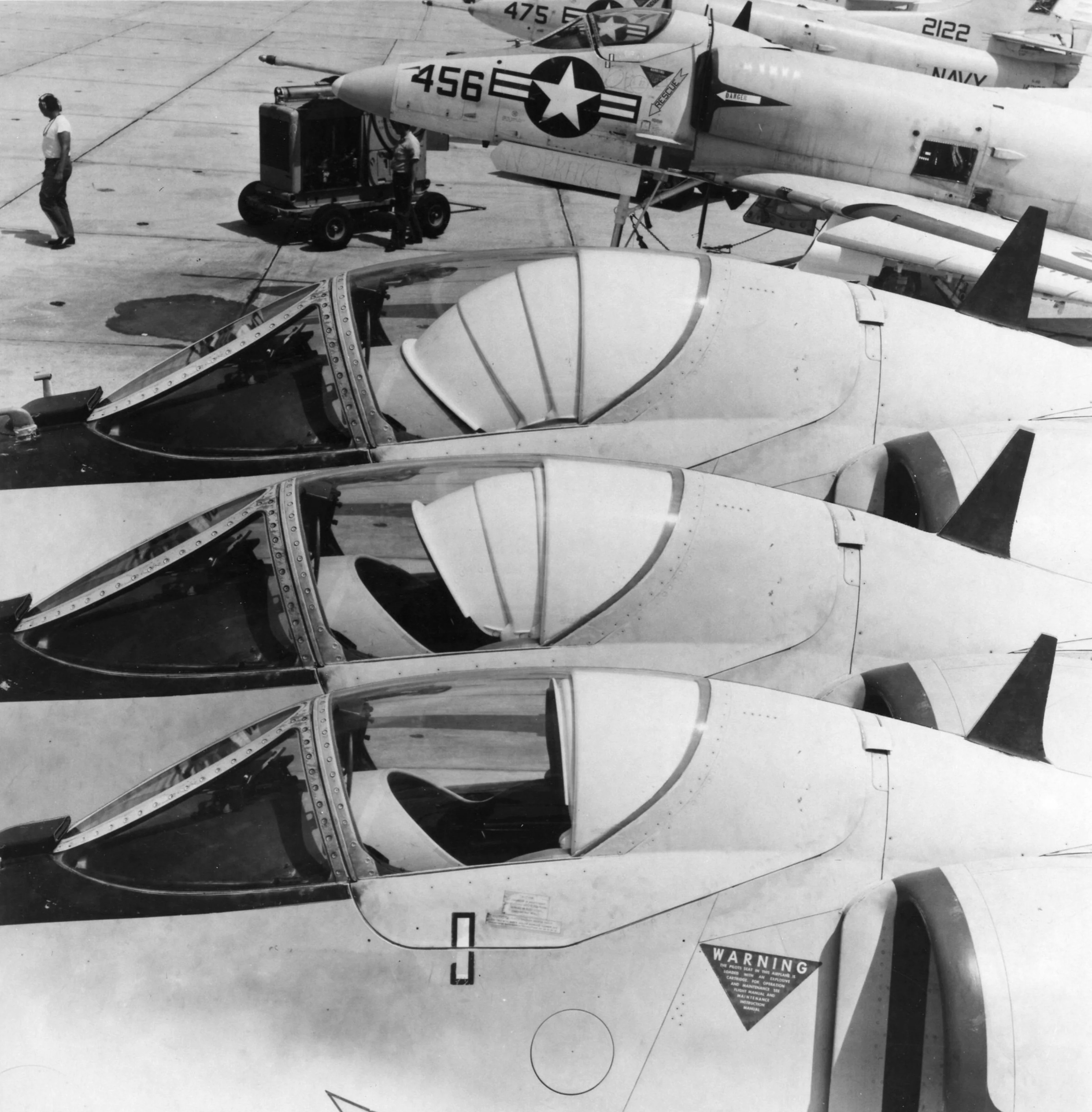
Thermal cockpit shield for nuclear weapons delivery

The USN issued a contract for the type on 12 June 1952, and the first prototype first flew from Edwards Air Force Base, California on 22 June 1954. Deliveries to Navy (VA-72) and Marine Corps (VMA-224) squadrons commenced in late 1956.

The Skyhawk remained in production until 1979, with 2,960 aircraft built, including 555 two-seat trainers. The last production A-4, an A-4M of Marine squadron VMA-331, had the flags of all nations that operated the A-4 painted on its fuselage sides.

== Operational history ==
=== United States ===
The Skyhawk proved to be a relatively common USN aircraft export. Due to its small size, it could be operated from older, smaller World War II-era aircraft carriers still used by smaller navies during the 1960s. These older ships often were unable to accommodate newer Navy fighters such as the F-4 Phantom II and F-8 Crusader, which were faster and more capable than the A-4, but significantly larger and heavier.

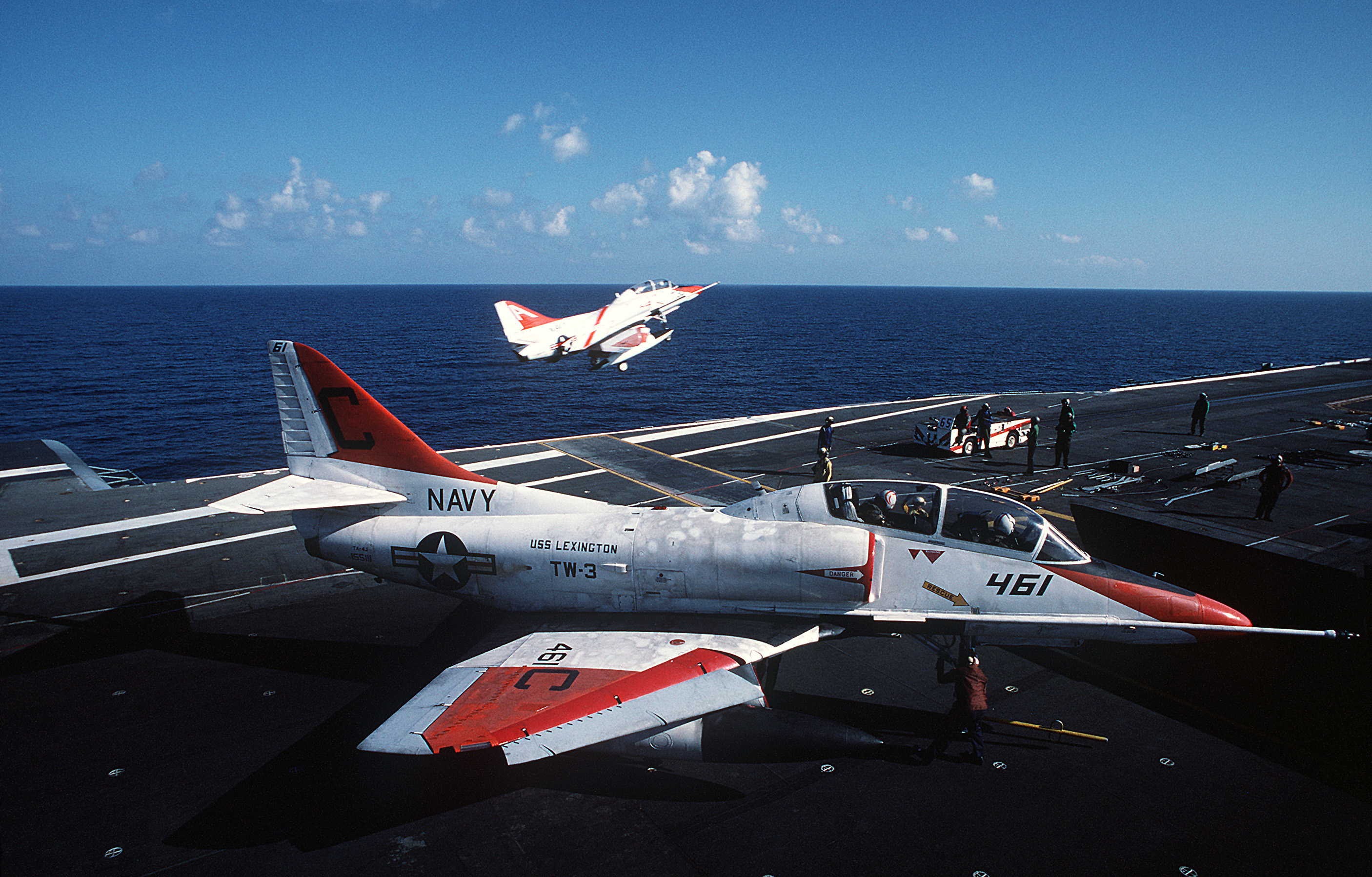
A USN TA-4J Skyhawk of TW-3 on the deck of USS Lexington, 1989

The USN operated the A-4 in both Regular Navy and Naval Reserve light-attack squadrons (VA). Although the A-4's use as a training and adversary aircraft continued well into the 1990s, the USN began removing the aircraft from its frontline attack squadrons in 1967, with the last ones (Super Foxes of VA-55/212/164) being retired in 1976.

The Marine Corps would not take the USN's replacement, the LTV A-7 Corsair II, instead keeping Skyhawks in service with both Regular Marine Corps and Marine Corps Reserve attack squadrons (VMA) and ordering the new A-4M model. The last USMC Skyhawk was delivered in 1979, and they were used until the mid-1980s before they were replaced by the equally small, but more versatile and expensive STOVL AV-8 Harrier II.

VMA-131, Marine Aircraft Group 49 (the Diamondbacks) retired its last four OA-4Ms on 22 June 1994. VMA-124, Marine Air Group 42 also retired the last of their A-4s in mid 1994. Trainer versions of the Skyhawk remained in USN service, however, finding a new lease on life with the advent of "adversary training", where the nimble A-4 was used as a stand-in for the Mikoyan-Gurevich MiG-17 in dissimilar air combat training (DACT). It served in that role at TOPGUN until 1999.

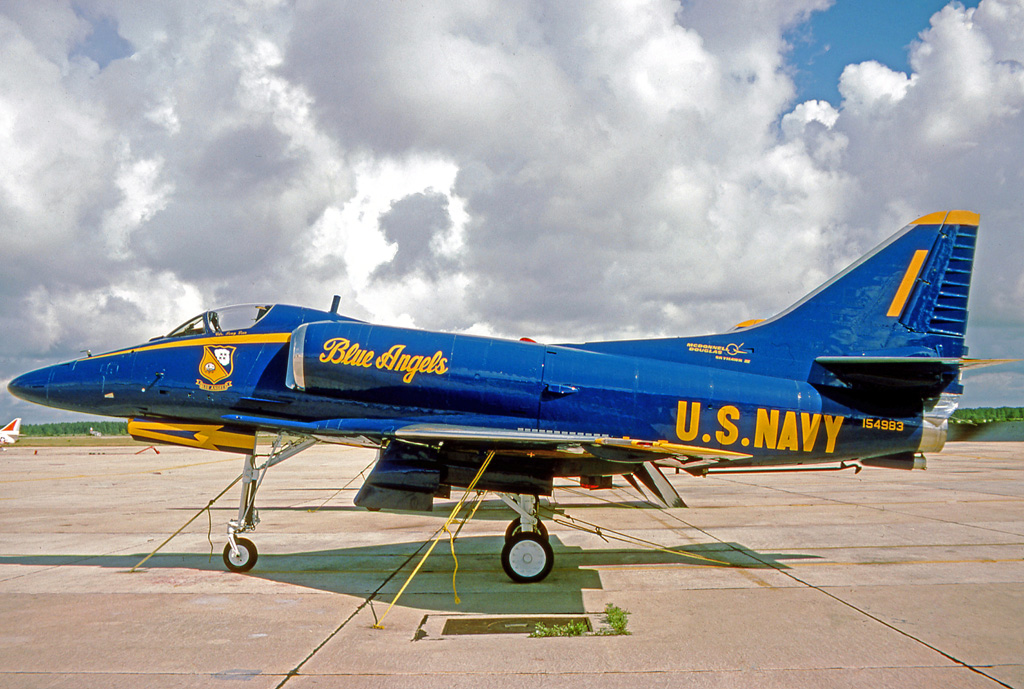
A-4F Skyhawk of the Blue Angels USN aerobatic team in 1975

The A-4's nimble performance also made it suitable to replace the McDonnell Douglas F-4 Phantom II when the Navy downsized its aircraft for the Blue Angels demonstration team, until McDonnell Douglas F/A-18 Hornets were available in the 1980s. The last USN Skyhawks, TA-4J models belonging to the composite squadron VC-8, remained in military use for target towing and as adversary aircraft for combat training at Naval Station Roosevelt Roads. These aircraft were officially retired on 3 May 2003.

Skyhawks were well loved by their crews for being tough and agile. These attributes, along with their low purchase and operating cost, as well as easy maintenance, have contributed to the popularity of the A-4 with American and international armed forces. Besides the U.S., at least four other nations have used Skyhawks in combat (Argentina, Indonesia, Israel, and Kuwait).

==== Vietnam War era ====
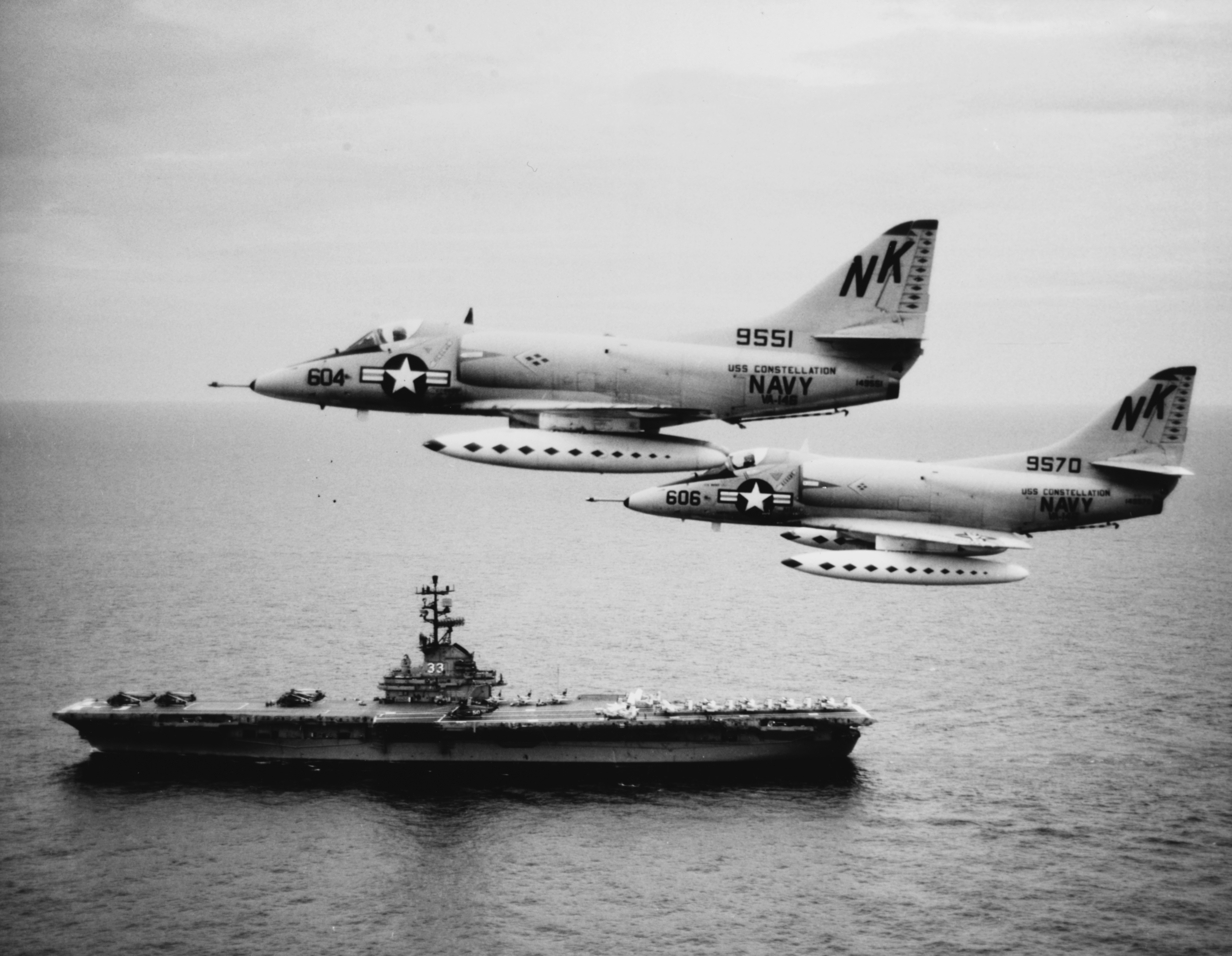
VA-146 A-4Cs over the Gulf of Tonkin in August 1964; USS Kearsarge steams below

Skyhawks were the USN's primary light-attack aircraft used over North Vietnam during the early years of the Vietnam War, later supplanted by the A-7 Corsair II in the light-attack role. Skyhawks carried out some of the first air strikes by the U.S. during the conflict, and a Marine Skyhawk is believed to have dropped the last American bombs on the country. Notable naval aviators who flew the Skyhawk included Lieutenant Commanders Everett Alvarez, Jr., John McCain, and Commander James Stockdale. On 1 May 1967, an A-4C Skyhawk piloted by Lieutenant Commander Theodore R. Swartz of VA-76 aboard the carrier USS Bon Homme Richard, shot down a North Vietnamese Air Force MiG-17 with an unguided Zuni rocket, serving as the Skyhawk's only air-to-air victory of the Vietnam War.

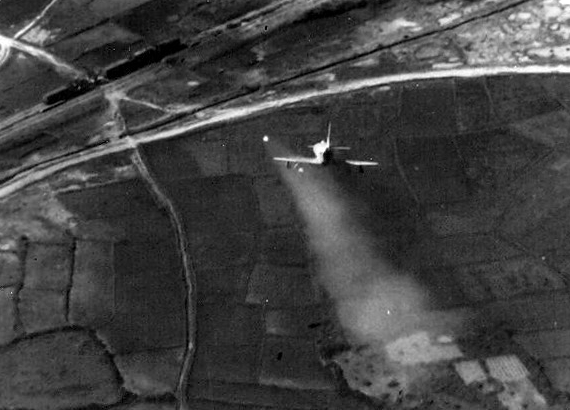
A USN A-4E is attacking a train in North Vietnam with a Zuni rocket.

From 1956 onwards, Navy Skyhawks were the first aircraft to be deployed outside of the U.S. armed with the AIM-9 Sidewinder. On strike missions, the Skyhawk's normal role, air-to-air armaments were used for self-defense. In the early to mid-1960s, standard USN A-4B Skyhawk squadrons were assigned to provide fighter protection for antisubmarine warfare (ASW) aircraft operating from some Essex-class ASW carriers; these aircraft retained their ground- and sea-attack capabilities. The A-4B lacked an air-to-air radar, and it required visual identification of targets and guidance from either ships or an airborne Grumman E-1 Tracer AEW aircraft.

Lightweight and safer to land on smaller decks, Skyhawks later also played a similar role flying from Australian, Argentinean, and Brazilian upgraded World War II-surplus light ASW carriers, which were unable to operate most large, modern fighters. Primary air-to-air missile (AAM) armament consisted of the internal 20 mm (.79 in) Colt cannons and ability to carry an AIM-9 Sidewinder missile on both underwing hardpoints, later additions of two more underwing hardpoints on some aircraft made for a total capacity of four AAMs.

Mark 4 Gunpod Operating Principles (1965) Official USN promotional film reel of the Mark 4 gun-pod aboard A-4 Skyhawks

The first combat loss of an A-4 occurred on 5 August 1964, when Lieutenant junior grade Everett Alvarez, of VA-144 aboard USS Constellation, was shot down while attacking enemy torpedo boats in North Vietnam. Alvarez safely ejected after being hit by antiaircraft artillery (AAA) fire and became the first USN prisoner of war (POW) . He was released as a POW on 12 February 1973. The last A-4 loss in the Vietnam War occurred on 26 September 1972, when USMC pilot Captain James P. Walsh, of VMA-211, flying close air support from Bien Hoa Air Base, South Vietnam, was hit by ground fire during the Battle of An Lộc. Captain Walsh ejected safely and was the last U.S. Marine to be taken prisoner during the war. He was released as a POW on 12 February 1973.

Although the first A-4Es were flown in Vietnam in early 1965, the A-4Cs continued to be used until late 1970. On 1 June 1965, the Chu Lai Short Airfield for Tactical Support was officially opened with the arrival of eight Skyhawks from Cubi Point, Philippine Islands. The group landed with the aid of arresting cables, refueled, and took off with the aid of JATO, with fuel and bombs to support Marine combat units. The Skyhawks were from Marine Attack Squadron VMA-225 and VMA-311.

Lieutenant Commander Michael J. Estocin of Attack Squadron 192 was posthumously awarded the Medal of Honor for his actions while flying surface-to-air missile (SAM) suppression during coordinated strikes against targets in Haiphong, North Vietnam, on 20 April and 26 April 1967.

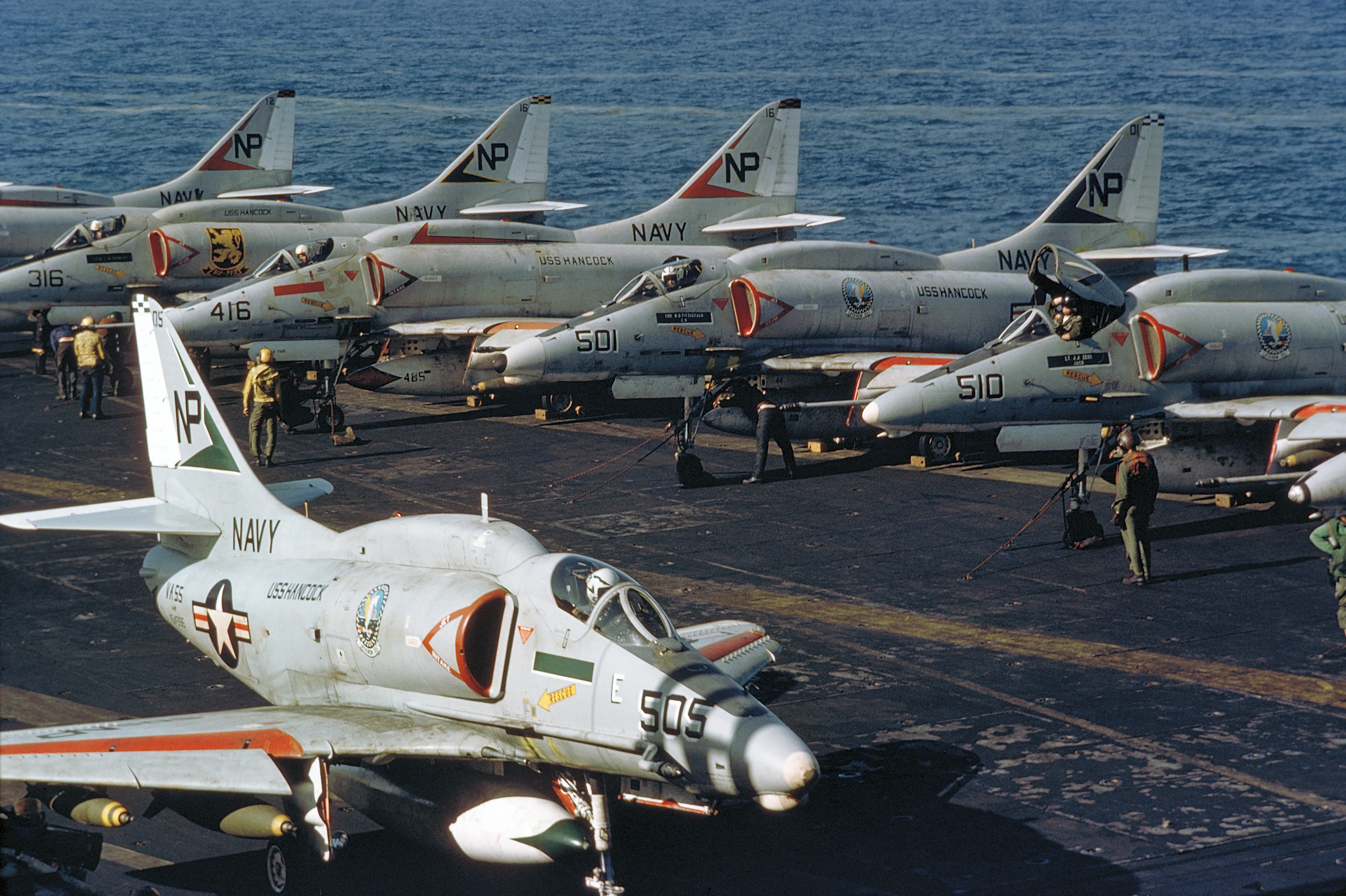
Armed A-4Fs on USS Hancock, 1972

On 29 July 1967, aircraft carrier USS Forrestal was conducting combat operations in the Gulf of Tonkin during the Vietnam War. A Zuni rocket misfired, striking an external tank on an A-4. Fuel from the leaking tank caught fire and spread to aged, unstable ordnance stored nearby, creating a massive conflagration that burned for hours, killing 134 sailors and injuring 161.

During the conflict, 362 A-4/TA-4F Skyhawks were lost due to all causes. The USN lost 271 A-4s, and the USMC lost 81 A-4s and 10 TA-4Fs. In total, 32 A-4s were lost to SAMs, and one A-4 was lost in aerial combat to a MiG-17 on 25 April 1967.

==== Training and adversary role ====
The Skyhawk, in the two-seat TA-4J configuration, was introduced to a training role replacing the TF-9J Cougar. The TA-4J served as the advanced jet trainer in white and orange markings for decades until being replaced by the T-45 Goshawk. Additional TA-4Js were assigned to Instrument Training RAGs at all the Navy master jet bases under RCVW-12 and RCVW-4. The Instrument RAGs initially provided jet transition training for naval aviators during the time when naval aviation still had a great number of propeller-driven aircraft and also provided annual instrument training and check rides for naval aviators. The assigned TA-4J models were installed with collapsible hoods so the aviator under training had to demonstrate instrument flying skills without any outside reference. These units were VF-126 at NAS Miramar, California; VA-127 (later VFA-127; NAS FALLON, NV) at NAS Lemoore, California; VF-43 at NAS Oceana, Virginia; and VA-45 (later VF-45) at NAS Cecil Field, Florida, until its later move to NAS Key West, Florida.

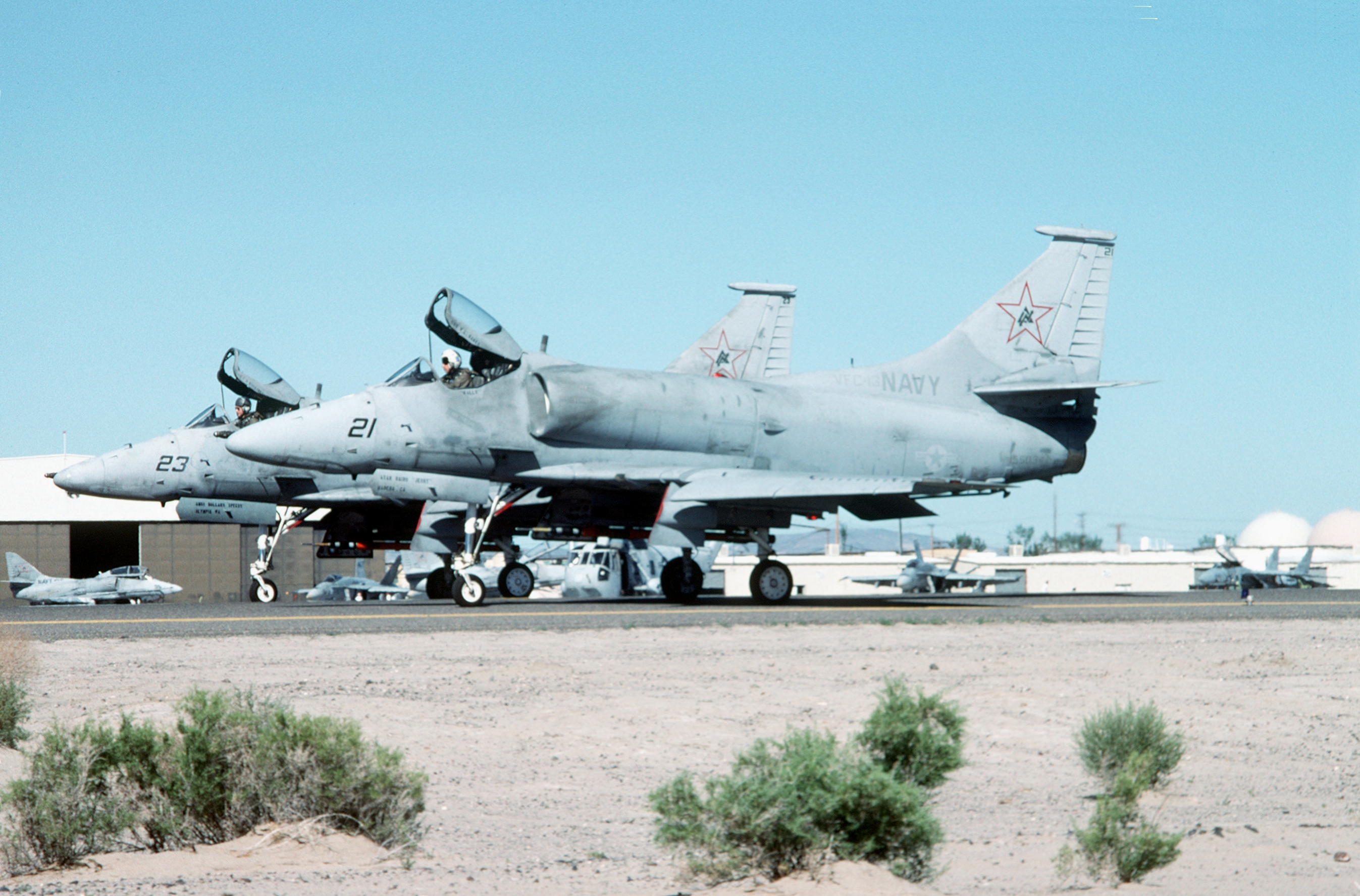
VFC-13 adversary A-4Fs at NAS Fallon, 1993

Additional single-seat Skyhawks were also assigned to composite squadrons (VC) worldwide to provide training and other services to deployed units. These included VC-1 at NAS Barbers Point, Hawaii; VC-7 at NAS Miramar, California; VC-5 at NAS Cubi Point, the Philippines; VC-8 at NS Roosevelt Roads, Puerto Rico; VC-10 at NAVBASE Guantánamo Bay, Cuba, and Naval Reserve squadrons VC-12 (later VFC-12) at NAS Oceana, Virginia, and VC-13 (later VFC-13) at NAS Miramar, California, until its later move to NAS Fallon, Nevada.

With renewed emphasis on air combat maneuvering (ACM) training brought on with the establishment of the Navy Fighter Weapons School (TOPGUN) in 1969, the availability of Skyhawks in both the Instrument RAGs and composite squadrons at the master jet bases presented a ready resource of the nimble Skyhawks that had become the TOPGUN preferred surrogate for the MiG-17. At the time, the F-4 Phantom had not performed as well as expected against the smaller North Vietnamese MiG-17 and MiG-21 opponents. TOPGUN introduced the notion of dissimilar air combat training (DACT) using modified A-4E/Fs. Modified aircraft, called "Mongoose", lost the dorsal hump, the 20 mm cannon with their ammo systems, and the external stores, although sometimes the centerline station was kept. The slats were fixed.

The small size of the Skyhawk and superb low-speed handling in the hands of a well-trained aviator made it ideal to teach fleet aviators the finer points of DACT. The squadrons eventually began to display vivid threat-type paint schemes signifying their transition into the primary role of adversary training. To better perform the adversary role, single-seat A-4E and F models were introduced to the role, but the ultimate adversary Skyhawk was the Super Fox, which was equipped with the uprated J52-P-408 engine. This variant entered service in 1974 with VA-55/VA-164/VA-212 on the final USS Hancock cruise and was the variant that the Blue Angels selected in 1973.

The surplus of former USMC Skyhawks resulted in A-4M versions being used by both VF-126 and TOPGUN. Though the A-4 was augmented by the F-5E, F-21 (Kfir), F-16, and F/A-18 in the adversary role, the A-4 remained a viable threat surrogate until it was retired by VF-43 in 1993 and shortly thereafter by VFC-12. The last A-4 fleet operators were VC-8, which retired its Skyhawks in 2003.

The A-4M was also operated by the Operations Maintenance Detachment in an adversary role based at NAS Dallas, Texas, for the Naval Air Reserve. Many of the aviators that flew the four jets were attached to NAS Dallas, including the Commanding Officer of the air station. The aircraft were instrumental in training and development of ACM for Naval Air Reserve fighter squadrons VF-201 and VF-202 flying the F-4 Phantom II and later the Grumman F-14 Tomcat. The unit also completed several missions involving target towing to NAS Key West, Florida; NAS Kingsville, Texas, and deployments to NAS Miramar, California and NAS Fallon, Nevada for adversary support. The detachment was under the operational command of the Commander Fleet Logistics Support Wing (CFLSW), also based at NAS Dallas.

=== Israel ===
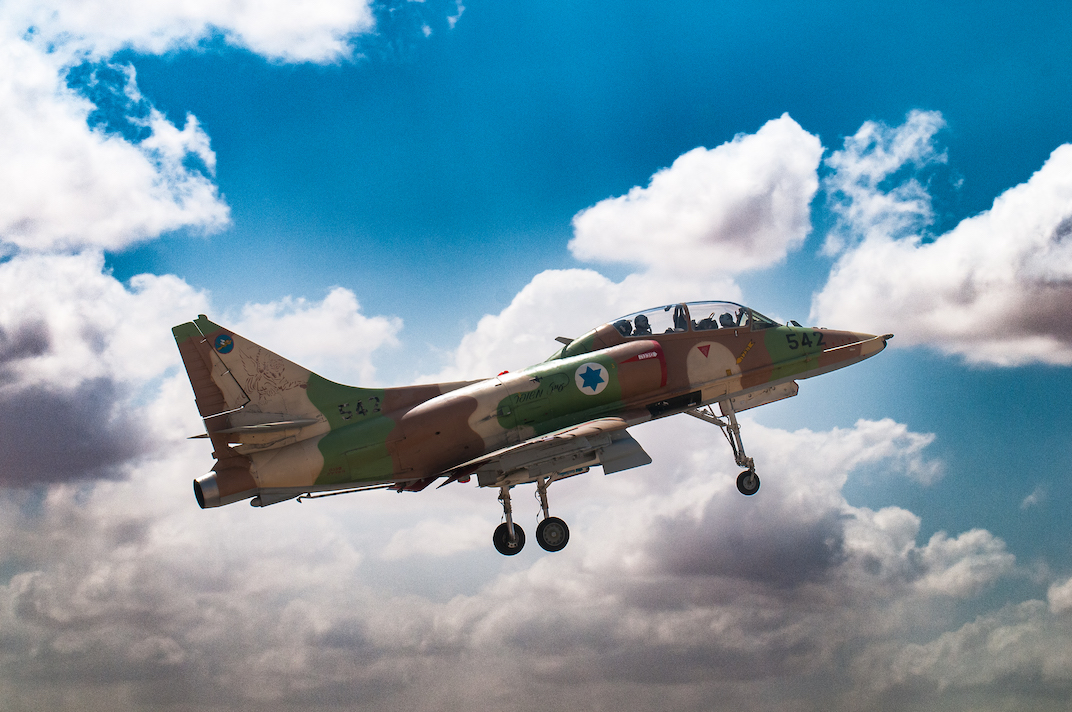
An IAF TA-4H takeoff: Note the extended tailpipe.

Israel was the largest export customer for the Skyhawk. The first Israeli request for the type was issued in 1964; the U.S. had not agreed to supply Skyhawks until February 1966, under certain conditions. The U.S. gradually provided numerous conventional munitions with which to arm the aircraft, but was initially limited, refusing to supply cluster bombs or napalm. The Skyhawk became the first U.S. warplane to be offered to the Israeli Air Force (IAF), marking the point where the U.S. took over France as Israel's chief military supplier. Deliveries began after the Six-Day War, and A-4s soon formed the backbone of the IAF's ground-attack force. In IAF service, the Skyhawk was named as the Ayit (Hebrew: עיט for Eagle).

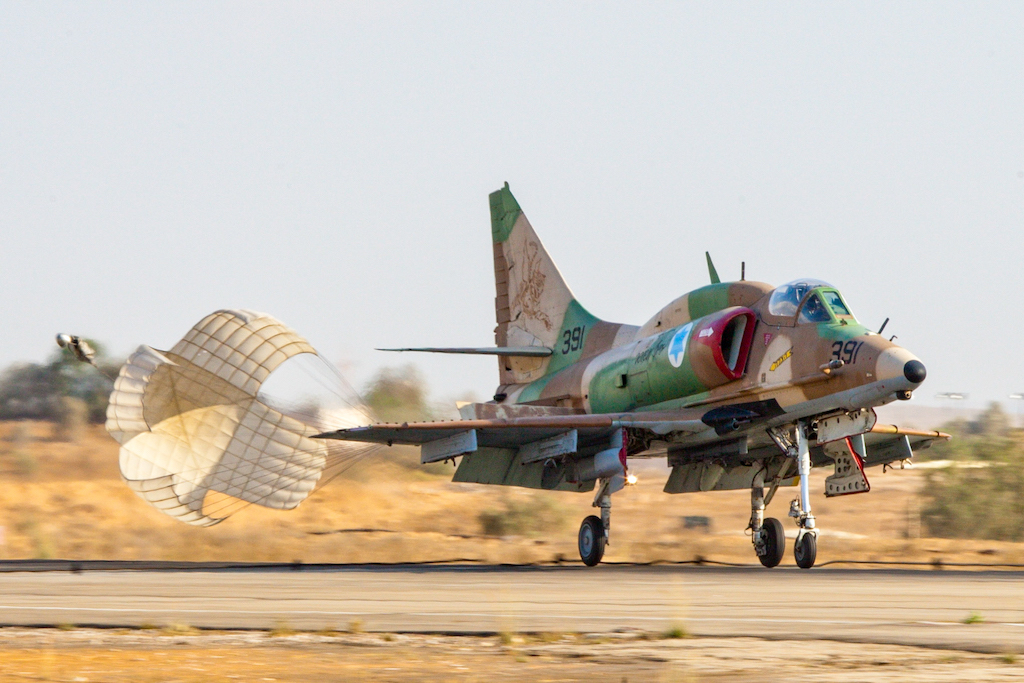
IAF A-4N Skyhawk drogue parachute landing in 2010

The aircraft had a relatively low cost, a quarter of what a Phantom II cost, while carrying half of its payload. Israel purchased 217 A-4s, plus another 46 that were transferred from U.S. units in Operation Nickel Grass to compensate for large losses during the Yom Kippur War. The first deliveries took place in December 1967. Skyhawks promptly began to replace Dassault Ouragan and Dassault Mystère IV in IAF service, providing greater speed, range, and lift capacity in comparison to these older types. The first combat mission took place on 15 February 1968, attacking artillery and military bases along the border with Jordan.

In the late 1960s and 1970s, IAF Skyhawks were the primary ground-attack aircraft in the War of Attrition and the Yom Kippur War. During July 1969, in response to Egyptian shelling of Israeli positions in the Sinai Peninsula, air strikes were conducted against Egyptian missile sites. On 6 February 1970, Skyhawks attacked the Egyptian port of Gardaka, sinking a minelayer as a result. Furthermore, skirmishes between IAF Skyhawks and Arab aircraft of various sorts frequently occurred. In May 1970, an IAF Skyhawk piloted by Col. Ezra Dotan shot down two MiG-17s over south Lebanon (one with unguided rockets, the other with 30 mm cannon fire) even though the Skyhawk's head-up display had no "air-to-air mode". However, up to three Skyhawks were downed by Egyptian MiG-21s, plus two were downed by Soviet-piloted MiG-21s during the War of Attrition.

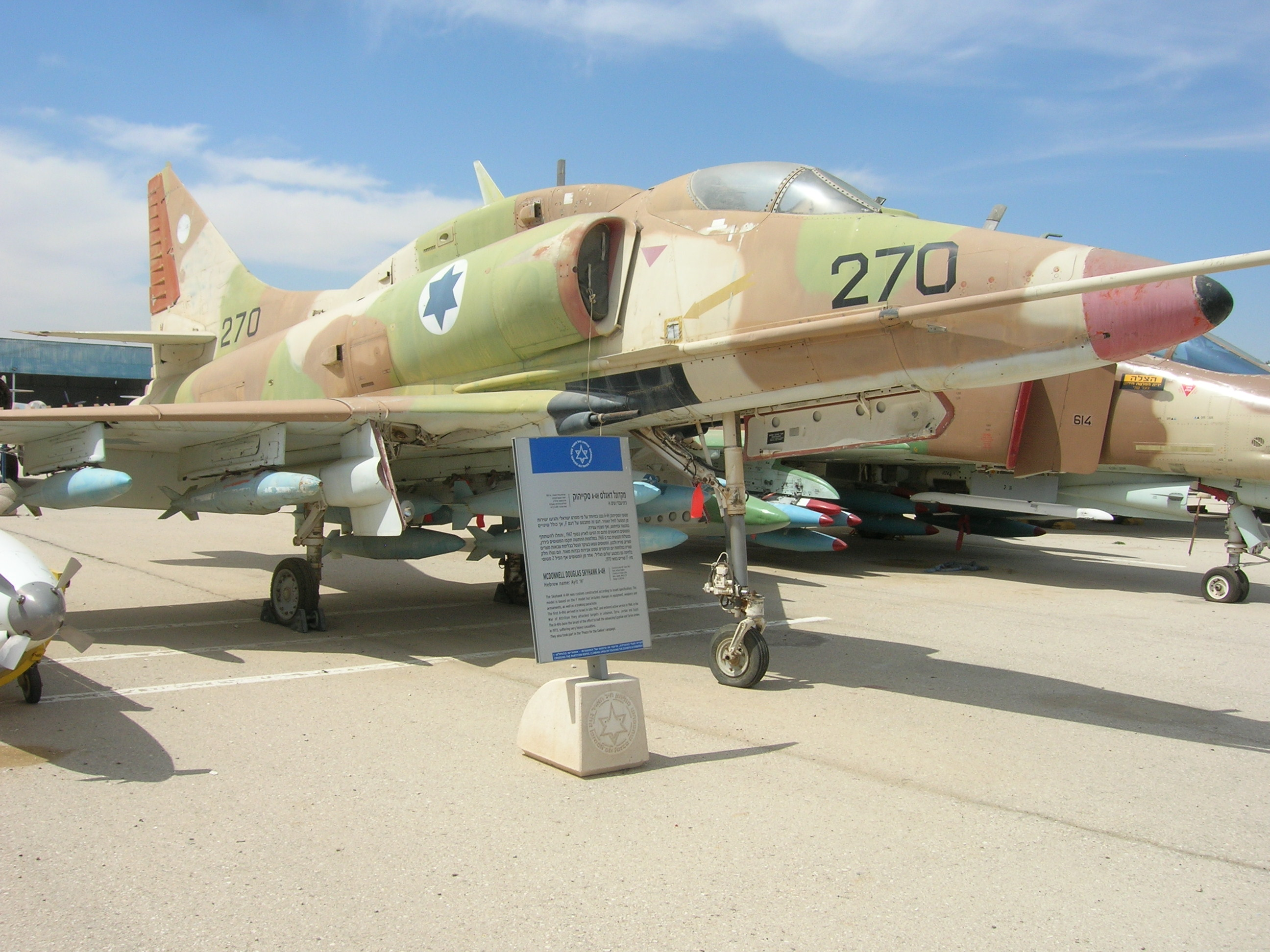
An Israeli Air Force A-4H Skyhawk on display

During the Yom Kippur War, IAF Skyhawks carried out numerous bombing missions, flying a considerable proportion of the tactical sorties made throughout the conflict. The vast majority of losses incurred were from surface to air missiles (SAMs); as many of thirty IAF aircraft were lost in a single day while resisting Egyptian and Syrian advances. To counter the radar-guided SAM threat, the Skyhawk's air brakes were used as improvised chaff dispensers. Improvements in tactics, such as the adoption of toss-bombing attacks, were also adopted in the latter part of the conflict. ACIG.org claims that at least nine Skyhawks were downed by MiG-21 and MiG-17 fighters during the Yom Kippur War. Formal Israeli sources claim only five IAF aircraft of any type were shot down in air-to-air duels.

A special version of the A-4 was developed for the IAF, the A-4H. This variant, an evolution of the A-4E, featured improved avionics and a new J52-P-8A engine. In place of the Colt Mk.12 20 mm cannons, it was integrally armed with twin DEFA 30 mm cannons manufactured in Israel. Later modifications included an avionics hump and an extended tailpipe, the latter which gave greater protection against heat-seeking surface-to-air missiles. A total of 90 A-4Hs were delivered. In early 1973, the improved A-4N Skyhawk for Israel entered service, based on the A-4M models used by the USMC. Both models of Skyhawks carried out bombing missions in the Yom Kippur War and a considerable proportion of the tactical sorties. They also participated in Operation Peace for the Galilee, with one unit shooting down a Syrian MiG-17.

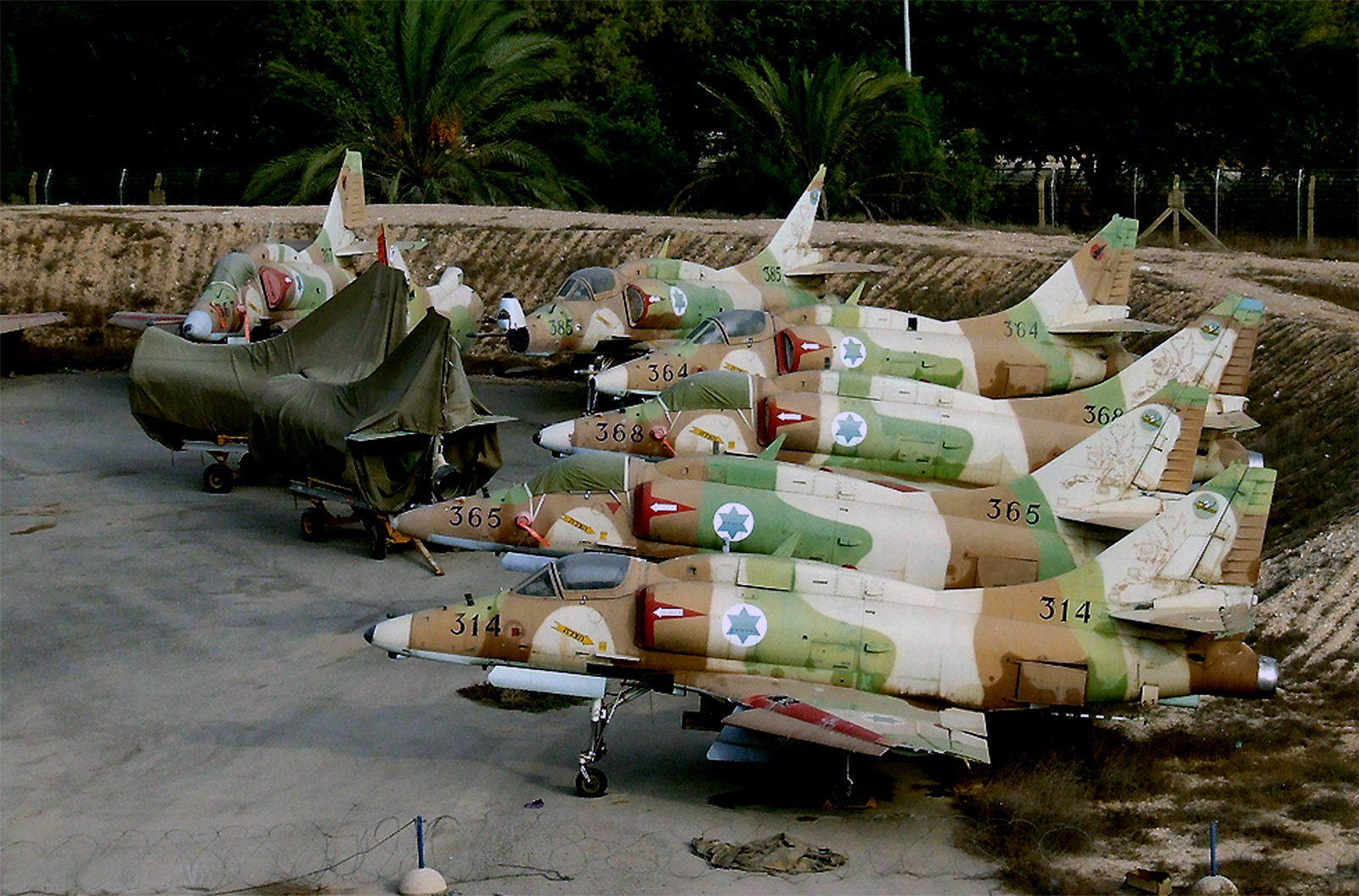
IAF A-4Ns awaiting disposal in 2009 following their retirement

The IAF also operated two-seat models, for operations and advanced training and retraining. The first training models arrived in 1967, with the first batch of Skyhawks. During the Yom Kippur War, the Skyhawk order of battle was reinforced with TA-4F and TA-4J models. In January 2003, the IAF selected RADA Electronic Industries Ltd. to upgrade its A-4 trainer fleet with weapons delivery, navigation, and training systems. Integration of a multifunction and Head-up Display produced an advanced Lead in fighter trainer for the IAF's future fighter pilots.

According to acig.org, Syria claimed that two Israeli Skyhawks were downed by Syrian MiG-23s over northern Lebanon on 26 April 1981. However, official IAF statistics do not list any downing of Israeli warplanes since the Yom Kippur War, and no loss of aircraft was reported on that date.

During the 1982 Lebanon War, an IAF A-4 piloted by Aharon Achiaz was shot down over Lebanon by a SA-7 on 6 June 1982. Israel reported this was one of its only two fixed-wing aircraft shot down over the Beqaa Valley during air battles spanning from 6 June 1982 to 11 June 1982, when 150 aircraft took part, including the battle on 9 June 1982 known as Operation Mole Cricket 19.

In October 2008, due to maintenance issues, IAF decided that the Skyhawk fleet would be withdrawn and replaced by more modern aircraft, able to perform equally well in the training role, and if required, close support and interdiction missions on the battlefield. Some of Israel's A-4s were later exported to Indonesia. The Skyhawks have been replaced by F-16s in combat roles, but are still used for pilot training. All the remaining A-4s were to be fully phased out beginning by 2014, as the IAF accepts delivery of Alenia Aermacchi M-346 Master jets. Skyhawks were last used in combat operations in the Israeli air force in 2012, when they dropped leaflets over Gaza.

In July 2013, Israel began a program called Teuza (boldness) for the purpose of turning some military bases into sales lots for obsolete IDF equipment. Older models that are not suited for Israel's modern, high-tech forces were to be sold off or sold for scrap if no buyers are found. Skyhawks were among those offerings.

On 13 December 2015, all remaining IAF Skyhawks were retired from service. The retirement ceremony took place at Hatzerim IDF base.

=== Argentina ===
Argentina was the first foreign user of the Skyhawk and had nearly 130 A-4s delivered since 1965. The Argentine Air Force received 25 A-4Bs in 1966 and another 25 in 1970, all refurbished in the United States by Lockheed Service Co. prior to their delivery as A-4P, although they were still locally known as A-4B. They had three weapons pylons and served in the 5th Air Brigade (Spanish: V Brigada Aérea). During 1976, 25 A-4Cs were ordered to replace the North American F-86 Sabres still in service in the 4th Air Brigade (Spanish: IV Brigada Aérea). They were received as is and refurbished to flight status by Air Force technicians at Río Cuarto, Córdoba. The C model had five weapons pylons and could use AIM-9B Sidewinder AAMs.

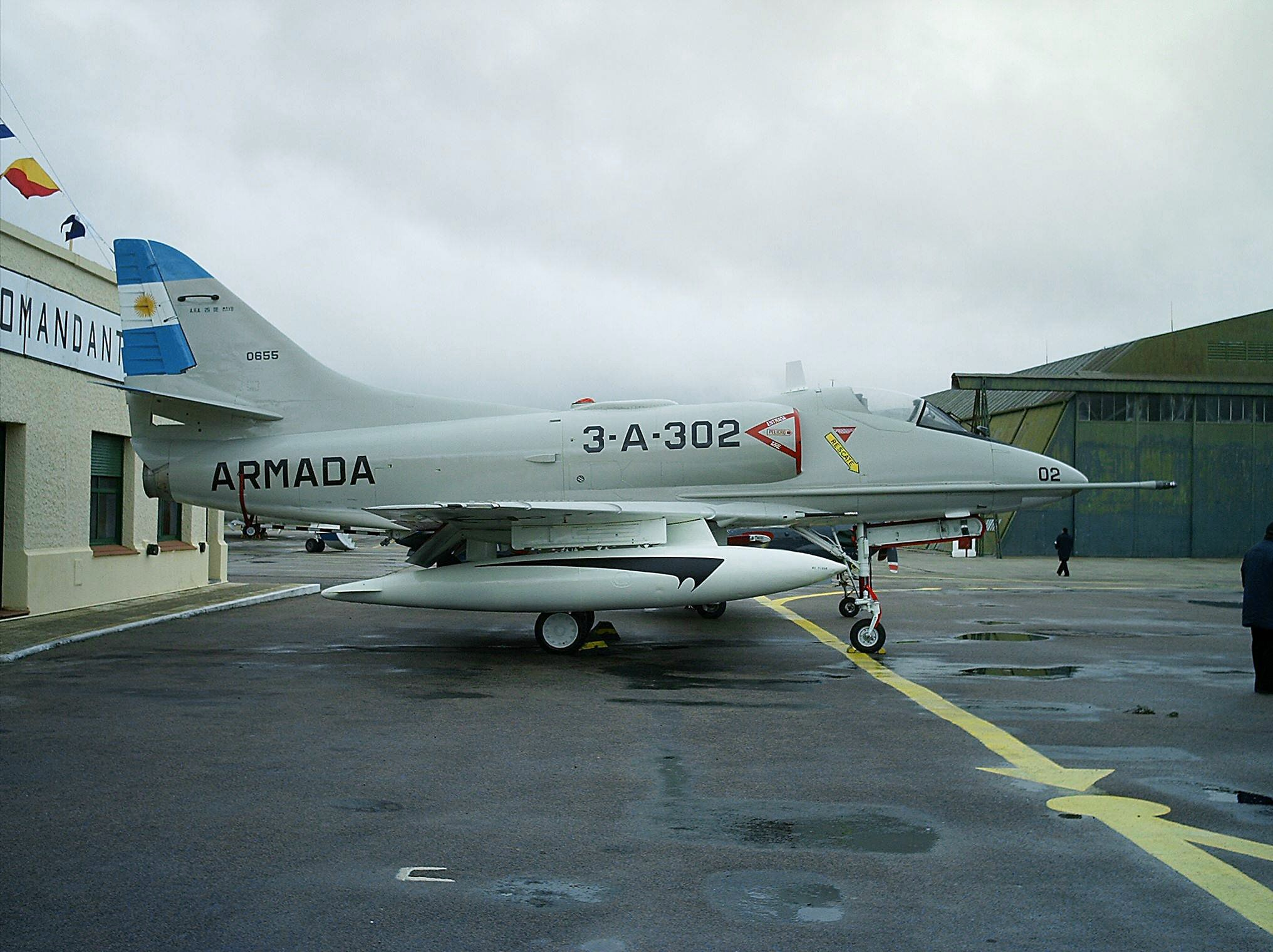
Argentine Navy A-4Q 0655/3-A-202 in 2007

The Argentine Naval Aviation also bought the Skyhawk known as A-4Q in the form of 16 A-4Bs in 1972, which unlike the Air Force's A-4Ps, were powered by 8,400 lbf (40 kN) J-65-W-20 engines and fitted to use Sidewinder AAMs. They were received in 1972 to be used mainly from the aircraft carrier ARA Veinticinco de Mayo by the 3rd Fighter/Attack Squadron (Spanish: 3ra Escuadrilla Aeronaval de Caza y Ataque). The first combat use of Argentina's Skyhawks took place amid a military revolt during December 1975, performing a single strike against rebels in Buenos Aires.

The U.S. placed an embargo of spare parts in 1977 due to the Dirty War, backing the Humphrey-Kennedy amendment to the Foreign Assistance Act of 1976, the Carter administration placed an embargo on the sale of arms and spare parts to Argentina and on the training of its military personnel (which was lifted in the 1990s under Carlos Menem's presidency when Argentina became a major non-NATO ally). Ejection seats did not work and they had many other mechanical faults. In spite of this, A-4s were still active during the 1982 Falklands War.

==== Falklands War ====
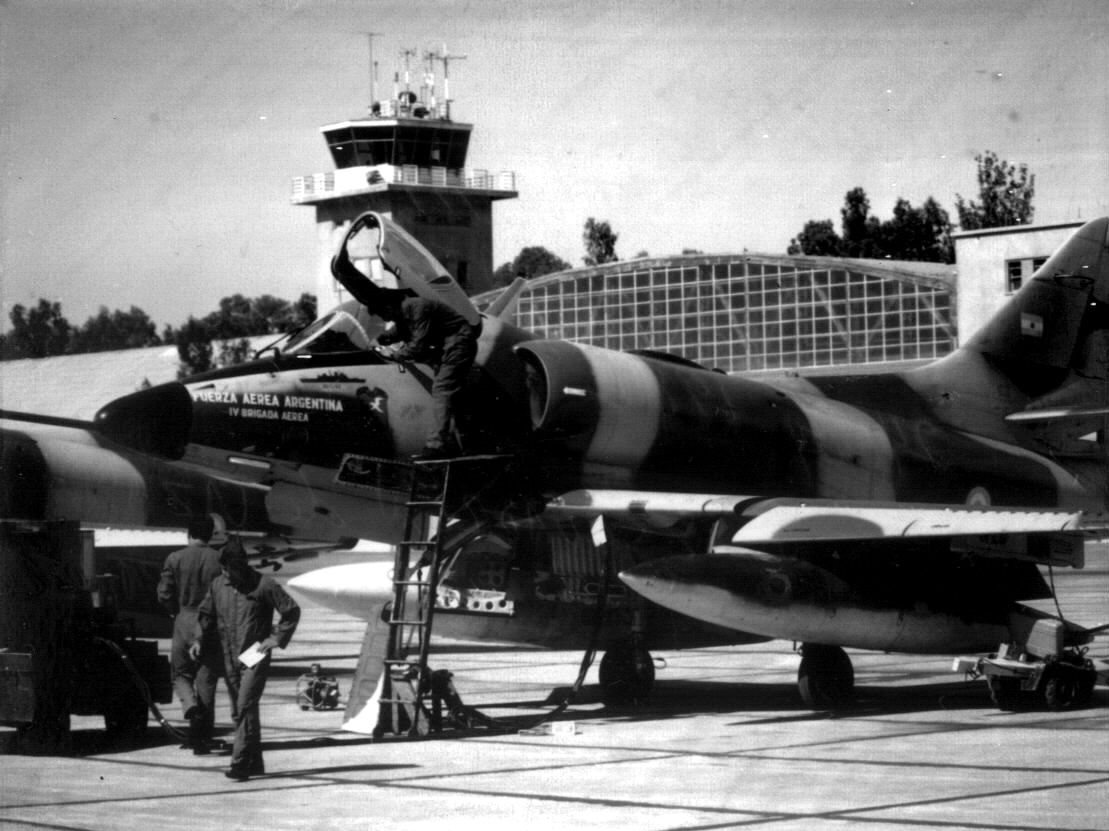
Argentine Air Force A-4C, May 1982

During the 1982 Falklands War, Argentina deployed 48 Skyhawks (26 A-4B, 12 A-4C, and 10 A-4Q aircraft). Armed with unguided bombs and lacking any electronic or missile self-defense, the Skyhawk could not effectively dogfight with Fleet Air Arm (FAA) British Aerospace Sea Harriers. Despite this, Argentine Air Force Skyhawks conducted numerous bombing missions against Royal Navy vessels, sinking the Type 42 destroyer Coventry and inflicted a variety of damage on several others: Type 21 frigate Antelope (subsequently sunk during attempted disposal of unexploded bombs), RFA Sir Galahad (subsequently scuttled as a war grave), Type 42 Glasgow, Leander-class frigate Argonaut, Type 22 frigate Broadsword, and RFA Sir Tristram.

Argentine Navy A-4Qs, flying from Río Grande, Tierra del Fuego, naval air station, also played a role in the bombing attacks against British ships, destroying the Type 21 Ardent.

In all, 22 Skyhawks (10 A-4Bs, nine A-4Cs, and three A-4Qs) were lost to all causes in the six-week-long war. These losses included eight to FAA Sea Harriers, seven to ship-launched surface-to-air missiles, four to ground-launched surface-to-air missiles and anti-aircraft fire (including one to "friendly fire"), and three to crashes. According to aviation author Jim Winchester, the Skyhawk was the most effective Argentine aircraft of the conflict.

==== Postwar ====
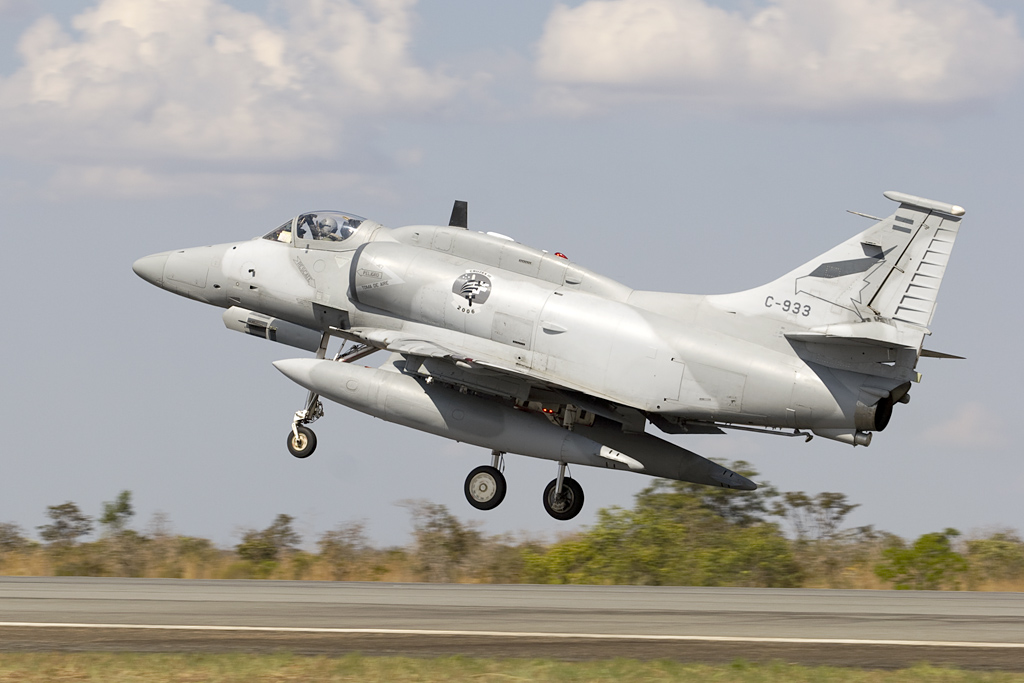
A-4AR Fightinghawk, 2006

After the war, Argentine Air Force A-4Ps and A-4Cs survivors were upgraded under the Halcón (Spanish for "falcon") program with 30 mm (1.2 in) DEFA cannons, AAMs, and other minor details, and merged into the 5th Air Brigade. All of these were withdrawn from service in 1999, and they were replaced with 36 of the much-improved Lockheed Martin OA/A-4AR Fightinghawk (rebuilt and modernised ex USMC A-4M). Several TA-4J and A-4E airframes were also delivered under the A-4AR program, mainly for spare parts use. The A-4AR was in service between the late 1990s and 2016 when the majority of the fleet was grounded for serviceability and age. A small number of airframes remained in service for limited roles. Three aircraft were lost to accidents.

In 1983, the United States vetoed the delivery by Israel of 24 A-4Hs for the Argentine Navy as the A-4Q replacement. The A-4Qs were finally retired in 1988.

=== Kuwait ===
During November 1974, the Kuwaiti government announced its intention to purchase 36 new-build Skyhawks, along with AIM-9 Sidewinder missiles, support apparatus, and spares in exchange for $250 million. Most of aircraft were supplied as single-seat A-4KUs while a handful of twin-seat TA-4KUs were also procured. By the end of 1978, all aircraft had been delivered and entered service with the Kuwaiti Air Force. During 1984, Kuwait reportedly put its Skyhawk fleet up for sale, but none were actually sold around this time.

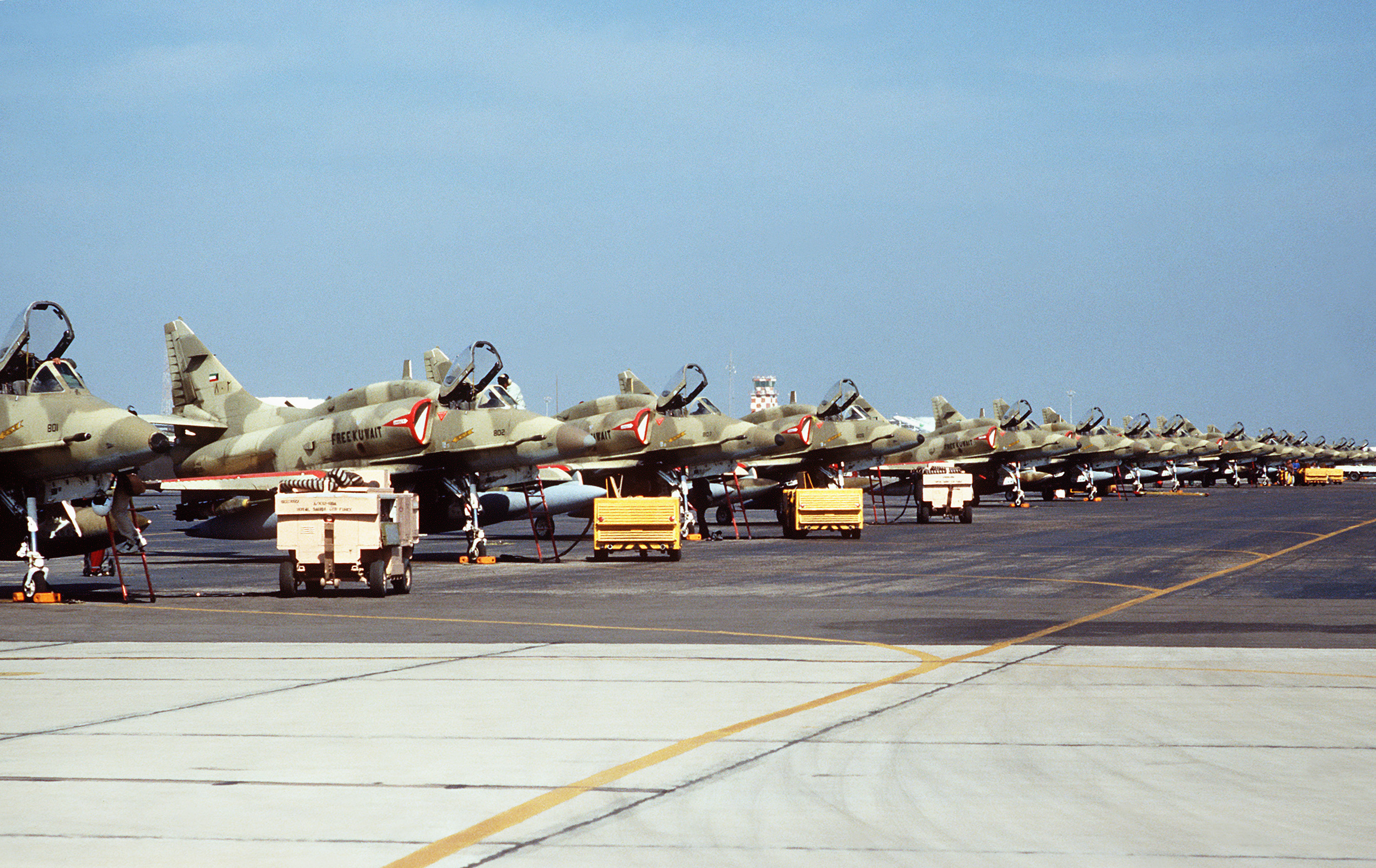
Kuwaiti A-4KUs on the flight line, 1991

In 1991, Kuwaiti Skyhawks participated in Operation Desert Storm. When Iraq invaded Kuwait, all available Skyhawks conducted attack missions against the advancing Iraqi forces, being operated from deserted roads after their bases were overrun; numerous Iraqi assault helicopters were destroyed by the Skyhawks prior to their withdrawal. As many as five aircraft were captured on the ground by Iraqi forces. Twenty-four of the 29 A-4KUs that remained in service with Kuwait escaped to Saudi Arabia. These Skyhawks (along with escaped Dassault Mirage F1s) operated as the Free Kuwait Air Force, flying 1,361 sorties during the liberation of Kuwait. Twenty-three A-4s survived the conflict and the Iraqi invasion, with only one A-4KU (KAF-828, BuNo. 160207) shot down by Iraqi radar-guided SAM on 17 January 1991. The pilot, Mohammed Mubarak, ejected and was taken prisoner.

During the early 1990s, as Kuwait awaited delivery of more capable McDonnell Douglas F/A-18 Hornet, protracted efforts were made to sell its remaining Skyhawks. Assisted by the U.S. State Department, fruitless negotiations took place with both Bosnia and the Philippines; in 1998, the fleet was sold to Brazil, where they served aboard the aircraft carrier NAe São Paulo prior to its decommissioning in February 2017.

=== Australia ===
Twenty A-4G Skyhawks were purchased by the Royal Australian Navy for operation from HMAS Melbourne. The aircraft were acquired in two batches of 10, in 1967 and 1971, and were primarily used to provide air defence for the fleet. Ten of the A-4Gs were destroyed in accidents, and all the survivors were sold to the Royal New Zealand Air Force in 1984.

=== New Zealand ===
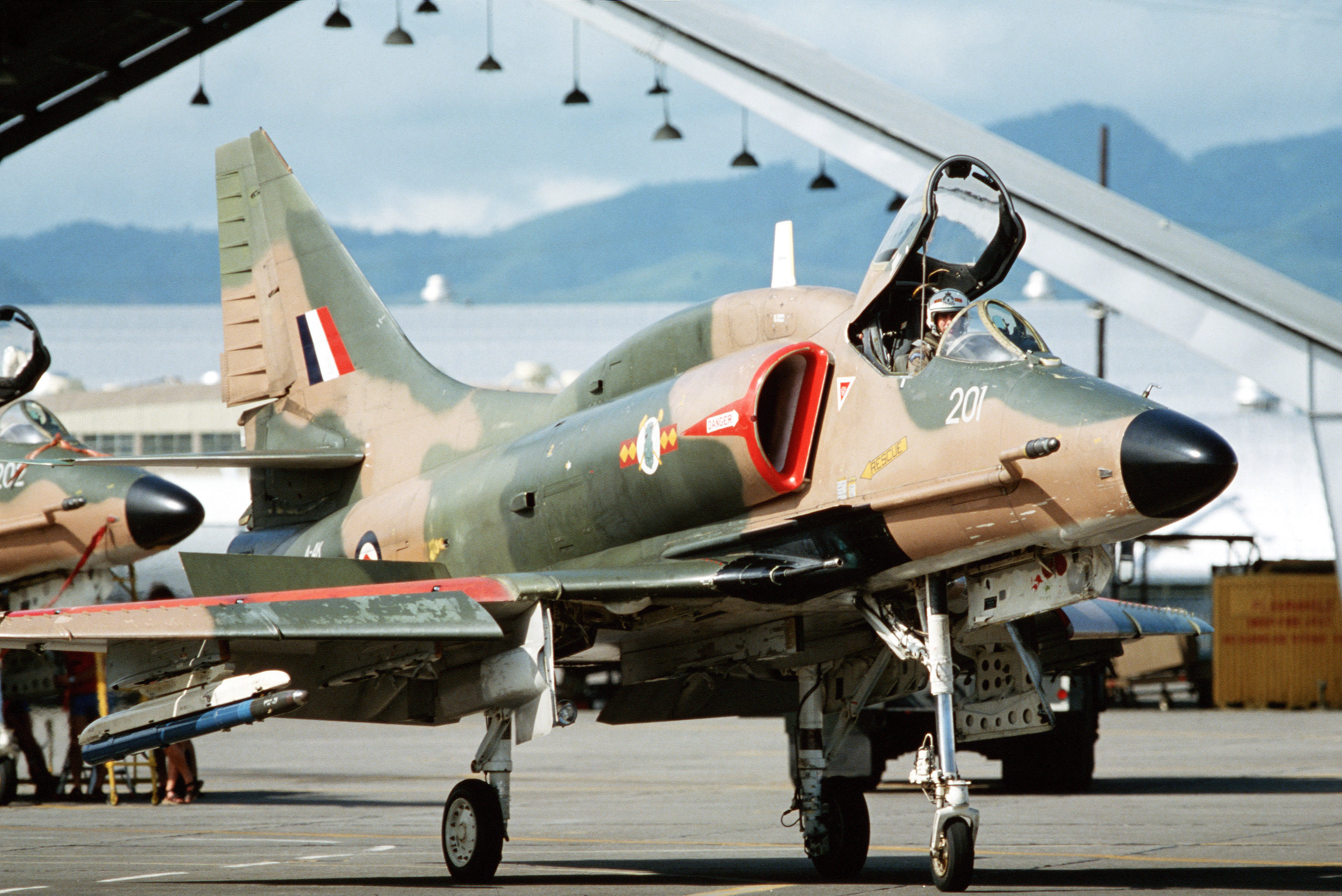
A RNZAF A-4K in 1982

During the 1960s, New Zealand considered various aircraft types, such as the Northrop F-5 Freedom Fighter and the F-4 Phantom II, before choosing to order 14 Skyhawks for the Royal New Zealand Air Force (RNZAF) under a $23 million deal for the aircraft, spare parts, support, and initial training. In 1970, 10 single-seat A-4Ks and four TA-4Ks were delivered to the RNZAF, joining No. 75 Squadron. Various early modifications were made, including the adoption of a cranked aerial refueling probe in place of the straight counterpart initially used. Various overseas deployments, often for ANZUS exercises, were conducted by the Skyhawk fleet throughout the 1970s and 1980s, often being escorted by up to three C-130 Hercules transport planes (carrying spares, support equipment, and ground crew) and a P-3 Orion to assist in navigation and communication.

In 1983, additional Skyhawks were acquired in the form of eight A-4Gs and two TA-4Gs from the Royal Australian Navy in 1984, which allowed a second Skyhawk-equipped squadron, No. 2 Squadron, to be formed. During 1986, Project Kahu was launched to upgrade the RNZAF's Skyhawks with new avionics, including an AN/APG-66 NZ radar based on that used by the F-16, and weapons, as a lower-cost alternative to buying new replacements. All 10 ex-RAN and the 12 surviving original RNZAF aircraft were converted to the A-4K Kahu standard. In addition to its primary duties, the type became heavily involved in training not just for the RNZAF but also RAN, the latter financially contributing to their operating costs through the 1990s as a result.

During 2001, the three Air Combat Force squadrons (Nos. 2, 14, and 75) were disbanded and the Skyhawks were put into storage awaiting sale. They were maintained, with occasional servicing flights, and then moved to RNZAF Base Woodbourne, where they were preserved in protective latex. Draken International signed an agreement with the New Zealand government in 2012 to purchase eight A-4Ks and associated equipment for its adversary training services. Six were former RAN A-4G airframes which as carrier aircraft had logged significantly fewer flying hours. These were subsequently relocated to the U.S. at Draken's Lakeland Linder International Airport facility in Lakeland, Florida. The other A-4K aircraft were given to museums in New Zealand and Australia.

=== Indonesia ===
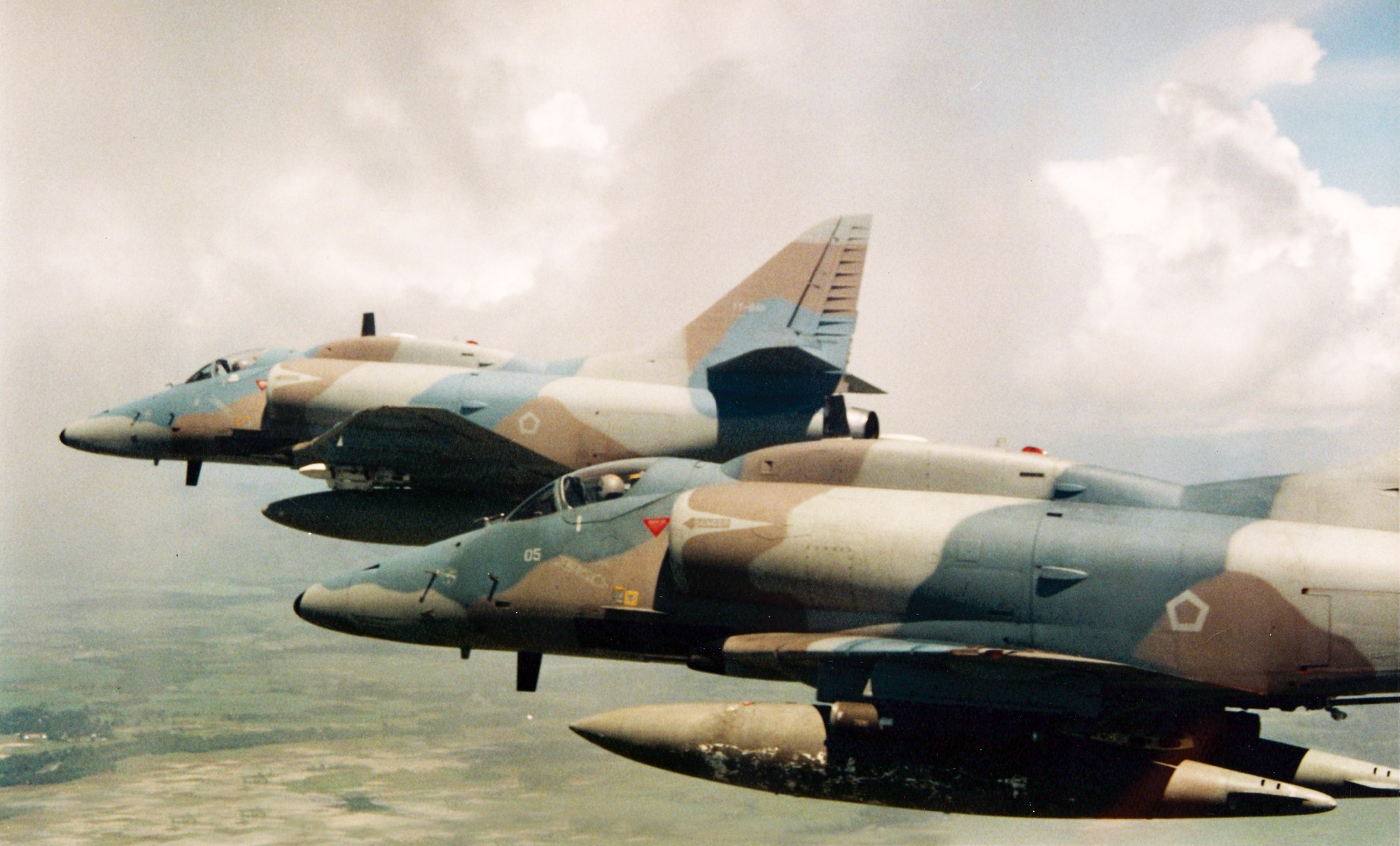
Indonesian A-4Es during a patrol

Due to the declining relationship between Indonesia and the Soviet Union after the events of 30 September Movement in mid 1960s, there was a lack of spare parts for military hardware supplied by the Communist Bloc. As a consequence, many of the Indonesian Air Force's modern combat aircraft, such as its MiGs and bomber fleet consisting of Il-28 Beagles and Tu-16 Badgers, were effectively inoperable by the early 1970s, and were subsequently grounded. During May 1978, U.S. Vice President Walter Mondale offered 16 Skyhawks to Indonesia; during the following year, Indonesia proceeded to acquire Skyhawks via a covert, joint operation with Israel, dubbed Operation Alpha. The operation was done confidentially because the two countries had no official diplomatic relations. These A-4s were chosen because the IDF were planning to retire its A-4 squadrons. Some of the Israeli-built avionics were stripped from the aircraft prior to being transferred.

During 1982, an additional 15 Skyhawks were purchased directly from U.S. stocks, undergoing refurbishment prior to delivery under a $27 million deal. Several more twin-seat Skyhawks were procured during the 1990s. Two squadrons operated the A-4 Skyhawks, the 11th Air Squadron at Iswahjudi Air Force Base in East Java and 12th Air Squadron at Roesmin Nurjadin Air Force Base in Riau.

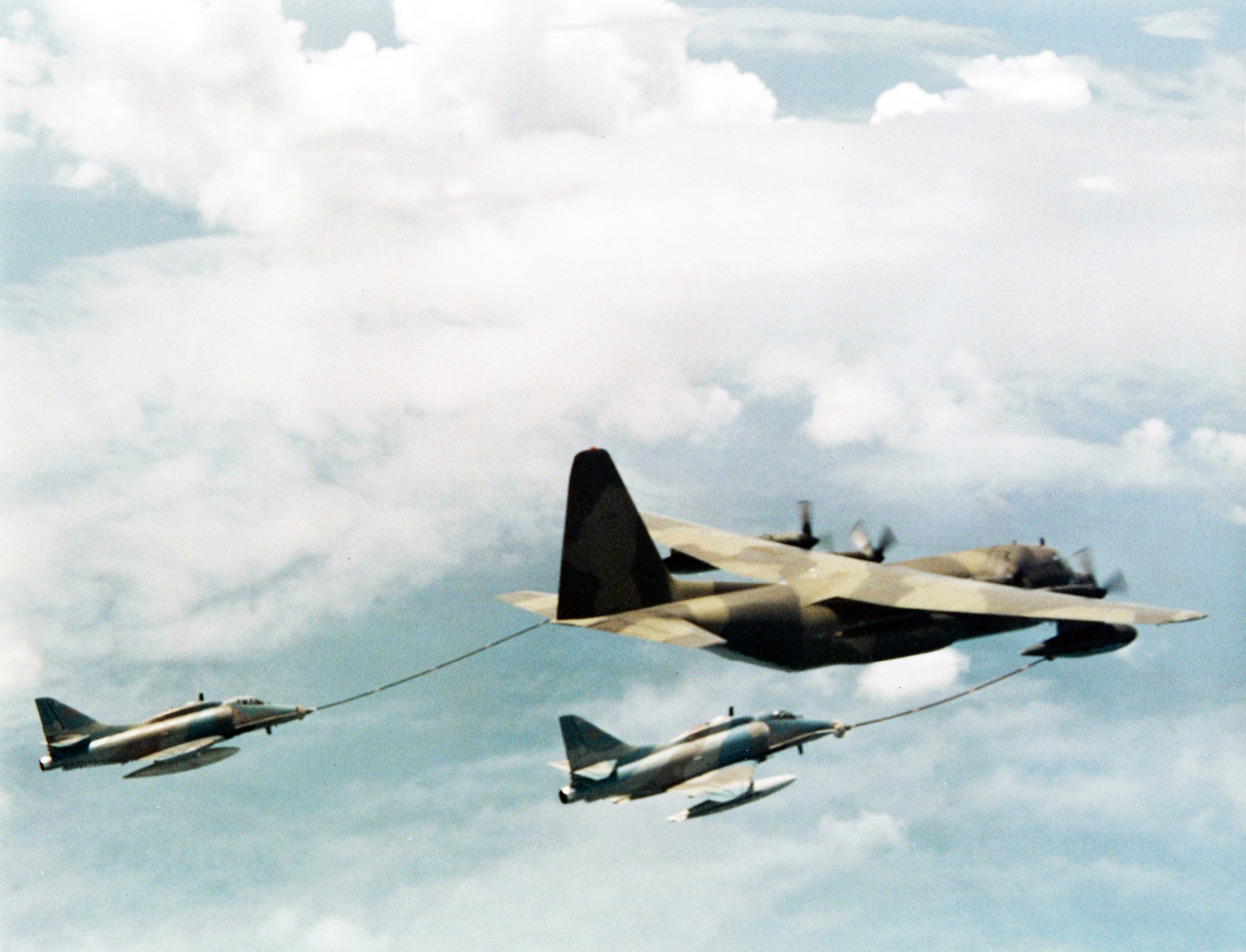
Two Indonesian A-4 Skyhawks being refueled by a KC-130B, c. 1990s

A flight of four A-4 Skyhawks was deployed to East Timor for counter-insurgency operations in a six-month combat tour in 1985–1986. During the deployment, they were based at Baucau Airport. The Skyhawks were mostly armed with 500 lb (230 kg) Mark 82 bombs. On 2 November 1987, the Indonesian Air Force launched a long-range strike mission against targets in East Timor using the Skyhawks. A flight of five A-4s, each armed with six 500 lbs Mark 82 bombs, two LAU-68 rocket pods, and two external fuel tanks, departed Iswahjudi Air Force Base in East Java for two-and-a-half-hour flight to East Timor. The flight was supported by a KC-130B Hercules for aerial refueling. The five A-4s attacked 30 designated targets in the Eastern Sector near Baucau, and then landed at Baucau Airport.

By 1999, only 19 aircraft were left operational, partially due to a lack of spare parts. The arrival of Sukhoi Su-27s during 2003 quickly led to the withdrawal of the Indonesian Air Force's remaining Skyhawks. On 5 August 2004, three A-4 Skyhawks with tail numbers TT-0431, TT-0440, and TL-0416 from 11th Air Squadron, based at Sultan Hasanuddin Air Force Base in Makassar, flew in the skies of Indonesia for the last time with the destination of Adisutjipto Air Force Base, Yogyakarta. Today, a sizeable number of the A-4s are preserved as museum pieces, monuments, or gate guardians; for example one is displayed in Satria Mandala Military Museum, and the other in the Dirgantara Mandala Air Force Museum.

=== Malaysia ===
In 1982, Malaysia purchased 80 refurbished A-4Cs and A-4Ls under a modernization program called PERISTA. Forty of the airframes were upgraded with the Hughes AN/ASB-19 angle rate bombing system, air refueling capability, and increased payload, while the rest were kept in the U.S. as a reserve and as a source of spare parts. This modified version was redesignated as A-4PTM and was unique to Malaysia. Deliveries took place between 1984 and 1985.

The Skyhawks were operated by the Royal Malaysian Air Force (RMAF), serving in the No.6 and No.9 RMAF Squadrons, based at Kuantan air base. During the late 1980s, Argentina attempted to barter for Skyhawks from Malaysia in exchange for FMA IA-63 Pampa aircraft and ground vehicles, but no such transaction took place. While in RMAF service, the type suffered from frequent maintenance issues and a high accident rate; this is believed to have contributed to the type's relatively short service life. In 1995, the Skyhawk fleet was retired and remaining examples were stored outside, while the RMAF replaced the type with the BAE Systems Hawk. Malaysia reportedly expressed interest in acquiring Skyhawks from New Zealand during the 2000s.

=== Brazil ===
As of 2014, Brazil was the latest Skyhawk customer. In 1997, Brazil negotiated a $70 million (~$130 million in 2025) contract for purchase of 20 A-4KUs and three TA-4KU Skyhawks from Kuwait. Kuwait's Skyhawks, modified A-4Ms and TA-4Js delivered in 1977, were among the last of those models built by Douglas. The aircraft were selected by Brazil because of their low flight time, excellent physical condition, and a favorable price. The Brazilian Navy re-designated AF-1 and AF-1A Falcões (Hawks), the Kuwaiti Skyhawks arrived in Arraial do Cabo on 5 September 1998.

On 18 January 2001, an AF-1 trapped aboard the Brazilian aircraft carrier Minas Gerais was later successfully catapulted, making Brazil's fixed-wing carrier force operational again after nearly two decades. To replace the aging Minas Gerais, Brazil purchased the surplus French aircraft carrier Foch (R99) on 15 November 2001. Renamed Brazilian aircraft carrier São Paulo (A12), the "new" carrier received extensive refitting before becoming operational during 2003. Minas Gerais was decommissioned that same year and later put up for sale.

On 14 April 2009, Embraer signed a contract to modernize 12 Brazilian Navy aircraft, nine AF-1s (single-seat) and three AF-1As (two-seat), with the aim of restoring the operating capacity of the Navy 1st Intercept and Attack Plane Squadron. The program included restoring the aircraft and their current systems, as well as implementing new avionics, radar, power production, and autonomous oxygen-generating systems. The first of the 12 modified Skyhawks was delivered on 27 May 2015. Embraer stated the modifications will allow the aircraft to remain operational until 2025.

In 2017, the Brazilian Navy indicated that it was reconsidering the total number of aircraft to be modernized to AF-1B/C standard due to budget constraints and the decommissioning of the São Paulo. Two AF-1Bs were delivered in 2015 and a further two of undisclosed type were to be delivered in 2017. Despite the loss of its only carrier, the Navy is thought to have wanted to retain the experience of carrier-based operations, thus would not rescind the contract outright. As of 2022, three A-4s were in service, with three used for training and the other aircraft on display.

=== Others ===
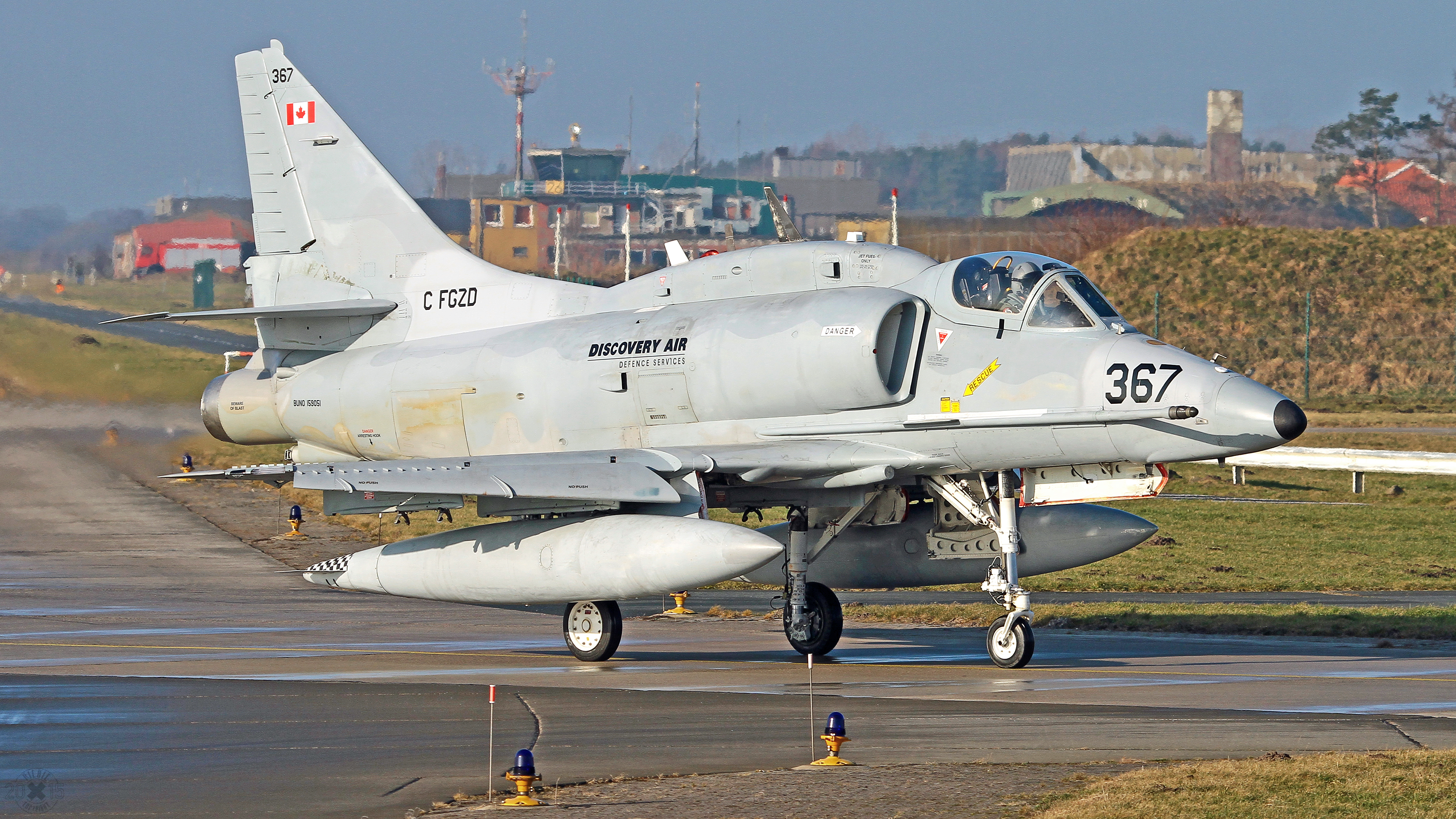
Discovery Air A-4

Top Aces, formerly Discovery Air Defense Services, a private Canadian company contracted by the Canadian Armed Forces, Australian Defence Force, and Bundeswehr to provide air combat and fighter training, imported and registered 10 A-4N and TA-4J aircraft. Discovery upgraded and modified the jets to be capable of electronic warfare training. Top Aces also operates A-4Ns under contract for training of the German Armed Forces (Bundeswehr). Another major civil user of A-4s for training support to military forces is US-based Draken International, which operates ex-New Zealand A-4Ks as part of a diverse fleet of jets. A-4s have previously been operated in the target support role in Germany by Tracor Flight Systems. Legionnaire International owns seven A-4L models and one TA-4J, which are used for weapons RDT&E programs, as well as radar and electronic warfare testing and training.

== Variants ==
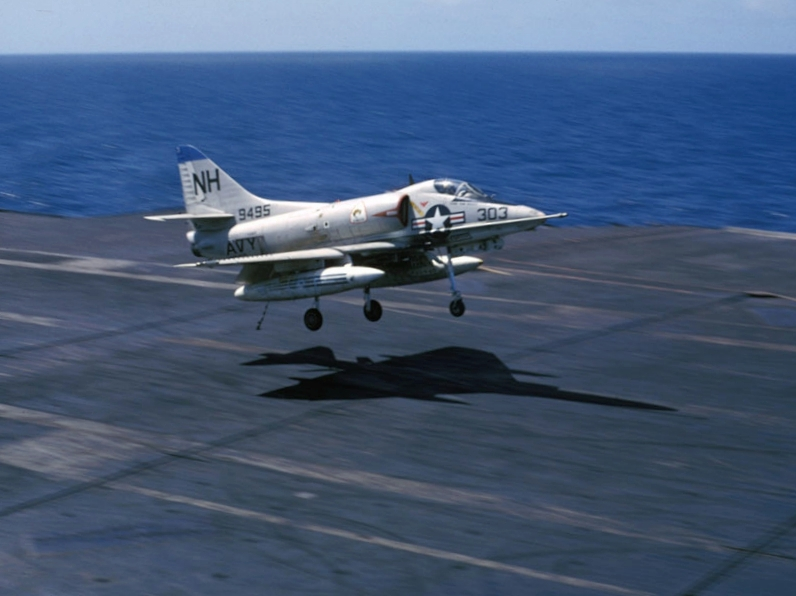
A-4C landing on USS Kitty Hawk in 1966.

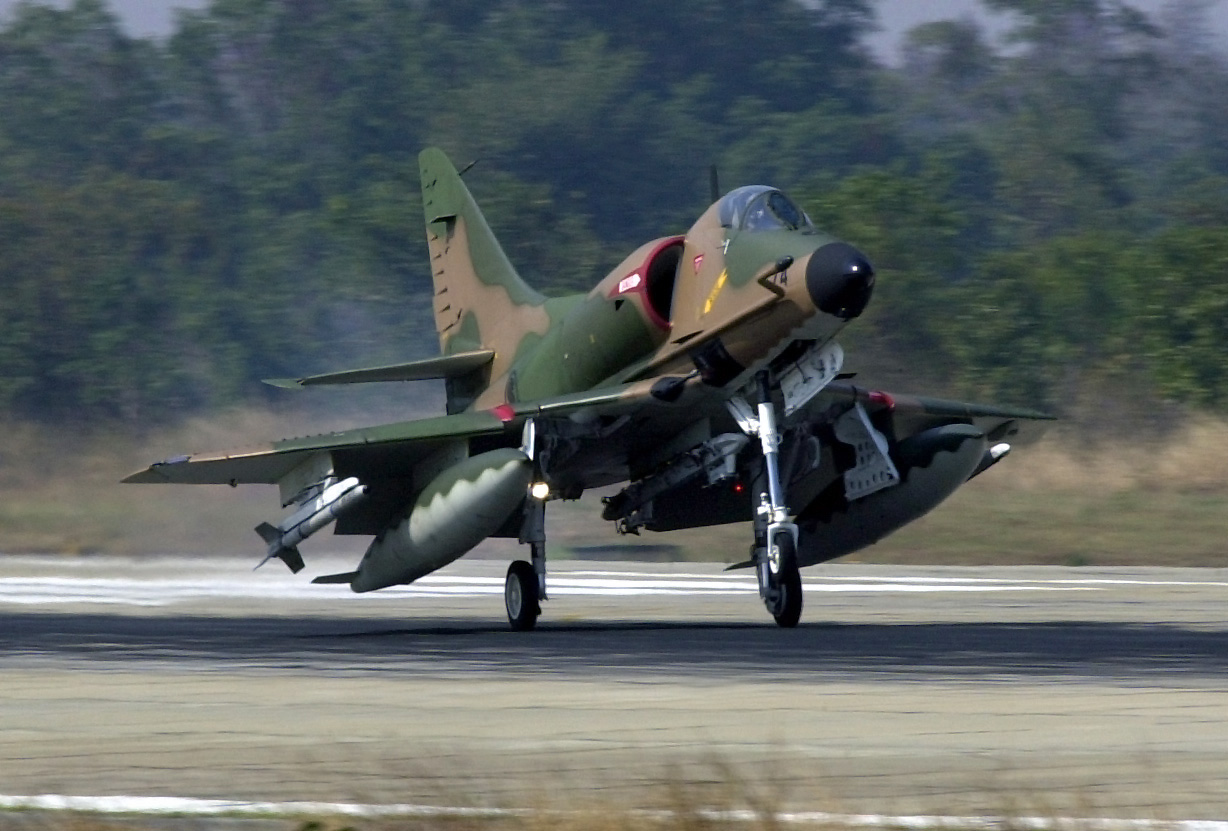
Republic of Singapore Air Force A-4SU Super Skyhawk

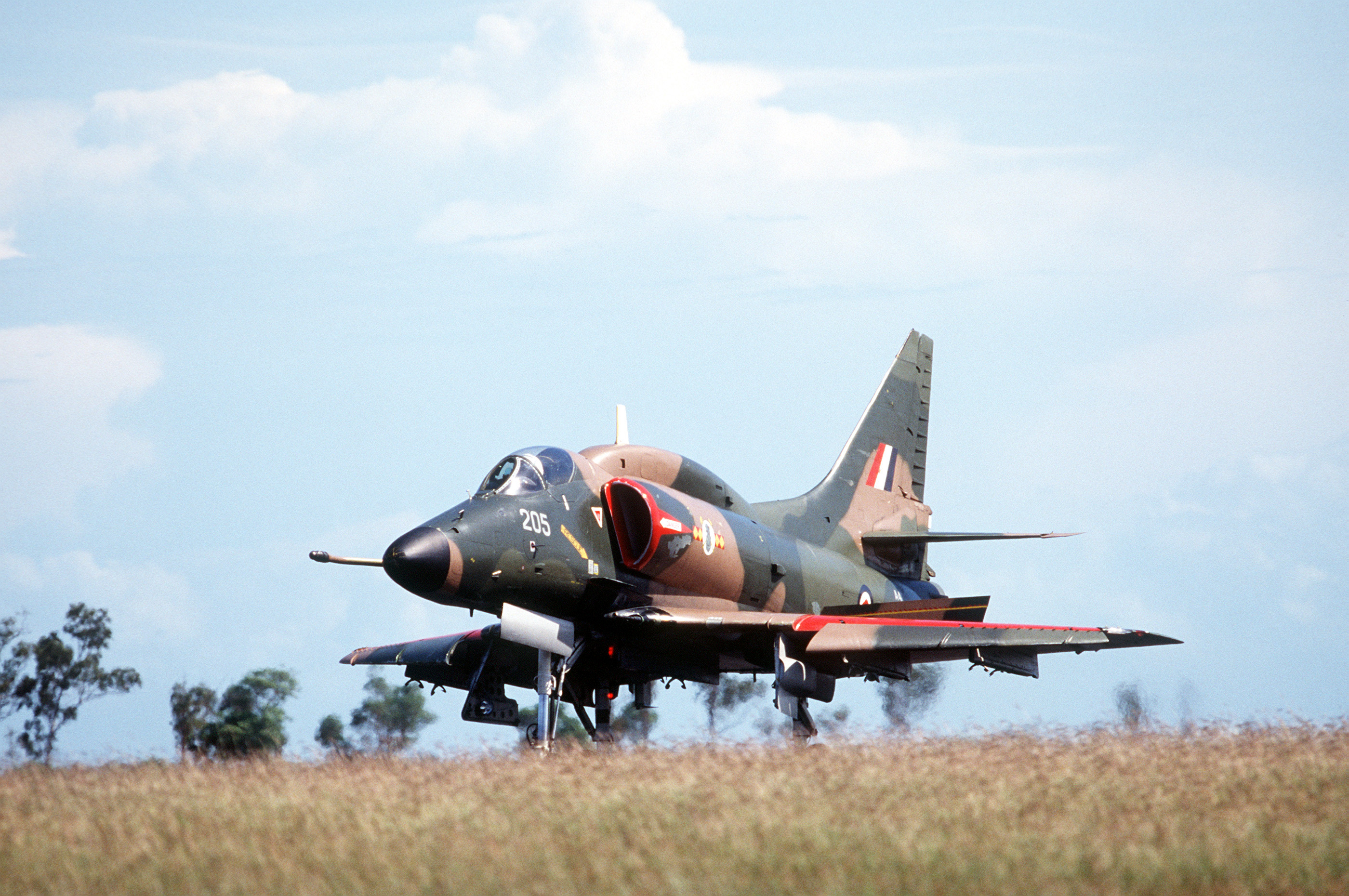
RNZAF A-4K

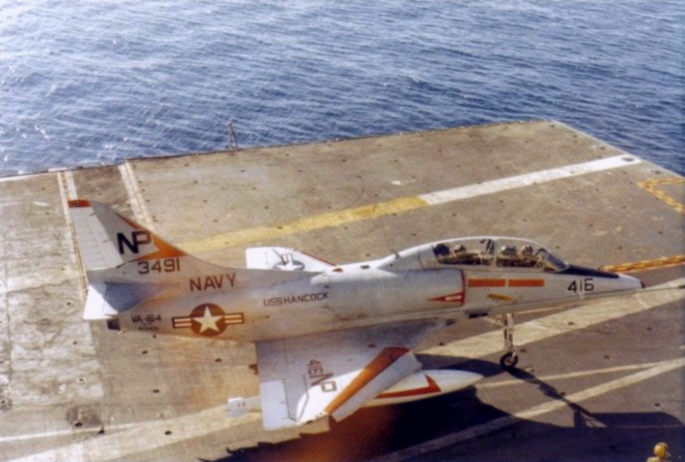
TA-4F Skyhawk of VA-164 aboard the aircraft carrier USS Hancock in the early 1970s

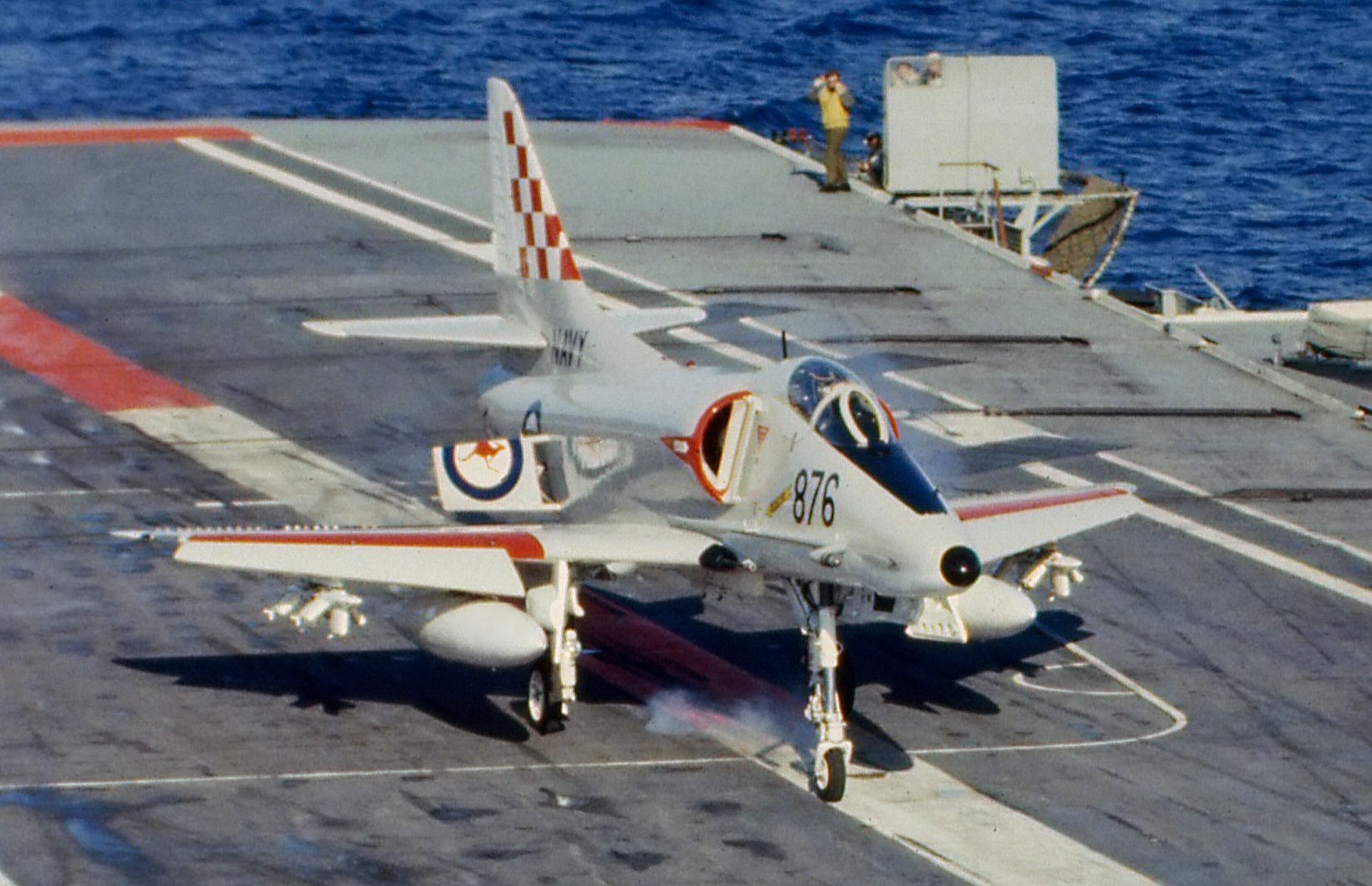
A-4G of VF-805 takes a wire aboard HMAS Melbourne in 1980

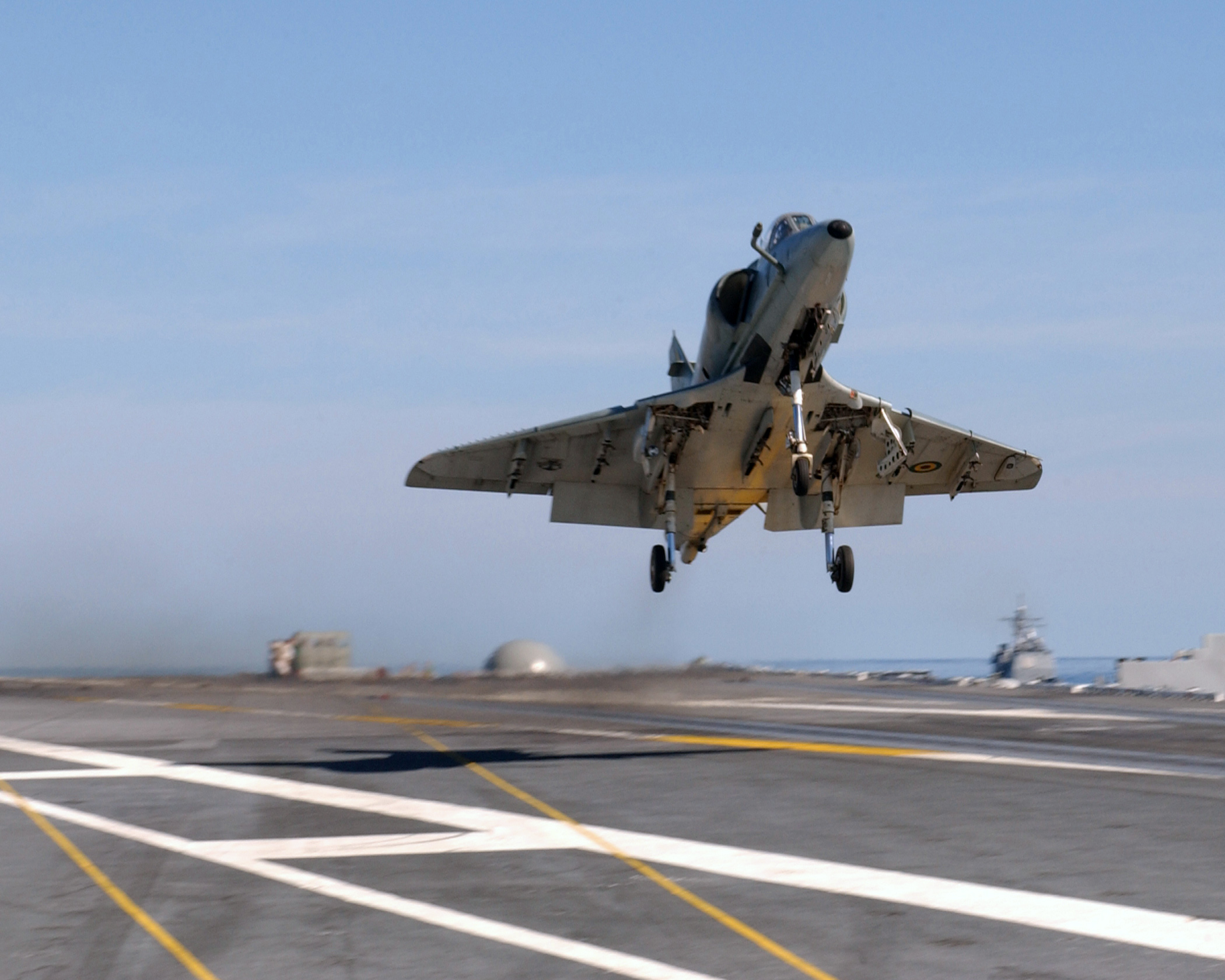
Brazilian Navy AF-1 (A-4KU)

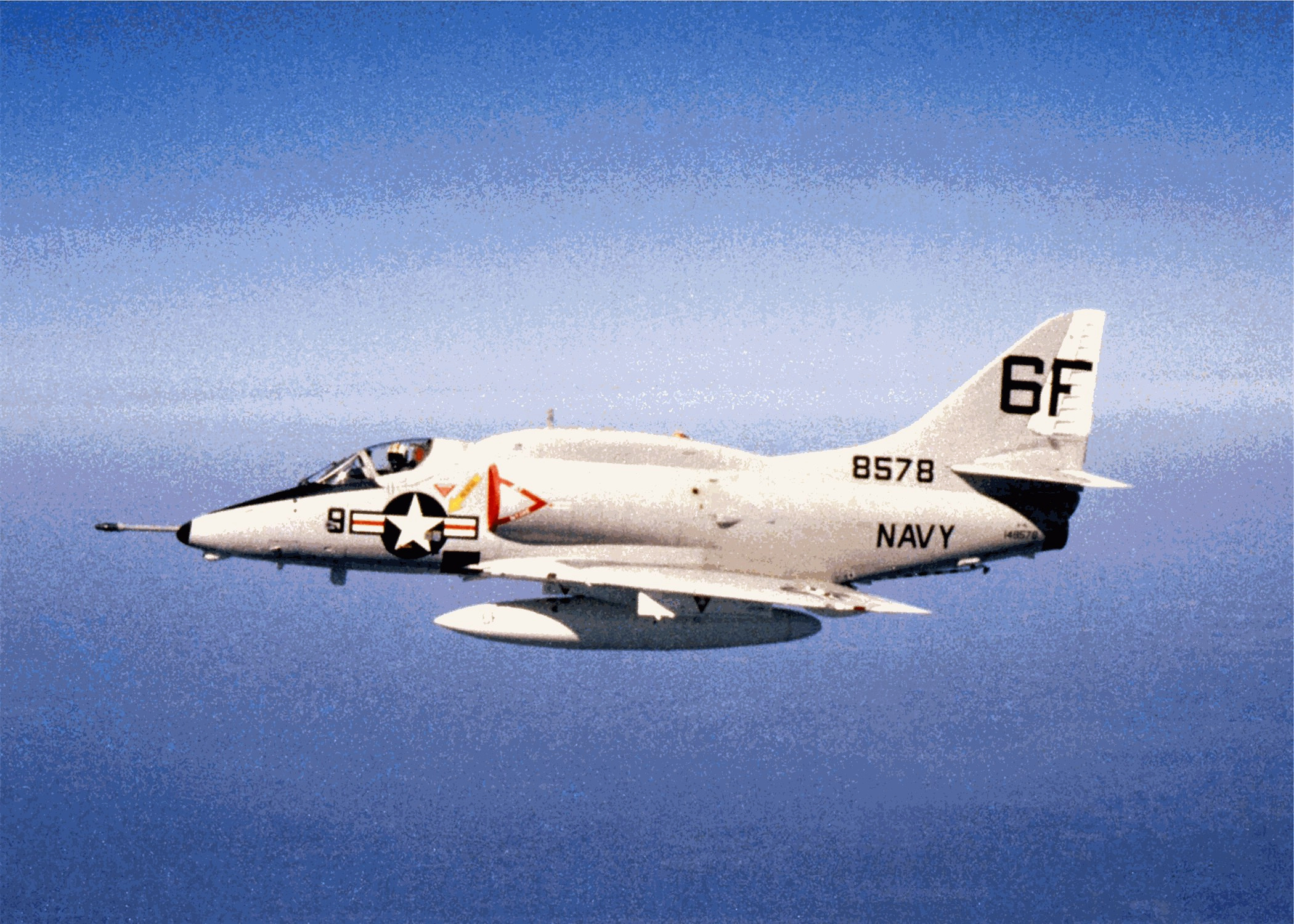
Naval Reserve A-4L of VA-203

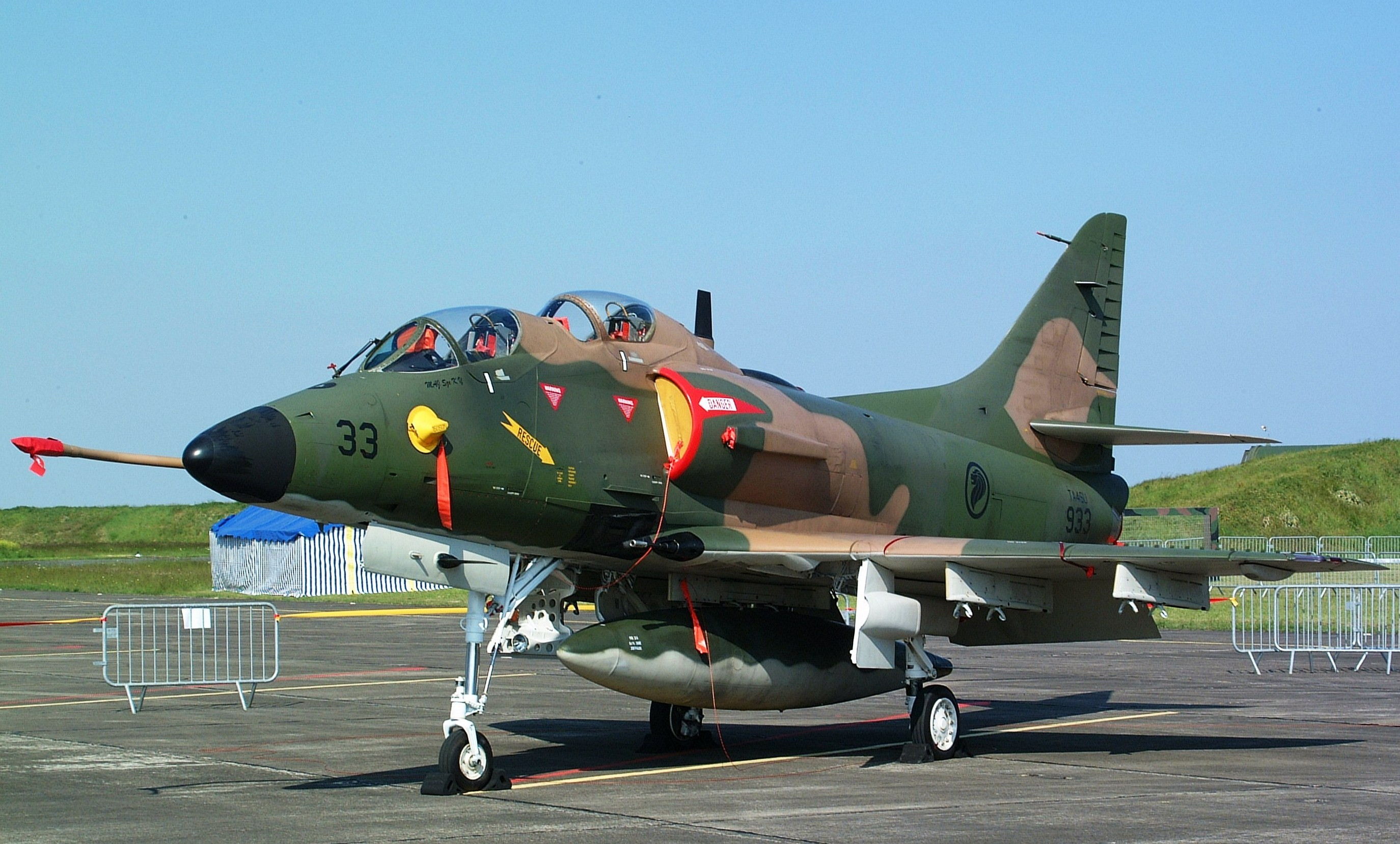
Dual cockpits of the TA-4SU Skyhawk

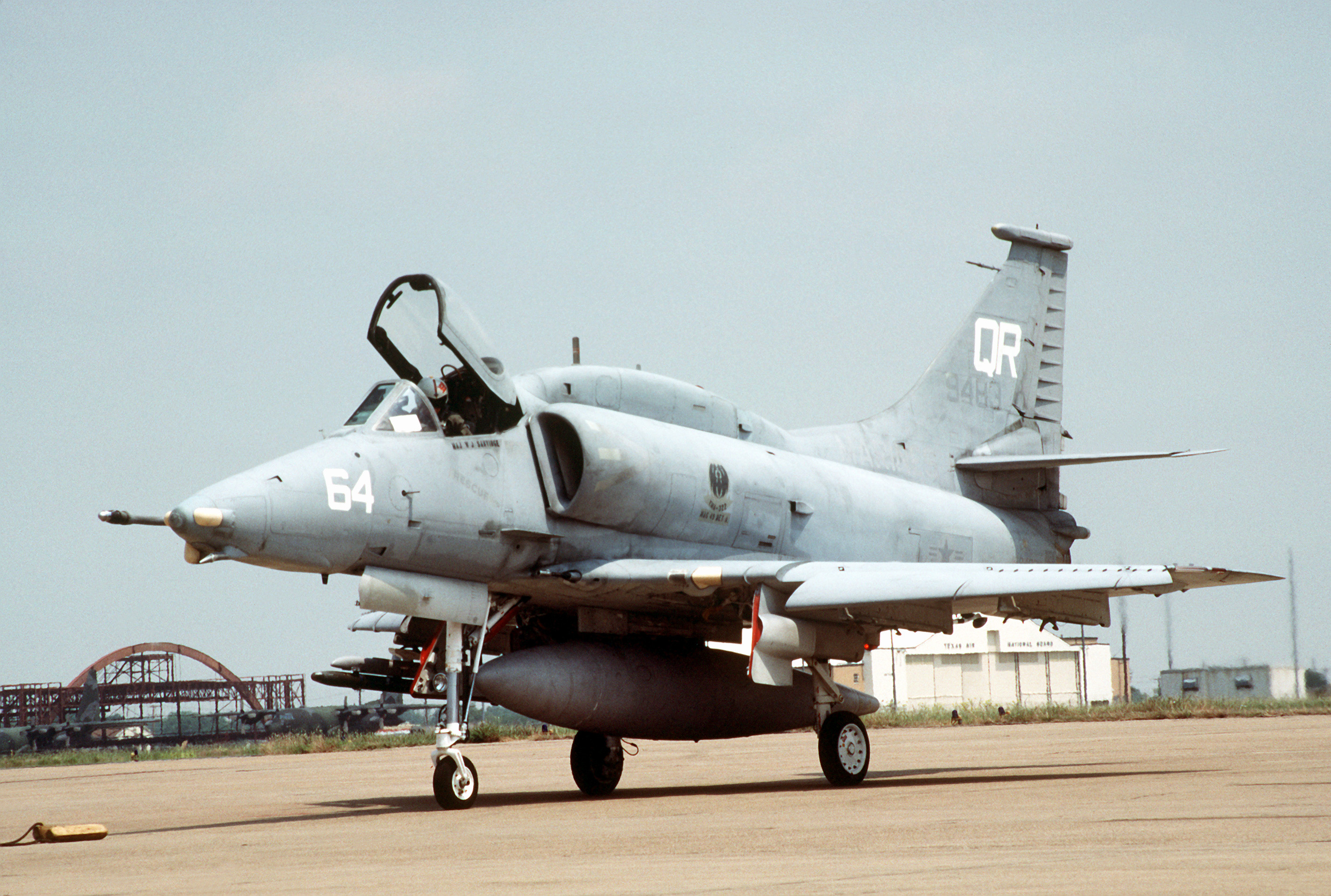
A-4M of VMA-322

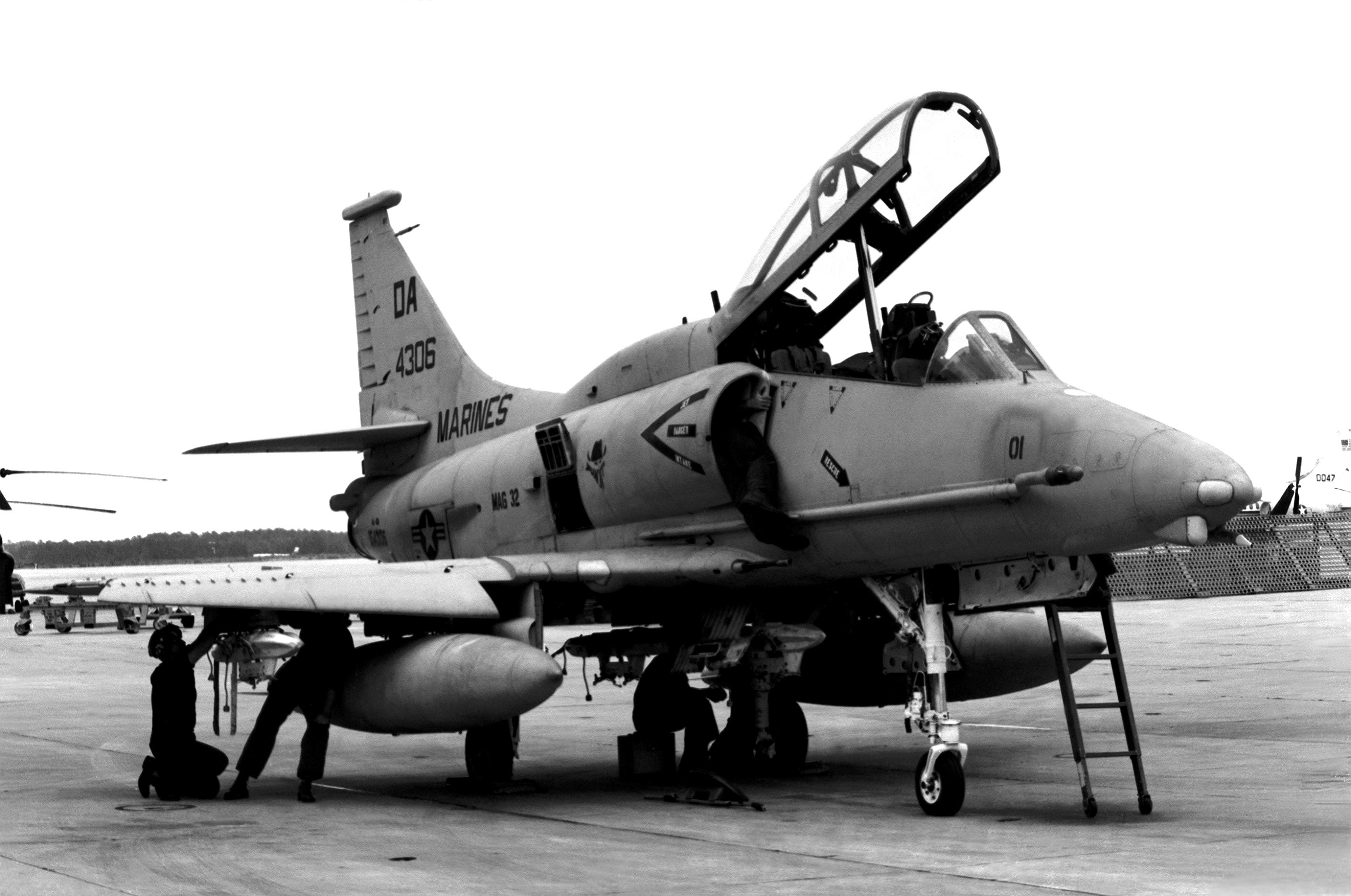
OA-4M of MAG-32 in 1990

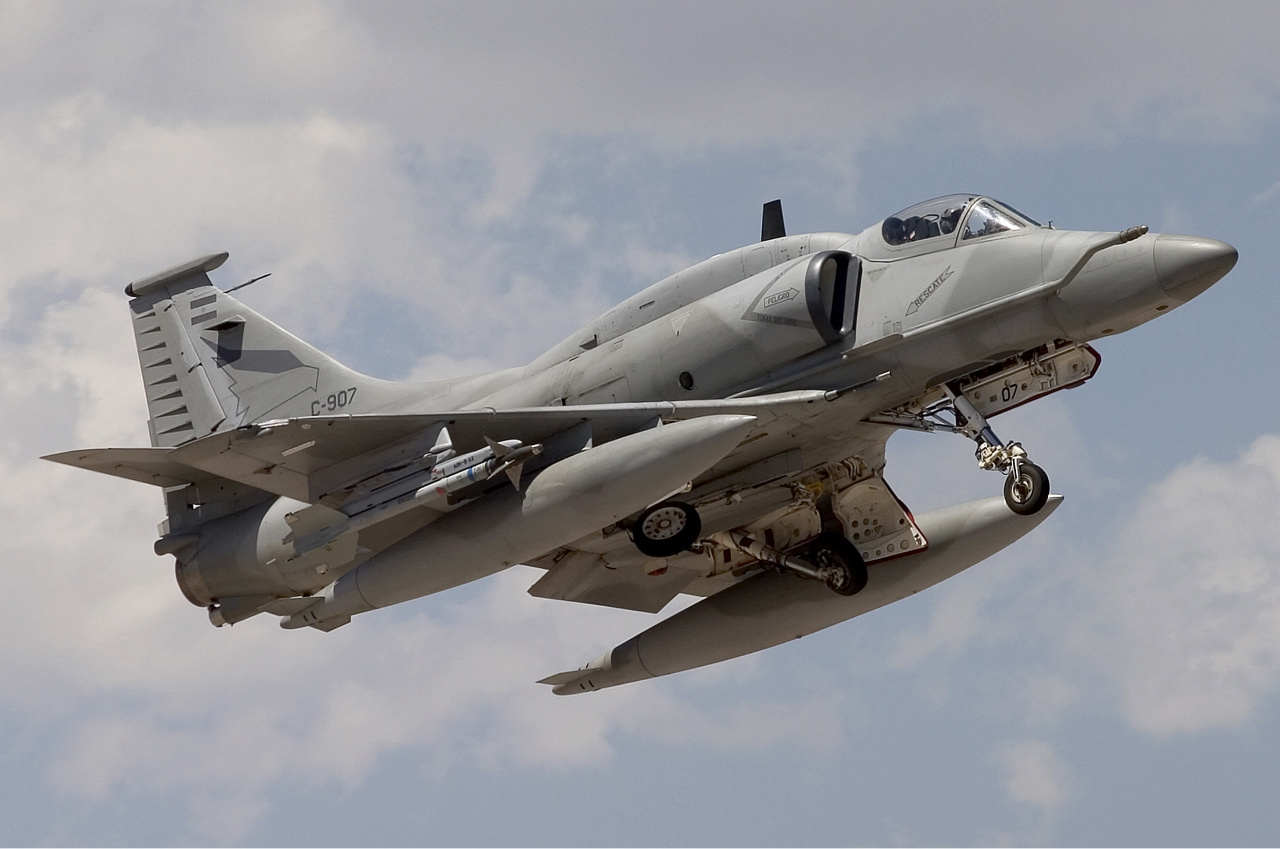
Argentine Air Force A-4AR Fightinghawk

=== Original production variants ===
XA4D-1
Initial prototype, one built.
YA4D-1
Flight test prototypes and pre-production aircraft; redesignated YA-4A in 1962, then A-4A, 19 built.
A4D-1 (A-4A)
Initial production version; redesignated A-4A in 1962, 166 built.
A4D-2 (A-4B)
Strengthened aircraft and added air-to-air refueling capabilities, improved navigation and flight control systems, provision for AGM-12 Bullpup missile; redesignated A-4B in 1962, 542 built.
A4D-2N (A-4C)
Night/adverse weather version of A4D-2, with AN/APG-53A radar, autopilot, LABS low-altitude bombing system. Wright J65-W-20 engine with 8,200 lbf (36 kN) of takeoff thrust; redesignated A-4C in 1962, 638 built.
A4D-3
Proposed advanced avionics version, none built.
A4D-4
Proposed long-range version with new wings; none built.
A4D-5 (A-4E)
Major upgrade, including new Pratt & Whitney J52-P-6A engine with 8,500 lbf (38 kN) of thrust, strengthened airframe with two more weapon pylons (for a total of five), improved avionics, with TACAN, Doppler navigation radar, radar altimeter, toss-bombing computer, and AJB-3A low-altitude bombing system. Many later upgraded with J52-P-8 engine with 9,300 lbf (41 kN) thrust; redesignated A-4E in 1962, (Note: The designation A-4D was not used to avoid confusion with the pre-1962 A4D designation.) 499 built.
A4D-6
Proposed enlarged version of the A4D-5, none built.
A-4F
Refinement of the A-4E with extra avionics housed in a hump on the fuselage spine (this feature later retrofitted to A-4Es and some A-4Cs), wing-top spoilers to reduce landing roll out, nose wheel steering, and a more powerful J52-P-8A engine with 9,300 lbf (41 kN) of thrust, later upgraded in service to the J52-P-408 with 11,200 lbf (50 kN), 147 built. Some served with the Blue Angels acrobatic team from 1973 to 1986.
A-4G
Eight aircraft built new for the Royal Australian Navy with minor variations from the A-4F; in particular, they were not fitted with the avionics hump. Subsequently, eight more A-4Fs were modified to this standard for the RAN. Significantly the A-4Gs were modified to carry four underwing Sidewinder AIM-9B missiles, increasing their Fleet Defense capability. Ten were sold in 1984 to the Royal New Zealand Air Force and later rebuilt under Project KAHU into A-4Ks.
A-4H
90 aircraft for the Israeli Air Force based on the A-4F. Used 30 mm (1.18 in) DEFA cannon with 150 rpg in place of U.S. 20 mm (.79 in) guns. Some A-4Es were later locally modified to this standard, and subsequently, modified with extended jetpipes to reduce their heat signature.
A-4K
10 aircraft for the Royal New Zealand Air Force. In the 1990s, these were upgraded under Project KAHU with new radar and avionics, provision for AGM-65 Maverick, AIM-9 Sidewinder, and GBU-16 Paveway II laser-guided bomb. The RNZAF also rebuilt a further A-4C and 10 A-4Gs to A-4K standard.
A-4M Skyhawk II
Dedicated Marine version with improved avionics and more powerful J52-P-408 engine with 11,200 lbf (50 kN) thrust, enlarged cockpit, IFF system. Later fitted with Hughes AN/ASB-19 Angle Rate Bombing System (ARBS) with TV and laser spot tracker, 158 built.
A-4N
117 modified A-4Ms for the Israeli Air Force.
TA-4F
Conversion trainer – standard A-4F with extra seat for an instructor, 241 built.
TA-4G
two trainer versions of the A-4G built new, and two more modified from TA-4Fs.
TA-4H
25 trainer versions of the A-4H for Israel. Upgraded with more modern avionics.
TA-4J
Dedicated trainer version based on A-4F, but lacking combat capability and with down-rated engine, 277 built new, and most TA-4Fs were later converted to this configuration.
TA-4K
Four trainer versions of the TA-4J. A fifth example only for static display was later assembled in New Zealand from spare parts.

=== Upgraded, modified and export variants ===
TA-4E
Two A-4Es modified as prototypes of a trainer version.
EA-4F
Four TA-4Fs converted for ECM training.
A-4L
100 A-4Cs remanufactured for Marine Corps Reserves and Navy Reserve squadrons. Fitted with A-4F avionics (including the fuselage hump) but retaining J-65 engine and three-pylon wing.
OA-4M
23 TA-4Fs modified for Forward Air Control duties.
A-4P
Remanufactured A-4Bs sold to Argentine Air Force, known as A-4B by the Argentines.
A-4Q
Remanufactured A-4Bs sold to Argentine Navy.
A-4Y
Provisional designation for A-4Ms modified with the ARBS. Designation never adopted by the U.S. Navy or U.S. Marine Corps.
A-4AR Fightinghawk
36 A-4Ms refurbished for Argentina.
OA-4AR Fightinghawk
Refurbished two-seat training version for Argentina.
CA-4F
A proposed two seat variant for the Royal Canadian Navy based on the A-4E with a dorsal conformal fuel tank instead of an avionics hump, it was to have replaced the F2H-3 Banshee on HMCS Bonaventure. Canada expressed little interest and so it was never placed in production.
A-4KU
30 modified A-4Ms for the Kuwaiti Air Force. Brazil purchased 20 of these second-hand and redesignated them AF-1. Now used by the Brazilian Navy on carrier duty.
TA-4KU
Three trainer versions of the above. Brazil purchased some of these second-hand and redesignated them AF-1A.
A-4PTM
40 A-4Cs and A-4Ls refurbished for Royal Malaysian Air Force, incorporating many A-4M features (PTM stands for Peculiar to Malaysia).
TA-4PTM
Unique trainer version for Royal Malaysian Air Force. Converted from A-4C/L airframes with 28" fuselage plug and second cockpit, similar to TA-4F/J (PTM stands for Peculiar to Malaysia).
A-4S
50 A-4Bs remanufactured for Republic of Singapore Air Force.
TA-4S
Seven trainer versions of the above. Different from most TA-4 trainers with a common cockpit for the student and instructor pilot, these were essentially rebuilt with a 28 in (710 mm) fuselage plug inserted into the front fuselage and a separate bulged cockpit (giving better all-round visibility) for the instructor seated behind the student pilot.
A-4S-1
50 A-4Cs remanufactured for the Republic of Singapore Air Force.
TA-4S-1
Eight trainer versions of the above. These were designated as TA-4S-1 to set it apart from the earlier batch of seven airframes.
A-4SU Super Skyhawk
Extensively modified and updated version of the A-4S-1, exclusively for the Republic of Singapore Air Force, fitted with a General Electric F404 non-afterburning turbofan engine, and modernized electronics.
TA-4SU Super Skyhawk
Extensively modified and updated version of the TA-4S & TA-4S-1 to TA-4SU standard.
AF-1/1A
Brazilian Navy designation applied to 23 A-4KU and TA-4KU aircraft acquired from the Kuwaiti Air Force.
AF-1B/C
Brazilian Navy upgraded version of AF-1/1A by Embraer and AEL Sistemas. Changes from analog to digital avionics, new radar systems, improved communications equipment and weapons.

A-4N-AAF

Former Israeli A-4Ns modified for aggressor training by Canadian Defence contractor Top Aces. The Advanced Aggressor Mission System upgrade includes AESA radar, IRST, HMCS, Tactical Datalink, and EW capabilities.

== Operators ==
=== Current ===
Brazil

- Brazilian Navy – 4 modernized AF-1B (A-4KU) in operation and 3 AF-1C (TA-4KU) for training

=== Former ===
Argentina

- Argentine Air Force − A-4AR Fightinghawk, retired on 14 May 2026, replaced by the F-16 Fighting Falcon.
- Argentine Navy

Australia

- Royal Australian Navy – retired in 1984 and sold to RNZAF

Indonesia

- Indonesian Air Force (TNI-AU) – retired in 2004

Israel

- Israeli Air Force – retired from frontline duty in 2008, retired from training flights in December 2015.

Kuwait

- Kuwait Air Force – retired around 1998 and sold to Brazilian Navy

Malaysia

- Royal Malaysian Air Force – retired from service by 1999.

New Zealand

- Royal New Zealand Air Force – retired in 2001

Singapore

- Republic of Singapore Air Force retired from frontline service in 2005, and were transferred to France (Cazaux Air Base) as advanced jet trainers. The Skyhawks were retired from training flights from 2013 and replaced by the Alenia Aermacchi M-346. 1 RSAF A-4SU was donated to the Institute of Technical Education (ITE College Central) for vocational and training purposes.

United States

- United States Navy
- United States Marine Corps

=== Private operators ===
Canada

- Top Aces Inc. − Owns and operates 21 A-4N-AAF and one TA-4J for use as trainer and aggressor aircraft.

United States

- Draken International – based at Lakeland Linder International Airport, owns and operates 7 former New Zealand A/TA-4Ks and 6 former Israeli A-4Ns.
- AeroGroup − a private American commercial company operating previously owned A-4 aircraft.
- Legionnaire International Ltd Co − Owns seven and currently operates four A-4L (A4D-2N) and one TA-4J Skyhawks based at KGYI North Texas Regional Airport/Perrin Field in Denison Texas. The aircraft are used extensively for RDT&E of weapon systems, as well as radar and electronic warfare development and test.

== Aircraft on display ==
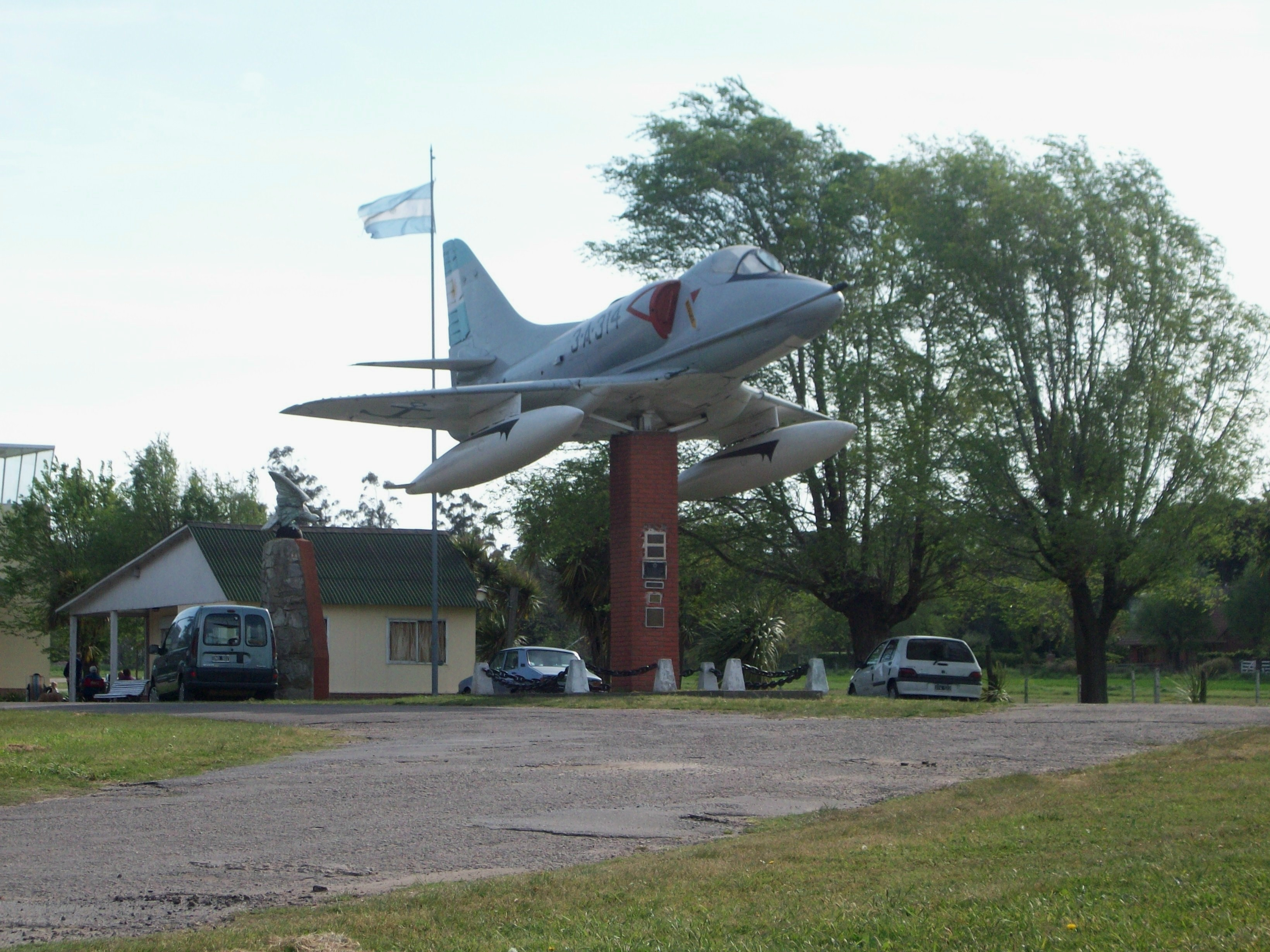
Argentine Navy A-4Q as a gate guardian at Mar del Plata

Given the number of air forces that operated the Skyhawk, a significant number have been preserved, either airworthy or on display. Preserved A-4s can be found in Argentina, Australia, Brazil, France, Israel, Japan, Netherlands, New Zealand, Singapore, United States, and others.

== Specifications (A4D-5 / A-4E Skyhawk) ==
Douglas A-4 Skyhawk 3-view drawing

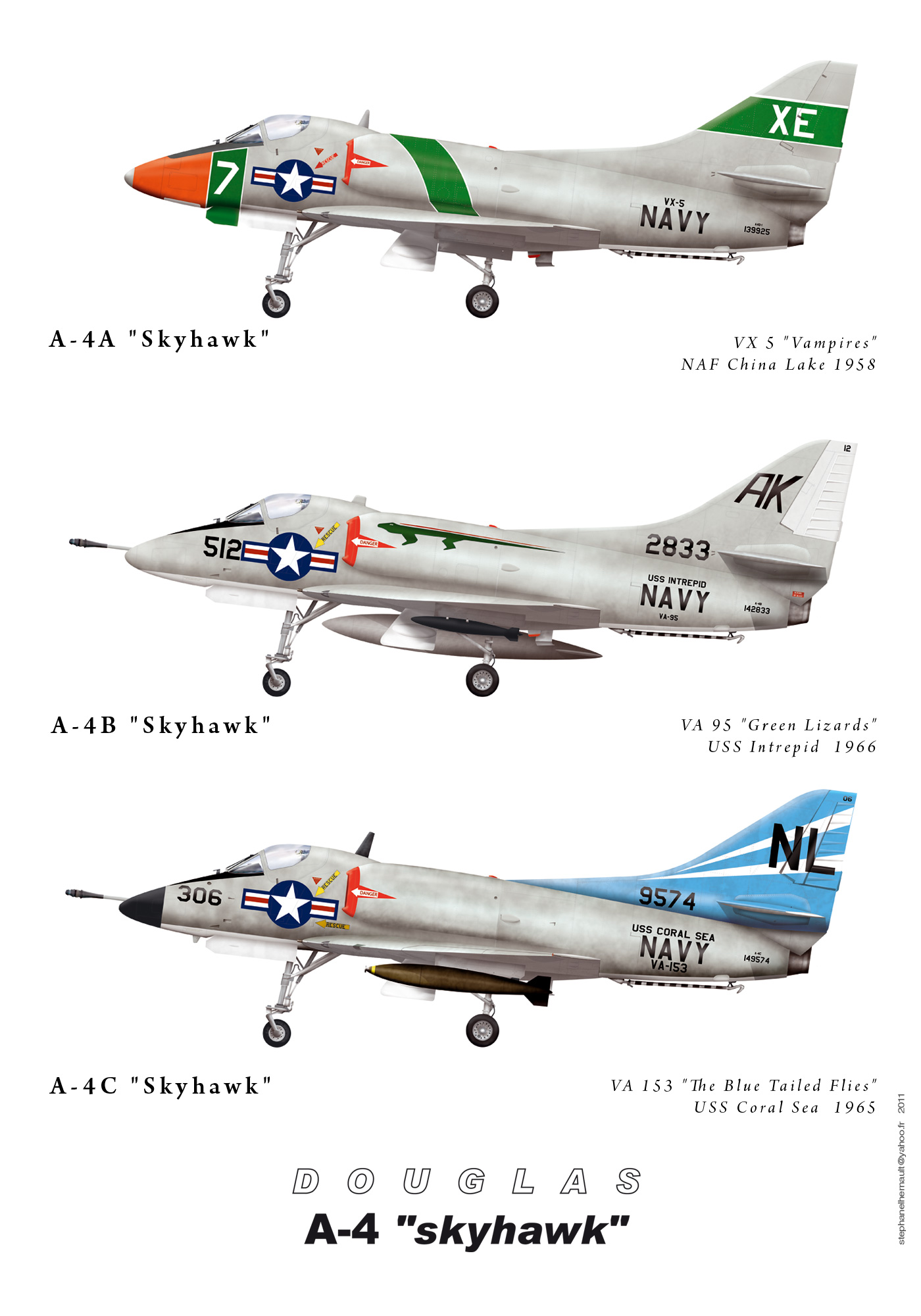
A-4 Skyhawk A/B/C color scheme

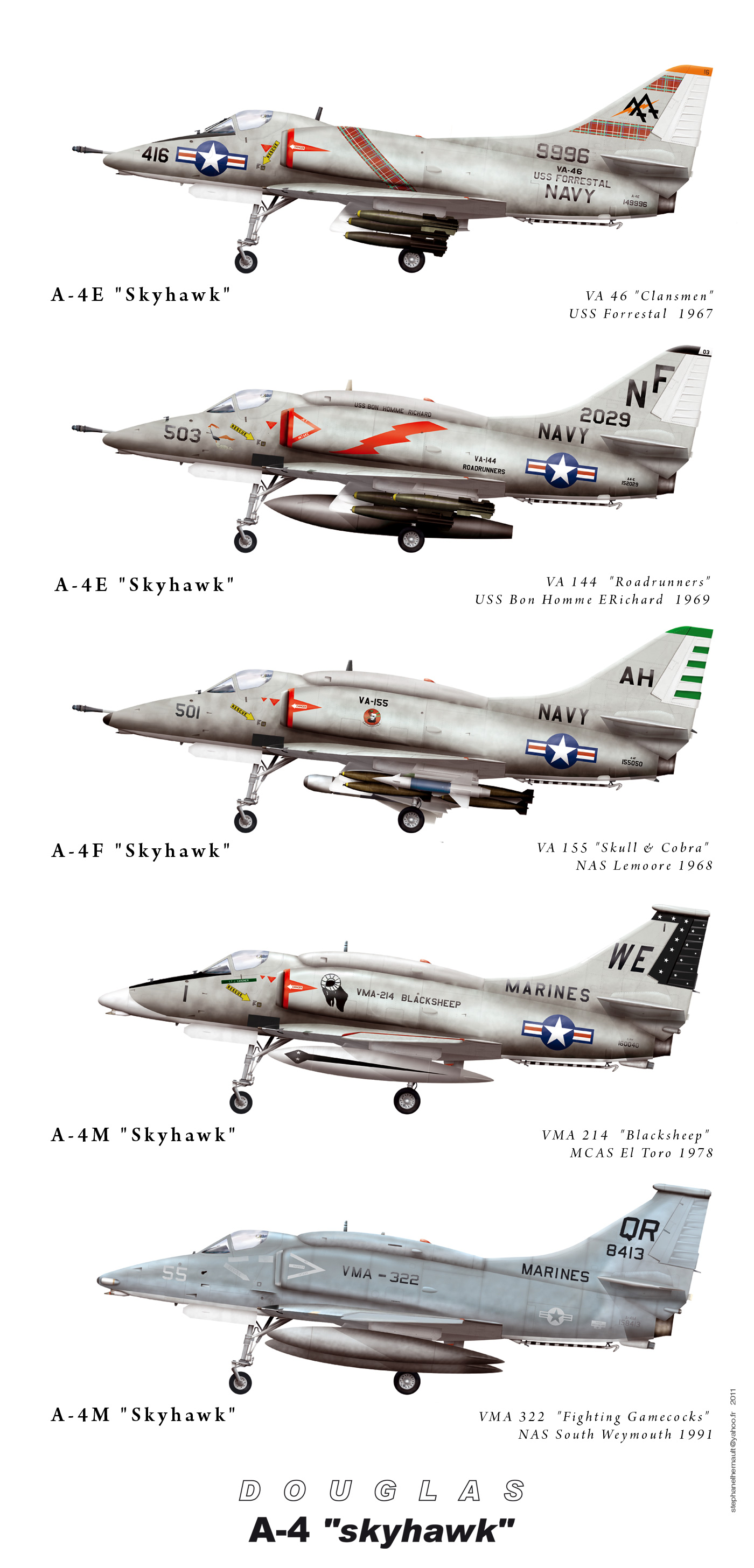
A-4 Skyhawk E/F/M color scheme

Data from McDonnell Douglas aircraft since 1920 : Volume I, Global Security : A4D (A-4) Skyhawk

General characteristics

- Crew: 1
- Length: 40 ft 1.5 in (12.230 m)
- Wingspan: 27 ft 6 in (8.38 m)
- Height: 15 ft 2 in (4.62 m)
- Wing area: 260 sq ft (24 m^{2})
- Airfoil: root: NACA 0008-1.1-25; tip: NACA 0005-.825-50
- Empty weight: 9,853 lb (4,469 kg)
- Gross weight: 16,216 lb (7,355 kg)
- Max takeoff weight: 24,500 lb (11,113 kg)
- Powerplant: 1 × Pratt & Whitney J52-P-6A turbojet engine, 8,500 lbf (38 kN) thrust

Performance

- Maximum speed: 585 kn (673 mph, 1,083 km/h) at sea level
- Range: 1,008 nmi (1,160 mi, 1,867 km)
- Ferry range: 2,194 nmi (2,525 mi, 4,063 km)
- g limits: +8 -3
- Rate of climb: 5,750 ft/min (29.2 m/s)
- Wing loading: 62.4 lb/sq ft (305 kg/m^{2})
- Thrust/weight: 0.526 (at gross weight)

Armament

- Guns: 2× 20 mm (0.79 in) Colt Mk 12 cannon, 100 rounds/gun
- Hardpoints: 4× under-wing & 1× under-fuselage pylon stations with a capacity of 8,500 lb (3,900 kg), with provisions to carry combinations of:
  - Rockets: 4× LAU-10 rocket pods (each with 4× 127 mm Mk 32 Zuni rockets)
  - Bombs:
    - 6× Rockeye-II Mark 20 Cluster Bomb Unit (CBU)
    - 6× Rockeye Mark 7/APAM-59 CBU
    - Mark 80 series of unguided bombs (including 3 kg and 14 kg practice bombs)
    - B43 nuclear bomb
    - B57 nuclear bomb
    - B61 nuclear bomb
  - Other: up to 3× 370 US gallons (1,400 L) Sargent Fletcher drop tanks for ferry flight/extended range/loitering time
- Missiles:
  - Air-to-air missiles:
    - 4× AIM-9 Sidewinder
  - Air-to-surface missiles:
    - 2× AGM-12 Bullpup
    - 2× AGM-45 Shrike anti-radiation missile
    - 2× AGM-62 Walleye TV-guided glide bomb
    - 2× AGM-65 Maverick

Avionics
Typical avionics fitted to A-4s

- Bendix AN/APN-141 Low altitude radar altimeter (refitted to C and E, standard in the F)
- Stewart-Warner AN/APQ-145 Mapping & Ranging radar (mounted on A-4F, also found on A-4E/N/S/SU)

== See also ==
Related development

- Lockheed Martin A-4AR Fightinghawk
- McDonnell Douglas A-4G Skyhawk
- ST Aerospace A-4SU Super Skyhawk

Aircraft of comparable role, configuration, and era

- Dassault Étendard IV
- Dassault Super Mystère
- Fiat G.91
- Hawker Hunter
- PZL-Mielec Lim-6
- Saab 32 Lansen

Related lists

- List of attack aircraft
- List of military aircraft of the United States
- List of military electronics of the United States
