= List of equipment of the Argentine Air Force =

Below is listed the equipment that the Argentine Air Force use.

== Munitions ==
Model	Type	Origin	Description
MK-76 Mod.5	Training bomb	United States	
MK-106	Training bomb	United States	
BK-BR	Unguided bomb	Spain	
BRP	Unguided bomb	Spain	
FAS	Unguided bomb	Argentina	
MK 82	Unguided bomb	United States	
GBU-12 Paveway II	guided bomb	United States	Will be used by F-16.
M117	Unguided bomb	United States	
Mk-17	Unguided bomb	UK	Used by A-4.
AN-M65	General-purpose bomb	United States	
SITEA INC	Incendiary bomb	Argentina	Incendiary bomb used by IA-58.
Folding-Fin Aerial Rocket	Rocket	United States	
Aspide	Rocket	Argentina	
AIM-9 Sidewinder	Air-to-air missile	United States	AIM-9L and AIM-9M variants in use by A-4.
CITEFA AS-25K	Air-to-surface missile	Argentina	
AIM-120 AMRAAM	Air-to-air missile	United States	AIM 120-C8 variant that will be used by F-16.

== Aircraft guns ==
Model	Type	Origin	Description
DEFA	Revolver cannon	Bangladesh	DEFA-554 variant in use by IA-63.
Hispano-Suiza HS.804	Revolver cannon	Spain	Used by IA-58.
Colt Mk 12	Autocannon	United States	Used by A-4.
M61A1 Vulcan	Gatling gun	United States	Used by F-16.
FN Browning 7.62mm	Machine gun	Belgium	Used by IA-58.
ARM-657 Mamboretá	Rocket platform	Argentina	Aspide rocket platform.
LAU-61/A	Rocket platform	United States	FFAR rocket platform used by IA-58 and A-4.
LAU-10/A	Rocket platform	United States	FFAR rocket platform used by A-4.
LAU-131	Rocket platform	United States	FFAR rocket platform used by H-500 Avispa.

== Firearms ==
Model	Type	Origin	Caliber	Description
Browning Hi-Power	Semi-automatic pistol	Belgium	9mm	Standard service pistol. Manufactured by DGFM, variants FM-95 and FM-02AR in use.
FMK-3	Machine pistol	Argentina	9mm	
Heckler & Koch MP5	Submachine gun	Germany	9mm	Submachine gun endowment.
FN FAL	Battle rifle	Belgium	7.62mm	Standard service rifle. Manufactured by DGFM as FMAP FAL.
Heckler & Koch HK33	Assault rifle	Germany	5.56mm	Used by Special Operations Group.
Heckler & Koch G41	Assault rifle	United States	5.56mm	Used by Special Operations Group.
M24	Sniper rifle	United States	7.62mm	Sniper rifle endowment.
Heckler & Koch PSG1	Sniper rifle	Germany	7.62mm	Used by Special Operations Group.
FN MAG	Medium machine gun	Belgium	7.62mm	General-purpose machine gun of the force.
M2 Browning	Heavy machine gun	United States	12.7mm	Mounted on Fiat 6614 vehicle.

== Artillery ==
=== Anti-air artillery ===
Model	Type	Quantity	Origin	Caliber	Description
Roland II	Surface-to-air missile	3	France	-	Surface-to-air missile system.
Rheinmetall Rh 202	Autocannon	36	Germany	20mm	Short-range cannon. Used against low-altitude objectives and ground objectives.
Oerlikon 20 mm	Autocannon	40	Germany	20mm	Short-range cannon.
Oerlikon GDF	Autocannon	2	Switzerland	35mm	1 Skyguard fire control in service.
RBS 70 NG	Surface-to-air missile	Classified	Sweden	106mm	MANPADS

== Vehicles ==
Model	Type	Quantity	Origin	Description
Fiat 6614	Armored personnel carrier	25	Italy	Armoured vehicle to transport passengers, used on air brigades.
Humvee	Military light utility vehicle	70	United States	Light utility vehicle, for multipurpose roles.
Unimog	Military light utility vehicle	150	Germany	Utility truck. Used in Antarctica.
Toyota Land Cruiser	Off-road vehicle	44	Japan	Light vehicle used for transport.

== Radars ==
Model	Quantity	Origin	Description
AN/TPS-43	4	United States	Transportable 3D radar. 1 modified.
AN/FPS 113/90/42	2	United States	Fixed 3D radar. Donated by Spain.
RAME	1	Argentina	"Radar Alcance Medio Experimental" (Medium-range experimental radar), manufactured by INVAP, third phase of the radar installation project.
Radar Primario Argentino	2	Argentina	Long-range 3D radar, designed and manufactured by Fabricaciones Militares and INVAP.

== See also ==
- Armed Forces of the Argentine Republic
- List of aircraft of the Argentine Air Force
