= Yarara (disambiguation) =

Yarara or Yarará is the common name of the venomous pit viper species Bothrops jararaca endemic to southern Brazil, Paraguay, and northern Argentina. Also known as Yarará perezosa (Argentina), jararaca (Brazil)

Yarara may also refer to:

- Bothrops alternatus, a venomous pit viper species found in Brazil, Paraguay, Uruguay and Argentina; common names Yarará grande (Argentina), Urutu (Brazil).
- Bothrops ammodytoides, a venomous pit viper species endemic to Argentina; common name Yarará ñata.
- EDESA Yarará, a self-propelled rocket artillery system developed in Argentina in the 1970s by EDESA (Empresa de Desarrollos Especiales S.A.).
- Nostromo Yarará, an Argentinean unmanned aerial vehicle (UAV) developed by Nostromo Defensa.
- Yarará Parachute Knife, a specially made dagger issued to Argentine Army paratroopers.
