= PAM submachine gun =

Argentine submachine gun

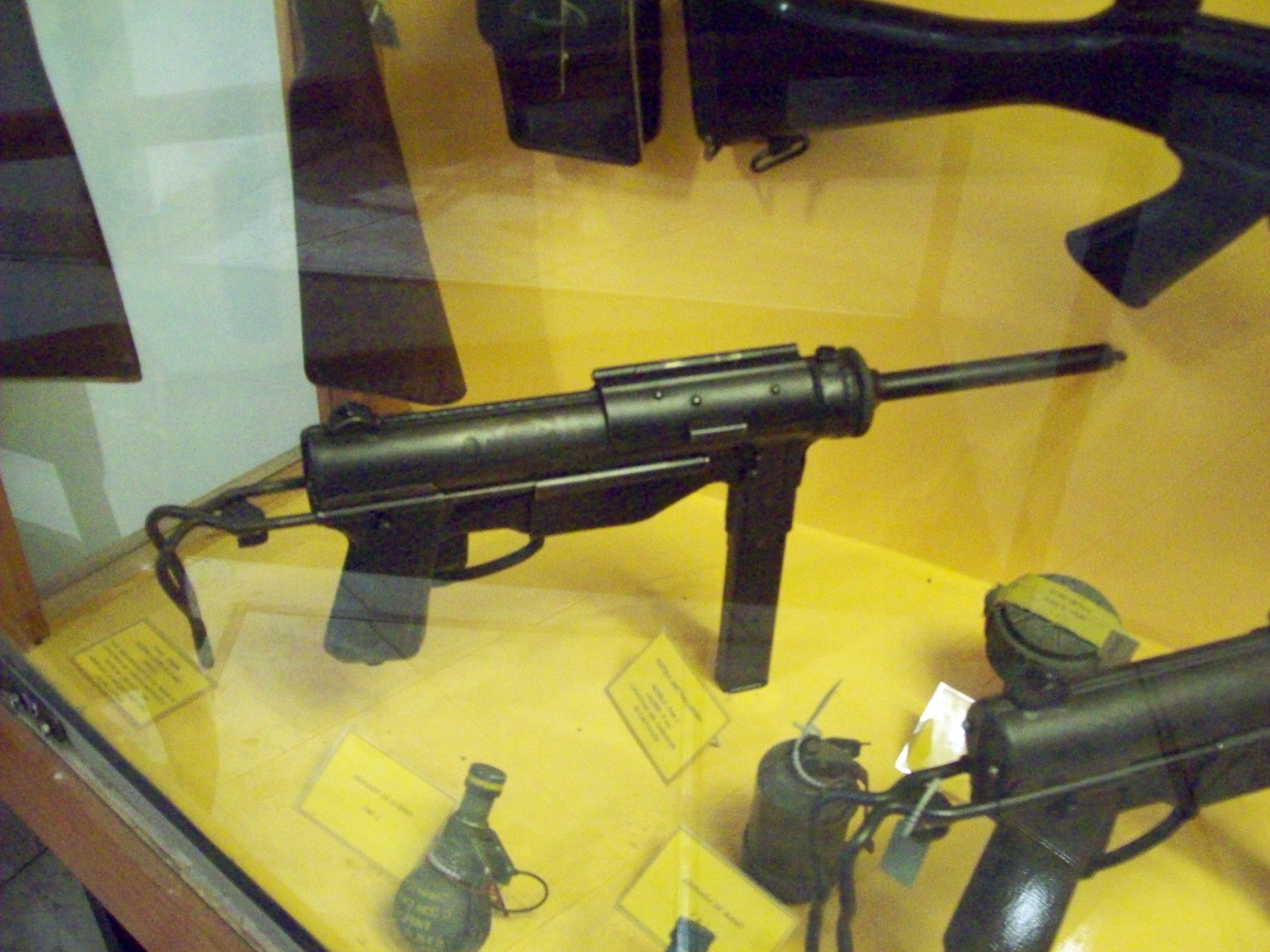
- A PAM-1 located at the Museo de Armas, Buenos Aires, Argentina.
- Type: Submachine gun
- Place of origin: Argentina

Service history
- In service: 1955-90s
- Wars: Falklands War

Production history
- Designed: 1954
- Manufacturer: Fábrica Militar de Armas Portátiles
- Developed from: M3 submachine gun
- Produced: 1955-1972
- No. built: 47,000

Specifications
- Mass: 7.27 pounds (3.30 kg)
- Length: 725 millimetres (28.5 in)
- Barrel length: 200 millimetres (7.9 in)
- Cartridge: 9×19mm
- Rate of fire: 450 rounds/min
- Feed system: Detachable double-feed box magazine
- Sights: Rear flip-type sight with 50m and 100m settings

The Pistola Ametralladora (English: "machine gun" or "machine pistol"), often referred to as the PAM submachine gun, was a series of two Argentine submachine guns (the PAM-1 and PAM-2) that were licensed variants of the American M3A1 'Grease Gun'. The main difference between the PAM series and the M3A1 was that the PAM was chambered in 9×19mm Parabellum instead of the M3's .45 ACP. The PAM-1 began production in 1955 and remained in service with the Argentine Armed Forces through the Falklands War and the 90s before being mostly removed from service and sold on the civilian market as a semi-automatic conversion. The PAM-2 was an improved version of the PAM-1 that mostly addressed the inadequate safety originating from the original M3.

== Design ==
Similar to the American M3 submachine gun, the PAM submachine gun was made entirely of stamped sheet metal. However, instead of the .45 ACP cartridge used in the M3, the PAM used the smaller 9×19mm Parabellum cartridge. This may have also been the reason that the PAM-1 was nearly a pound lighter than the M3. The other notable difference in the PAM was the replacement of the M3's fixed 100y rear sight for a flip-type sight that could be set to 50m or 100m.

== Development and production ==
=== PAM-1 ===
In October 1950, in Rosario, Argentina, members of the Argentine Army (EA) received a demonstration of the M3's capabilities. By 1954, they would acquire a license to produce a copy of the M3A1 at the Fábrica Militar de Armas Portátiles (FMAP) factory in Rosario. However, for unknown reasons this license didn't include instructions or production designs on how to produce the weapon. To get around this hurdle, they enlisted the help of an Italian gunsmith by the name of Eduardo Sustercic who had previously worked in a gun factory in Brescia, Italy. With his assistance they reverse-engineered available designs of the M3A1 to create production drawings for their own use. This first design would become known as the PAM-1.

=== PAM-2 ===
In 1961, engineers at FMAP created a design to fix the inadequate safety inherited from the M3A1. Both guns had no way to mechanically disable the trigger, and instead relied on a protrusion on the bottom of the dust cover to lock into place and prevent the gun's bolt from engaging. However, dropping the gun could potentially dent the dust cover and prevent the safety from engaging entirely, causing multiple fatalities and injuries during the M3's service in the U.S. Army. The solution implemented on the new PAM variant (the PAM-2) was retrofitting a lever in place behind the magazine that would prevent the dust cover from leaving the bolt unless the lever was depressed. Out of a sample of 34,636 units of the PAM-1, 16,544 would be converted to the PAM-2 by adding this lever. However, this upgrade came at a time when the production of the PAM was slowing down in favor of the newly adopted FMK-3 (and later the Belgian FN FAL), so only around 1100 new units of the PAM-2 would be produced.

During its period of production between 1955 and 1972, a total of 47,000 units of the PAM-1 and PAM-2 were produced.

== Users ==
- Argentina
