= Cañón 155 mm L 45 CALA 30 =

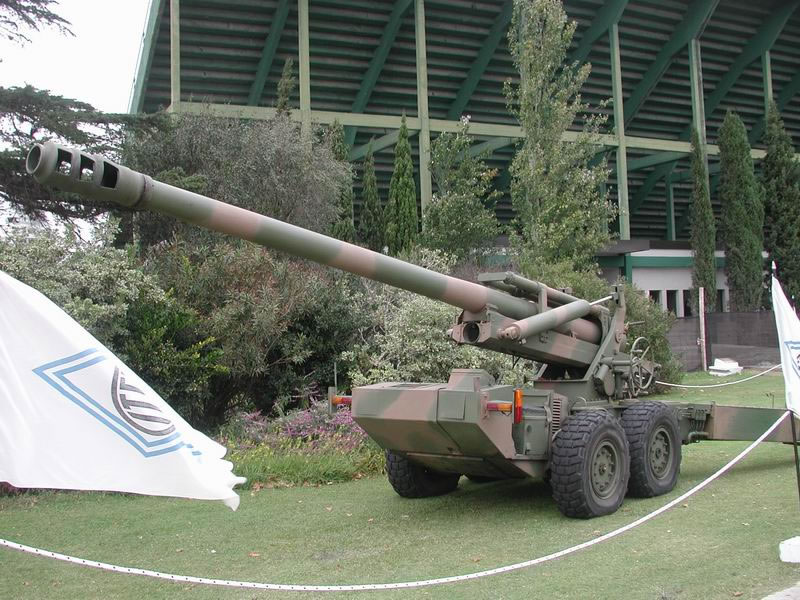
- Type: Field gun
- Place of origin: Argentina

Service history
- Used by: Argentine Army

Production history
- Designer: CITEFA
- Manufacturer: DGFM

Specifications
- Caliber: 155 mm (6.1 in)
- Breech: interrupted screw
- Carriage: Split trail
- Elevation: −3° to +67°
- Traverse: 30° (left and right)
- Effective firing range: 23 km (14 mi)
- Maximum firing range: 39 km (24 mi) (with special ammunition)

The 155 mm L45 CALA 30 Gun (Argentine Army denomination: Cañón 155 mm L 45 CALA 30) is an Argentinian long-range field artillery system developed for and in limited service with the Argentine Army.

== Development ==
Developed in late 1980s and early 1990s by CITEFA as Cañón de artillería de largo alcance calibre 155 milímetros L45 CALA 30 in order to supplement (and eventually replace) the CITER 155mm L33 Gun still in service in the Argentine Army.

The development incorporates lessons learned in the use of artillery from the Falklands War. Battlefield scenarios that motivated the L45 development were that British seaborne troops were unable to leave the beaches for an extended period of time. Argentine forward observers could not call in long range artillery since it the longest range guns, the 155mm L33, were too widely dispersed and out of range. Cluster munitions were developed for use on the L45 for this reason as well. CITEFA designed an improved version, known as CALA 30/2, which incorporated improvements from testing of the first prototype. This was tested in 1996, when a range of 39 km was claimed using special ammunition EFRB-BB (Extended Range Full Bore – Base Bleed).

== Service ==
It is believed that small numbers are in service with the Argentine Army.

== Users ==
- (Argentina) Argentine Army

== See also ==
- Cañón 155 mm L 33 Modelo Argentino
