= MARA (anti-tank weapon) =

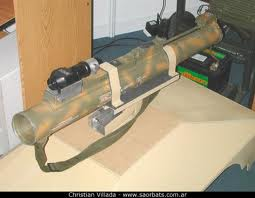
- MARA anti-tank rocket launcher
- Type: Anti-tank rocket launcher
- Place of origin: Argentina

Service history
- Used by: Argentina

Specifications
- Mass: 4.2 kg (9.3 lb)
- Length: 70 cm (unarmed); 100 cm (armed)
- Caliber: 78 mm
- Muzzle velocity: 170 m/s (560 ft/s)
- Effective firing range: 200m
- Maximum firing range: 350m
- Sights: front post and rear ladder sights

The MARA is a portable one-shot 78 mm unguided anti-tank weapon, designed and manufactured in Argentina by Fabricaciones Militares (DGFM). The solid rocket propulsion unit was developed by CITEFA.

== History ==
In the 1990s, the Argentine Army identified the need to replace obsolete short-range infantry anti-tank weapons in use, Such as the PDEF-40 rifle grenade, with a modern weapon similar to the AT4 locally developed and built,

The MARA Project was started by DGFM in the late 1990s, and in February 2005 the weapon was tested at the “Fábrica Militar Fray Luis Beltrán”.

The program formed part of a wider Argentine initiative to restore domestic defence production capabilities following increased reliance on foreign suppliers during the late Cold War and post Cold War period.

Development was carried out by DGFM in coordination with the Argentine army, incorporating feedback from infantry units during the testing phase.

CITEFA (later renamed CITEDEF) contributed to ballistic analysis, safety certification, and propulsion testing in addition to the development of the rocket motor.

The MARA was designed to be manufactured almost entirely using Argentine industrial capability, reducing dependence on imported components.

== Description ==
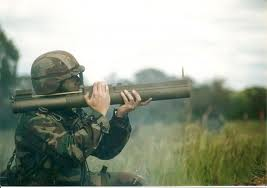
Argentine Army soldier firing a MARA

The MARA is a weapon of 78 mm caliber with a fiberglass launcher tube 70 cm in length when transported that is extended to 1 meter when ready to fire. The launcher weighs about 4.2 kg, can be reused up to five times when using training ammunition, and is disposable when firing live ammunition.

The anti-tank projectile is fin-stabilized, and is propelled by the rocker motor to a speed of about 170 meters per second. It is able to penetrate 300mm of steel armor, and the sighting system's accuracy allows to hit 1 m^{2} target at a distance of 200 meters.

The projectile uses a single-stage HEAT (High-Explosive Anti-Tank) warhead, with penetration figures typically referenced against rolled homogeneous armour (RHA).

In addition to anti-armour use, the weapon is capable of engaging light armoured vehicles, field fortifications, and hardened firing positions.

The launcher incorporates a rear backblast area comparable to similar disposable rocket systems, requiring clear space behind the operator when firing.

The MARA is intended primarily for short-range infantry use and is not designed to replace heavier crew-served or guided anti-tank systems in Argentine service.

== Specifications ==
The MARA looks like the M72 LAW but is slightly different in size. Its sling swivels are on the bottom, so the user doesn’t need to remove the sling before firing. It is usually painted sand, olive drab, or drylands camouflage with white markings.

For ammunition, a 73 mm rocket is used, similar to the 66 mm rocket in the M72 LAW. The rocket can penetrate 300 mm of armor, and once fired, has six folding fins that open immediately out of the barrel to keep it stable in flight. For training, an empty launcher can be reloaded up to five times.

The MARA is fitted with simple iron sights optimised for short-range engagements against stationary and slow-moving targets.

A dedicated inert training rocket is used for instruction and familiarisation, allowing repeated use of the launcher without expending live ammunition.

The system is operated by a single soldier and is intended for use in open terrain due to backblast restrictions.

Within Argentine Army doctrine, the MARA complements heavier infantry anti-tank weapons rather than serving as a primary anti-armour system.

== Service ==
The MARA entered limited service with the Argentine Army in the mid-2000s and has been primarily issued to infantry and light infantry units.

As of the 2010s, it remained in active service, though no confirmed combat use has been publicly documented.

== Users ==
- Argentine Army

== See also ==
- M72 LAW – (United States)
- M80 Zolja – (Socialist Federal Republic of Yugoslavia)
- RPG-18 / RPG-22 – (Soviet Union)
- RPG-76 Komar – (Polish People's Republic, Poland)
