= CITEFA MP-1000 Martin Pescador =

Argentine air-to-surface missile

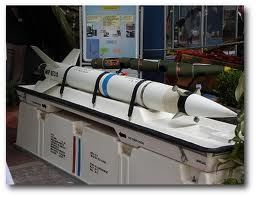
Martín Pescador

The Martín Pescador MP-1000 was an Argentine air-to-surface missile developed by the CITEFA (Instituto de Investigaciones Científicas y Técnicas de las FFAA - Armed Forces Scientific and Technical Research Institute). The main user was the COAN (Comando Aviación Naval - Naval Aviation Command) of the Argentine Navy.

== Development ==
The first evaluations were carried out in 1975. Around sixty test missiles were fired in the span of two years. The Argentine Air Force withdrew from the project - claiming that it was not there to "sink ships" - and the Navy slowed it down, although there are photos that show that at least a dozen were deployed in the 1978 Beagle Conflict, mostly to be employed by the Navy's the Aermacchi MB-326. However, they were not used in the Falklands War, citing, among other things, the nature of British anti-aircraft defences. The missile was finally certified after firing from T-28 Trojan aircraft, and the first related shot was fired by Captain Rodolfo Castro Fox of the COAN.

The missile is guided remotely by the pilot; after visually identifying their target, the pilot must radio control the missile during its flight. To assist the pilot in viewing the missile, it has two coloured flares on its rear. The pilot must control the missile visually and compensate for any drift that may be made until it reaches its target. This guidance system is similar to the American AGM-12 Bullpup missile.

Though significant training is required to operate the missile and the aircraft at the same time, the guidance system itself is technically simple and can be integrated with a wide variety of aircraft. The weapon has been successfully used from the T-28 Trojans and Aermacchi MB-326s of the Argentine Navy, and from the FMA IA 58 Pucará of the Argentine Air Force. It can also be used from helicopters, for which a wire-guided was developed.

The system was withdrawn in the 1990s, and the remaining missiles were donated to CITEFA to contribute to the development of the improved CITEFA AS-25K.

== Technical specifications ==
- Type: Anti-ship missile
- Manufacturer: CITEFA
- Diameter: 22 cm (2 ft 5 in)
- Length: 295 cm (86 in)
- Wingspan: 73 cm (2 ft 5 in)
- Total weight: 140 kg (308 lb)
- Standard warhead weight/mass: 40 kg (88 lb)
- Warhead type: HE
- Maximum range: 19 km (12 mi)
- Guidance: radio command

== See also ==
- CITEFA Mathogo anti-tank missile
- CITEFA AS-25K air-to-surface missile
- List of anti-ship missiles
