= Pampero (multiple rocket launcher) =

SLAM Pampero
- Type: Rocket artillery – Multiple rocket launcher
- Place of origin: Argentina

Service history
- In service: since 1980s
- Used by: Argentine Army

Production history
- Designer: CITEFA
- Manufacturer: DGFM

Specifications
- Caliber: 105 mm
- Rate of fire: 16 rockets in 7.5 secs
- Maximum firing range: 10,200 metres (6.3 mi)
- Feed system: manual

The SLAM (Sistema Lanzacohetes de Artillería Múltiple, or Multiple Rocket Launcher System) "Pampero" is an Argentinian multiple rocket launcher (a type of rocket artillery) from the Cold War and modern eras.

== Development ==
The SLAM "Pampero" MRL was developed by CITEFA in 1980–1983, and was subsequently manufactured during the early 1980s, by the DGFM “Fabrica Militar Fray Luis Beltran” in Rosario, Argentina. It is composed by a 16-tube launcher mounted on an Unimog 416 4x4 truck. The ammunition consists of 105mm "Pampero" artillery rockets, also developed by CITEFA, which can be armed with a variety of warheads. A total of five "Pampero" launchers on UNIMOG 416 chassis were built for the Argentine Army in 1983 (one of them the prototype and the others four for actual use).

== Service history ==
The self-propelled variant is currently in service with the Argentine Army artillery branch.

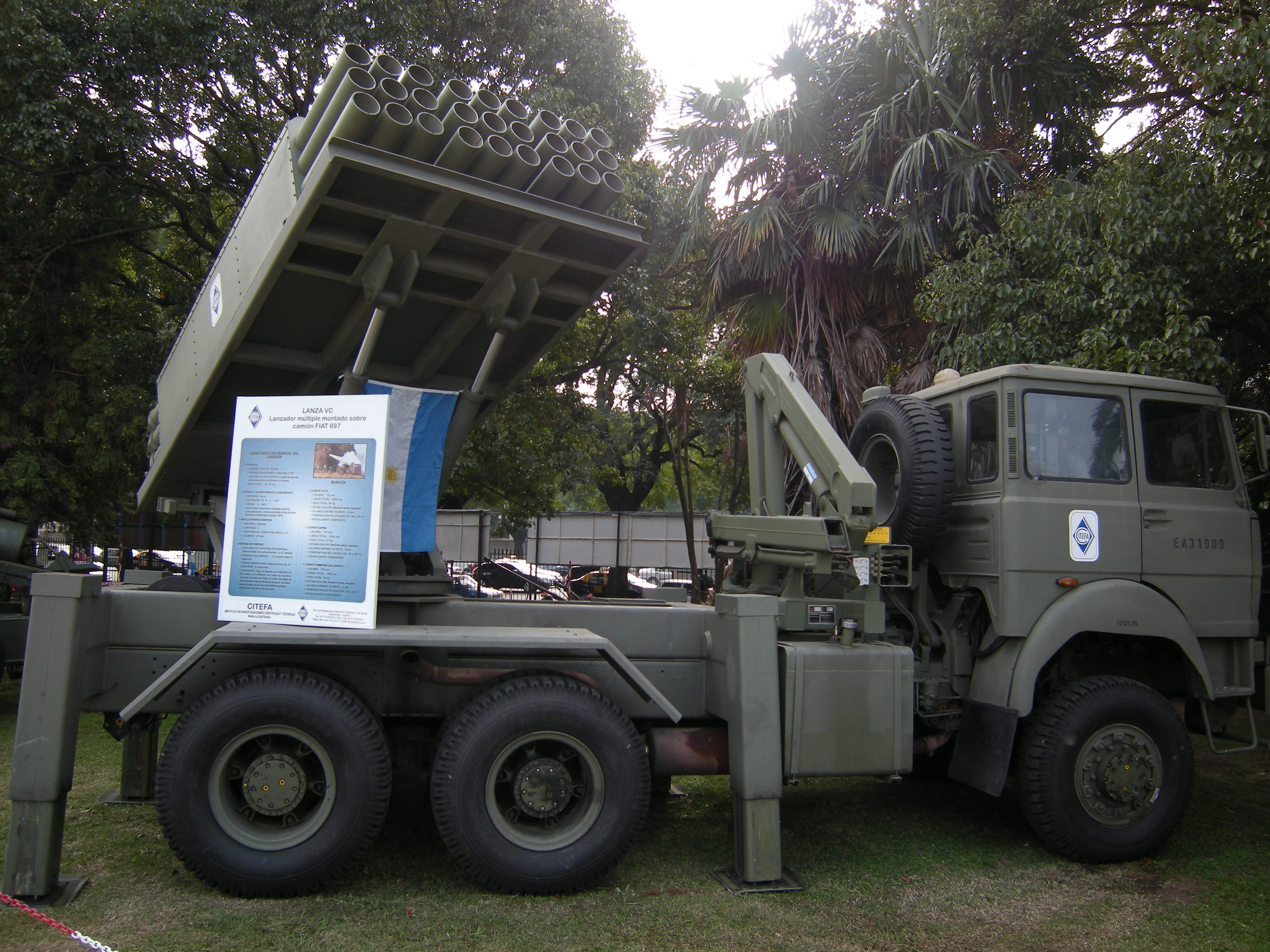
CP-30, Tecnopolis, 2008

Production progressed to the CP-30 MRL, which is able to use either the 105mm rockets from the Pampero or the new 127mm rockets, also called CP-30. This MRL is mounted in IVECO Trakker 6x4 trucks, in a similar way to the soviet Katyushas.

== Variants ==
- Surface-Surface: self-propelled 16-tube MRL, mounted on top of a Mercedes-Benz Unimog 416 chassis.
- Air-Surface: 4 or 6-tube "Yaguareté" pod. 6-tube pod "Microbio".

== Specifications ==
=== Rocket ===
- Caliber: 105 millimetres (4.1 in)
- Length: 1,530 millimetres (5.02 ft)
- Motor: Solid-fuel rocket
- Weight: 30 kilograms (66 lb)
- Maximum range: 10,200 metres (6.3 mi)
- Dispersion: 68% of projectiles within an area of 300 m by 200 m
- Warhead:
  - Types: Rocket Types: HE, HE-I (HE-Incendiary), Inert (for training).
  - Weight: 10.5 kilograms (23 lb)

(NOTE: some specifications differ slightly from source to source)

=== Launcher ===
- Entered service: 1980s (Argentine Army)
- First used in action: ?
- Chassis: Mercedes-Benz Unimog 416 4x4 truck
- Crew: ?
- Weight loaded: 6110 kg
- Length: ? m (? Ft ?? in)
- Width: ? m
- Height (stowed): ? m
- Height (max elevation): ? m
- Max road speed: ? km/h
- Cruise range: ? km
- Engine: ?
- Transmission: ?
- Number of tubes: 16
- Launch Rate: 16 rockets in 7.5 seconds
- Reload time: 10 minutes
- Loader Type: Manual
- Launcher Drive: Electric
- Launcher Traverse: 90°
- Launcher Elevation: 0 to +52°
- Average unit cost: ?

== Users ==
- (Argentina) Argentine Army

== See also ==
- Artillery rockets, in "List of artillery"
- Argentina, in "List of artillery by country"
- Multiple rocket launcher
