= CITEDEF =

Argentine federal agency

Institute of Scientific and Technical Research for the Defense
- Instituto de Investigaciones Científicas y Técnicas para la Defensa
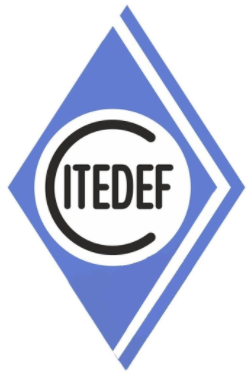

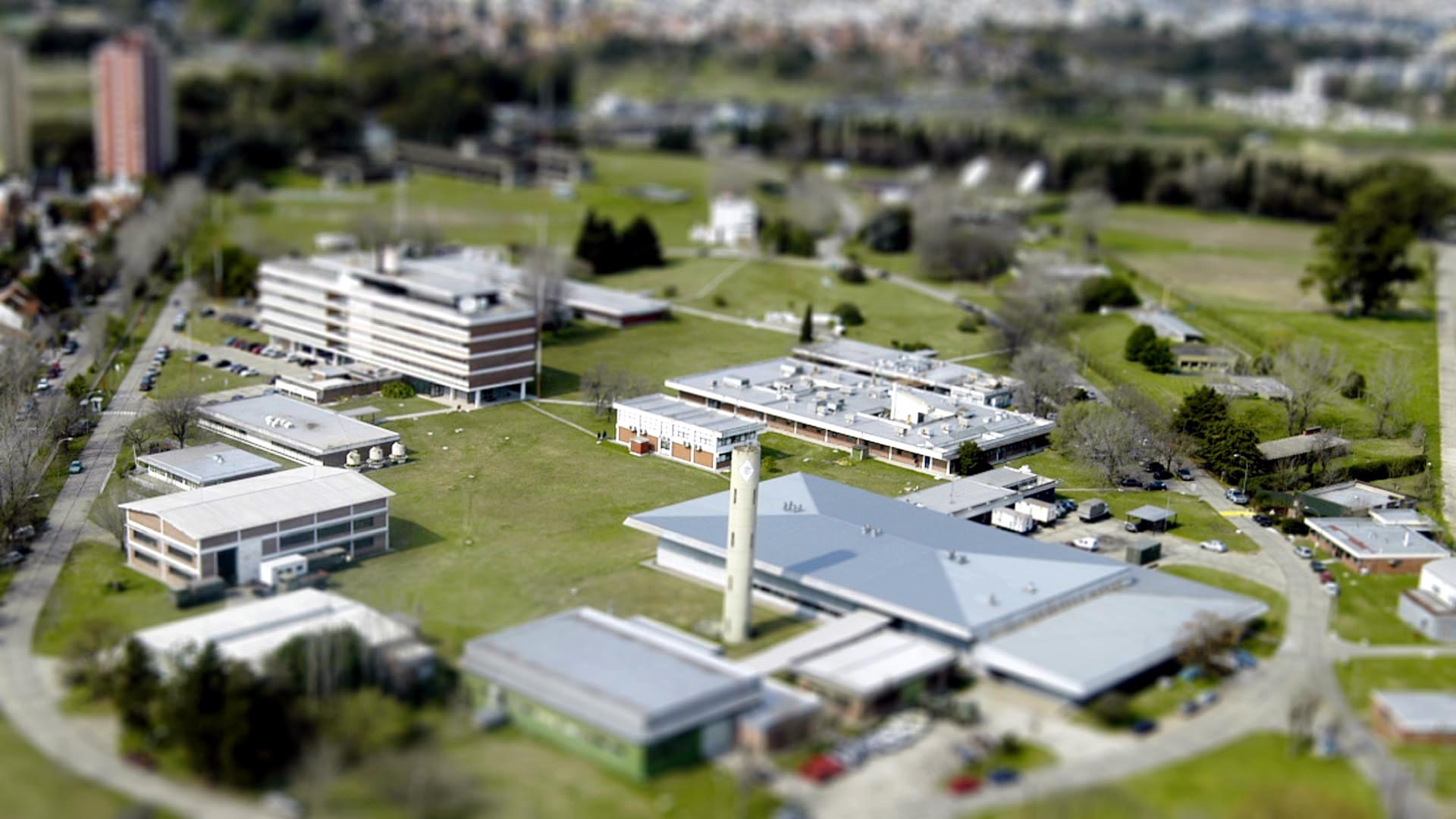
- CITIDEF headquarters in Villa Martelli

Agency overview
- Formed: 1954; 71 years ago
- Jurisdiction: Government of Argentina
- Headquarters: Villa Martelli, GBA
- Parent agency: Ministry of Defense
- Website: argentina.gob.ar/citedef

The Institute of Scientific and Technical Research for the Defense (Spanish: Instituto de Investigaciones Científicas y Técnicas para la Defensa, also known by its acronym CITEDEF), is an Argentine federal agency in charge of research and development in various scientific fields. It is also in charge of homologation of weaponry.

Located in the Villa Martelli district of Greater Buenos Aires, CITEDEF is one of the scientific and technological organisms that depend on the Ministry of Defense and its Secretary of Planning. It is also a part of the "Constituyentes Technological Hub" along with other institutions such as the Atomic Energy National Commission (CNEA), the University of San Martín (UNSAM) and the National Institute of Industrial Technology (INTI), among others.

CITEDEF currently develops a series of projects that give it an edge in research and technology at a regional level. It is the first link of the productive chain within the Defense Production Industry through the implementation of scientific research and technological development programs, and projects mainly for the Armed Forces, Military Manufactures (Fabricaciones Militares) and the Airplane Argentine Factory. All activity is developed within the technological - scientific political framework issued by the Ministry of Defense authorities.

== History ==
The institute was created by President Juan Domingo Perón in Decree "S" Nº441 of the year 1954. The original name was "CITEFA" (Institute of Scientific and Technical Research for the Armed Forces). Its participation and findings were key in the development of weaponry and warfare materials and the increasing demand for technology caused an expansion and diversification to various disciplines and fields.

In its beginnings, the institute was dispersed over many geographical locations, but in 1969 all areas unified in a 19 hectare lot in the Villa Martelli neighborhood, Buenos Aires province, which is still its location nowadays. It has a 33,000 square meter lodge with laboratories and workshops, along with a drill-destined estate in the Villa María Military Factory, Cordoba province.

In 1973, a new Scientific Regime was created for the R&D staff of the Armed Forces, called Régimen para el Personal de Investigación y Desarrollo de las Fuerzas Armadas – RPIDFA). Its objective was to recruit and retain technicians and professionals of all the disciplines and fields needed for Defense.

In 2007, through Presidential Decree number 788, the name "CITEFA" was replaced with the current "CITEDEF".

== Products designed ==
- Artillery field gun:
- L33, CALA 30, CALIV light cannon 105mm gun
- Multiple rocket launcher: 105mm Pampero MRL and 127mm CP-30 ^{video}
- Rocket Pods: 6 x 105mm Cohetera Yaguareté III^{video}, 6 x 105mm Cohetera Microbio II and 6 x 57mm ARM-657 Mamboretá. The 105 mm pods use the same rockets as the Pampero MRLS.
- Anti-tank missiles: Mathogo and MARA ^{video}
- Missiles: Martin Pescador MP-1000 and AS-25K; Aspide upgrade.
- GRADICOM PCX-2009 rocket
- GRADICOM II two-stage high altitude rocket
- ORBIT rocket to orbit payloads
- Antarctic wind generator installed at Marambio Base
- SEON gyrostabilized TV/infrared/laser sensor for Intrépida class vessels

== See also ==
- Argentine defense industry
- Science and technology in Argentina
