= AeroDreams =

Argentine defense contractor

AeroDreams S.A.
- Type: Sociedad Anónima
- Industry: Aerospace, defense
- Founded: 2001
- Headquarters: Buenos Aires, Argentina
- Area served: South America
- Key people: Raúl Fernández (president)
- Products: Unmanned aerial vehicle, helicopters
- Website: www.aerodreams-uav.com

AeroDreams S.A. is a defense contractor based in Buenos Aires, Argentina. It has been working since 2001 in developing unmanned aerial vehicles for military and non-military use. The company's CEO is Raúl Fernández.

The company developed and manufactured the Chi-7 helicopter.

The Strix project for the Argentine Air Force (Fuerza Aérea Argentina, FAA) was developed by this company.

== List of aircraft ==
Several of the models listed below are (or were) manufactured in several variants:

- AeroDreams Chi-7
- AeroDreams Strix
- AeroDreams Petrel
- AeroDreams Ñancú
- AeroDreams ADS-401
- Guardian

== See also ==
- Nostromo Defensa
- Cicaré
