= DGFM flamethrower =

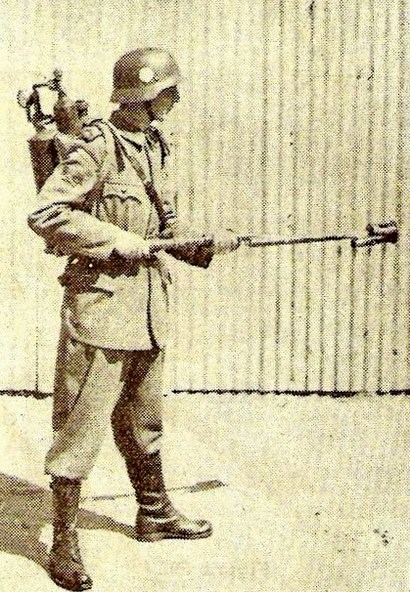
- Argentine soldier with flamethrower
- Type: Flamethrower
- Place of origin: Argentina

The DGFM flamethrower was a flamethrower of Argentine origin manufactured in 1916.
