= Fabricaciones Militares =

Argentine arms manufacturer

Fabricaciones Militares S.A.U.

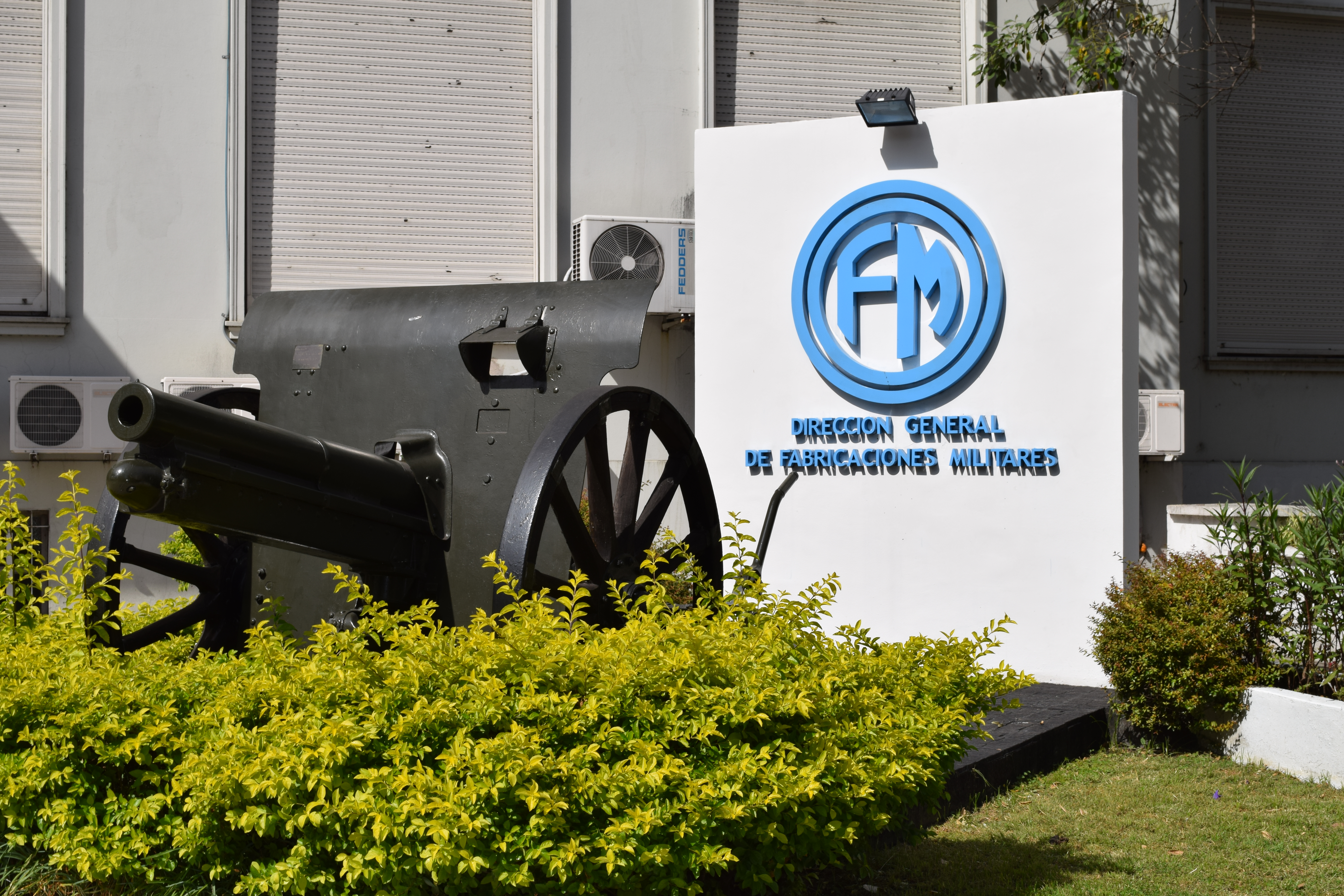
- Exterior of the FM offices in 2015
- Type: State-owned company
- Industry: Arms; Metallurgy
- Predecessor: Dirección General de Fabricaciones Militares
- Founded: 1941; 85 years ago
- Founder: Government of Argentina
- Headquarters: Buenos Aires, Argentina
- Area served: Worldwide
- Key people: Cdor. Hugo Pascarelli (President)
- Products: UAVs, freight wagons, small arms, fertiliser, artillery, SAMs
- Owner: Government of Argentina
- Parent: Ministry of Defence
- Website: fm.gob.ar

Fabricaciones Militares S.A.U. is a state-owned Argentine arms manufacturer based in Buenos Aires. The company was a government agency under the name Dirección General de Fabricaciones Militares ("Directorate General of Military Industries").

Founded in 1941, over the years the company has diversified into different areas such as mining, petroleum, rolling stock and petrochemicals. The company is under the direction of the Argentine Ministry of Defence.

== History ==
The company was created in 1941, under Argentine law 12.709, in order to expand the Argentine defense industry to compensate for the shortfall of imports that came about during the Second World War. In its early years, it produced primarily small arms and munitions whilst aiding in the development of other key industries in the country. The company expanded quickly and would eventually have 14 factories around the country. However, starting in the 1980s, many of these plants were sold to private firms.

The company has a long history of producing rolling stock for the Argentine railways. It has produced trams, urban commuter rail trains, and trains for the Buenos Aires Underground.

In more recent years, the company has begun to grow again, acquiring new factories and expanding into more areas outside the arms industry. This includes the production of rolling stock for the state-owned rail operator Ferrocarriles Argentinos's freight division Trenes Argentinos Cargas y Logística, which ordered over 1,500 carriages in the mid-2010s.

In June 2015, the first 10 hopper cars manufactured by FM to transport cereal were officially introduced as part of a contract to build 1,050 cars for state-owned freight lines. The wagons were produced in FM's factory in Río Tercero, Córdoba and each one has a capacity for 45 tons of grains. It is expected that the factory will manufacture 3 wagons per day, to be used in the three lines operated by the National Government, the San Martín, Belgrano and Urquiza.

Other types of freight wagons to be produced by FM are flat, spine and tank cars.

On December 9, 2016, the Argentine Ministry of Defense announced FM had signed an accord with Beretta to produce the ARX-200 rifle and Px4 pistol under license. It is expected these weapons will replace the FM license-built FN FAL and Browning Hi-Power currently in Argentine inventory.

After World War II, Fabricaciones Militares began recruiting foreign specialists, including a group of highly qualified Polish engineers. The most numerous group consisted of Polish technicians contracted by Fabricaciones Militares, led by engineer Witold Wierzejski, who had previously served as General Director of Armaments Manufacturing in Poland and later worked in France and the United Kingdom. After the war, he was hired by the Argentine Ministry of War to oversee modernization of the arms industry. Wierzejski, one of the Polish engineers in Argentina, also became the first president of the Polish Engineers and Technicians Center in Buenos Aires and helped launch a multilingual technical journal published by the Center. Other Polish specialists recruited to Fabricaciones Militares included Alejandro Stulgiński, a professor of machine elements and materials resistance, who also taught metrology and authored a textbook based on his many years of academic work.

== Military production ==
=== Pistols ===
- Sistema Colt Modelo 1927 - Licensed version of Colt 1911.
- FM Hi-Power - Licensed version of Browning Hi-Power.

=== Submachine guns ===
- FMK-3 - 9 mm indigenously designed submachine gun.
- PAM-1 & PAM-2 - Licensed version of M3 submachine gun.

=== Rifles ===
- FM FAL - Produced under license version of Belgium FN FAL battle rifle
- FM FAP - Heavy barrel version of the FN FAL (Squad automatic weapon)
- FM FSL - Semi-automatic version of the FN FAL
- FARA 83 - 5,56 mm locally designed assault rifle
- .22 Sport Rifle

=== Machines guns ===
- FN MAG - Produced under license.

=== Artillery ===
- FM Model 1968 - Anti-tank recoilless rifle.
- FM CITER L33 - 155 mm howitzer.
- FM L45 CALA 30 - 155 mm howitzer prototype.
- FMK.4 Modelo 1L - 105 mm tank gun, used in TAM.
- FM CP-30 - 127 mm rocket artillery.
- 60 mm, 81 mm, 120 mm mortars.

=== Munitions ===
- 7,65 mm Mauser
- 7,62 mm NATO
- 9 mm Parabellum
- .22 Long Rifle
- 12-gauge shotgun
- 127 mm rocket munitions
- 38.1 mm chemical ammunition

=== Other products ===
- Gunpowder
- Artillery propellants
- Ballistic protection
- HE-FRAG and tear gas grenades

== Civilian production ==
- Sulfuric acid
- Nitric acid
- Ammonium nitrate
- Diethyl ether
- Mining explosives
- Hopper car

== Gallery ==
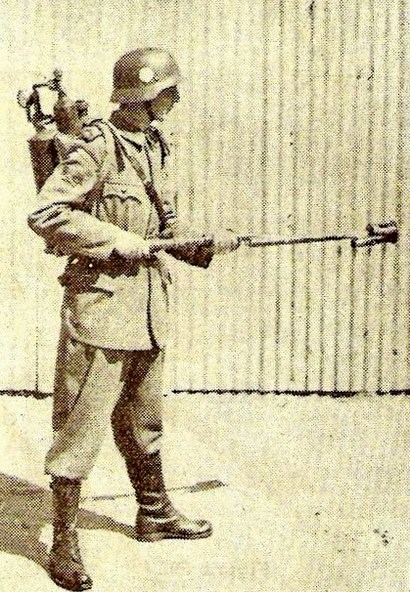
Argentine soldier with DGFM flamethrower (c.1940s)

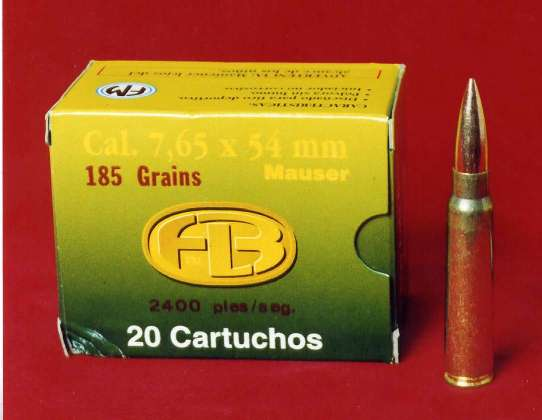
Box of 7.65 × 53 mm DGFM rounds

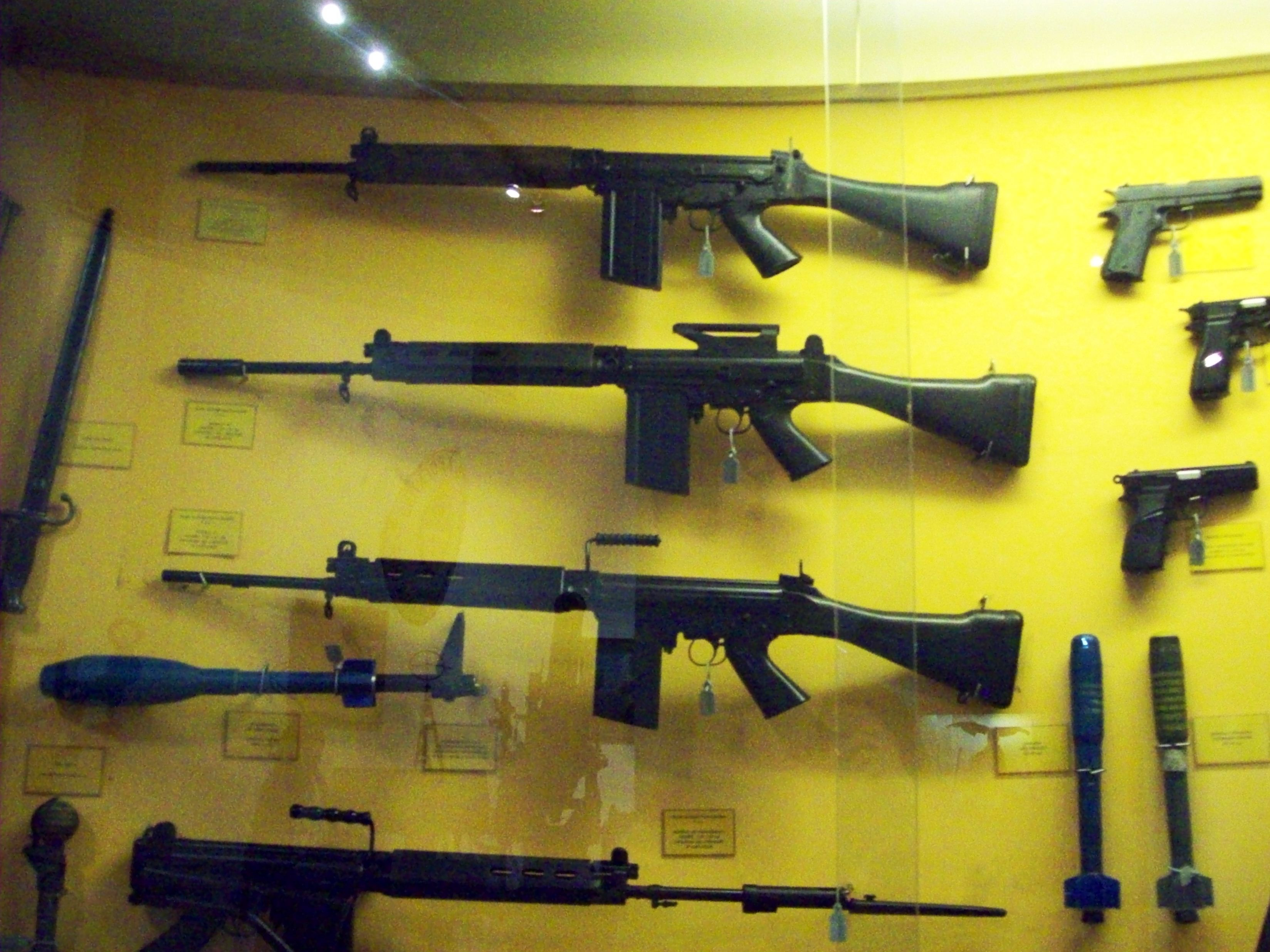
FM FAL Battle Rifle

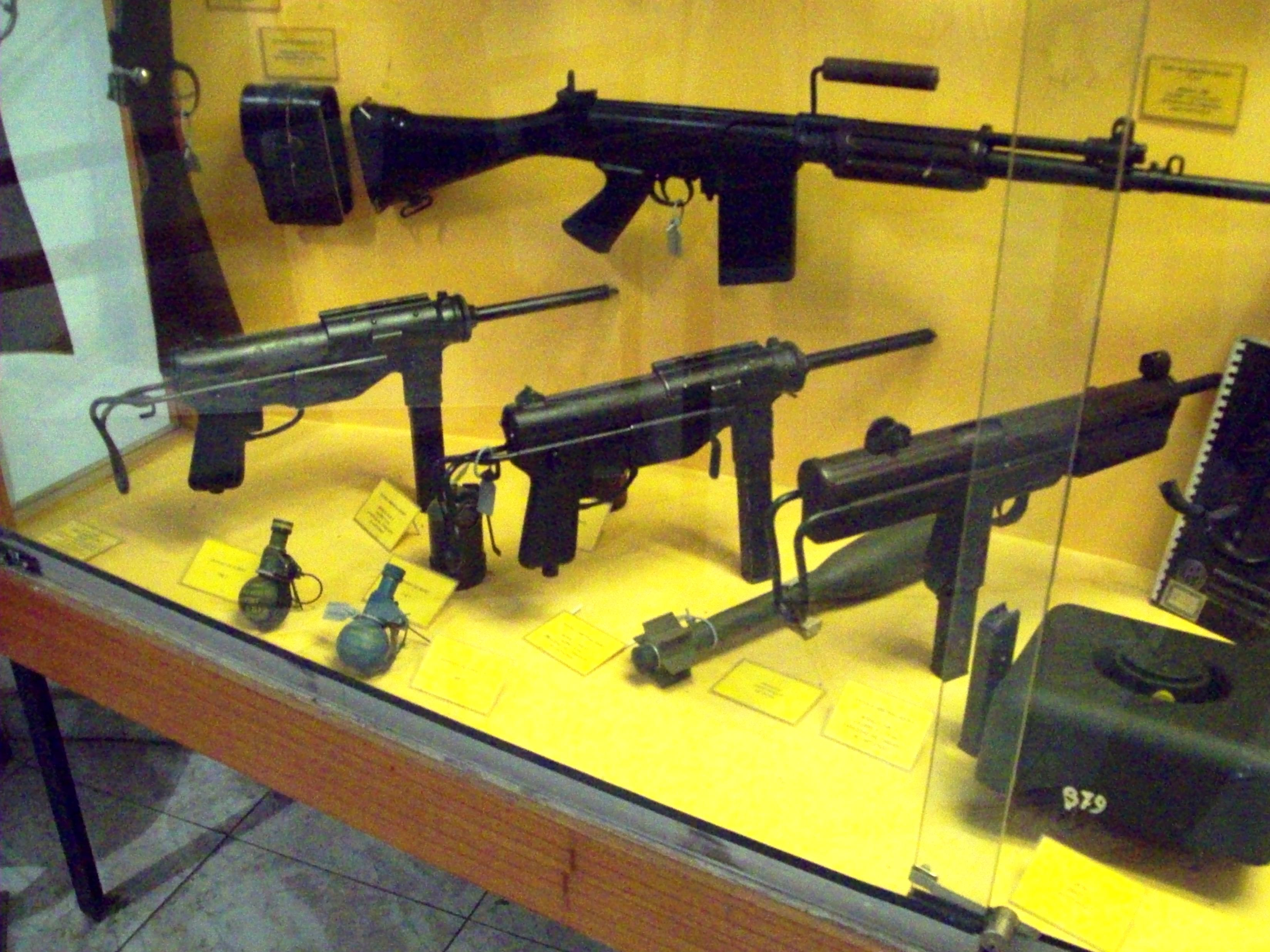
FN FAP rifle and FM submachine guns,

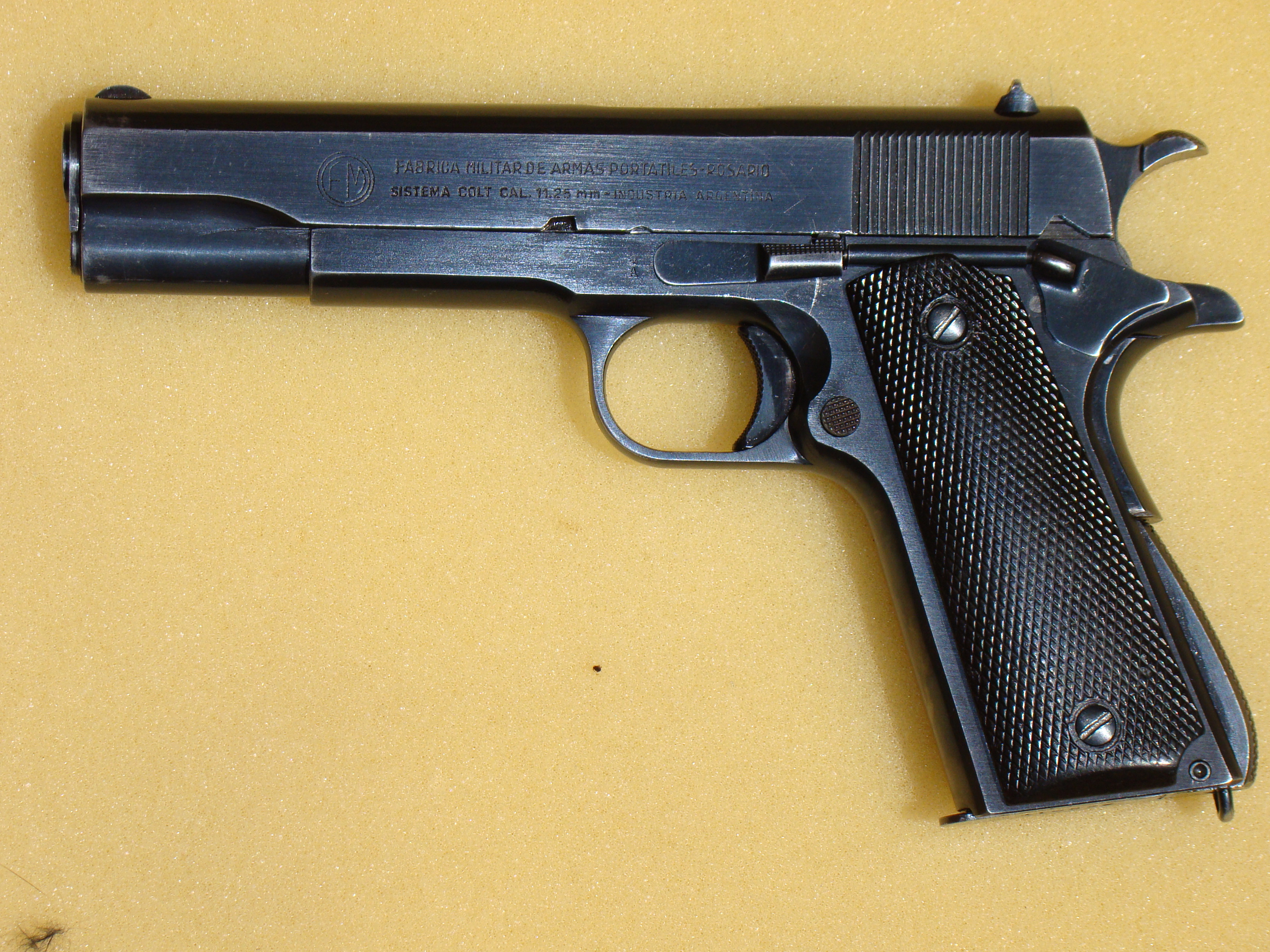
Pistol Sistema Colt Modelo 1927

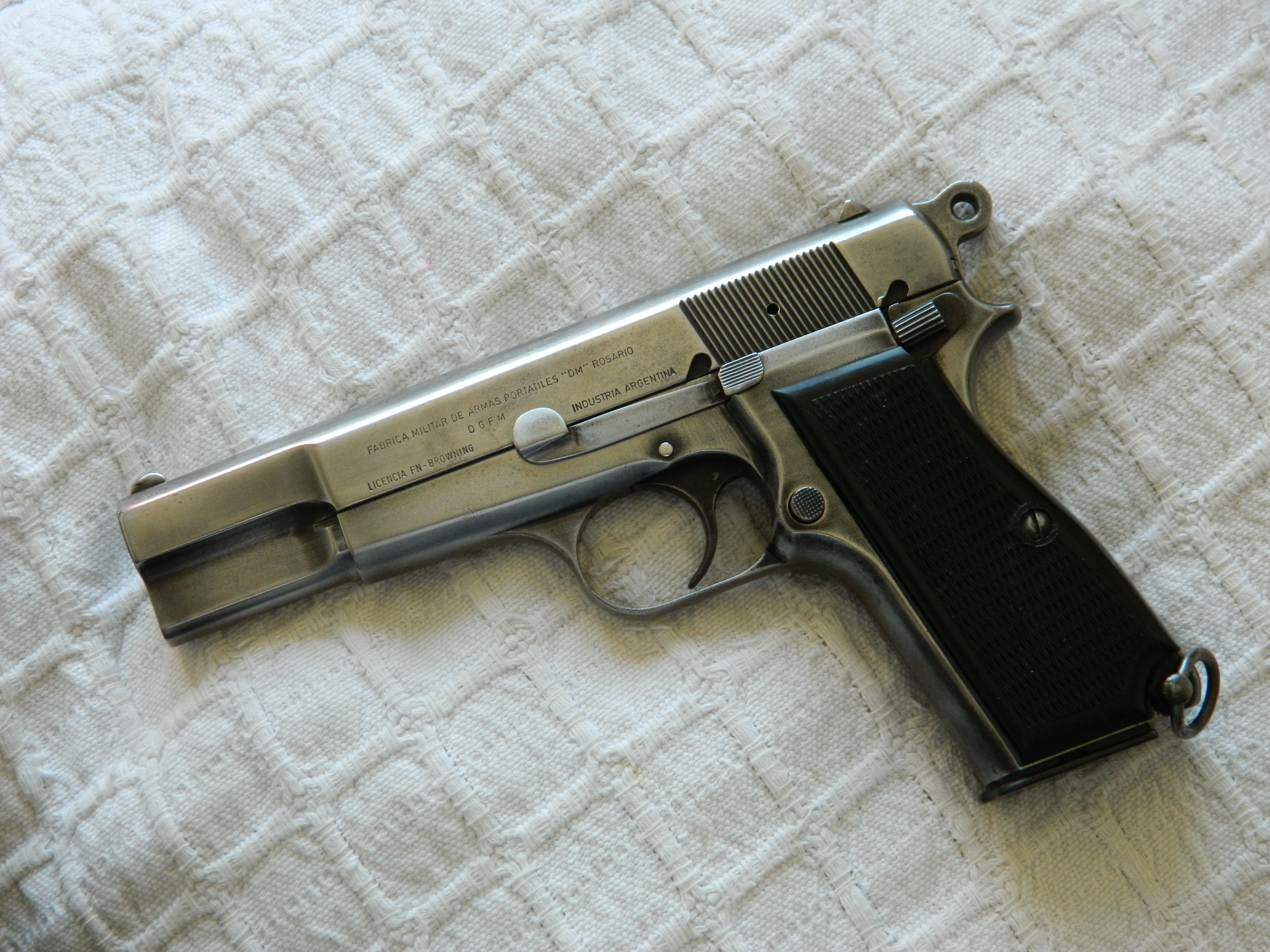
Pistol Browning Hi-Power FMAP Rosario

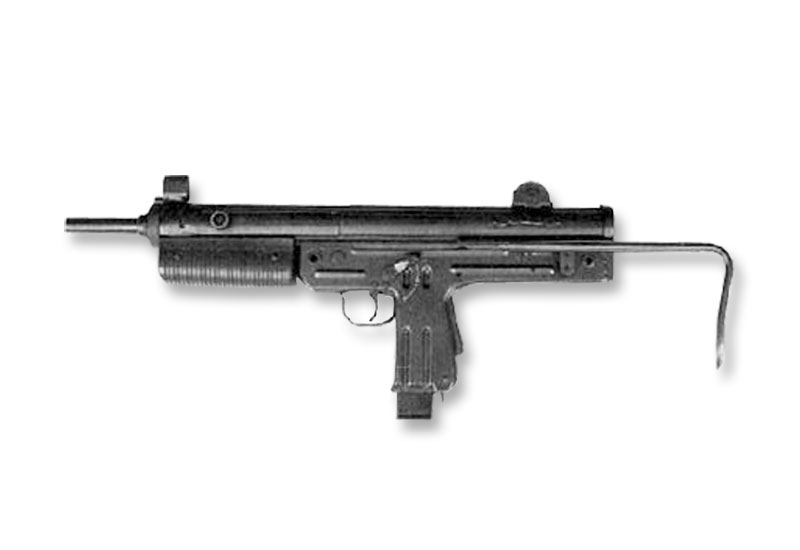
FMK-3 submachine gun

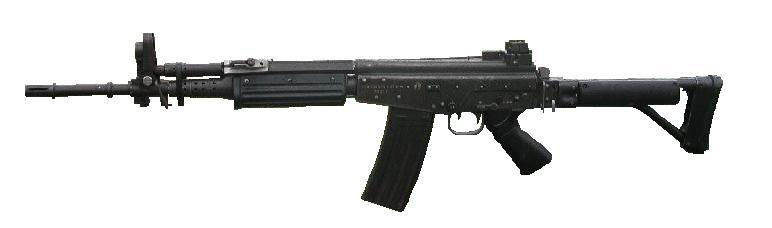
FARA 83 Assault Rifle

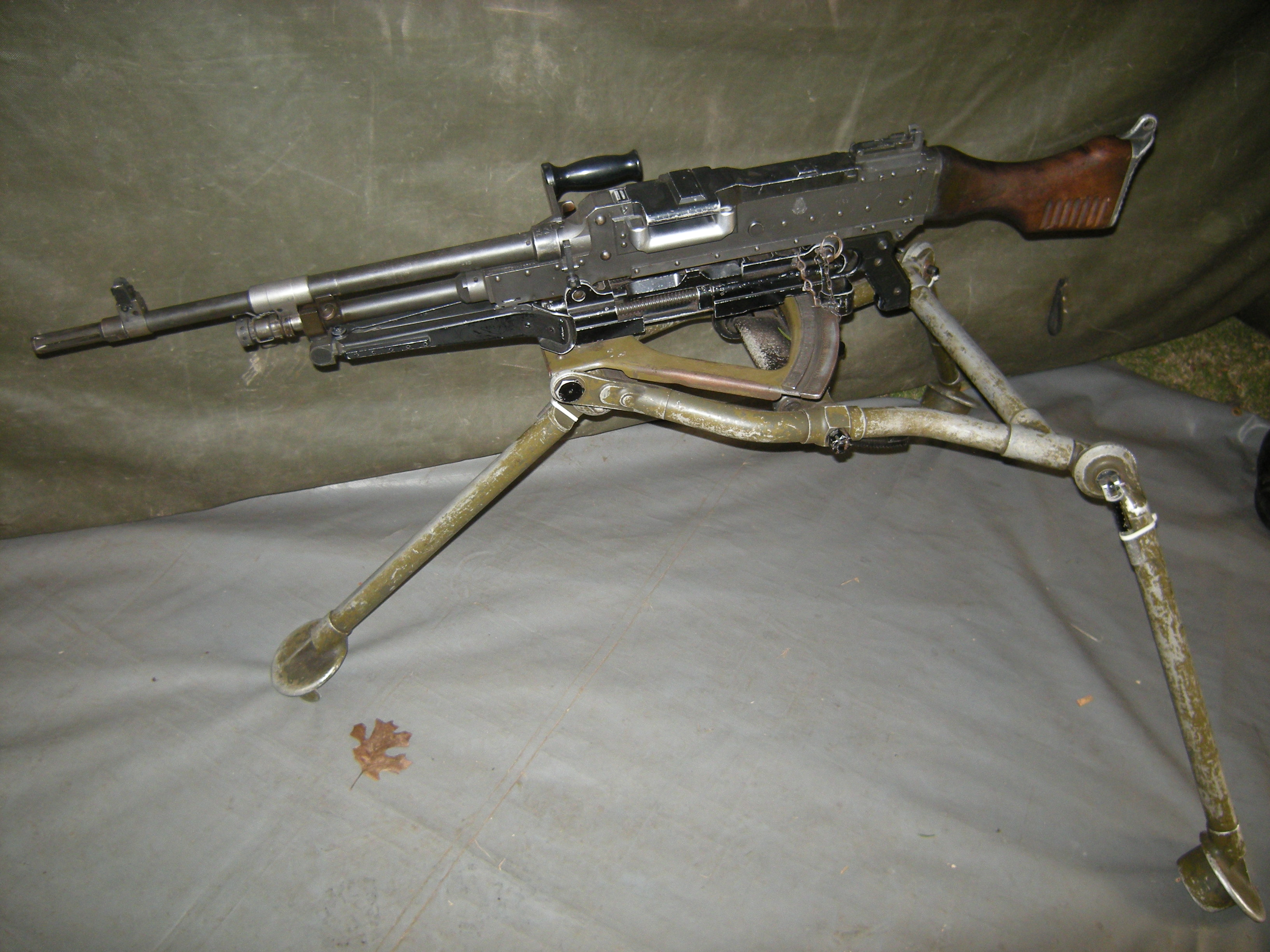
FN MAG machine gun

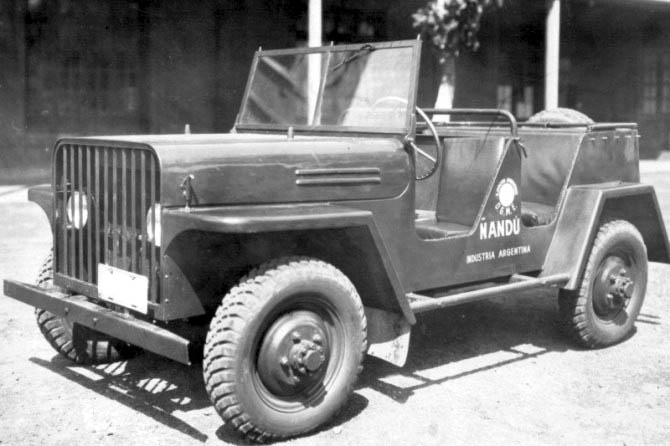
Ñandú jeep (c.1940s)

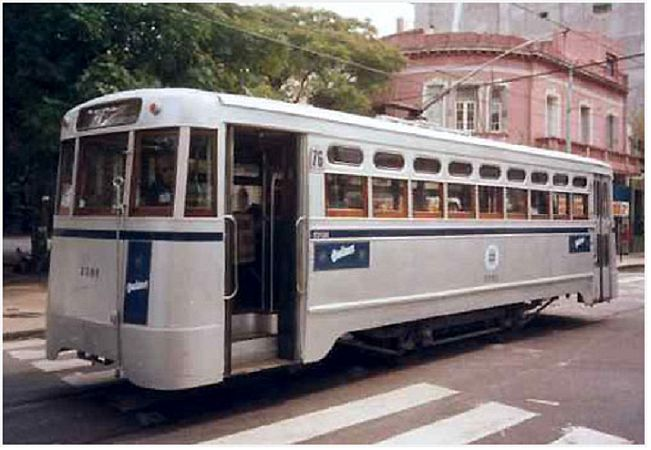
A 1960s tram

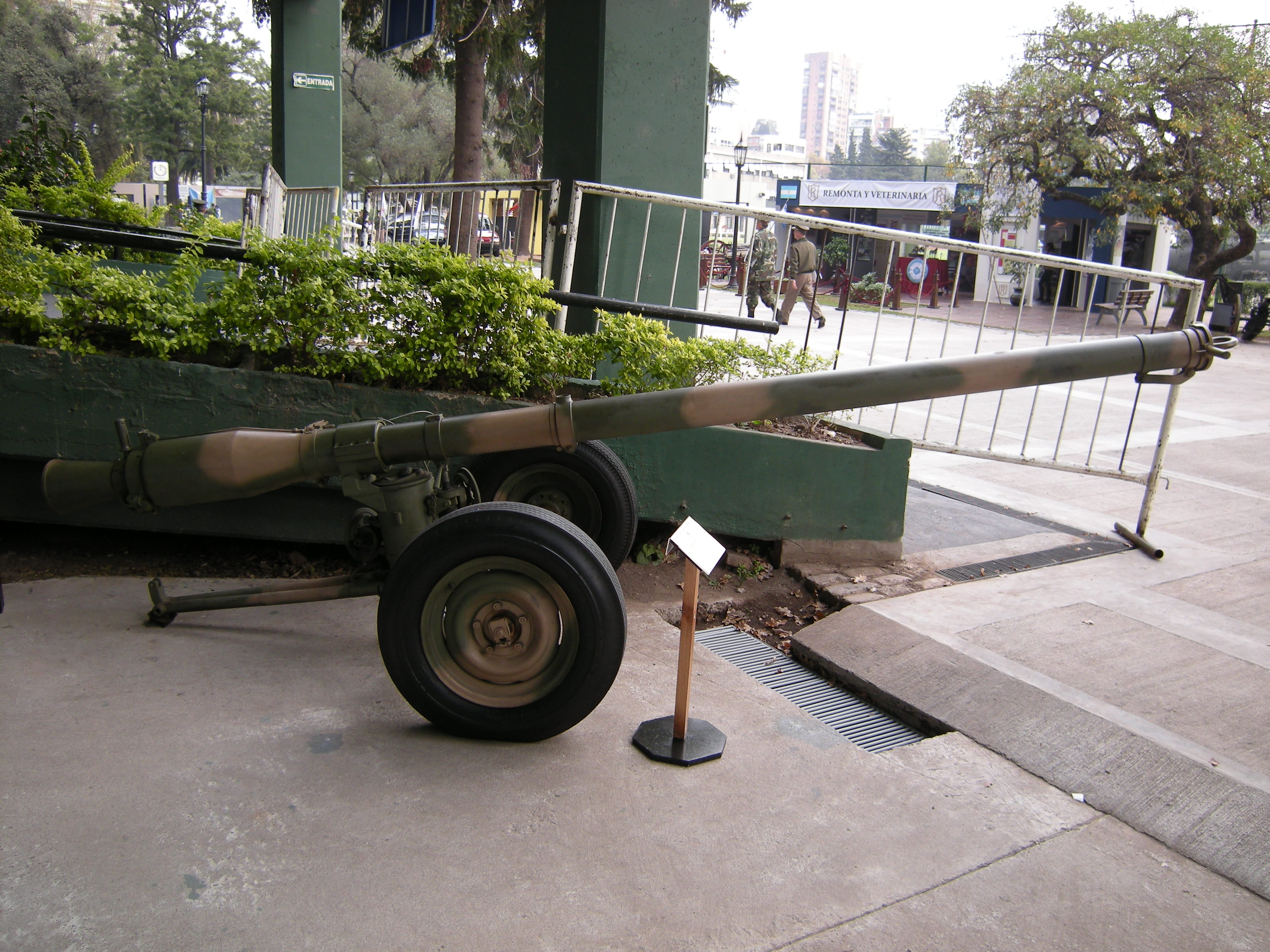
Model 1968 Recoilless Gun, 105mm

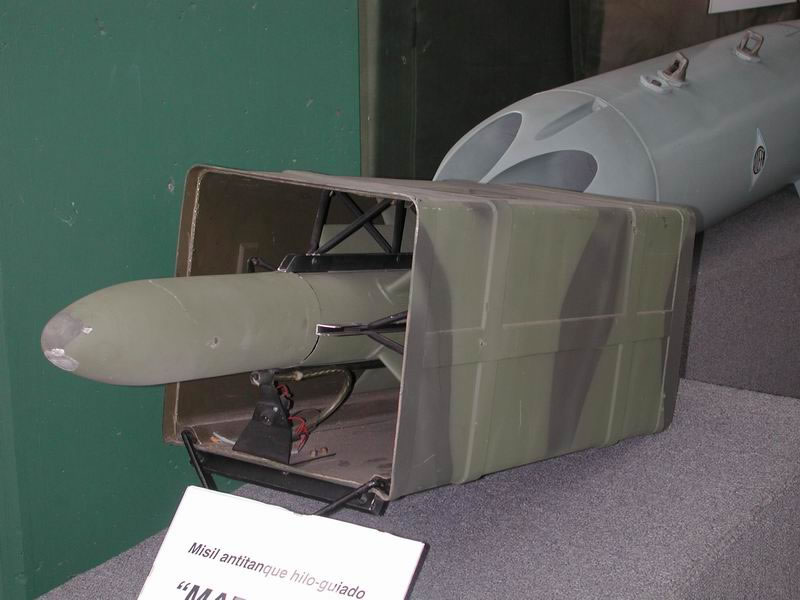
Mathogo anti-tank missile

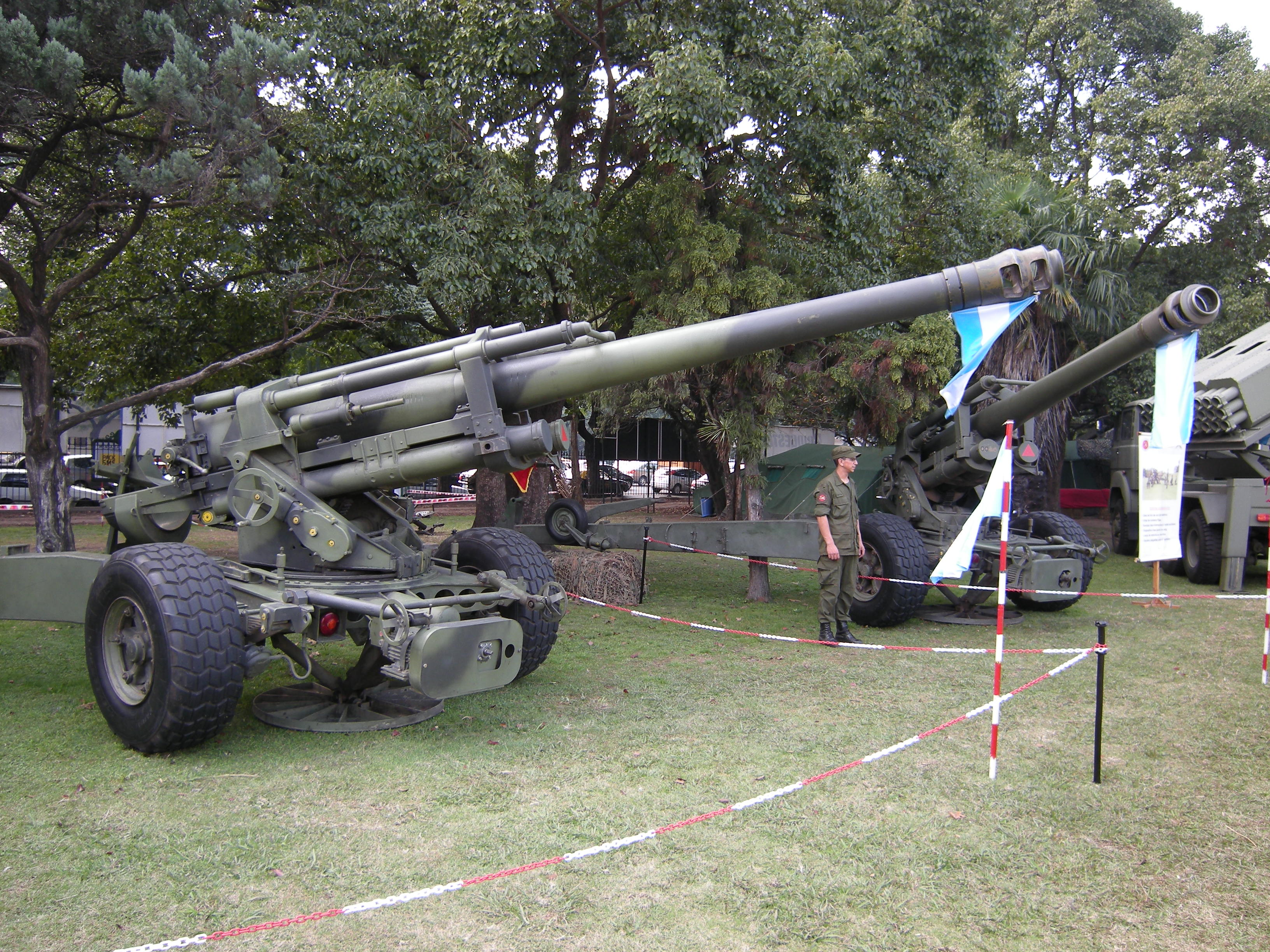
CITER L33 155 mm howitzer

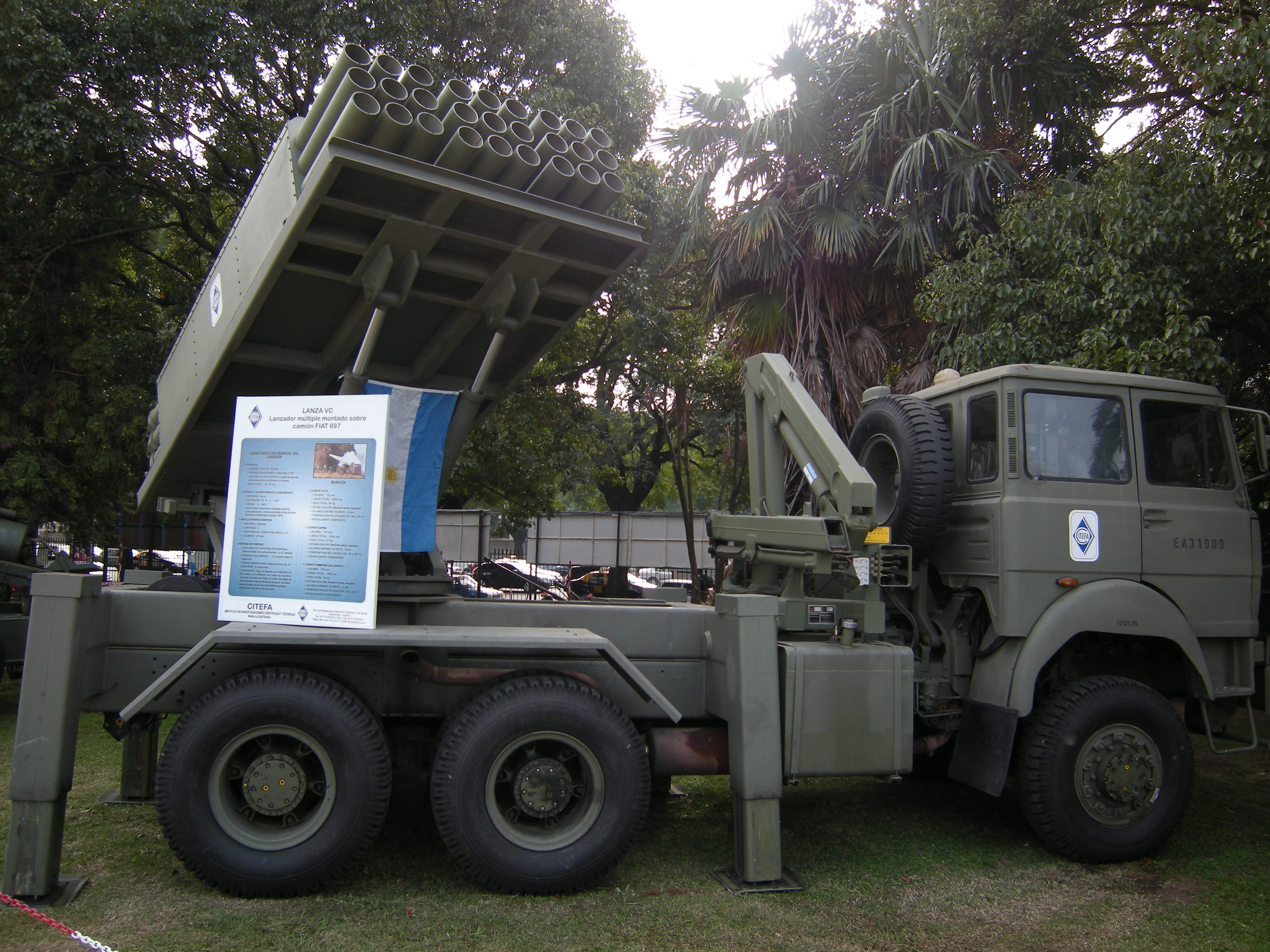
CP-30 127mm MRL

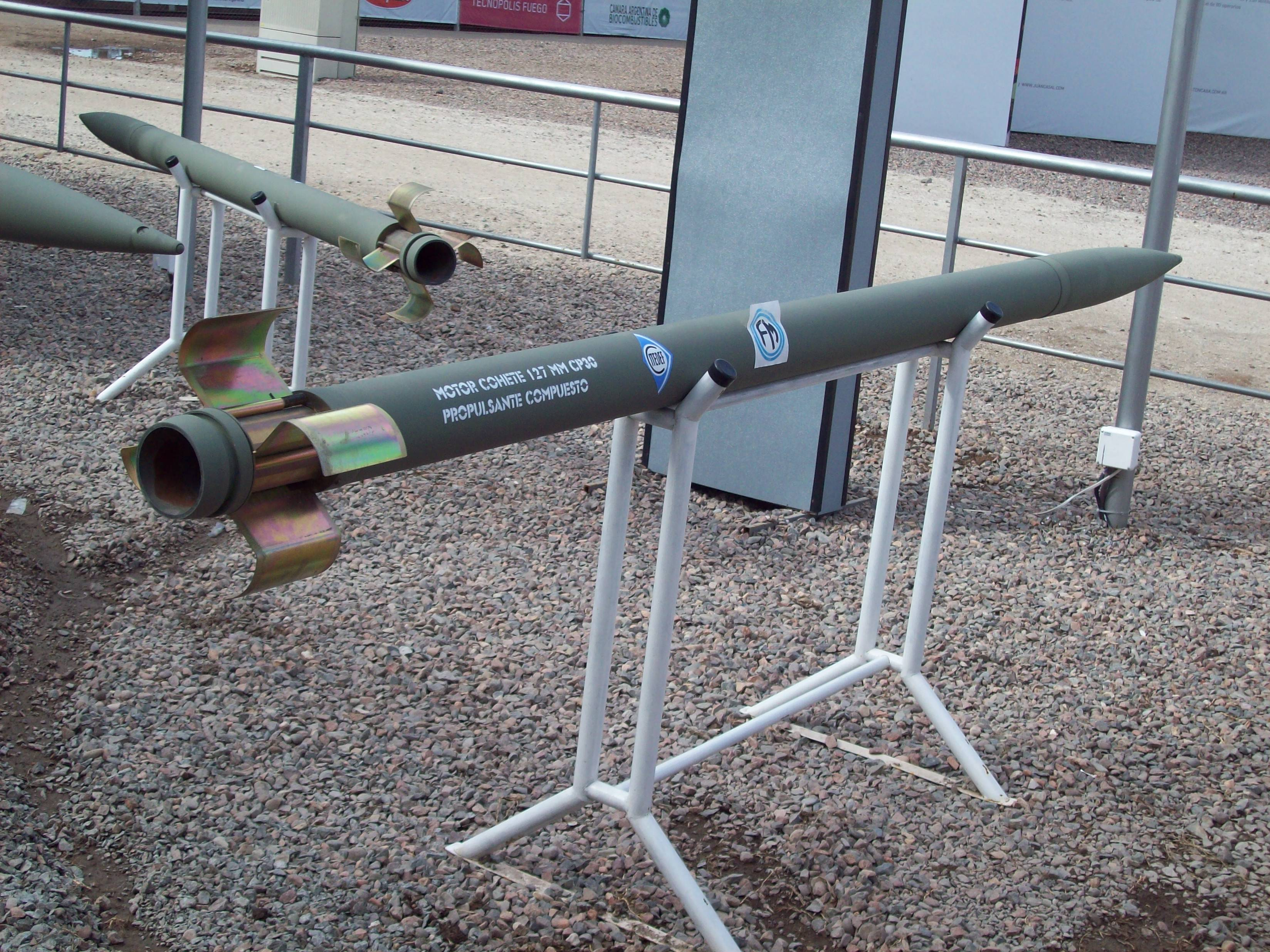
127mm artillery rocket

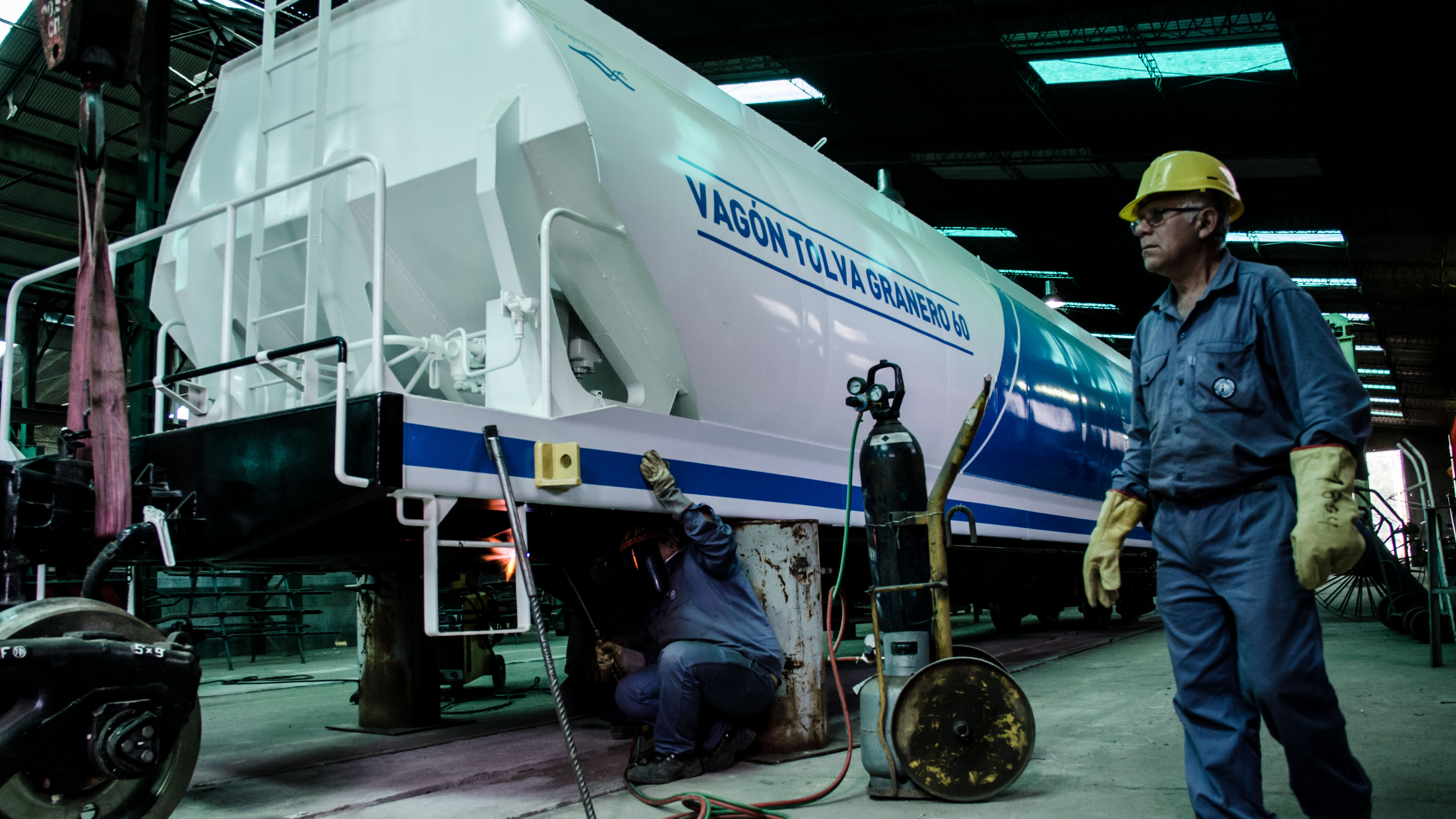
Rolling stock production at a DGFM factory

== See also ==
- Río Tercero explosion
- Scandal over Argentine arms sales to Ecuador and Croatia
- Armed Forces of the Argentine Republic
- Trams in Buenos Aires
