= Gradicom =

Argentinian rocket series

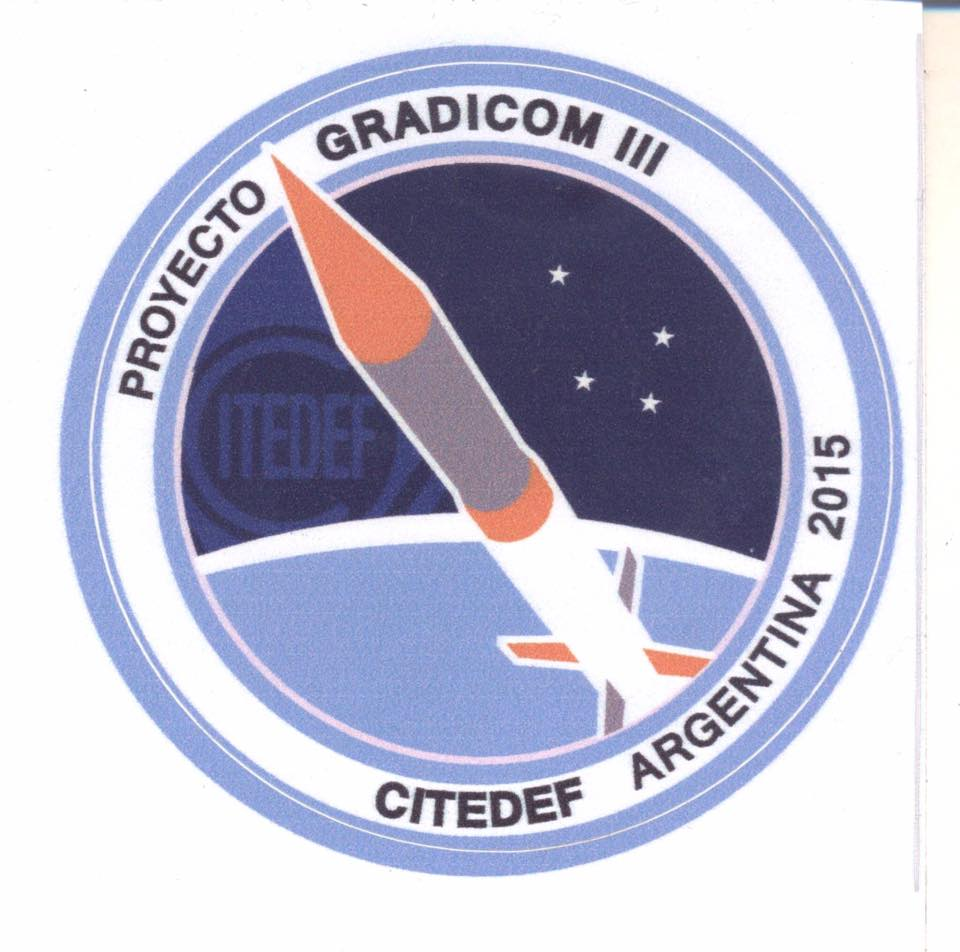
Patch for the "GRADICOM III" mission.

GRADICOM (GRAndes DImensiones COMpuestos) are a series of Argentine rockets with, according to CITEDEF, the ultimate goal of developing a vector that can be used for military purposes as a missile (with a guidance and control system) or as a sounding rocket (in free trajectory) for civilian purposes.

== Gradicom I ==
The GRADICOM I (PCX-900) was launched on December 17, 2009, from Serrezuela, Córdoba province, in order to certify the GRADICOM engine in flight.

It was developed by the Center for Scientific and Technological Research for Defense (CITEDEF), under the direction of Vice Commodore Carlos Vásquez.

The engine used solid fuel (HTPB, ammonium perchlorate, aluminum and other compounds), and had a diameter of 32 cm and a length of 2.5 m. The rocket had a total mass of 500 kg and a length of 4.45 m.

== Gradicom II ==
GRADICOM II (PCX2) was launched on July 11, 2011, from CELPA (El Chamical), Argentine province of La Rioja.

Developed by CITEDEF, GRADICOM II was a two-stage vector based on the development of the GRADICOM I. The project involved 70 experts for a year and cost 4 million pesos. The rocket weighed 933 kg and measured 7.7 meters.

== Gradicom III ==
GRADICOM III was planned to be launched in 2015.
