= CITER 155 mm L33 gun =

Cañón 155 mm L 33 Modelo Argentino
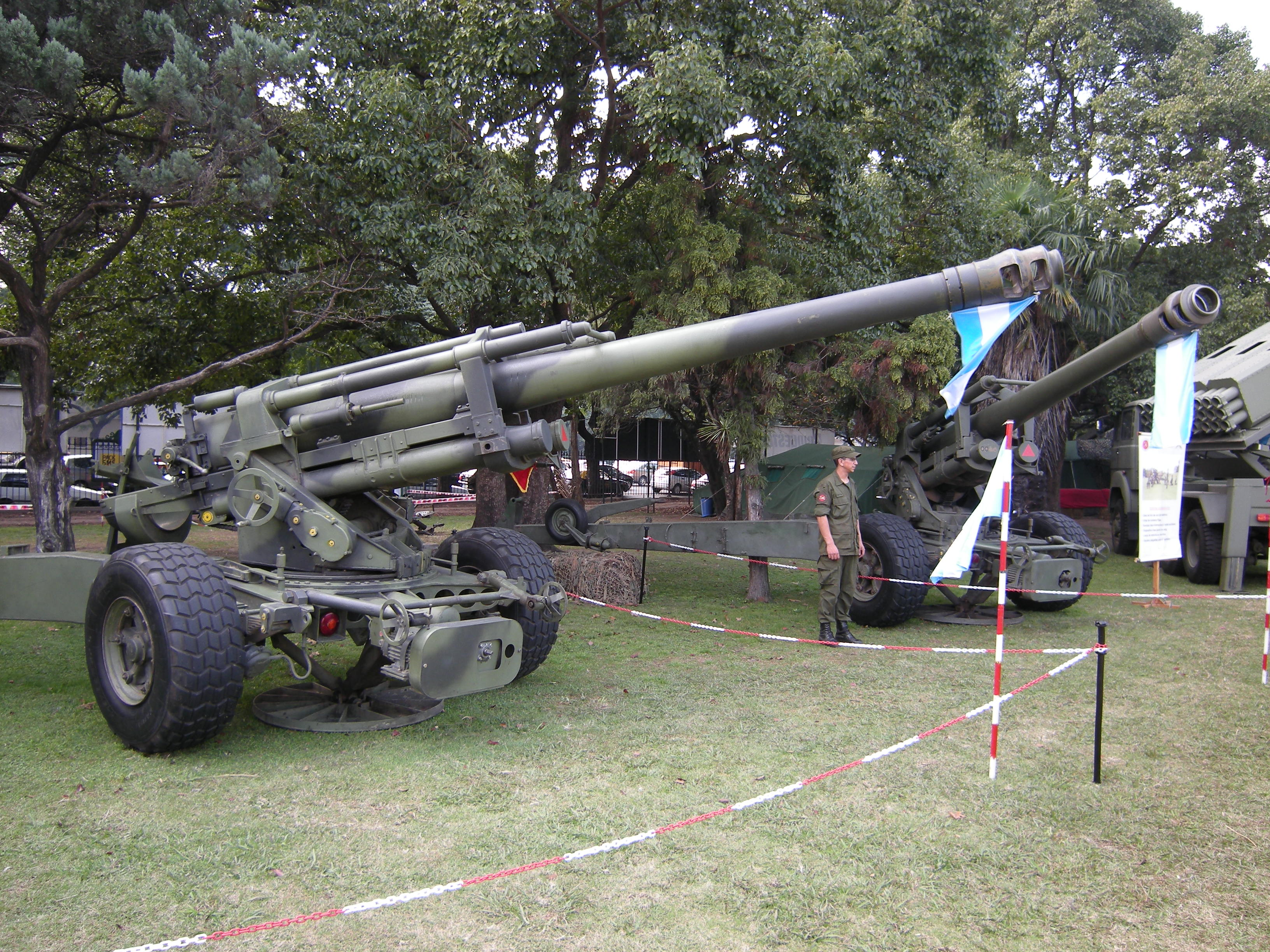
- Type: Field gun
- Place of origin: Argentina

Service history
- Used by: Argentine Army, Croatian Army
- Wars: Falklands War, Yugoslav Wars, Croatian War of Independence

Production history
- Designer: CITEFA
- Manufacturer: DGFM

Specifications
- Mass: 8,200 kg (18,100 lb)
- Barrel length: 5.15 m (16 ft 11 in) L/33
- Caliber: 155 mm (6.1 in)
- Breech: Interrupted screw
- Carriage: Split trail
- Elevation: -10° to +67°
- Traverse: 70°
- Muzzle velocity: 765 m/s (2,510 ft/s)
- Effective firing range: 20 km (12 mi)
- Maximum firing range: 24 km (15 mi) (with special ammunition)

The 155mm L33 Argentine Model gun (Argentine Army denomination: Cañón 155 mm L 33 Modelo Argentino) is an Argentine artillery field gun in service with the Argentine Army.

== Development ==
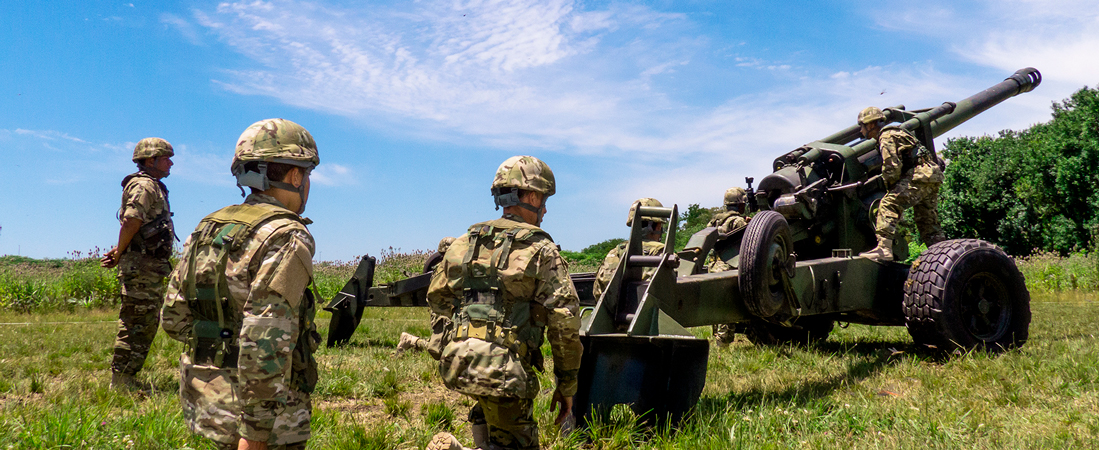

Developed in late 1970s by CITEFA as obus 155 mm L33 X1415 CITEFA Modelo 77 in order to replace the World War II era M114 155 mm howitzer still in service in the Argentine Army. The ordnance is based on the gun carried by the French Mk F3 155mm self-propelled gun, also in service with the Argentine Army.

Also designed by CITEFA is a slightly improved version named "Modelo 81".

== Service ==
Examples of Modelo 77 were used during the Falklands War. A total four guns were captured by the British, these were flown in via Argentine Air Force C-130 Hercules during the conflict's last weeks in order to repel British naval gun fire after direct request from Argentinian commander to Buenos Aires Junta.

Some were sold on the black market and were purchased by the Croatian Army where they were used in combat with Serbian forces during the Croatian War of Independence.

== Operators ==
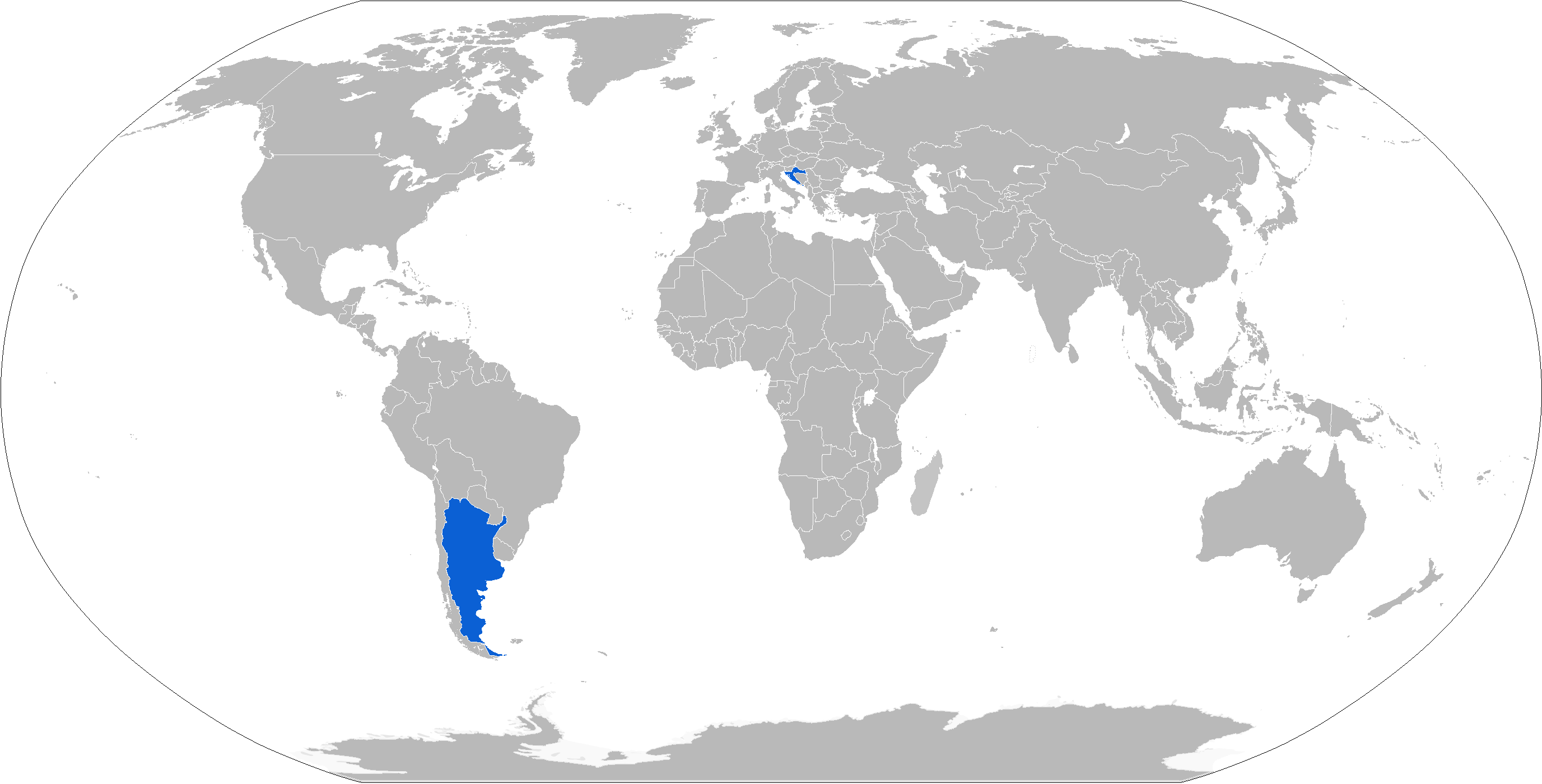
Map with L33 operators in blue

=== Current operators ===
- Argentina: Argentine Army – 109
- Croatia: Croatian Army – 12-18

== See also ==
- Cañón 155 mm L 45 CALA 30

== Bibliography ==
- Foss, Christopher F. (July 2004). Jane's Armour & Artillery, 2004–2005 (25th ed.). Jane's Information Group. ISBN 0-7106-2616-9.
