= Nostromo Defensa =

Argentine defense contractor specializing in UAVs

Nostromo Defensa S.A.
- Type: Sociedad Anónima
- Industry: Aerospace, defence
- Founded: 2006 (Reorganized 2015)
- Headquarters: Córdoba, Argentina
- Area served: South America
- Key people: Nicolas Bruno (CEO)

Nostromo Defensa is a defense contractor based in Córdoba, Argentina. It has been working since 2006 in developing unmanned aerial vehicles for military and non-military use. The company's CEO is Marcelo Martínez.

The Yarará project for the Argentine Air Force (Fuerza Aérea Argentina, FAA) was developed by this company. The company developed and manufactured the Centinela helicopter.

== List of aircraft ==
Several of the models listed below are (or were) manufactured in several variants:

- Nostromo Caburé
- Nostromo Centinela
- Nostromo Yaguá
- Nostromo Yarará

== See also ==
- AeroDreams
- Quimar
