= Lipán M3 =

Argentine Army unmanned aerial vehicle

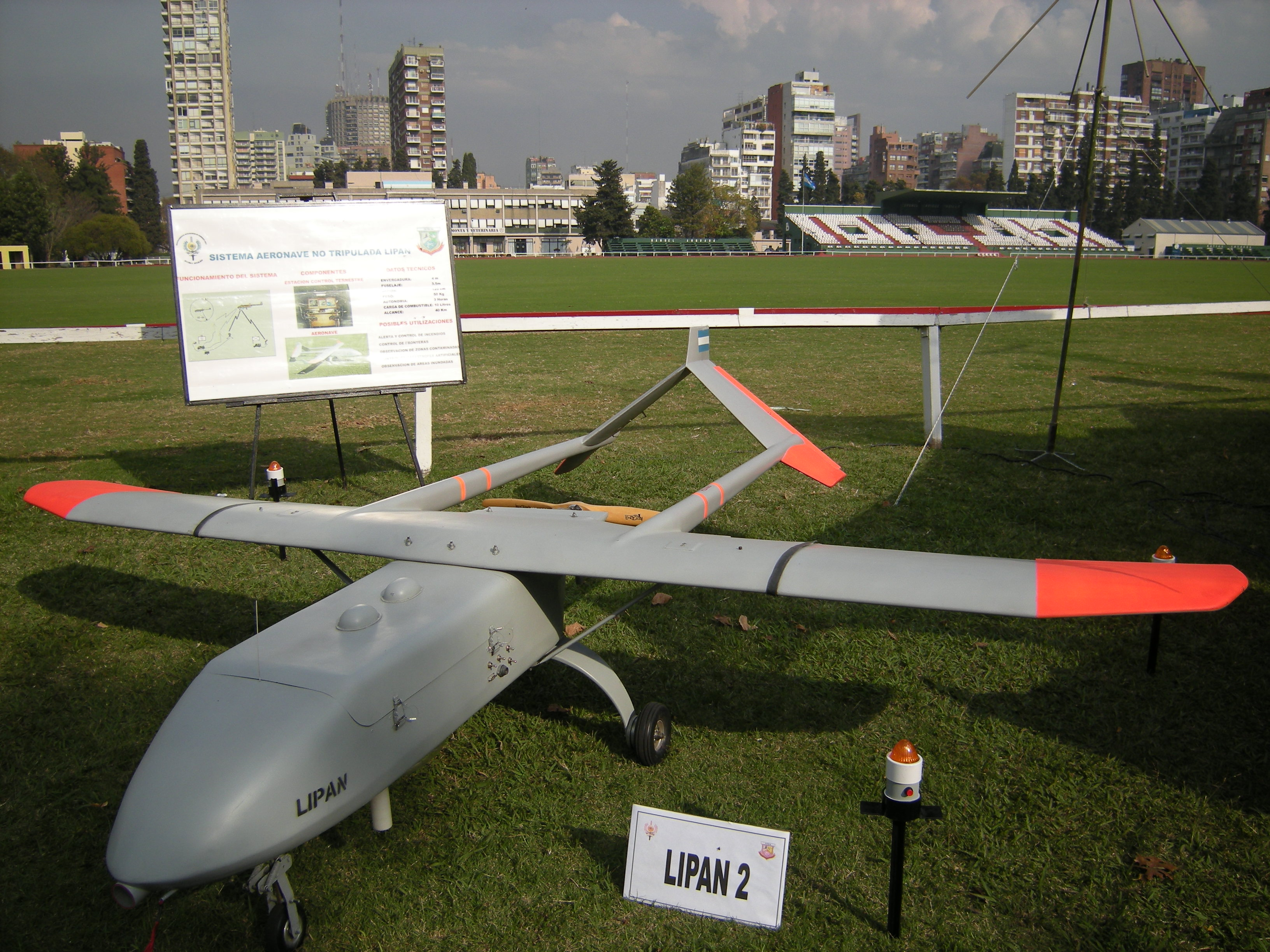

General information
- Type: Unmanned aerial vehicle
- National origin: Argentina

The Lipán M3 is a surveillance, reconnaissance and intelligence unmanned aerial vehicle (UAV) developed by Ejército Argentino (Argentine Army) since 1996. The Lipán M3 is also the first UAV developed in Latin America.

== Design and development ==
The Lipán M3 has a 4.6m wingspan, a length of 3.55m and a weight of 60 kg. It has a top speed of 170 km / h, and a range of 40 km with autonomy of 5 hours. It is able to carry up to 20 kg of payload and reach 2,000 m in height. It is able to take off remotely under a programmed route with up to 1,000 waypoints, enabling it to fly autonomously. It is equipped with cameras Varifocal and infrared vision system, which are multiplexed to leave the video transmitter and receiving station ground control images. These signals are received by a directional antenna oriented manually by the movement of the aircraft. Data and information on the geographical characteristics of the scanned areas and weather conditions can also be obtained. It also has signaling devices of high resolution video, telemetry and global positioning data.

The Center INTI -Electronics and Informatics and Argentine Army jointly developed software for automatic tracking antenna for unmanned aircraft Lipán. The M3 takes off and lands Lipán manually, and only self to maintain altitude and speed.

On July 10 of 2008 was held at the Army Aviation Airfield in Campo de Mayo, the first night flight of Lipán M3. The test was conducted by staff of the Department of Research, Development and Production and Combat Intelligence Detachment 601.

Since 2010 the Argentine Army has four Lipán M3.

== Possible future developments ==
The development of XM4 is underway, which is a more advanced variant of the Lipán M3. 6 units for experimentation in different geographic regions of Argentina have been made. This model has twice the autonomy of the Lipán M3, and is able to reach higher altitudes and has the ability to operate in fully automatic mode, landing and taking off as programmed.

The Argentina Navy is also working on the project Guardian, which is able to reach a speed of 120 km / h, a maximum height of 1,000 m with an operating range of 50 km. It is part of the first "Tactical Unmanned Air System". The first units have been designed during December 2007 to Combat Intelligence Detachment 601 of the Argentine Army.

== Operators ==
Egypt

- Egyptian Air Force
- Egyptian Army

Argentina

- Argentine Army

== Specifications (Lipán M3) ==
General characteristics

- Length: 3.55 m (11 ft 8 in)
- Wingspan: 4.6 m (15 ft 1 in)
- Max takeoff weight: 60 kg (132 lb)
- Propellers: 2-bladed

Performance

- Maximum speed: 170 km/h (110 mph, 92 kn)
- Range: 40 km (25 mi, 22 nmi)
- Endurance: 5
- Service ceiling: 2,000 m (6,600 ft)

== See also ==
Nostromo Yarará
