= FMK-3 submachine gun =

FMK-3
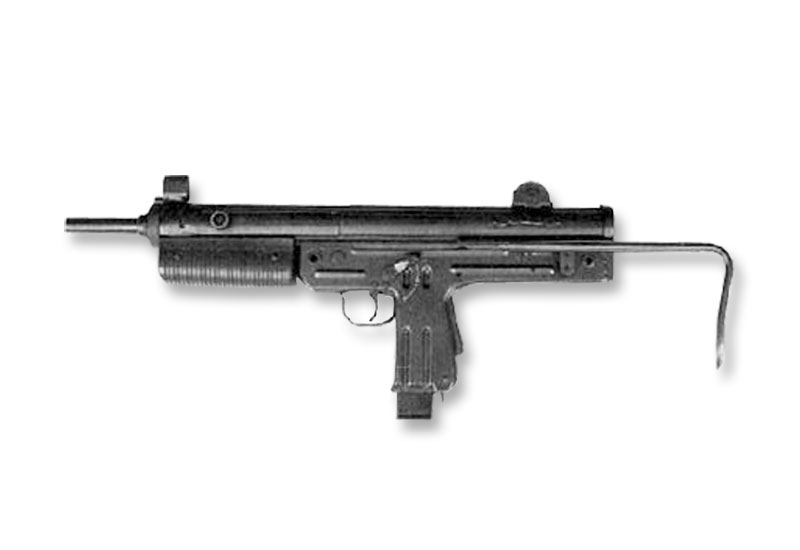
- Type: Submachine gun
- Place of origin: Argentina

Service history
- In service: 1974–present
- Used by: Argentina
- Wars: Argentine Dirty War; Croatian War of Independence; Falklands War; Guatemalan Civil War; Salvadoran Civil War

Production history
- Manufacturer: Fabricaciones Militares
- Produced: 1974–1993
- No. built: 85,000
- Variants: See Variants

Specifications
- Mass: 3.4 kg (7.5 lb) empty
- Length: 523 mm (20.6 in), stock folded 693 mm (27.3 in), stock extended
- Barrel length: 290 mm (11.4 in)
- Cartridge: 9×19mm Parabellum
- Action: Blowback, open bolt
- Rate of fire: 650 rounds/min
- Effective firing range: 100 m
- Feed system: 25, 32, and 40-round detachable box magazine
- Sights: Flip up iron sights

The FMK-3 is a selective fire blowback-operated submachine gun of Argentine origin designed by Fabricaciones Militares in 1974. Around 30,000 were produced for the Argentine military by 1991.

== Development ==
In the 1950s, the FMAP DM (Fábrica Militar de Armas Portables Domingo Matheu), belonging to the Dirección General de Fabricaciones Militares, acquired the production rights of a copy of the U.S. M3 A1 submachine gun, more commonly known as the "Grease Gun". This Argentinian version was chambered for 9×19mm cartridges, as opposed to the .45 ACP in the original model. The DGFM released two versions called PAM 1 and PAM 2, with and without a handle latch.

In the early 1970s, FMAP DM decided to change the design to use a telescoping bolt which allows a shorter weapon as well as a magazine in the pistol grip. This concept was designed by Jaroslav Holecek in mid-1946 and greatly reduced the size of the weapon. He popularized the Sa 23 and it was later adopted by the Israeli UZI, the Ingram MAC-10, and the Star Z-84. Thus, the PA-3 DM, later known as the FMK-3.

At first glance, the FMK-3 may be associated with the UZI. This Argentine sub-machine gun fires the 9×19mm Parabellum cartridge and hosts its magazine in the pistol grip, along with a fire selector and grip safety on the rear of the grip which must be squeezed in order to fire the weapon. Above the hand grip, is the upper receiver which houses the barrel, bolt, and recoil spring.

In the first series, the FMK was presented with three versions of stocks: one-piece plastic fixed, fixed to wood, and retractable wire. On the left side of the upper receiver is located the charging handle. This has a sliding dust cover that prevents the entry of foreign materials into the interior of the weapon. On the same side but at the rear is the sling holder. In early versions, the front one is similar to the Uzi, although it went on to be captive and rotating in the shield that holds the barrel to the receiver. On the receiver aiming devices are: a hooded front post sight and a rear L-shaped flip sight adjustable for windage and with 50 and 100-meters sight positions. It is all protected by side ears. The ejection window is small sized and is located to the right of the aforementioned drawer or upper receiver.

== Overview ==
The FMK-3 is chambered in 9×19mm Parabellum, with a rate of fire of 650 rounds per minute. 20-, 32-, and 40-round magazines are available for the FMK-3 as well as the adaption of a silencer and grenade-firing capability.

Unlike other similar submachine guns, the safety, the disconnect, and auto of sear the FMK-3 are located behind the handle. In this way, ahead of the trigger is only the selector mechanism of the shot and the manual safety. The safety selector has a wing-type lever that is activated from the left and presents three positions: upper intermediate, "S" (safe), "R" (repeat), and "A" (automatic fire).

As an additional security measure, the FMK-3 has a safety grip that acts in the following way: If the weapon is not correctly grasped, the safety locks the bolt. Thus, even if the gun is ready to fire, if not pressed, the bolt is blocked from closing and firing the weapon. In addition, as mentioned above, with the bolt at rest, an empty chamber and the full magazine the grip safety prevents accidental discharge of the weapon drag. Therefore, it is a very safe weapon to carry in any condition.

== Variants ==
=== FMK-3 ===
The main variant and the most produced variant. The FMK-3 has a retractable wire stock. Fixed stocks have been recently made that can be installed by two prongs. FMK-3s have also been adapted with Picatinny rails.

=== FMK-4 ===
FMK-3 with fixed stock. The fixed stock appears to be made from polymer, and is similar to that found on the H&K G3.

=== FMK-5 ===
The FMK-3 is also produced for the civilian market, in semi-automatic-only version as the FMK-5.

== Users ==
- Argentina: Used by Law enforcement in Argentina and the Argentine Army.
- Bolivia: Used by Bolivian Army.
- Croatia
- Guatemala: Used by the military.
- El Salvador: more than 600 FMK-3s received during the 1980s, used during the Salvadoran Civil War, and later put into storage. Used in the 2010s by private security guards.
- Uruguay: Used by Uruguayan Armed Forces and National Police of Uruguay.

== See also ==
- Uzi
- Vz. 23
