= Mathogo =

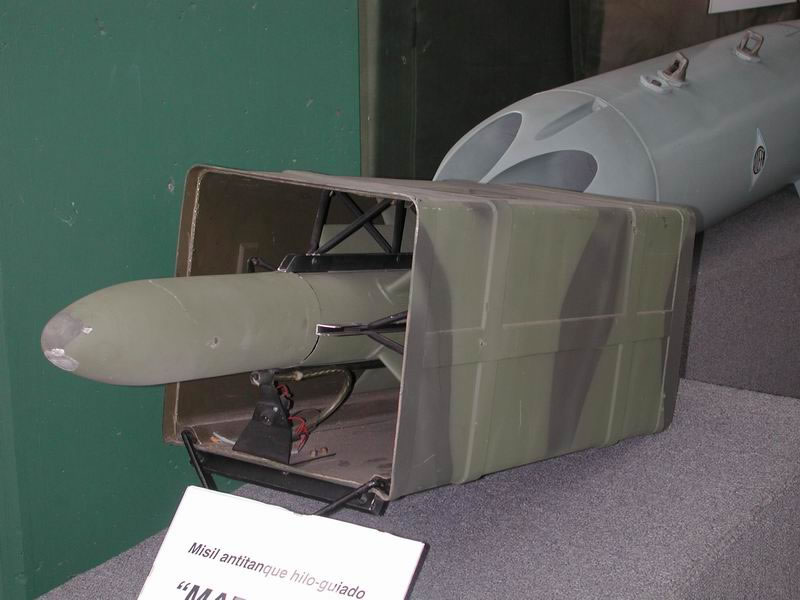
- A Mathogo missile and its launcher box
- Type: Anti-tank missile
- Place of origin: Argentina

Service history
- In service: 1978 - present

Production history
- Designed: 1970s
- Manufacturer: CITEFA

Specifications
- Mass: 11.3 kg (25 lb)
- Length: 0.998 m (3.27 ft)
- Diameter: 102 mm (4.0 in)
- Wingspan: 470 mm (19 in)
- Warhead: 2.8-kg HEAT warhead
- Engine: Two-stage solid fuel rocket
- Operational range: 400-3,000 m
- Maximum speed: 324 km/h (202 miles/hr)
- Guidance system: MCLOS with wing-edge spoilers
- Launch platform: vehicle, ground

The Mathogo (Acronym for Misil Anti-Tanque Hilo Guiado - English: Wire Guided Anti-Tank Missile) is an Argentine first-generation wire-guided anti-tank missile.

== Background ==
The anti-tank missiles (ATGW, anti-tank guided weapons) evolved in the late 1950s from the portable anti-tank rockets (ATR) like the bazooka, which required the operator to be close to the target, to overcome the limitations of these.

== History ==
The Mathogo was developed by CITEFA (Instituto de Investigaciones Científicas y Técnicas de las FFAA - the Armed Forces Scientific and Technical Research Institute) in the 1970s to supplement and eventually replace the Argentine 105-mm recoilless rifles. In design it is similar to the Swedish BANTAM by Bofors - which is reported to have been bought in limited numbers for the Argentine Marine Corps - only slightly larger and with a pointed nose section with the first versions. Some news report photo captions have even mistaken it for the BANTAM. Development was completed in the late 1970s and various reports have stated that it is no longer in production.

The Mathogo's warhead is capable of penetrating 400mm of rolled homogeneous armor.

The missile achieved operational status in 1978 and is in use by the Argentine Army. The missile has been approved for launch from the Agusta A109 helicopter, although the missile's accuracy reportedly suffers when used in this role.

== Variants ==
- Mathogo 1
- Mathogo 2 - improved warhead and higher speed

== Users ==
- Argentine Army

== See also ==
- List of anti-tank guided missiles

Related development

- CIBEL-2K
- MARA – (Argentina)

Similar weapons

- Cobra – (West Germany)
- Bantam – (Sweden)
- SS.10 – (France)
- ENTAC – (France)
- Vickers Vigilant – (United Kingdom)
