= Nostromo Yarará =

Argentinian tactical UAV

- VANT Nostromo Yarará

General information
- Type: Tactical UAV
- National origin: Argentina
- Manufacturer: Nostromo Defensa
- Designer: Marcelo Martínez
- Status: In service
- Primary users: US Department of Defense (US Southern Command)

History
- Introduction date: June 2006
- First flight

The Yarará project is the first unmanned aerial vehicle (UAV) programme in South America to be produced in series and for export. The system is developed by Nostromo Defensa for surveillance, border patrol and reconnaissance. It was unveiled at the Argentine Air Force Air Show (Fuerza Aérea Argentina, FAA) on 10 August 2006. The manufacturer says it has been produced in small series for export to an unidentified government customer in the United States.

== Design ==
The vehicle was named after the yarará, a South American venomous snake.

The Yarará was developed by Nostromo Defensa under contracts from the US Southern Command with a system comprising three aircraft delivered in June 2006.

Evolution of the design has seen an increase in the width of the undercarriage footprint to support rough field landings, while a Zenoah 6.5 hp engine is an option. The first powerplant is a Modellmotoren 3W 5.5 hp two stroke system.

The current Yarará is powered by a single Sonic 35 multifuel air-cooled wankel rotary engine which produces 5.9KW of output power. It is fitted with a three-bladed propeller at the rear of the fuselage section raised on an engine pylon with integral fuel tank. This engine is designed and built by British company Cubewano. It is the first kerosene-powered (heavy fuel) rotary engine flown on a UAV that can use JP8 as fuel. It was first flown in this configuration in August 2009.

The Wankel engine has electronic injection.

== Specifications ==
Data from 2009 Worldwide UAV Roundup Poster

General characteristics

- Capacity: 5 kg (11 lb) payload
- Length: 2.472 m (8 ft 1 in)
- Wingspan: 4 m (13 ft 1 in)
- Empty weight: 15.5 kg (34 lb)
- Max takeoff weight: 22.5 kg (50 lb)
- Propellers: 2-bladed fixed-pitch propeller

Performance

- Maximum speed: 145 km/h (90 mph, 78 kn)
- Cruise speed: 115 km/h (71 mph, 62 kn)
- Stall speed: 45 km/h (28 mph, 24 kn)
- Range: 50 km (31 mi, 27 nmi)
- Endurance: 6 hours
- Service ceiling: 3,500 m (11,500 ft)

== See also ==
- Lipán M3
- FMA IA X 59 Tábano
