= CEATSA =

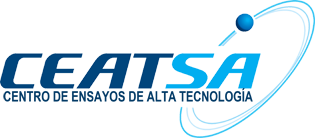

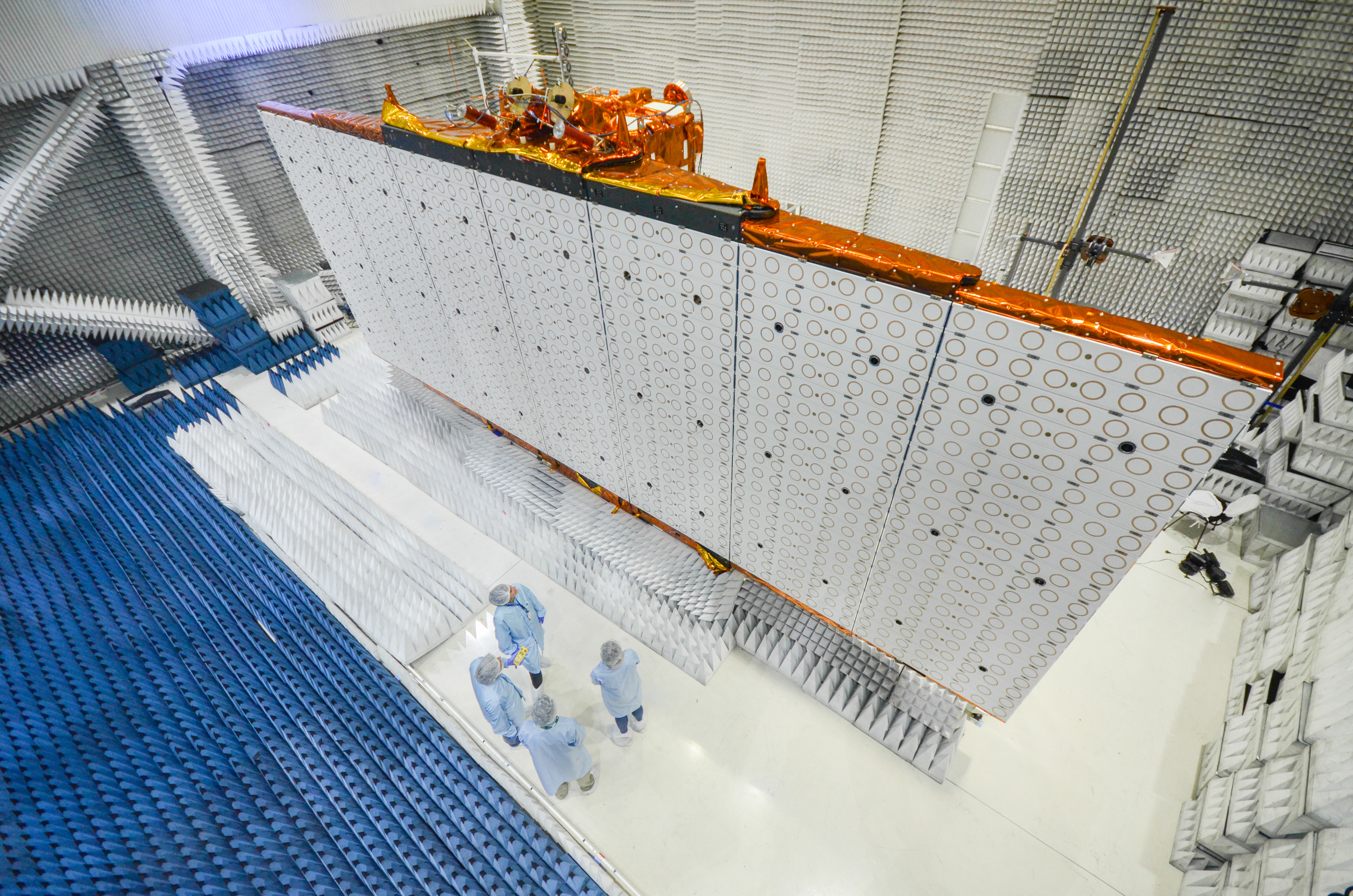
- SAOCOM 1A inside the facilities of CEATSA.
- Native name: Centro de Ensayos de Alta Tecnología Sociedad Anónima
- Company type: Sociedad Anónima
- Industry: Environmental testing; Satellite testing; Automobile testing
- Founded: September 2010 in Bariloche, Argentina
- Founder: INVAP and ARSAT
- Headquarters: Av. Cmte. Luis Piedrabuena 4950, San Carlos de Bariloche, Argentina
- Area served: South America
- Key people: Carlos Del Valle Campos (President); Federico Hernáez (Vice-President); Vicente Campenni (Director); Marcelo Famá (General Manager)
- Owners: ARSAT (80%) and INVAP (20%)
- Website: www.ceatsa.com.ar

CEATSA (Spanish: Centro de Ensayos de Alta Tecnología Sociedad Anónima), is an Argentine high technology testing company providing environmental testing services to the satellite, aeronautics, electronics, automotive, defense, and energy industries. It is jointly owned by the Argentine government owned telecommunications company ARSAT (80%) and public company INVAP (20%).

== History ==
It was created in September 2010, started its operations in December 2012 and the environmental testing facilities were officially inaugurated in September 2013, when ARSAT-1 did its whole testing cycle. Its creation enabled the country to cover the whole life cycle of satellite design and operation.

The creation of CEATSA enabled Argentina to cover the whole cycle of satellite design and manufacturing. Previously, national satellites like SAC-D had to be tested on the Brazilian INPE. This was expensive since the move of personnel and ground support equipment associated with a single satellite was significant. Since the Brazilian testing facilities were too small for the size of the ARSAT satellites, it simply made economic sense to actually build the facilities.

The actual investment on the company was of approximately 40 Million US dollars.

In August 2025, the company entered into liquidation and ceased providing its services.

== Testing Facilities ==
- Environmental testing chamber
- Shaker (vibration testing)
- Reverberant Test Chamber (acoustic environment testing)
- Mass properties testing equipment
- Near Field Horizontal Scanner
- Anechoic Chambers

== See also ==
- INVAP
- ARSAT
- ARSAT-1
- ARSAT-2
- ARSAT-3
