= Satellite surface salinity =

Measurements of surface salinity made by remote sensing satellites

Satellite surface salinity refers to measurements of surface salinity made by remote sensing satellites. The radiative properties of the ocean surface are exploited in order to estimate the salinity of the water's surface layer.

The depth of the water column that a satellite surface salinity measurement is sensitive to depends on the frequency (or wavelength) of the radiance that is being measured. For instance, the optical depth for seawater at the 1.413 GHz microwave frequency, used for the Aquarius mission, is about 1–2 cm.

== Background ==
As with many passive remote sensing satellite products, satellites measure surface salinity by initially taking radiance measurements emitted by the Earth's atmosphere and ocean. If the object emitting the measured radiance is considered to be a black body, then the relationship between the object's temperature and the measured radiance can be related, at a given frequency, through the Planck function (or Planck's law).

$$I_\nu = \frac{2 h\nu^{3}}{c^2}\frac{1}{e^{\frac{h\nu}{kT}}-1}$$

where

$I_\nu$ (the Intensity or Brightness) is the amount of energy emitted per unit surface per unit time per unit solid angle and in the frequency range between $\nu$ and $\nu + d\nu$; $T$ is the temperature of the black body; $h$ is the Planck constant; $\nu$ is frequency; $c$ is the speed of light; and $k$ is the Boltzmann constant.

This equation can be rewritten to express the temperature, T, in terms of the measured radiance at a particular frequency. The temperature derived from the Planck function is referred to as the brightness temperature (which see, for derivation).

For ideal black bodies, the brightness temperature is also the directly measurable temperature. For objects in nature, often called Gray Bodies, the actual temperature is only a fraction of the brightness temperature. The fraction of brightness temperature to actual temperature is defined as the emissivity. The relationship between brightness temperature and temperature can be written as:

$$T_\text{b} = e T$$

where T_{b} is the brightness temperature, e is the emissivity, and T is the temperature of the surface sea water. The emissivity describes the ability of an object to emit energy by radiation. Several factors can affect the emissivity of water, including temperature, emission angle, wavelength, and chemical composition. The emissivity of sea water has been modeled as a function of its temperature, salinity, and radiant energy frequency.

== Measurement technique ==
Studies have shown that measurements of seawater brightness temperature at the 1.413 GHz (L-band) are sufficient to make reasonably accurate measurements of seawater surface salinity. The emissivity of seawater can be described in terms of its polarized components of emissivity as:

$$e_H  = 1 - \left [ \frac{\cos \theta - ( \epsilon - \sin ^2 \theta )^{ \frac{1}{2}}}{ \cos \theta + ( \epsilon - \sin ^2 \theta )^{ \frac{1}{2}}} \right]^2$$
$$e_V  = 1 - \left [ \frac{\epsilon \cos \theta - ( \epsilon - \sin ^2 \theta )^{ \frac{1}{2}}}{ \epsilon \cos \theta + ( \epsilon - \sin ^2 \theta )^{ \frac{1}{2}}} \right]^2$$

The above equations are governed by the Fresnel equations, the instrument viewing angle from nadir θ, and the dielectric coefficient ε. Microwave radiometers can be further equipped to measure the vertical and horizontal components of the surface seawater's brightness temperature, which relates to the horizontal and vertical components of the emissivity as:

$$T_\text{bH} = e_\text{H} T$$
$$T_\text{bV} = e_\text{V} T$$,

where $T_\text{b}$ refers to the brightness temperature and $T$ is simply the temperature of the surface seawater. Since the viewing angle from nadir is typically set by the remote sensing instrument, measurements of the polarized components of the brightness temperature can be related to the surface seawater's temperature and dielectric coefficient.

Several models have been proposed to estimate the dielectric constant of sea water given its salinity and temperature. The "Klein and Swift" dielectric model function is a common and well-tested model used to compute the dielectric coefficient of seawater at a given salinity, temperature, and frequency. The Klein and Swift model is based on the Debye equation and fitted with laboratory measurements of the dielectric coefficient. Using this model, if the temperature of the seawater is known from external sources, then measurements of the brightness temperature can be used to compute the salinity of surface seawater directly. Figure 1 shows an example of the brightness temperature curves associated with sea surface salinity, as a function of sea surface temperature.

When looking at the polarized components of the brightness temperature, the spread of the brightness temperature curves will be different depending on the component. The vertical component of the brightness temperature shows a greater spread in constant salinity curves than the horizontal component. This implies a greater sensitivity to salinity in the vertical component of brightness temperature than in the horizontal.

== Sources of measurement error ==
There are many sources of error associated with measurements of sea surface salinity:

- Radiometer
- Antenna
- System pointing
- Roughness (of sea surface)
- Solar
- Galactic
- Rain (total liquid water)
- Ionosphere
- Atmosphere(other)
- Sea surface temperature
- Antenna gain near land and ice
- Model function

Most of the error sources on the previous list stem from either standard instrument errors (Antenna, System Pointing, etc.) or noise from external sources measurement signal (Solar, Galactic, etc.). However, the largest error source comes from the effect of ocean surface roughness. A rough ocean surface tends to cause an increase in the measured brightness temperature as a result of multiple scattering and shadowing effects. Quantifying the influence of ocean roughness to the measured temperature brightness is crucial to make an accurate measurement. Some instruments use radar scatterometers to measure the surface roughness to account for this source of error.

== List of satellite instruments measuring sea surface salinity ==
- Soil Moisture and Ocean Salinity satellite
- Aquarius (SAC-D instrument)
