= GE2 =

GE2, GE 2, G.E.2, GE-2 or variants thereof, may refer to:

- Grave Encounters 2, 2012 North American horror film
- Bristol G.E.2, British pre-World War I military aeroplane
- 7343 Ockeghem or 1992 GE2, an asteroid that was the 7343rd discovered, and named "Ockeghem"
- AMC-2 (satellite) or GE-2, a communications satellite launched in 1997
- God Eater 2, a Japanese videogame released in 2013 by Namco Bandai
- Mazda MX-6 model from 1995 to 1997
- GE BWR GE-2, nuclear reactor design by General Electric
- Paraplane GE-2 Golden Eagle, an American powered parachute design
