= Nahuel 1A =

Argentine communications satellite

- Mission type: Communication
- Operator: Nahuelsat; AR-SAT (since 2006)
- COSPAR ID: 1997-002B
- SATCAT no.: 24714

Spacecraft properties
- Bus: Spacebus 2000NG
- Manufacturer: Dornier Satellitensysteme (prime); Aérospatiale (bus)
- Launch mass: 1,790 kg (3,950 lb)
- Dry mass: 828 kg (1,825 lb)
- Power: 2700 Watts

Start of mission
- Launch date: 22:04, January 30, 1997 (UTC)
- Rocket: Ariane 44L
- Launch site: Guiana Space Centre ELA-2
- Contractor: Arianespace

End of mission
- Disposal: Placed on a graveyard orbit
- Deactivated: June 7th, 2010

Orbital parameters
- Regime: GSO
- Longitude: 71.8° W

Transponders
- Band: 18 K_{u} band transponders covering Latin America and U.S.

Nahuel 1A was a Spacebus 2000NG satellite manufactured Dornier Satellitensysteme as prime contractor with Aérospatiale of Cannes-Mandelieu supplying the bus. It was launched on January 30, 1997 by an Ariane 44L launcher along companion GE-2. The satellite was located in the 71.8 degrees West slot. It was operated by Nahuelsat S.A., the first satellite operator of Argentina from its ground station in Benavidez, province of Buenos Aires. It was transferred in 2006 ARSAT S.A., along all other Nahuelsat S.A. assets. Satellite mass was 1,790 kg (3,950 lb) wet, 828 kg (1,825 lb) dry with a nominal lifetime of 12.33 years. It had eighteen 54 MHz transponders implemented with 55W TWTAs in three K_{u} band and extended K_{u} band coverages. Thus, it had 27 transponder equivalent or 972 MHz of K_{u} Band bandwidth.

It was successfully reorbited in June 2010, when most of the on-board propellant depleted, using the remaining propellant and blowdown helium still stored in the propellant tanks.

== History ==
In the early 1990s, the Argentine government gave the monopoly for K_{u} band satellite broadcasting to Nahuelsat S.A. a consortium of European companies. The company had the obligation of placing a communications satellite on the geosynchronous orbit slot 71.8 West, the only one assigned to the country by ITU to keep the slot rights before they lapsed. The company leased two satellites (Anik C1 and later Anik C2) to hold the orbital rights. In the meantime, they ordered a satellite, plus a backup, and a ground station from Dornier Satellitensysteme, which acted as program prime.

The satellite itself, Nahuel 1A, was contracted to Aérospatiale which acted as satellite prime contractor. It was based on the Spacebus 2000NG satellite bus. The main difference between the stock Spacebus 2000 and the Spacebus NG was the replacement of the 8-bit 1802 processor that powered the ADCE (Attitude Determination and Control Electronics) with a 16-bit 1750A processor. This allowed to do a full software implementation of the control algorithms.

The insurance company had required that a second satellite be built in case of a launch failure of the main satellite. For this reason, Nahuel 1B, a clone of the Nahuel 1A was built as backup. The primary satellite was successfully launched on 22:04, January 30, 1997 (UTC) from the Guiana Space Centre ELA-2 aboard the Ariane 44L V96. It flew with a companion satellite, GE-2. Since the primary satellite launch was successful, the backup satellite was sold to GE Americom and flew as GE-5.

Between 1998 and 2000, a failure mode on the Kalrez seals of the S10-13 thrusters was discovered and analyzed. In May 2000 the failure mode and a recommendation to limit any operation to less than 0.7 m/s (2.3 ft/s) (later reviewed to 1.0 m/s (3.3 ft/s)) was communicated to existing users. The Nahuel 1A had twelve such thrusters in two redundant strings (2A to 7A and 2B to 7B). On April 5, 2001 the 7B showed the first failure (excessive chamber temperature due to oxidizer rich combustion). On May 14, 2004 7A started behaving anomaly (partial blockage). Thus, the use of 7 was reduced and both 2/3 pair were used.

On September 21, 2004, 7B started showing low chamber pressure, which was explained by an oxidizer leak. Between October 26 and 29, 2004, 2BA started showing anomalies. After some investigation on its performance, it was discovered that it was damaged since 2004. This required a reduction on the North-South stationkeeping. On February 4, 2006 thruster 4A failed and on June 27, 2007 thruster 7B failed beyond what was reasonable to use.

At the same time, all assets of Nahuelsat S.A. were being transferred to the newly formed ARSAT S.A. By 2006, Nahuelsat had failed to put a satellite in its second assigned position, 81° West, and had not even ordered a replacement for Nahuel 1A. So the Argentine Government created ARSAT which accepted to assume all Nahuelsat obligations in exchange for all assets of the company. It then ordered the ARSAT-1 and ARSAT-2 from the local INVAP to cover both orbital slots.

But Nahuel 1A was barely maneuverable within the specified orbital envelope and its transponders were fully subscribe. Luckily, AMC-6 was just 0.2° away and the customers were transferred while the ground operators resorted to manual operations and creative thinking to keep servicing the customers until the transition was performed. By August 23, 2007 the last inclination correction was performed and the satellite was allowed to drift to an inclined orbit. The satellite was kept transmitting to protect the slot rights.

On December 7, 2007 2B started misbehaving, and plans for transferring the satellite to a graveyard orbit were drawn. But after a few maneuvers 2B performance stabilized near 98% and the operations were resumed. Since October 1, 2009 3B started performing erratically and reaching inefficiencies as low as 70%, but eventually it stabilized at 90%.

During early 2010, ARSAT decided to transfer the satellite to the 81° West slot, to protect the orbital rights. The state of the satellite was poor, but a slow transfer plan was developed. The process started on April 5 using only 4B+5B pair, the only that still worked perfectly. The maneuver transited very close to other satellites and it even required a small correction on May 26 to keep the separation with another satellite at acceptable levels. The operation showed that 5B had been degraded.

On June 7, 2010, the satellite reached the 81° West slot. But when the first maneuver was performed, thruster 3B was discovered as failed beyond usefulness. As was requested by management, a previously drawn plan using only 4B+5B to send the satellite to a graveyard orbit was put in action. Using mostly the trapped helium and propellant residuals, it successfully put the bird on a 250 km (130 nmi) orbit above GSO and Nahuel 1A was switched off.

While the satellite had anomalies and the last years were difficult, it had an actual life of 13.5 years, for a 12.33 years of design time. It helped train an Argentine ground controller force, that would be fundamental in the operation of the ARSAT-1 and following models.

== See also ==
- ARSAT-1
- ARSAT-2
- ARSAT-3
