= Intensification =

Intensification may refer to:

- Image intensification by image intensifier
- Rapid intensification, a meteorological condition that occurs when a tropical cyclone intensifies dramatically in a short period of time
- Sustainable intensification in intensive farming
- Urban intensification, a concept in urban density
- Water cycle intensification, a development taking place due to climate change
- Intensifier, in linguistics, a lexical category
