= Effects of climate change on the water cycle =

Climate change influence on water cycle

Extreme weather (heavy rains, droughts, heat waves) is one consequence of a changing water cycle due to global warming. These events will become more and more common as the Earth warms.

The effects of climate change on the water cycle are profound and have been described as an intensification or a strengthening of the water cycle (also called the hydrologic cycle). This effect has been observed since at least 1980. One example is when heavy rain events become even stronger. The effects of climate change on the water cycle have important negative effects on the availability of freshwater resources, as well as other water reservoirs such as oceans, ice sheets, the atmosphere, and soil moisture. The water cycle is essential to life on Earth and plays a large role in the global climate system and ocean circulation. The warming of our planet is expected to be accompanied by changes in the water cycle for various reasons. For example, a warmer atmosphere can contain more water vapor which has effects on evaporation and rainfall.

The underlying cause of the intensifying water cycle is the increased amount of greenhouse gases (GHGs) in the atmosphere, which lead to a warmer atmosphere through the greenhouse effect. Fundamental laws of physics explain how the saturation vapor pressure in the atmosphere increases by 7% when temperature rises by 1 °C. This relationship is known as the Clausius-Clapeyron equation.

The strength of the water cycle and its changes over time are of considerable interest, especially as the climate changes. The hydrological cycle is a system whereby the evaporation of moisture in one place leads to precipitation (rain or snow) in another place. For example, evaporation always exceeds precipitation over the oceans. This allows moisture to be transported by the atmosphere from the oceans onto land where precipitation exceeds evapotranspiration. The runoff from the land flows into streams and rivers and discharges into the ocean, which completes the global cycle. The water cycle is a key part of Earth's energy cycle through the evaporative cooling at the surface which provides latent heat to the atmosphere, as atmospheric systems play a primary role in moving heat upward.

The availability of water plays a major role in determining where the extra heat goes. It can go either into evaporation or into an increase in air temperature. If water is available (like over the oceans and the tropics), extra heat goes mostly into evaporation. If water is not available (like over dry areas on land), the extra heat goes into raising air temperature. Also, the water-holding capacity of the atmosphere increases proportionally with temperature increase. For these reasons, the temperature increases dominate in the Arctic (polar amplification) and on land but not over the oceans and the tropics.

Several inherent characteristics have the potential to cause sudden (abrupt) changes in the water cycle. However, the likelihood that such changes will occur during the 21st century is currently regarded as low.

== Overview ==
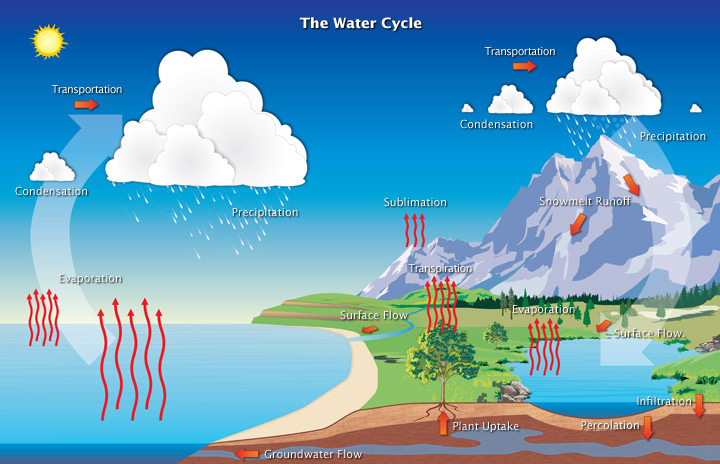
The water cycle

The amount of water vapor in Earth's atmosphere has risen over recent decades with global warming, making heavy rainfall events more severe.

Heating of the Earth leads to more energy cycling within its climate system, causing changes to the global water cycle. These include first and foremost an increased water vapor pressure in the atmosphere. This phenomenon causes changes in precipitation patterns with regards to frequency and intensity, as well as changes in groundwater and soil moisture. Taken together, these changes are often referred to as an "intensification and acceleration" of the water cycle. Key processes that will also be affected are droughts and floods, tropical cyclones, glacier retreat, snow cover, ice jam floods and extreme weather events.

The increasing amount of GHGs in the atmosphere leads to extra heating of the lower atmosphere, also known as the troposphere. The saturation vapor pressure of air rises along with its temperature, which means that warmer air can contain more water vapor. Transfers of heat to land, ocean, and ice surfaces additionally promote more evaporation. The greater amount of water in the troposphere then increases the chances for more intense rainfall events.

This relation between temperature and saturation vapor pressure is described in the Clausius–Clapeyron equation, which states that saturation pressure will increase by 7% when temperature rises by 1 °C. This is visible in measurements of the tropospheric water vapor, which are provided by satellites, radiosondes, and surface stations. The IPCC AR5 concludes that tropospheric water vapor has increased by 3.5% over the last 40 years, which is consistent with the observed temperature increase of 0.5 °C.

The human influence on the water cycle can be observed by analyzing the ocean's surface salinity and the "precipitation minus evaporation (P–E)" patterns over the ocean. Both are elevated. Research published in 2012 based on surface ocean salinity over the period 1950 to 2000 confirms this projection of an intensified global water cycle with salty areas becoming more saline and fresher areas becoming more fresh over the period. IPCC indicates there is high confidence that heavy precipitation events associated with both tropical and extratropical cyclones, and atmospheric moisture transport and heavy precipitation events will intensify.

=== Intermittency in precipitation ===
Climate models do not simulate the water cycle very well. One reason is that precipitation is a difficult quantity to deal with because it is inherently intermittent. Often, only the average amount is considered. People tend to use the term "precipitation" as if it was the same as "precipitation amount". What actually matters when describing changes to Earth's precipitation patterns is more than just the total amount: it is also about the intensity (how hard it rains or snows), frequency (how often), duration (how long), and type (whether rain or snow). Scientists have researched the characteristics of precipitation and found that it is the frequency and intensity that matter for extremes, and those are difficult to calculate in climate models.

== Observations and predictions ==
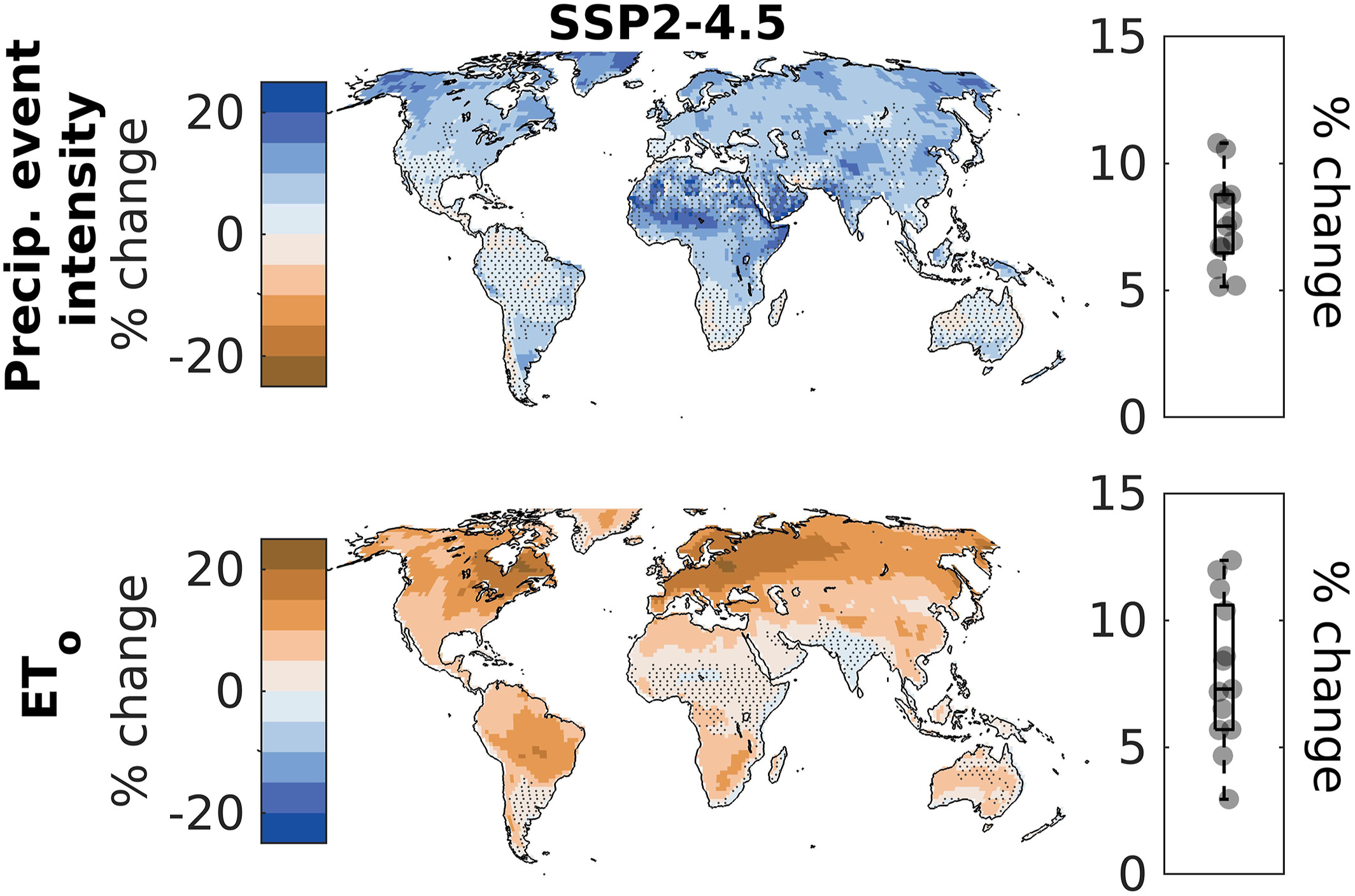
Predicted changes in precipitation event intensity and evapotranspiration under the SSP2-4.5 scenario.

Since the middle of the 20th century, human-caused climate change has included observable changes in the global water cycle. The IPCC Sixth Assessment Report in 2021 predicted that these changes will continue to grow significantly at the global and regional level.

The report also found that: Precipitation over land has increased since 1950, and the rate of increase has become faster since the 1980s and in higher latitudes. Water vapour in the atmosphere (in particular the troposphere) has increased since at least the 1980s. It is expected that over the course of the 21st century, the annual global precipitation over land will increase due to a higher global surface temperature.

A warming climate makes extremely wet and very dry occurrences more severe. There can also be changes in atmospheric circulation patterns. This will affect the regions and frequency for these extremes to occur. In most parts of the world and under all climate change scenarios, water cycle variability and accompanying extremes are anticipated to rise more quickly than the changes of average values.

In 2024 the World Meteorological Organization published a report saying that climate change had severely destabilized water cycle during the year 2023, causing both stronger rainfall and stronger drought. The world's rivers had their driest year in at least 30 years and many of the world's major river basins were drying up like the basins of the Mississippi, Amazon, Ganges, Brahmaputra, and Mekong. For 3 years in a row, more than 50% of global catchment areas had lower than normal river discharges. Glaciers lost more than 600 gigatons of water – the biggest water loss in the last 50 years. It was the second year in a row in which all glaciated regions had ice loss.

=== Changes to regional weather patterns ===
Predicted changes in average soil moisture for a scenario of 2°C global warming. This can disrupt agriculture and ecosystems. A reduction in soil moisture by one standard deviation means that average soil moisture will approximately match the ninth driest year between 1850 and 1900 at that location.

Regional weather patterns across the globe are also changing as a result of tropical ocean warming. The Indo-Pacific warm pool has been warming rapidly and expanding during the recent decades, largely in response to increased carbon emissions from fossil fuel burning. The warm pool expanded to almost double its size, from an area of 22 million km^{2} during 1900–1980, to an area of 40 million km^{2} during 1981–2018. This expansion of the warm pool has altered global rainfall patterns, by changing the life cycle of the Madden Julian Oscillation (MJO), which is the most dominant mode of weather fluctuation originating in the tropics.

=== Potential for abrupt change ===
Several characteristics of the water cycle have the potential to cause sudden (abrupt) changes of the water cycle. The definition for "abrupt change" is: a regional to global scale change in the climate system that happens more quickly than it has in the past, indicating that the climate response is not linear. There may be "rapid transitions between wet and dry states" as a result of non-linear interactions between the ocean, atmosphere, and land surface.

For example, a collapse of the Atlantic meridional overturning circulation (AMOC), if it did occur, could have large regional impacts on the water cycle. The initiation or termination of solar radiation modification could also result in abrupt changes in the water cycle.There could also be abrupt water cycle responses to changes in the land surface: Amazon deforestation and drying, greening of the Sahara and the Sahel, amplification of drought by dust are all processes which could contribute.

The scientific understanding of the likelihood of such abrupt changes to the water cycle is not yet clear. Sudden changes in the water cycle due to human activity are a possibility that cannot be ruled out, with current scientific knowledge. However, the likelihood that such changes will occur during the 21st century is currently regarded as low.

== Measurement and modelling techniques ==
=== Changes in ocean salinity ===
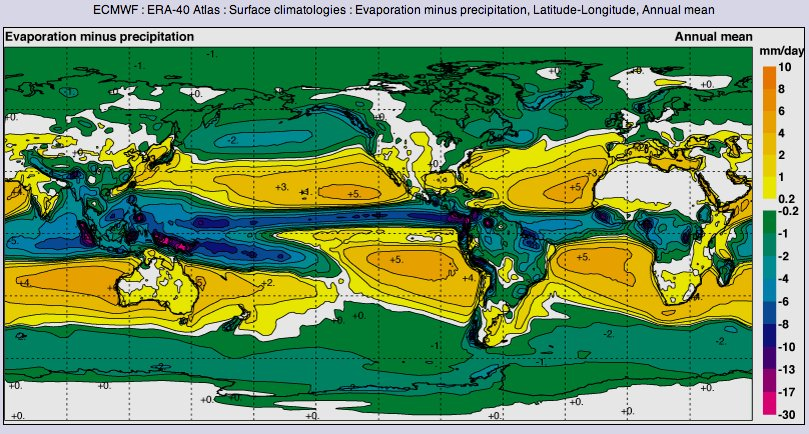
The yearly average distribution of precipitation minus evaporation. The image shows how the region around the equator is dominated by precipitation, and the subtropics are mainly dominated by evaporation.

Due to global warming and increased glacier melt, thermohaline circulation patterns may be altered by increasing amounts of freshwater released into oceans and, therefore, changing ocean salinity. Thermohaline circulation is responsible for bringing up cold, nutrient-rich water from the depths of the ocean, a process known as upwelling.

Seawater consists of fresh water and salt, and the concentration of salt in seawater is called salinity. Salt does not evaporate, thus the precipitation and evaporation of freshwater influences salinity strongly. Changes in the water cycle are therefore strongly visible in surface salinity measurements, which has already been known since the 1930s.

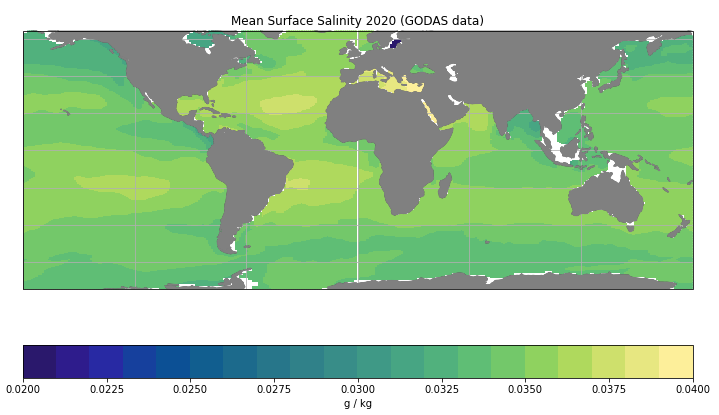
The global pattern of the oceanic surface salinity. It can be seen how the by evaporation dominated subtropics are relatively saline. The tropics and higher latitudes are less saline. When comparing with the map above it can be seen how the high salinity regions match the by evaporation dominated areas, and the lower salinity regions match the by precipitation dominated areas.

The advantage of using surface salinity is that it is well documented in the last 50 years, for example with in-situ measurement systems as ARGO. Another advantage is that oceanic salinity is stable on very long time scales, which makes small changes due to anthropogenic forcing easier to track. The oceanic salinity is not homogeneously distributed over the globe, there are regional differences that show a clear pattern. The tropic regions are relatively fresh, since these regions are dominated by rainfall. The subtropics are more saline, since these are dominated by evaporation, these regions are also known as the 'desert latitudes'. The latitudes close to the polar regions are then again less saline, with the lowest salinity values found in these regions. This is because there is a low amount of evaporation in this region, and a high amount of fresh meltwater entering the Arctic Ocean.

The long-term observation records show a clear trend: the global salinity patterns are amplifying in this period. This means that the high saline regions have become more saline, and regions of low salinity have become less saline. The regions of high salinity are dominated by evaporation, and the increase in salinity shows that evaporation is increasing even more. The same goes for regions of low salinity that are become less saline, which indicates that precipitation is intensifying only more. This spatial pattern is similar to the spatial pattern of evaporation minus precipitation. The amplification of the salinity patterns is therefore indirect evidence for an intensifying water cycle.

To further investigate the relation between ocean salinity and the water cycle, models play a large role in current research. General Circulation Models (GCMs) and more recently Atmosphere-Ocean General Circulation Models (AOGCMs) simulate the global circulations and the effects of changes such as an intensifying water cycle. The outcome of multiple studies based on such models support the relationship between surface salinity changes and the amplifying precipitation minus evaporation patterns.

A metric to capture the difference in salinity between high and low salinity regions in the top 2000 meters of the ocean is captured in the SC2000 metric. The observed increase of this metric is 5.2% (±0.6%) from 1960 to 2017. But this trend is accelerating, as it increased 1.9% (±0.6%) from 1960 to 1990, and 3.3% (±0.4%) from 1991 to 2017. Amplification of the pattern is weaker below the surface. This is because ocean warming increases near-surface stratification, subsurface layer is still in equilibrium with the colder climate. This causes the surface amplification to be stronger than older models predicted.

An instrument carried by the SAC-D satellite Aquarius, launched in June 2011, measured global sea surface salinity.

Between 1994 and 2006, satellite observations showed an 18% increase in the flow of freshwater into the world's oceans, partly from melting ice sheets, especially Greenland and partly from increased precipitation driven by an increase in global ocean evaporation.

==== Salinity evidence for changes in the water cycle ====
Essential processes of the water cycle are precipitation and evaporation. The local amount of precipitation minus evaporation (often noted as P-E) shows the local influence of the water cycle. Changes in the magnitude of P-E are often used to show changes in the water cycle. But robust conclusions about changes in the amount of precipitation and evaporation are complex. About 85% of the earth's evaporation and 78% of the precipitation happens over the ocean surface, where measurements are difficult. Precipitation on the one hand, only has long term accurate observation records over land surfaces where the amount of rainfall can be measured locally (called in-situ). Evaporation on the other hand, has no long time accurate observation records at all. This prohibits confident conclusions about changes since the industrial revolution. The AR5 (Fifth Assessment Report) of the IPCC creates an overview of the available literature on a topic, and labels the topic then on scientific understanding. They assign only low confidence to precipitation changes before 1951, and medium confidence after 1951, because of the scarcity of data. These changes are attributed to human influence, but only with medium confidence as well. There have been limited changes in regional monsoon precipitation observed over the 20th century because increases caused by global warming have been neutralized by cooling effects of anthropogenic aerosols. Different regional climate models project changes in monsoon precipitation whereby more regions are projected with increases than those with decreases.

=== Convection-permitting models to predict weather extremes ===
The representation of convection in climate models has so far restricted the ability of scientists to accurately simulate African weather extremes, limiting climate change predictions. Convection-permitting models (CPMs) are able to better simulate the diurnal cycle of tropical convection, the vertical cloud structure and the coupling between moist convection and convergence and soil moisture-convection feedbacks in the Sahel. The benefits of CPMs have also been demonstrated in other regions, including a more realistic representation of the precipitation structure and extremes. A convection-permitting (4.5 km grid-spacing) model over an Africa-wide domain shows future increases in dry spell length during the wet season over western and central Africa. The scientists concludes that, with the more accurate representation of convection, projected changes in both wet and dry extremes over Africa may be more severe. In other words: "both ends of Africa's weather extremes will get more severe".

== Impacts on water management aspects ==
The human-caused changes to the water cycle will increase hydrologic variability and therefore have a profound impact on the water sector and investment decisions. They will affect water availability (water resources), water supply, water demand, water security and water allocation at regional, basin, and local levels.

=== Water security ===
Impacts of climate change that are tied to water, affect people's water security on a daily basis. They include more frequent and intense heavy precipitation which affects the frequency, size and timing of floods. Also droughts can alter the total amount of freshwater and cause a decline in groundwater storage, and reduction in groundwater recharge. Reduction in water quality due to extreme events can also occur.^{: 558} Faster melting of glaciers can also occur.

Global climate change will probably make it more complex and expensive to ensure water security. It creates new threats and adaptation challenges. This is because climate change leads to increased hydrological variability and extremes. Climate change has many impacts on the water cycle. These result in higher climatic and hydrological variability, which can threaten water security. Changes in the water cycle threaten existing and future water infrastructure. It will be harder to plan investments for future water infrastructure as there are so many uncertainties about future variability for the water cycle. This makes societies more exposed to risks of extreme events linked to water and therefore reduces water security.

=== Water scarcity ===
Climate change could have a big impact on water resources around the world because of the close connections between the climate and hydrological cycle. Rising temperatures will increase evaporation and lead to increases in precipitation. However there will be regional variations in rainfall. Both droughts and floods may become more frequent and more severe in different regions at different times. There will be generally less snowfall and more rainfall in a warmer climate. Changes in snowfall and snow melt in mountainous areas will also take place. Higher temperatures will also affect water quality in ways that scientists do not fully understand. Possible impacts include increased eutrophication. Climate change could also boost demand for irrigation systems in agriculture. There is now ample evidence that greater hydrologic variability and climate change have had a profound impact on the water sector, and will continue to do so. This will show up in the hydrologic cycle, water availability, water demand, and water allocation at the global, regional, basin, and local levels.

The United Nations' FAO states that by 2025 1.9 billion people will live in countries or regions with absolute water scarcity. It says two thirds of the world's population could be under stress conditions. The World Bank says that climate change could profoundly alter future patterns of water availability and use. This will make water stress and insecurity worse, at the global level and in sectors that depend on water.

==== Droughts ====
Climate change affects many factors associated with droughts. These include how much rain falls and how fast the rain evaporates again. Warming over land increases the severity and frequency of droughts around much of the world. In some tropical and subtropical regions of the world, there will probably be less rain due to global warming. This will make them more prone to drought. Droughts are set to worsen in many regions of the world. These include Central America, the Amazon and south-western South America. They also include West and Southern Africa. The Mediterranean and south-western Australia are also some of these regions.

Higher temperatures increase evaporation. This dries the soil and increases plant stress. Agriculture suffers as a result. This means even regions where overall rainfall is expected to remain relatively stable will experience these impacts. These regions include central and northern Europe. Without climate change mitigation, around one third of land areas are likely to experience moderate or more severe drought by 2100. Due to global warming droughts are more frequent and intense than in the past.

Several social factors may worsen the impact of droughts. These are increased water demand, population growth and urban expansion in many areas. Land restoration techniques, such as agroforestry, can help reduce the impact of droughts.

==== Desertification ====
Research into desertification is complex, and there is no single metric which can define all aspects. However, more intense climate change is still expected to increase the current extent of drylands on the Earth's continents: from 38% in late 20th century to 50% or 56% by the end of the century, under the "moderate" and high-warming Representative Concentration Pathways 4.5 and 8.5. Most of the expansion will be seen over regions such as "southwest North America, the northern fringe of Africa, southern Africa, and Australia".

Drylands cover 41% of the earth's land surface and include 45% of the world's agricultural land. These regions are among the most vulnerable ecosystems to anthropogenic climate and land use change and are under threat of desertification. An observation-based attribution study of desertification was carried out in 2020 which accounted for climate change, climate variability, CO_{2} fertilization as well as both the gradual and rapid ecosystem changes caused by land use. The study found that, between 1982 and 2015, 6% of the world's drylands underwent desertification driven by unsustainable land use practices compounded by anthropogenic climate change. Despite an average global greening, anthropogenic climate change has degraded 12.6% (5.43 million km^{2}) of drylands, contributing to desertification and affecting 213 million people, 93% of who live in developing economies.

=== Floods ===
Due to an increase in heavy rainfall events, floods are likely to become more severe when they do occur. The interactions between rainfall and flooding are complex. There are some regions in which flooding is expected to become rarer. This depends on several factors. These include changes in rain and snowmelt, but also soil moisture. Climate change leaves soils drier in some areas, so they may absorb rainfall more quickly. This leads to less flooding. Dry soils can also become harder. In this case heavy rainfall runs off into rivers and lakes. This increases risks of flooding.

=== Groundwater quantity and quality ===
The impacts of climate change on groundwater may be greatest through its indirect effects on irrigation water demand via increased evapotranspiration. There is an observed declined in groundwater storage in many parts of the world. This is due to more groundwater being used for irrigation activities in agriculture, particularly in drylands. Some of this increase in irrigation can be due to water scarcity issues made worse by effects of climate change on the water cycle. Direct redistribution of water by human activities amounting to ~24,000 km^{3} per year is about double the global groundwater recharge each year.

Climate change causes changes to the water cycle which in turn affect groundwater in several ways: There can be a decline in groundwater storage, and reduction in groundwater recharge and water quality deterioration due to extreme weather events. In the tropics intense precipitation and flooding events appear to lead to more groundwater recharge.

However, the exact impacts of climate change on groundwater are still under investigation. This is because scientific data derived from groundwater monitoring is still missing, such as changes in space and time, abstraction data and "numerical representations of groundwater recharge processes".

Effects of climate change could have different impacts on groundwater storage: The expected more intense (but fewer) major rainfall events could lead to increased groundwater recharge in many environments. But more intense drought periods could result in soil drying-out and compaction which would reduce infiltration to groundwater.

== See also ==
- Effects of climate change on oceans
- Ocean temperature
- Evapotranspiration
