= ARSAT-3K =

Argentine geostationary communications satellite

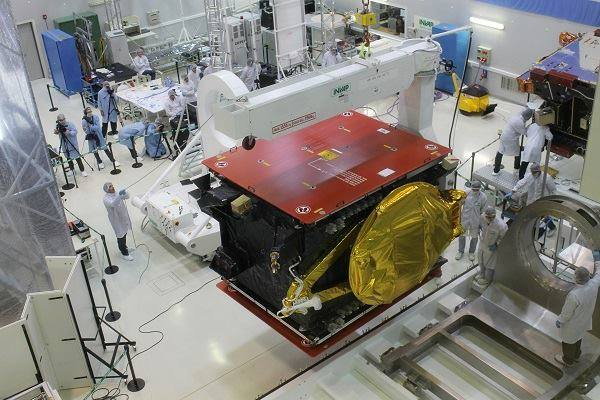
- ARSAT-1 in INVAP.
- Manufacturer: INVAP
- Country of origin: Argentina
- Operator: ARSAT S.A.
- Applications: Communications

Specifications
- Spacecraft type: Geostationary Communications satellite
- Launch mass: 2,900 kg (6,400 lb) to 3,000 kg (6,600 lb)
- Dry mass: < 1,500 kg (3,300 lb)
- Payload capacity: 350 kg (770 lb) and 3.5 kW
- Dimensions: Bus without payload nor solar panels:2 m (6.6 ft) × 1.8 m (5.9 ft) × 2.9 m (9.5 ft); Span with solar panels deployed: (16.5 m (54 ft)
- Power: 4.2 kW (end of life)
- Equipment: K_{u} band, K_{a} band and C Band payloads.
- Regime: Geostationary
- Design life: 15 years

Production
- Status: In Production
- On order: 3
- Built: 2
- Launched: 2
- Operational: 1
- Maiden launch: 16 October 2014, 21:43 UTC, ARSAT-1

ARSAT-3K is a geostationary communications satellite bus designed and manufactured by INVAP of Argentina for the local telecommunication company ARSAT S.A. It is a small (4.2 kW of power generation and 3,000 kg (6,600 lb) of launch mass) three axis stabilized platform designed, manufactured and tested completely in Argentina. It is capable of carrying up to 350 kg (770 lb) of payload with a maximum power consumption of 3.4 kW at the end of life. It currently uses only chemical propulsion, but a hybrid solution which would use bi-propellant propulsion for orbit raising and electric propulsion for station keeping is being developed. A purely electric propulsion version is planned.

== Platform Versions ==
=== ARSAT-3K ===
The ARSAT-3K is the initial version of this bus. It is comparable to the Thales Alenia Space Spacebus 3000B2. It uses an integrated chemical propulsion system supplied by EADS Astrium for both orbit raising and station keeping.

=== ARSAT-3H ===
The ARSAT-3H is the second version of this bus, which initiated its development during 2015. It will use an hybrid approach with bi-propellant propulsion for orbit raising and electric propulsion for station keeping.

It will keep the launch mass of 3 t (6,600 lb), but have enhanced capabilities, being able to carry a 350 kg (770 lb) of payload with a maximum power consumption of 7 kW at the end of its design life.

=== ARSAT-3E ===
The ARSAT-3E will be the third version of the platform. It will use electric propulsion exclusively. It will keep the payload and power envelope of the ARSAT-3H while applying the improvements to cost and weight reduction.

== List of satellites ==
The Argentine Geostationary Satellite Plan 2015-2035 (Spanish: Plan Satelital Geoestacionario Argentino 2015-2035) establishes a roadmap for the platform development until 2035.

ARSAT Satellite Plan
Satellite	Bus	Payload	Orbital Position	Launch	Status
ARSAT-1	ARSAT-3K	K_{u} band	71.8° West	21:43:52, October 16, 2014 (UTC)	Operational
ARSAT-2	ARSAT-3K	K_{u} band and C Band	81° West	20:30, September 30, 2015 (UTC)	Operational
ARSAT SG-1	ARSAT-3K	K_{a} band	81° West	2025	In Development
Chemical 2	ARSAT-3K	K_{a} band	TBA	TBA	Planned

== See also ==
- ARSAT S.A.
- INVAP
- ARSAT-1
- ARSAT-2
- ARSAT SG-1
