= ARSAT =

Argentine government-owned telecommunications company incorporated in 2006

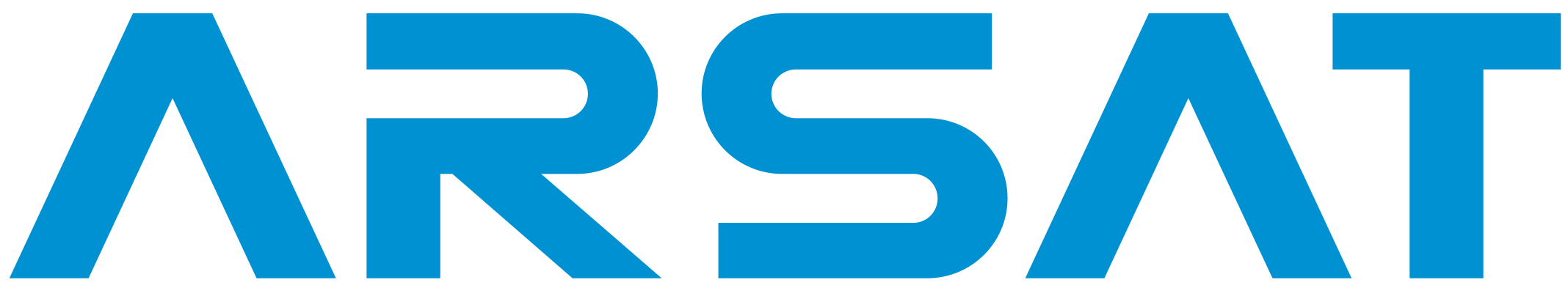

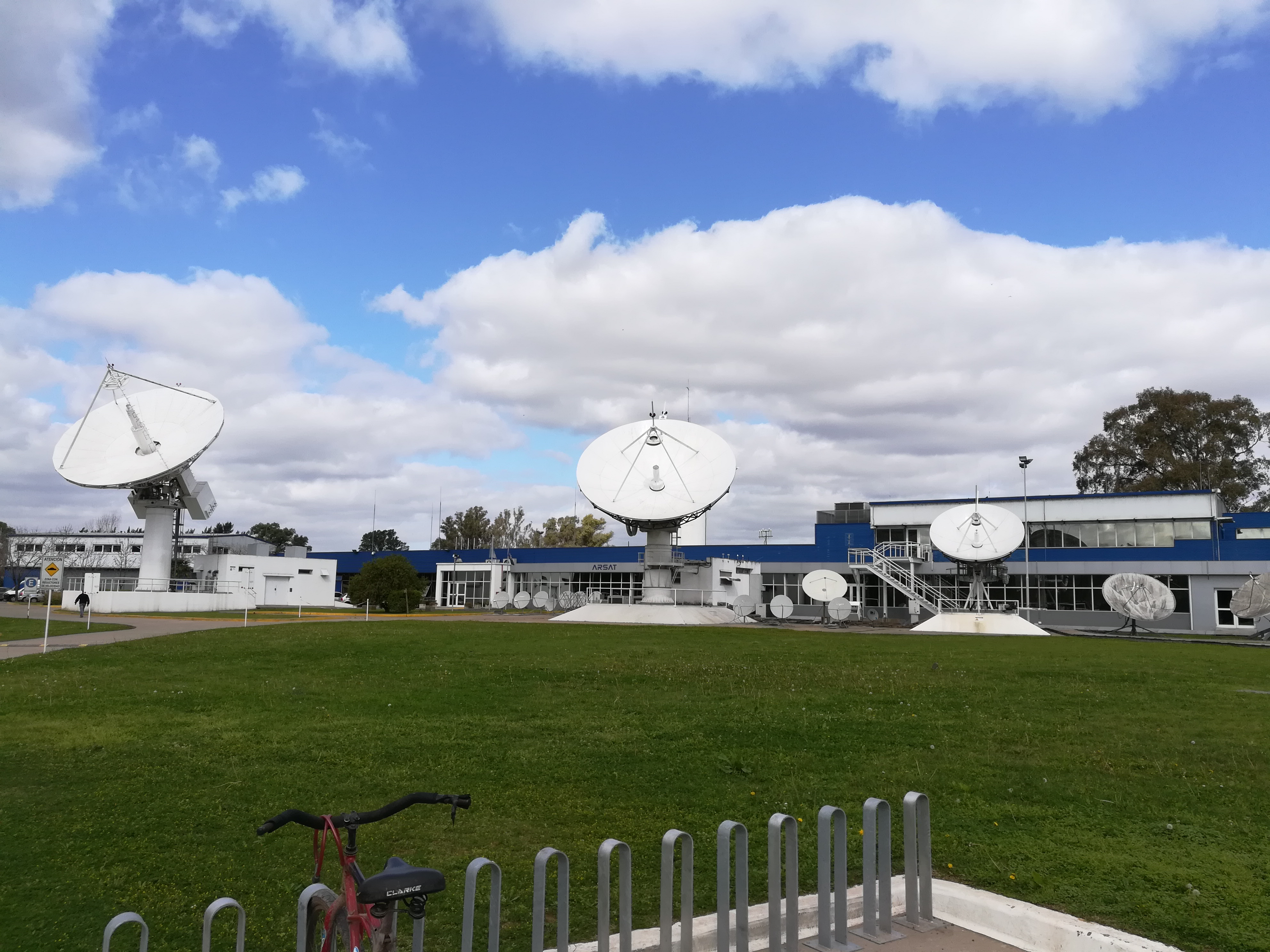
- ARSAT headquarters in Benavídez, Tigre Partido, Buenos Aires
- Native name: Empresa Argentina de Soluciones Satelitales Sociedad Anónima AR-SAT
- Type: Private
- Industry: Satellite telecommunications; Fiber-optic communication; Digital television infrastructure; Mobile phone infrastructure
- Predecessor: Nahuelsat S.A.
- Founded: April 26, 2006; 20 years ago in Buenos Aires, Argentina
- Founder: Government of Argentina
- Headquarters: Avenida del Libertador 498 – Piso 21, Buenos Aires, Argentina
- Area served: Argentina, South America, North America
- Key people: Matías BIANCHI VILLELLI (Chairman); Guillermo RUS (Vice-Chairman); Hugo Iván COUSTAU (Director); Fernando PÉREZ (Director); Marcelo TESORO (Director)
- Owner: Government of Argentina
- Number of employees: 400 (June 2014)
- Website: arsat.com.ar

Empresa Argentina de Soluciones Satelitales Sociedad Anónima AR-SAT, usually known simply as ARSAT, is an Argentine government-owned telecommunications company incorporated in 2006 as a Sociedad Anónima through the federal law 26.092. At the time of incorporation, its ownership was shared by the Ministry of Federal Planning, Public Investment and Services (98%) and the Ministry of Economy and Public Finances (2%).

== Business lines ==
=== Current business products ===
As of 2014, ARSAT had four business lines:

- TDA (Spanish: Televisión Digital Abierta): A country wide digital terrestrial television SATVD-T broadcasting network. The Argentine government ordered a national terrestrial network, where all licensed broadcasting stations can get their programs transmitted through the common system. ARSAT is in charge of developing and installing the initial 90 broadcasting stations.
- Argentine Geostationary Communication Satellite System (SSGAT for Spanish: Sistema Satelital Geoestacionario Argentino de Telecomunicaciones): The Argentine government has decided to fund a national satellite system where all ITU assigned geostationary orbital slots are filled with satellites designed and manufactured locally. It currently includes the ARSAT-1, ARSAT-2 and ARSAT-3.
  - Conectar Igualdad (Spanish for Connecting Equality): It's the national program for reducing the digital divide. ARSAT is in charge of the satellite segment of the program through the SSGAT.
  - TDA: ARSAT is also in charge of the satellite broadcasting segment of the national digital television broadcasting network.
- Federal Fiber Optics Network (ReFeFO for Spanish: Red Federal de Fibra Óptica): The Argentine government has funded a 52,000 km (32,000 mi) fiber optic network to transport Internet, Digital Television, Telephony and private data. ARSAT is in charge of its construction and operation.
  - Conectar Igualdad: ARSAT is also in charge of leveraging the RFFO for this digital divide program.
  - TDA: ARSAT is also in charge of connecting the TDA terrestrial network through the RFFO.
- Data Center: In its ground station in Benavídez, Tigre Partido, Buenos Aires, ARSAT has built and operates a 4,200 m^{2} (45,000 sq ft) TIER III certified data center.
- CEATSA: An environmental testing laboratory. While it is physically connected to INVAP's satellite manufacturing facility, ARSAT holds a majority ownership (80% as of 2015).

=== Former business products ===
- Libre.ar (cancelled): In December 2012, gave ARSAT a mandate to set up a cellular network that would be open to small operators. This was possible because the Government had kept a set of frequency bands for a national network operator. The program never materialized and just 18 months later the frequencies were put up for auction.

== Satellites ==
Satellite	Launch (UTC)	Launch Vehicle	Launch site	Orbit	Payload	Status	Notes
Nahuel 1A	22:04, January 30, 1997 (UTC)	Ariane 44L (V93)	Guiana Space Centre ELA-2	GSO 71.8 West	27 K_{u} band TPE	Retired on June 7, 2010	Launched along GE-2
ARSAT-1	21:43:52, October 16, 2014 (UTC)	Ariane 5ECA (VA220)	Guiana Space Centre ELA-3	GSO 71.8 West	32 K_{u} band TPE	Operational	Launched along Intelsat 30
ARSAT-2	20:30, September 30, 2015 (UTC)	Ariane 5ECA (VA226)	Guiana Space Centre ELA-3	GSO 81 West	24 IEEE K_{u} band TPE and 13 C band TPE	Operational	Launched along Sky Muster
ARSAT SG-1	2025	TBA	TBA	GSO 81 West	multi spot K_{a} band bent-pipe	In Development	Under construction.

== See also ==
- CEATSA
- Nahuel 1A
- ARSAT-1
- ARSAT-2
- ARSAT SG-1 (formerly ARSAT-3)
