= Activ8me =

Australian telecommunications carrier

Australian Private Networks Pty. Ltd.
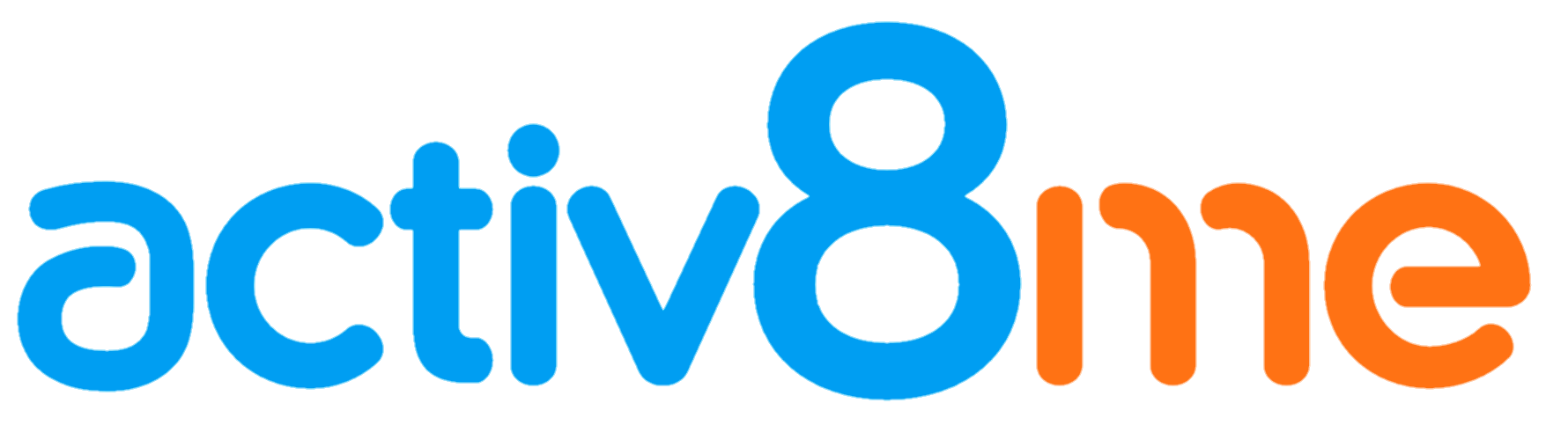
- Trade name: Activ8me
- Type: Privately held company
- Industry: Telecommunication
- Founded: 2002
- Headquarters: Melbourne, Australia
- Area served: Australia
- Services: Internet service provider; Wireless broadband; Satellite Internet access; Fiber to the x; Voice over IP; Public switched telephone network Telephone Services
- Website: www.activ8me.net.au

Activ8me is the trading name of an Australian telecommunications carrier and Internet service provider (ISP) operated by Australian Private Networks Pty. Ltd. Activ8me specialise in regional and remote Australian telecommunications and are the largest provider of satellite broadband services in Australia.

Their clients include the Department of the Prime Minister and Cabinet and Royal Flying Doctor Service of Australia.

Activ8me are a Retail Service Provider of fiber to the x broadband Internet through wholesale access agreements with NBN and OptiComm to sell Internet access to end users.

They are primarily focused on regional and remote Australian Internet and phone services, including NBN Fixed wireless and Sky Muster services.

The company was founded in 2002, before beginning trading as Activ8me in 2005, when headquarters and a warehouse facility were set up in Preston, Victoria.

Activ8me was contracted by the Australian Federal Government to build and maintain Remote Community Telecommunications Units (Solar powered public phone/WiFi equipment), which provides broadband and phone services to remote Australian communities for the Department of Prime Minister and Cabinet’s Remote Australia Strategies Programme. Activ8me has installed over 300 community phones since 2009 as part of the Programme.

As of July 2020, they are the largest Retail Service Provider of Sky Muster services in Australia.

== History ==
Australian Private Networks was founded in 2002 in South Australia initially providing satellite internet to 120 residential customers.

=== Timeline ===
- 2005 - Commenced trading as Activ8me. Headquarters is moved to Melbourne.
- 2006 - First Australian ISP to commercialise the IPSTAR satellite services and offer them to the regional Australian market.
- 2007 - First Australian ISP to offer a satellite VoIP service.
- 2009 - Activ8me is contracted by the Australian Federal Government to install 301 satellite-connected and solar powered public telephones in remote and isolated Indigenous communities.
- 2012 - Activ8me connected the first Fixed Wireless customer to fixed wireless access (FWA) services over nbn’s network.
- 2016 - Started offering satellite services over nbn’s Sky Muster satellite network, providing 25 Mbit/s services.
- 2019 - Entered a three-year major service partnership with the Royal Flying Doctor Service to install NBN ground stations offering WiFi, external airstrip lighting and emergency phone access to remote airstrips frequented by the RFDS that were previously ‘black spots’.

=== In the News ===
In 2018, Activ8me purchased Melbourne NBN provider Boom Broadband, absorbing all their nbn fixed line, fixed wireless and ADSL2+ customers.

In 2020, during the COVID-19 pandemic, Activ8me offered free data to customers due to the increase in demand due remote work and distance education.
