= ARSAT SG-1 =

Argentine geostationary communications satellite

- Mission type: Communication
- Operator: ARSAT
- Mission duration: 15 years

Spacecraft properties
- Spacecraft: ARSAT-SG1
- Bus: GSATCOM
- Manufacturer: INVAP
- Launch mass: 1,000 kilograms (2,200 lb)

Start of mission
- Launch date: 2026 (planned)

Orbital parameters
- Reference system: Geocentric
- Regime: Geostationary
- Longitude: 81° West

Transponders
- Band: multi spot K_{a} band bent-pipe
- Coverage area: Argentina

ARSAT SG-1 (or ARSAT Second Generation-1), formerly known as ARSAT-3, is a geostationary communications satellite ordered by ARSAT and being designed by the Argentine company INVAP.

== History ==
In 2015, ARSAT announced plans to add a third satellite to their satellite fleet, designated ARSAT-3. It was originally expected to be launched from French Guiana on an Ariane 5 ECA rocket in 2019, and inserted at the 81° West longitude geostationary slot. ARSAT-3 would be the third geostationary satellite built by INVAP, after ARSAT-1 and ARSAT-2, and would introduce an enhanced bus platform to enable enhanced services.

On a 2016 presentation, ARSAT disclosed that the project would be restarted in 2017. It would be a multi spot K_{a} band satellite based on the ARSAT-3K platform and have 40 Gbit/s of bandwidth. Its foot print would cover Argentina, Chile, Uruguay and part of Paraguay. Most presale contracts were signed during 2015 and were expecting to restart production by 2017 with the company's own resources.

By 2019, a lack of funding from the Argentine government had effectively stalled the project. The new administration elected in December 2019 agreed to reverse course and officially finance the third satellite, which was now designated ARSAT SG-1 (Second Generation-1). This name change reflects major improvements in SG-1's capabilities compared to the original ARSAT-3 design, including high-throughput K_{a} band capacity and all-electric propulsion thanks to the new GSATCOM spacecraft bus. SG-1 is planned for launch in 2026 on a to-be-announced launch vehicle.

== See also ==
- Nahuel 1A
- ARSAT-1
- ARSAT-2
