= ARSAT-2 =

Argentine geostationary communications satellite

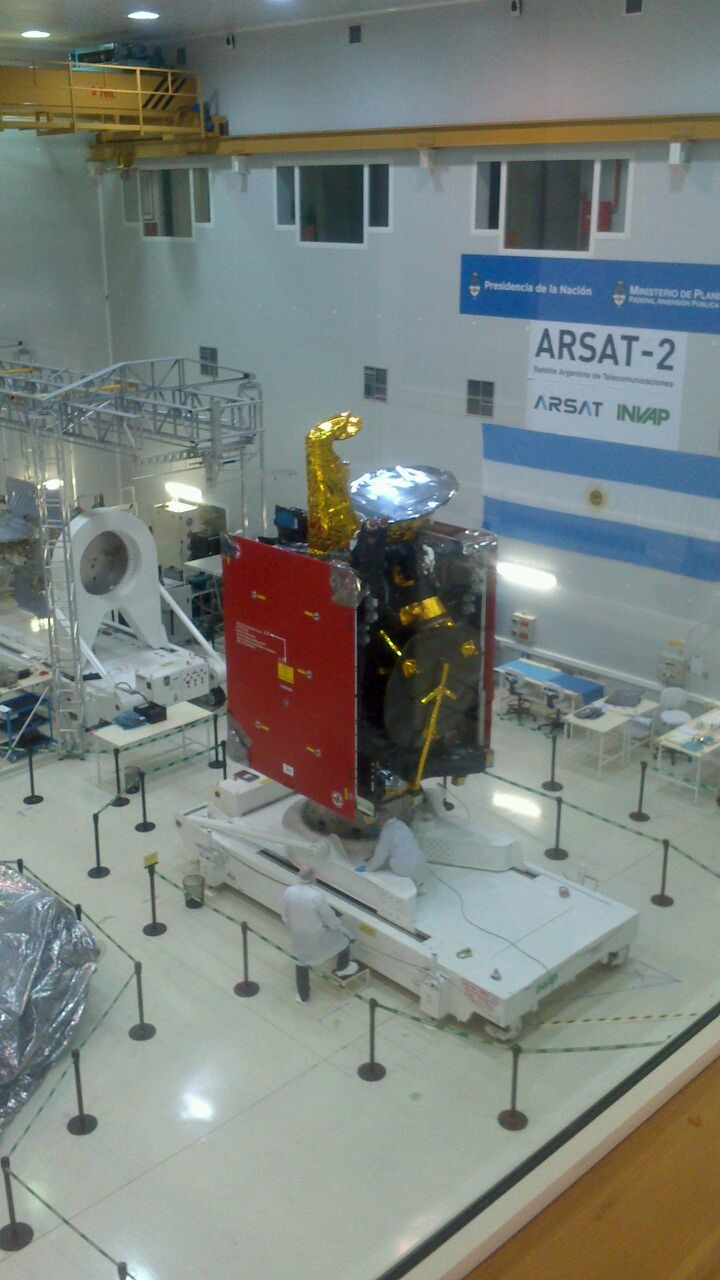
- ARSAT-2 in INVAP.
- Mission type: Communication
- Operator: ARSAT
- COSPAR ID: 2015-054B
- SATCAT no.: 40941
- Mission duration: 15 years

Spacecraft properties
- Spacecraft: ARSAT-2
- Bus: ARSAT-3K
- Manufacturer: INVAP; Thales Alenia Space
- Launch mass: 2,977 kilograms (6,563 lb)
- Power: 4,600 W

Start of mission
- Launch date: 20:30, September 30, 2015 (UTC)
- Rocket: Ariane 5ECA
- Launch site: Kourou ELA-3
- Contractor: Arianespace

Orbital parameters
- Reference system: Geocentric
- Regime: Geostationary
- Longitude: 81° West

Transponders
- Band: 20 (24 36 MHz equivalent) IEEE K_{u} band and 6 (13 36 MHz equivalent) IEEE C band transponders
- Frequency: K_{u} band and C band
- Bandwidth: K_{u} band: 864 MHz; C band: 464 MHz
- Coverage area: North and South America
- ARSAT-2 Mission Logo ARSAT Satellite Fleet

ARSAT-2 is a geostationary communications satellite operated by ARSAT and built by the Argentine company INVAP. It was launched from French Guiana alongside Sky Muster satellite using an Ariane 5ECA rocket on September 30, 2015 at 20:30hs UTC, becoming the 400th satellite to be launched by Arianespace. It is licensed to be located at 81° West longitude geostationary slot. ARSAT-2 is the second geostationary satellite built in Argentina, after ARSAT-1. Structurally and mechanically it is a copy of the ARSAT-1, the only difference being the payload and thus it has different antenna configuration.

== Payload ==
ARSAT-2 payload was supplied by Thales Alenia Space. It consists of both K_{u} band and C band sections.

The K_{u} band has 20 physical transponders. Of those, sixteen have a 36 MHz bandwidth and four have 72 MHz. Thus the satellite has a maximum capacity of 864 MHz K_{u} or 24 transponder equivalent. A 2 m (6.6 ft) deployable antenna and a 1.3 m (4.3 ft) fixed Gregorian antenna.

The C band section has a single 1.6 m (5.2 ft) deployable antenna that is fed by six physical transponders. Four have 72 MHz of bandwidth and the other two have 88 MHz. The total available C Band bandwidth is thus 464 MHz (or 12.9 transponder equivalent).

== See also ==
- ARSAT-1
- ARSAT SG-1
- Nahuel 1A
