= ARSAT-1 =

Argentine geostationary communications satellite

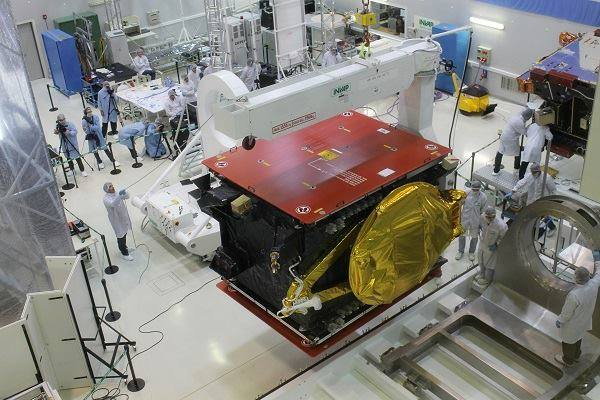
- ARSAT-1 in INVAP.
- Mission type: Communication
- Operator: AR-SAT
- COSPAR ID: 2014-062B
- SATCAT no.: 40272
- Mission duration: 15 years

Spacecraft properties
- Spacecraft: ARSAT-1
- Bus: ARSAT-3K
- Manufacturer: INVAP; Thales Alenia Space
- Launch mass: 2,985 kilograms (6,581 lb)

Start of mission
- Launch date: 16 October 2014, 21:43 UTC
- Rocket: Ariane 5ECA
- Launch site: Kourou ELA-3
- Contractor: Arianespace

Orbital parameters
- Reference system: Geocentric
- Regime: Geostationary
- Longitude: 72° West
- Perigee altitude: 35,787 kilometres (22,237 mi)
- Apogee altitude: 35,799 kilometres (22,244 mi)
- Inclination: 0.02 degrees
- Period: 1436.13 minutes
- Epoch: 24 January 2015, 05:32:19 UTC

Transponders
- Band: 24 IEEE K_{u} band
- Coverage area: Southern South America
- ARSAT-1 Mission Logo ARSAT Satellite Fleet

ARSAT-1 is a geostationary communications satellite operated by AR-SAT and built by the Argentine company INVAP. ARSAT-1 was launched into orbit on October 16, 2014, from French Guiana alongside Intelsat-30 satellite using an Ariane 5 rocket. It is expected to be located at 72° West longitude geostationary slot. ARSAT-1 is the first geostationary satellite built in Latin America. Total cost of the satellite is 270 million US dollars.

ARSAT-1 carries a total of 24 IEEE K_{u} band (NATO J-band) transponders. Twelve will be operating at 36 MHz, eight at 54 MHz and four at 72 MHz, for a total bandwidth of 1152 MHz. It will offer a wide range of telecommunications, data transmission, telephone and television services mainly across all of Argentina, Chile, Uruguay and Paraguay including direct broadcast TV in the ISDB-S standard.

== Description ==
The ARSAT-1 is the first flight model of the ARSAT-3K satellite bus developed by INVAP for ARSAT S.A. It is a small (around 3 t (3.3 tons) at launch) platform with a 350 kg (770 lb) maximum payload mass and 3.5 kW of payload power consumption at the satellite end of life. It uses an integrated chemical propulsion system supplied by EADS Astrium for both orbit raising and station keeping.

The satellite uses a K_{u} band communication payload which was supplied by Thales Alenia Space. It is a composed of twelve 36 MHz transponders, eight of 54 MHz and four of 72 MHz, for a total bandwidth of 1152 MHz or 32 TPE.

== History ==
On April 26, 2006, the Argentine Federal Law 26.092 created ARSAT S.A. By section 8 of said law the company is given the right to exploit the 81° West orbital slot. By Section 4 of the company's constitution, it is mandated to build in the country and operate a communication satellite. By the Decree 626/2007 of the National Communications Commission published on May 30, 2007, the rights to the 71.8° West orbital slot is transferred from Nahuelsat to ARSAT S.A. On August 28, 2008, ARSAT S.A. signs the order for the ARSAT-1 satellite with INVAP. On December 10, 2008, INVAP and ARSAT S.A. successfully performed the Preliminary Design Review for the satellite design.

On September 8, 2009, ARSAT announced that Thales Alenia Space had been selected to supply the communication payload of the satellite and that Astrium would supply the hardware for the onboard computer, the central cylinder and some of the propulsion subsystems. On September 8, 2010, Honeywell announces that it had received a $2.4 million order to supply the reaction wheels and the MIMU for the satellite.

In April 2010, ARSAT announced that Arianespace would launch ARSAT-1 from the Guiana Space Centre. On February 21, 2013, the mating of the ARSAT-3K satellite bus and the payload module was successfully completed.

In October 2013 the environmental testing campaign was started with the month long thermal vacuum chamber tests. It went through a series of mass properties measures before going into the vibration testing in January. On February 10, 2014, ARSAT-1 successfully passed the vibration environment simulation on the CEATSA shaker. It then performed a series of sound environment simulations that assured that the satellite would survive the launch environment.

It later went through an electromagnetic compatibility testing and later the communication payload radio emission properties were tested to certify that it adhered to the specification. On July 7, 2014, it was announced that the satellite had passed all tests and was ready for packaging and transport.

On April 1, 2014, the insurance policy for both ARSAT-1 and ARSAT-2 was signed between ARSAT S.A. and the national bank insurance company. It was an innovative policy which included two satellites and covered the whole expected life, instead of the usual launch plus first year of operations. It enabled ARSAT to achieve substantially lower costs than what they could otherwise get for an unflown design.

Between August 11 and 12, 2014, the satellite was packaged within its container. And on August 31, it was loaded on an AN-124 which transported it to Kourou, on French Guiana. On September 22, it finished the Launch System Electric Performance Test and was ready for integration with the Ariane-5 launcher. On October 9, the satellite was mated in the lower berth of the launch vehicle.

On October 16, 2014, at 21:43:52hs UTC, ARSAT-1 was successfully launched from the Guiana Space Centre ELA-3 by an Ariane-5ECA on its VA220 flight. It flew along the Intelsat 30 which rode on the top berth of the fairing. Two days later, on October 18, it performed the first of five orbital maneuvers using its 400 N (90 lb_{f}) LAE to increase the perigee to 4,654 km (2,892 mi) and reduced the inclination to 3.5°. On October 20 it performed the second orbital maneuver increasing its perigee to 14,050 km (8,730 mi) while reducing the inclination to 1.52°. On October 22 the third maneuver increased the perigee to 29,000 km (18,000 mi) and reduced the inclination to less than 1°. On October 24 and 25 it performed the fourth and fifth maneuvers finally reaching the geostationary orbit.

On October 27 the LAE was disabled to prevent inadvertent ignitions. All further maneuvering would be done with thrusters. Next day the solar panels were fully deployed and latched, as well as the deployable antenna. The satellite was also put into Earth Attitude Mode where it automatically point towards Earth. While the component check out was performed, the satellite was let to drift to the 81° West orbital slot for the In Orbit Testing phase. It reached that slot on November 2.

Between October 31 and November 18 the In Orbit Testing was successfully performed by ARSAT-1. It included testing of all subsystems, such as avionics, thermal management, power supply system and payload. It required slight attitude changes to validate the wave and power characteristics of the satellite signal. It successfully passed all tests finally validating the spacecraft performance.

On December 13, ARSAT-1 performed its first public transmission from its final 71.8° West position. While the satellite was finally commissioned for operations, the migration of clients from AMC-6 to ARSAT-1 was expected to take many months. On May 12, 2015, ARSAT S.A. announced that ARSAT had successfully passed its first eclipse season between February 26 and April 13. It was a very particular season since the Earth and Moon eclipses were combined in such a way to make one of the longest eclipses of the 21st century (for that geostationary slot). This constituted the last technical hurdle to test since it stressed to the maximum requirement the battery and thermal management subsystems.

On May 20, 2015, ARSAT S.A. announced that thanks to the high efficiency of the orbital maneuvers, the expected service life of ARSAT-1 was extended to 18 years. The orbit raising maneuvers had required less propellant (67%) than expected (80%) and allotting that fuel to station keeping would enable the spacecraft to stay in orbit for 18 years, should no component failure require its early retirement. It was further stated that the migration of clients from AMC-6 to ARSAT-1 had been performed for 96% of clients, and that the satellite utilization was 76%.

== See also ==
- Nahuel 1A
- ARSAT-2
- ARSAT-3
