= Aquarius (SAC-D instrument) =

NASA instrument aboard the Argentine SAC-D spacecraft

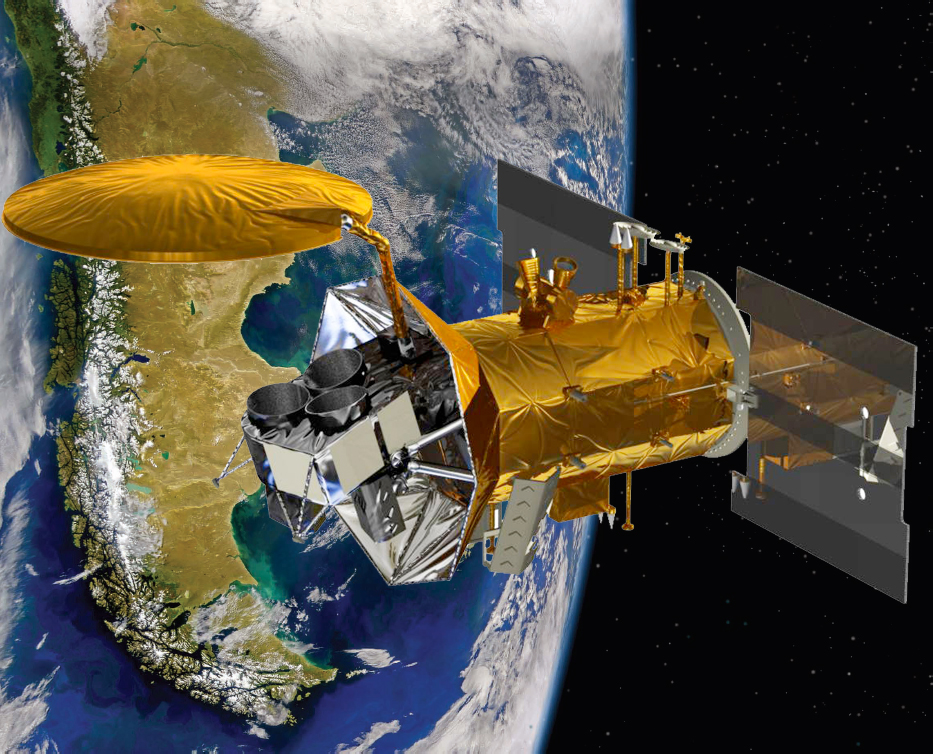
- Artist's concept of the SAC-D satellite
- Operator: NASA
- Instrument type: Radiometer
- Function: Oceanography
- Mission duration: 3 years
- Website: Aquarius Mission

Host spacecraft
- Spacecraft: SAC-D
- Operator: CONAE
- Launch date: June 10, 2011; 14:20 UTC
- Rocket: Delta II
- Launch site: Vandenberg SLC-2W
- Orbit: LEO

Aquarius was a NASA instrument aboard the Argentine SAC-D spacecraft. Its mission was to measure global sea surface salinity to better predict future climate conditions.

Aquarius was shipped to Argentina on June 1, 2009 to be mounted in the INVAP-built SAC-D satellite. It came back to Vandenberg Air Force Base on March 31, 2011.

For the joint mission, Argentina provided the SAC-D spacecraft and additional science instruments, while NASA provided the Aquarius salinity sensor and the rocket launch platform. The National Aeronautics and Space Administration (NASA)'s Jet Propulsion Laboratory in Pasadena, California, managed the Aquarius Mission development for NASA's Earth Science Enterprise based in Washington, D.C., and NASA's Goddard Spaceflight Center in Greenbelt, Maryland, managed the mission after launch.

The observatory was successfully launched from Vandenberg Air Force Base on June 10, 2011. After its launch aboard a Delta II from Vandenberg Air Force Base in California, SAC-D was carried into a 657 km (408 mi) Sun-synchronous orbit to begin its 3-year mission.

On June 7, 2015, the SAC-D satellite carrying Aquarius suffered a power supply failure, ending the mission.

== Background and instrumentation ==
The spacecraft's mission is a joint program between the National Aeronautics and Space Administration (NASA) and Argentina's space agency, Comisión Nacional de Actividades Espaciales (CONAE). The Aquarius sensors are flown on the (now inoperative) Satélite de Applicaciones Científicas (SAC)-D spacecraft 657 kilometers (408 miles) above earth in a sun-synchronous, polar orbit that repeats itself once a week. Its instrument resolution was 150 kilometers (93 miles).

Aquarius' objective was to provide insight into the effect of salt on the Earth's weather and climate systems by making the first space based observations of variations in salinity and creating global ocean salinity distribution maps. Data from the instrument will be able to show changes in the ocean's salinity on monthly, yearly and seasonal time scales.

Oceanographers use the Practical Salinity Scale (PSS) to measure salinity based on measurements of temperature, pressure and seawater conductivity and create a ratio. The PSS compares the conductivity ratio of a sample of seawater to a standard KCl solution. The oceanic average sea surface salinity is about 35 PSS (or 3.5% salt) and varies globally from 32 to 37 PSS. The Aquarius mission goal is to measure changes in salinity of 0.2 PSS.

Aquarius measured sea surface salinity by using radiometers to detect changes in the oceans microwave thermal emissions frequencies due to salinity. Aquarius' three radiometers have antenna reflectors 2.5 meters (8.2 feet) in diameter that are able to scan a 390 kilometer (242 mile) wide swath of the ocean's surface collectively. The radiometers on Aquarius are the most accurate ever and were able to sense at a frequency of 1.4 GHz.

Raw data records from the Aquarius instrument were transmitted from CONAE to the ground station at NASA's Goddard Space Flight Center (GSFC) in Greenbelt, MD. The CONAE ground station is located in Córdoba, Argentina, where mission operations are conducted, data is processed and instrument operations are held. The processed data will create salinity related data products that will be archived for use by NASA's Physical Oceanography Distributed Active Archive Center (PO.DAAC) in Pasadena, CA's Jet Propulsion Laboratory (JPL).

== Observations and future research ==
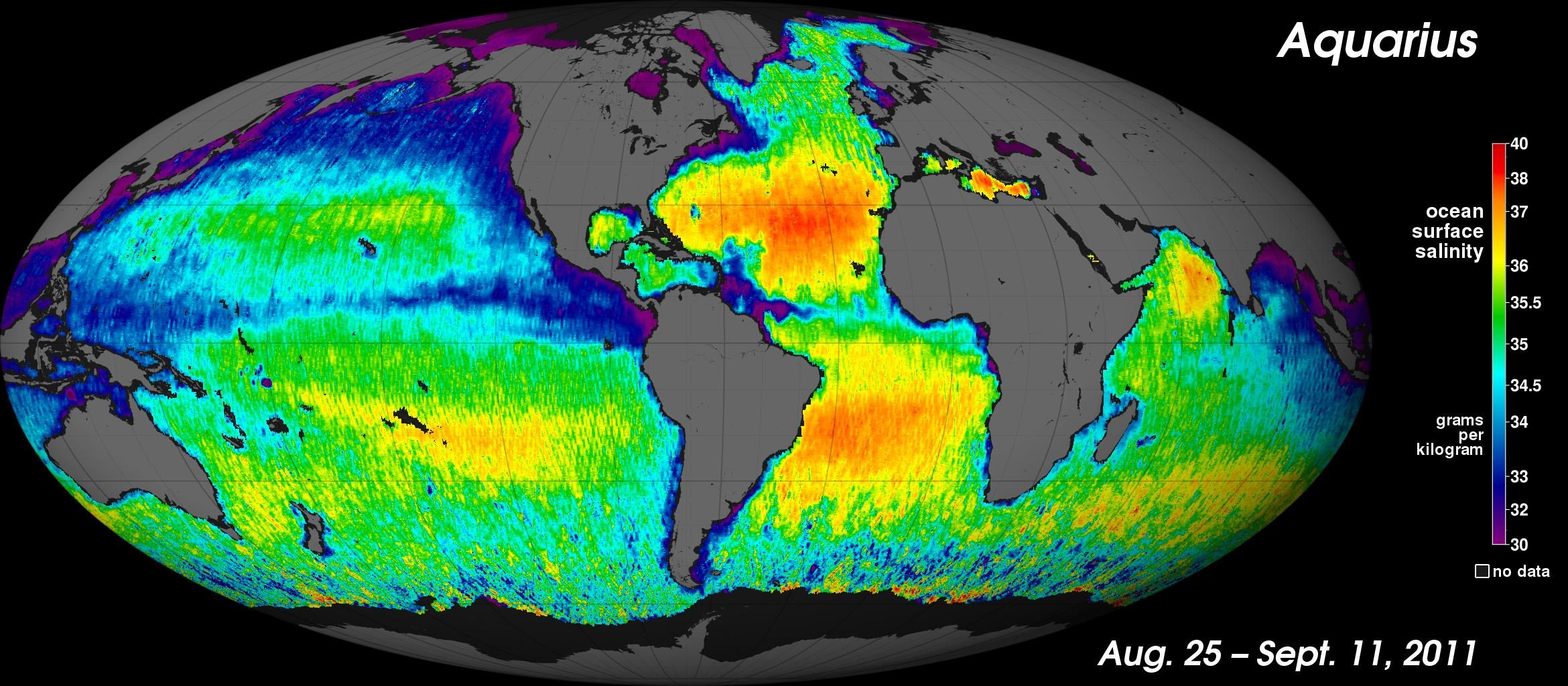
Ocean Salinity Map developed with Aquarius' first light data

The NASA Aquarius instrument aboard Argentina's SAC-D satellite is designed to measure global sea surface salinity. This movie shows salinity patterns as measured by Aquarius from December 2011 through December 2012. Red colors represent areas of high salinity, while blue shades represent areas of low salinity. It is important to understand salinity, the amount of dissolved salts in water, because it will lead us to better understanding of the water cycle and can lead to improved climate models. High concentrations (over 37 practical salinity units) are usually in the center of the ocean basins away from the mouths of rivers, which input fresh water. High concentrations are also in sub-tropical regions due to high rates of evaporation (clear skies, little rain, and prevailing winds) and in landlocked seas in arid regions. At high latitudes, salinity is low. This can be attributed to lower evaporation rates and the melting of ice that dilutes seawater. To sum up, salinity is low where precipitation is greater than evaporation, mainly in coastal or equatorial regions. Credit: NASA/GSFC/JPL-Caltech

After less than one month in operation, Aquarius produced the first map showing the varying degrees of salinity across the ocean's surface produced by NASA. The first salinity maps from space were provided by the European Space Agency satellite SMOS (Soil Moisture and Ocean Salinity) that was launched in November 2009. Previous satellites enabled measurement of ocean currents, sea surface temperature and winds, and ocean color. Aquarius adds the ability to measure another ocean variable – the salt content. Measuring sea surface salinity (SSS) will supplement other satellite observations of the global water cycle: precipitation, evaporation, soil moisture, atmospheric water vapor, and sea ice extent.

In the past, salinity measurements have been taken using instruments in buoys and on ships, however the measurements are inconsistent and don't provide accurate data over large temporal and spatial regions. Aquarius' ability to consistently map the oceans enables scientists to create more advanced computer models to study sea surface salinity and potentially forecast future climate conditions.
