= SAC-D =

Argentine Earth science satellite

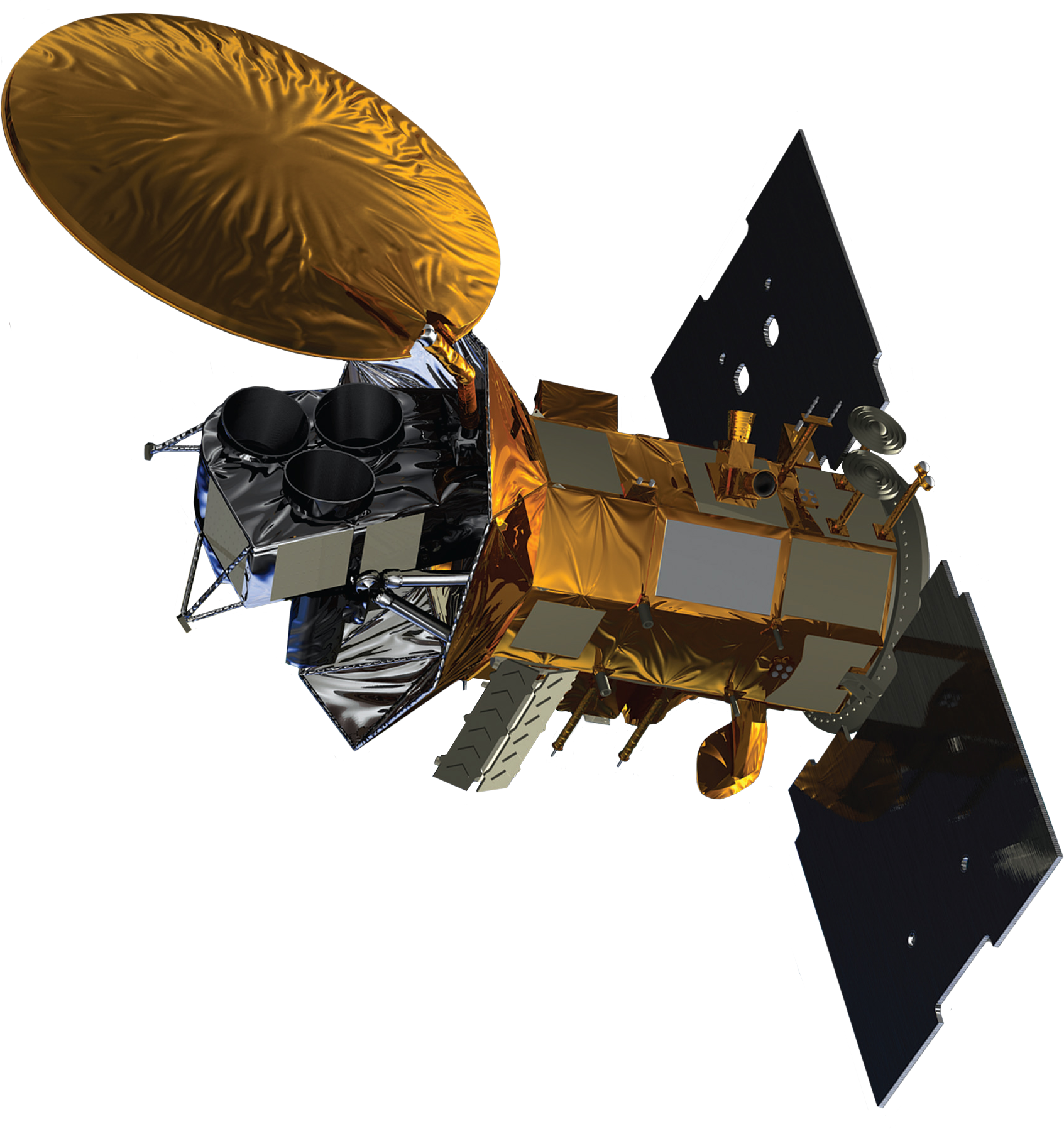
- Artist's impression of SAC-D
- Mission type: Technology demonstration Earth observation
- Operator: CONAE
- COSPAR ID: 2011-024A
- SATCAT no.: 37673
- Website: conae.gov.ar
- Mission duration: Planned: 5 years Final: 3 years, 11 months, 28 days

Spacecraft properties
- Bus: Small Satellite Standard Platform
- Manufacturer: INVAP
- Launch mass: 1,350 kg (2,977 lb)
- Dimensions: 2.7 × 5.0 m (8.9 × 16.4 ft)
- Power: 1,362 watts

Start of mission
- Launch date: 10 June 2011, 14:20:13 UTC
- Rocket: Delta II 7320-10C
- Launch site: Vandenberg SLC-2W
- Contractor: United Launch Alliance

End of mission
- Disposal: Spacecraft failure
- Last contact: 8 June 2015

Orbital parameters
- Reference system: Geocentric
- Regime: Low Earth
- Semi-major axis: 7,031.6 km (4,369.2 mi)
- Eccentricity: 0.000181
- Perigee altitude: 652.2 km (405.3 mi)
- Apogee altitude: 654.7 km (406.8 mi)
- Inclination: 98.0 degrees
- Period: 97.8 minutes
- Epoch: 17 December 2015, 15:47:23 UTC
Instruments
- Aquarius
- MWR: Microwave Radiometer
- NIRST: New Infrared Sensor Technology
- HSC: High Sensitivity Camera
- DCS: Data Collection System
- TDP: Technological Demonstration Package
- ROSA: Radio Occultation Sounder for Atmosphere
- ICARE-NG: Influence of Space Radiation on Advanced Components-New Generation
- SODAD: Orbital System for an Active Detection of Debris

SAC-D (Spanish: Satélite de Aplicaciones Científicas-D, meaning Satellite for Scientific Applications-D), also known as Aquarius after its primary instrument, was an Argentine Earth science satellite built by INVAP and operated by CONAE. SAC-D was launched from Vandenberg Air Force Base in the U.S. on 10 June 2011, with a planned mission life of five years. Due to a power system failure, the mission was ended on 8 June 2015.

== Description ==
SAC-D was an international collaboration between the space agencies of Argentina and the United States, CONAE and NASA, with participation from Brazil (INPE), Canada (CSA), France (CNES) and Italy (ASI). It carried five Earth observation instruments (NASA, CONAE, CSA, ASI), two space science instruments (CNES), a data collection instrument (CONAE), and a technology demonstration system (CONAE).

The spacecraft's main instrument, Aquarius, was built by NASA's Jet Propulsion Laboratory and Goddard Space Flight Center. It collected data from 25 August 2011 to 7 June 2015, exceeding its intended three year primary mission. Aquarius' mission was to demonstrate that accurate measurements of salinity could be made from space, and was the first spaceborne instrument to use both passive radiometers and active radar in the L band. By measuring ocean salinity, scientists are better able to understand the Earth's water cycle and ocean circulation. Project scientists later derived a method of pulling soil moisture data from Aquarius' radiometer.

== Launch ==
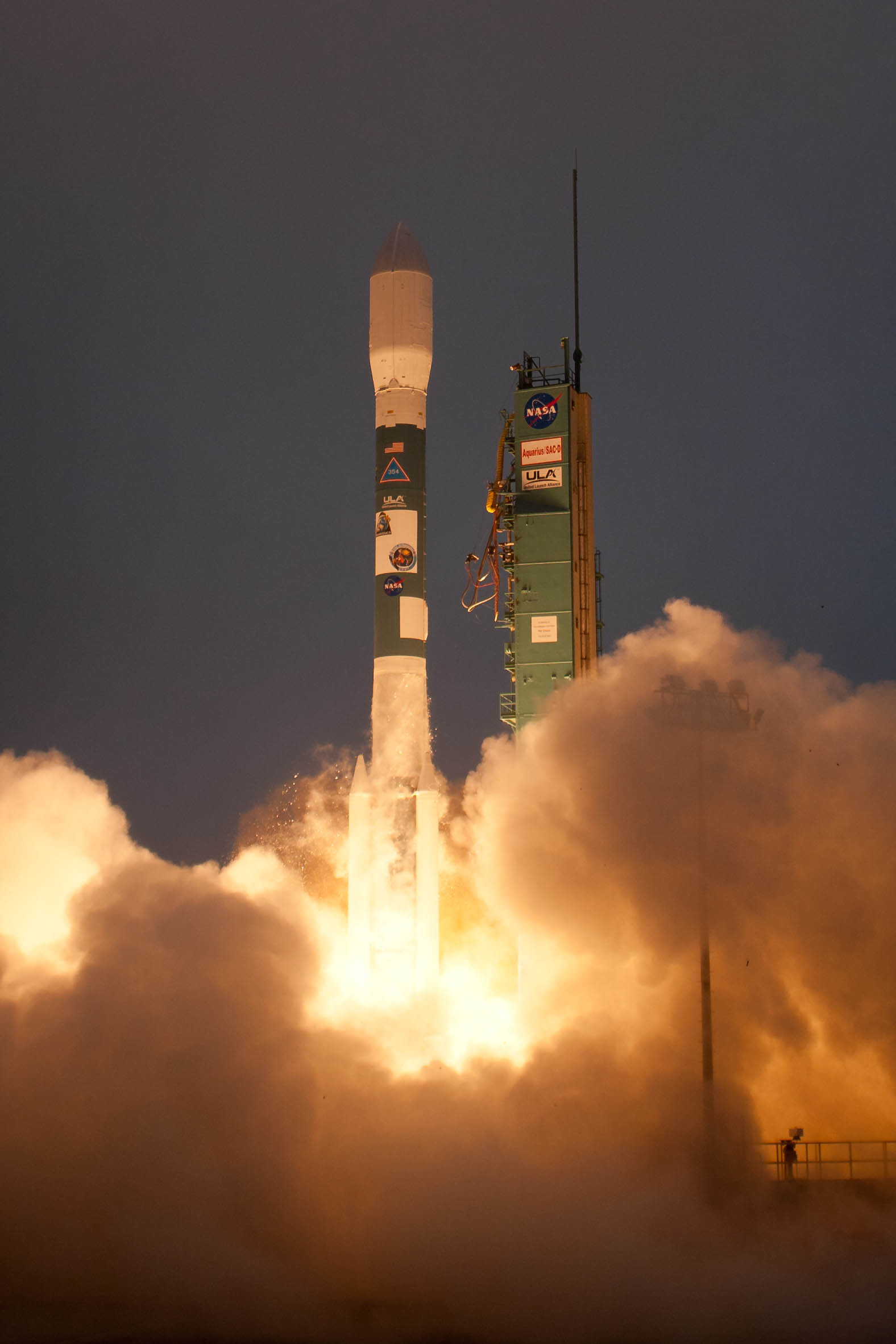
Launch of SAC-D

NASA launched SAC-D from Vandenberg Air Force Base's Space Launch Complex 2W aboard a Delta II 7320-10C on 10 June 2011 at 14:20:13 UTC. The launch was delayed from May 2010 because development of the spacecraft was taking longer than expected.

== Accomplishments ==
The Aquarius instrument's surface salinity measurements contributed to a better understanding of ocean dynamics and advancing climate and ocean models, both from season to season and year to year. The models still are improving El Niño prediction. Aquarius global salinity maps show how freshwater plumes coming from the mouth of large rivers and the precipitation and evaporation over the oceans affect the salinity structure of the ocean.

“The Aquarius sensor collected three years and nine months of valuable data. It was truly a pioneering effort to determine how accurately we could measure ocean salinity from space and for the first time study large and small-scale interactions of the global water cycle.” Aquarius principal investigator Gary Lagerloef of Earth & Space Research, Seattle.

Aquarius provided information into the natural exchange of freshwater between the ocean, atmosphere and sea ice, which influences ocean circulation, weather and climate.

Data from Aquarius showed how extreme floods affect the seas and how low-salinity river plumes affect hurricane intensity. Aquarius data was important to the Salinity Processes in the Upper Ocean Regional Study (SPURS), a year-long international field study of the oceanographic processes that sustain the maximum surface salinities in the central subtropical North Atlantic, and influence global ocean circulation.

The Aquarius instrument successfully achieved its science objectives and completed its primary three-year mission in November 2014.

== Failure of spacecraft ==
On 7 June 2015 at 12:53:17 UTC, telemetry indicated a failure of the spacecraft's Remote Terminal Unit (RTU), causing loss of onboard power regulation and attitude stabilization. While efforts were made to recover the spacecraft, the mission was declared over on 8 June.

== Instruments ==
Abbreviation	Name	Operator	Purpose
—	Aquarius	NASA	Ocean salinity research
MWR	Microwave Radiometer	CONAE	Radiometry
NIRST	New Infrared Sensor Technology	CONAE; CSA	Infrared imagery, determination of sea temperatures
HSC	High Sensitivity Camera	CONAE	Imaging of aurorae, fires, and lights
DCS	Data Collection System	CONAE	Collection of data provided by platforms on Earth. Compatible with Argos system
TDP	Technological Demonstration Package	CONAE	Technology demonstration involving GPS navigation and inertial guidance
ROSA	Radio Occultation Sounder for Atmosphere	ASI	Measurement of temperature and humidity in the atmosphere
ICARE-NG	Influence of Space Radiation on Advanced Components-New Generation	CNES	Part of CARMEN-1 mission; study of cosmic radiation and its effects on electronics
SODAD	Orbital System for an Active Detection of Debris	CNES	Part of CARMEN-1 mission; study of particles and debris in space

== See also ==
- 2011 in spaceflight
- Jason-1
- Ocean Surface Topography Mission
- Aquarius (SAC-D instrument)
