= Sky Muster =

Geostationary (GEO) communications satellites operated by NBN Co Limited

NBN-Co 1A
- Mission type: Communication
- Operator: NBN
- COSPAR ID: 2015-054A
- SATCAT no.: 40940

Spacecraft properties
- Bus: SSL 1300
- Manufacturer: SSL
- Launch mass: 6,440 kilograms (14,200 lb)

Start of mission
- Launch date: 30 September 2015
- Rocket: Ariane 5
- Launch site: Kourou ELA-3
- Contractor: Arianespace

Orbital parameters
- Reference system: Geocentric
- Regime: Geostationary
- Longitude: 140° E
- Period: 23 hours, 56 minutes, 4 seconds

Transponders
- Band: Ka band
- Frequency: Earth to the satellite being transmitted at 27 GHz to 31 GHz, satellite to the Earth being transmitted at 17.7 GHz to 22 GHz
- Capacity: Currently 135 Gbit/s combined (1A and 1B), final capacity 185 Gbit/s
- Coverage area: Australia mainland and some overseas territories

The Sky Muster satellites are two geostationary (GEO) communications satellites operated by NBN Co Limited and built by SSL. They were launched in 2015 and 2016 to provide fast broadband in areas where NBN didn't want to either lay fiber or install enough wireless antennas and offshore. The satellites are positioned 35,786 kilometres (22,236 mi) above the equator, north of Australia. They provide download speeds to users of up to 100 Mbit/s, and upload speeds of up to 10 Mbit/s.

Each Sky Muster has 101 spot beams, which are focused satellite signals which are specially concentrated in power and cover a specific geographic area. The electromagnetic K_{a} band spot beams are used to carry information from the end users' equipment on the ground to the satellites. Each satellite offers 80 gigabits per second of bandwidth. The two satellites will provide high-speed broadband service to 400,000 Australian homes and businesses in rural and remote Australia. The two satellites were designed to provide service for at least 15 years.

Sky Muster I (NBN-Co 1A) was launched on 1 October 2015 from the Guiana Space Centre in French Guiana, South America, alongside Argentina's ARSAT-2, on an Ariane 5ECA rocket.

Sky Muster I operates in geostationary orbit of 140° East. Sky Muster I became operational in April 2016.

Sky Muster II (NBN-Co 1B) was launched on 5 October 2016, and operates in geostationary orbit of 145° East.

Initial services were offered on the service to end users commencing in January, 2016.

As of June 2020, there are over 100,000 active customers connected to a Sky Muster service, with the largest single Retail Service Provider of Sky Muster services being SkyMesh with over 40,000 active Sky Muster connections.

In August 2025, NBN Co announced an agreement with Amazon's Project Kuiper to provide wholesale fixed broadband via a new LEO service offering supplied by NBN Co. The new service offering is expected to be available from the middle of 2026, and will eventually replace the current geostationary service offering as the satellites reach the end of their operational life, around 2032.

== Background ==
The two NBN satellites, Sky Muster (NBN-Co 1A) and Sky Muster II (NBN-Co 1B), were conceived in 2012 under the Gillard Labor government, as part of the original National Broadband Network scheme and NBN Co contracted Space Systems/Loral (SSL) to build and launch the two satellites as part of a total investment costing A$2 billion. The launch was conducted in accordance with the Space Activities Act 1998, which requires Ministerial approval for the launch of a space object from Australia or the launch of a space object by an Australian entity from an overseas location.

Bailey Brooks, a six-year old School of the Air student who lives on a cattle station 400 kilometres (250 mi) from Alice Springs, won a competition to draw a picture of how the satellite benefits rural Australians. Her drawing of the rocket was printed on the payload fairing, and her class named NBN-Co 1A "Sky Muster" as it would bring Australians together like a cattle muster.
