= AMC-2 =

Communications satellite

- Names: GE-2 (1997-2001); AMC-2 (2001-present)
- Mission type: Communications
- Operator: GE Americom (1997-2001); SES Americom (2001-2009); SES World Skies (2009-2011); SES S.A. (2011-present)
- COSPAR ID: 1997-002A
- SATCAT no.: 24713
- Mission duration: 15 years (planned); 29 years, 3 months, 14 days (elapsed)

Spacecraft properties
- Spacecraft: GE-2
- Spacecraft type: Lockheed Martin A2100
- Bus: LM A2100A
- Manufacturer: Lockheed Martin
- Launch mass: 2,648 kg (5,838 lb)
- Dry mass: 1,300 kg (2,900 lb)

Start of mission
- Launch date: 30 January 1997, 22:04:00 UTC
- Rocket: Ariane 44L (V93)
- Launch site: Centre Spatial Guyanais, ELA-2
- Contractor: Arianespace

Orbital parameters
- Reference system: Geocentric orbit
- Regime: Geostationary orbit
- Longitude: 85° West

Transponders
- Band: 48 transponders: 24 C-band; 24 Ku-band
- Coverage area: North America

GE-2, called AMC-2 after 2001, is a privately owned American communications satellite launched in 1997. It was the first of the GE series to be launched outside the United States. It was launched by an Ariane 44L on 30 January 1997 at 22:04:00 UTC, flying from ELA-2, Centre Spatial Guyanais alongside another satellite, Nahuel 1A. It was owned by GE Americom until 2001 when the company was sold to SES (Société Européenne des Satellites). The name of the spacecraft was then changed by SES Americom to AMC-2 later in 2001.

== Overview ==
GE-2 carries 24 Ku-band and 24 C-band transponders. It weighs approximately 2,648 kg (5,838 lb) fully fueled and has a dry mass of 1,300 kg (2,900 lb). It is stationed at approximately 81° West serving North America. There is also a plan to relocate the satellite to 85° West orbital position. It is powered by two deployable solar panels, which charge the batteries. It uses LEROS-1c engines for propulsion.
