= INVAP =

Argentine technology company

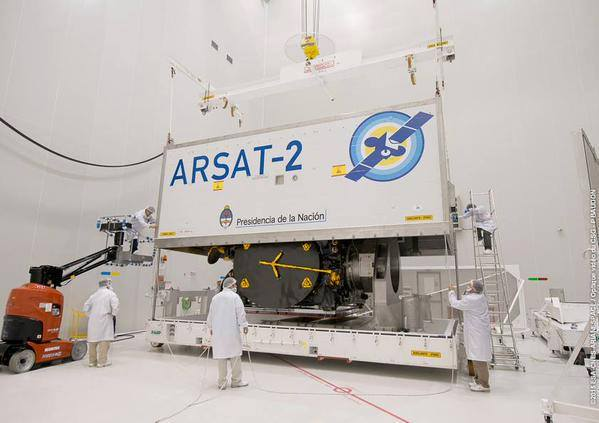
- ARSAT-2 being stored for transfer to French Guiana.
- Type: Government owned corporation
- Industry: Aerospace, nuclear energy, communications, defence
- Founded: September 1, 1976; 50 years ago
- Headquarters: Bariloche, Argentina
- Key people: Hugo Albani (President)
- Owner: Río Negro Province government
- Subsidiaries: Black River Technology
- Website: invap.com.ar

INVAP S.E. is an Argentine company that provides design, integration, construction and delivery of equipment, plants and devices. The company operates in North America, Europe, Asia Pacific, Latin America, the Middle East and Africa, and delivers projects for nuclear, aerospace, chemical, medical, petroleum and governmental sectors.

The company is an unlisted private company, the sole owner being the Province of Río Negro. Its headquarters is in San Carlos de Bariloche. As of 2023, INVAP employs some 1,700 employees, 80% of which are professionals and specialists in their field of expertise.

In 2018 the company was avowed as the most important business from Argentina, winning the Diamond Konex Award.

== Background ==
INVAP was created on September 1, 1976, as a spin-off of the Argentine Atomic Energy Commission, research laboratories division. The name INVAP is a portmanteau of the words investigación aplicada ("applied research" in Spanish).

== Satellites ==
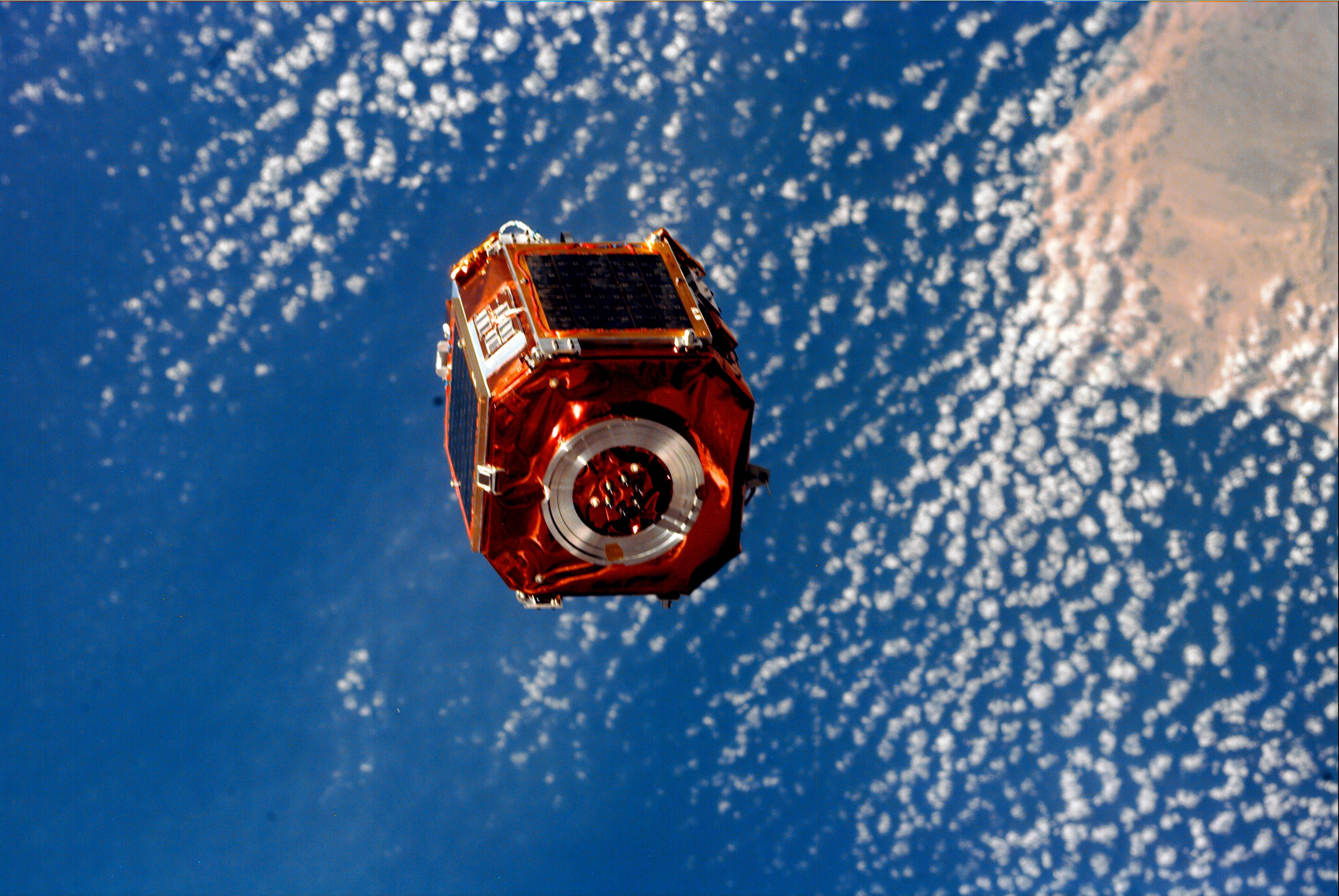
SAC-A satellite in space

INVAP was the first company in Latin America certified by NASA (the US (National) Aeronautics and Space Administration) to supply space technologies. It constructs satellites, payloads, and ground stations, including the SAC ("Satelites de Aplicación Científica") satellite family, developed for the Argentine space agency CONAE. INVAP was the first company in Latin America to provide design, development, mission control and operational support.

The SAC-D was put into orbit on June 9, 2011, carrying several scientific payloads, including NASA's $100 million Aquarius project, which will measure the oceans' salinity. ARSAT-1 - the first communications satellite entirely built in Argentina - was launched in 2014, while a second satellite in the series, ARSAT-2 was launched in September 2015.

== Nuclear projects ==
In the field of nuclear projects, the company specializes in the design and construction of nuclear research reactors, radioisotope production plants, nuclear fuel manufacturing plants, uranium enrichment facilities, neutron beam transport systems, radiation protection instrumentation, reactor protection systems, and modernization and refurbishment of research reactors. INVAP also conducts consultancy and research activities for nuclear power plant suppliers in areas such as nuclear reactor fuels, laser isotope separation, and reactor core reshuffling studies for nuclear power plants.

INVAP has constructed and installed the following nuclear reactors:

Country	Location	Name	Notes
Algeria	Algiers	NUR	Sold to Haut Commisariat pour la Recherche of the Algerian government.
Argentina	Bariloche	RA-6	For CNEA.
Argentina	Pilcaniyeu	RA-8	For CNEA.
Argentina	Lima, Zárate	CAREM	For CNEA.
Australia	Sydney	OPAL	Sold to the Australian Nuclear Science and Technology Organisation (ANSTO).
Egypt	Cairo	ETRR-2	Sold to the Egyptian Atomic Energy Authority.
Peru	Lima	RP-0	Provision of nuclear instrumentation to the Instituto Peruano de Energía Nuclear.
Peru	Huarangal	RP-10	Provision of nuclear instrumentation to the Instituto Peruano de Energía Nuclear.
Netherlands	Petten	PALLAS	For Pallas foundation.

In 2009, INVAP and the Spanish group Isolux were pre-selected in an international tender, known as the PALLAS project. This entailed the procurement of an 80 MW nuclear reactor for the Dutch city of Petten (see Petten nuclear reactor), but in February 2010, the Dutch radiopharmaceutical producer Nuclear Research and Consultancy Group (NRG) extended the preparatory phase up to end of the year for financing.

In 2010, INVAP and CITEDEF completed the development and readied for testing a method that used a laser to remove the radioactive components from heavy water which is used to cool nuclear reactors.

On the 24th of January, 2018, INVAP won the international tender for a nuclear research reactor and radioisotope production facility for medical uses in The Netherlands.

== Other projects ==
Civilian

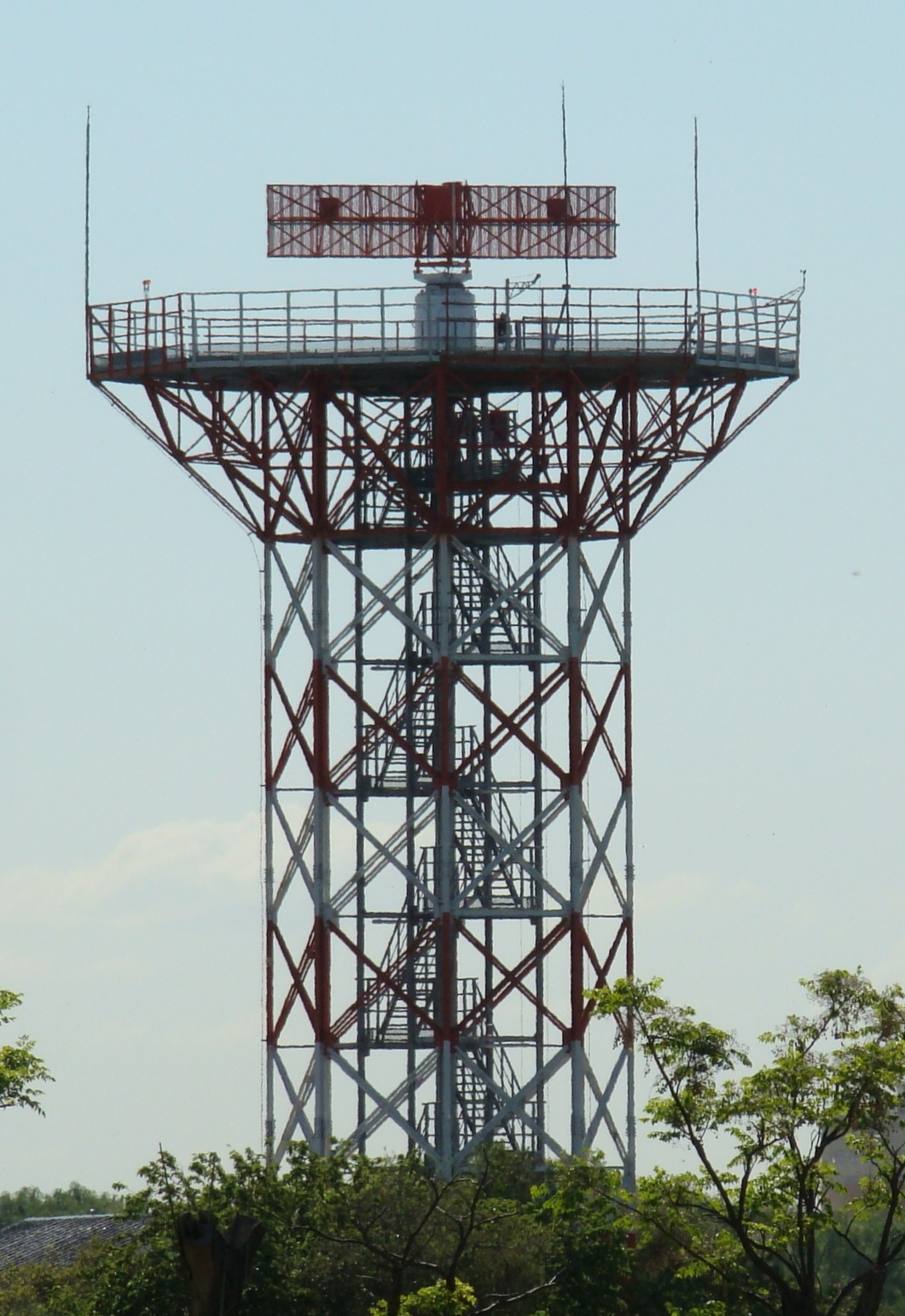
Radar Inkan at Quilmes

- TDA - Design and implementation of the public terrestrial Argentine digital TV project
- Satellites and space research payload for CONAE
- Systems for early detection of forest fires
- Eleven (plus 11 more in order) 2D radars INKAN (Spanish: Radar Secundario Monopulso Argentino, RSMA) for the Administración Nacional de Aviación Civil (ANAC) the Argentine Civilian Agency in charge of air traffic control
- Wind power
- Dry-freeze plants, for preservation of fruits and vegetables.
- Storage solutions for irradiated nuclear fuel from NPP and Research Reactors.
- Radioisotope processing plants
- Petrochemical plants.
- CAREM nuclear reactors for nuclear power generating and to propel future Argentine Nuclear Powered Submarine (SNA).

Military

- Hangar doors for the Argentine Navy destroyer Hércules
- FLIR system for Argentine Navy P-3 Orion aircraft
- Sonar systems for Argentine Navy destroyers, frigates and future Nuclear Powered submarine.
- 3D radar prototype plus 6 in order for the Argentine Air Force
- Maritime patrol simulators
- Naval electronics and battle management systems for Argentine Navy Meko 360 type destroyers, MEKO 140 type frigates, and TR-1700 submarines.
- A synthetic aperture radar to replace the Bendix RDR-1500B on the maritime patrol aircraft Beechcraft Super King Air of the Argentine Naval Aviation

== Gallery ==
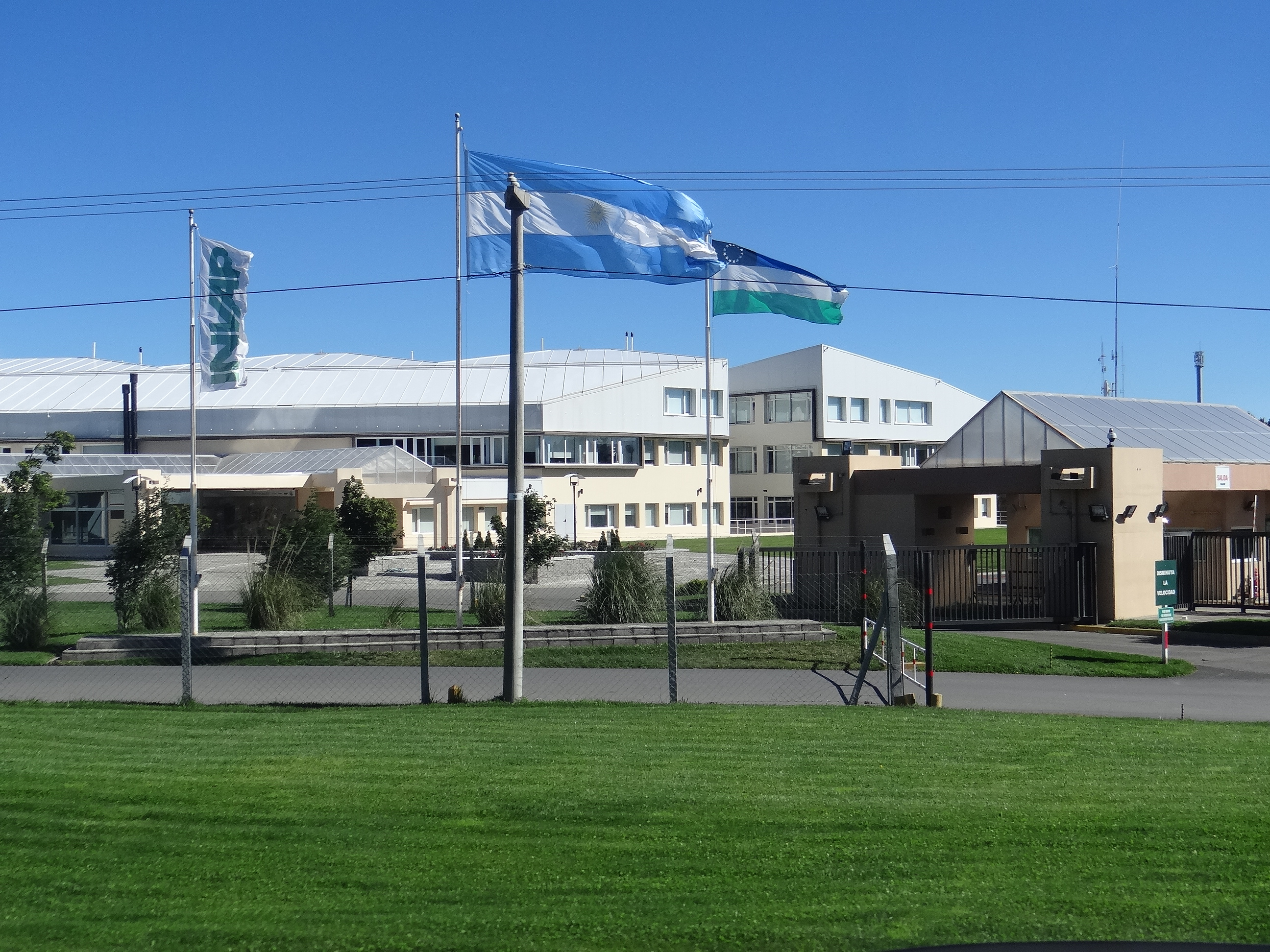

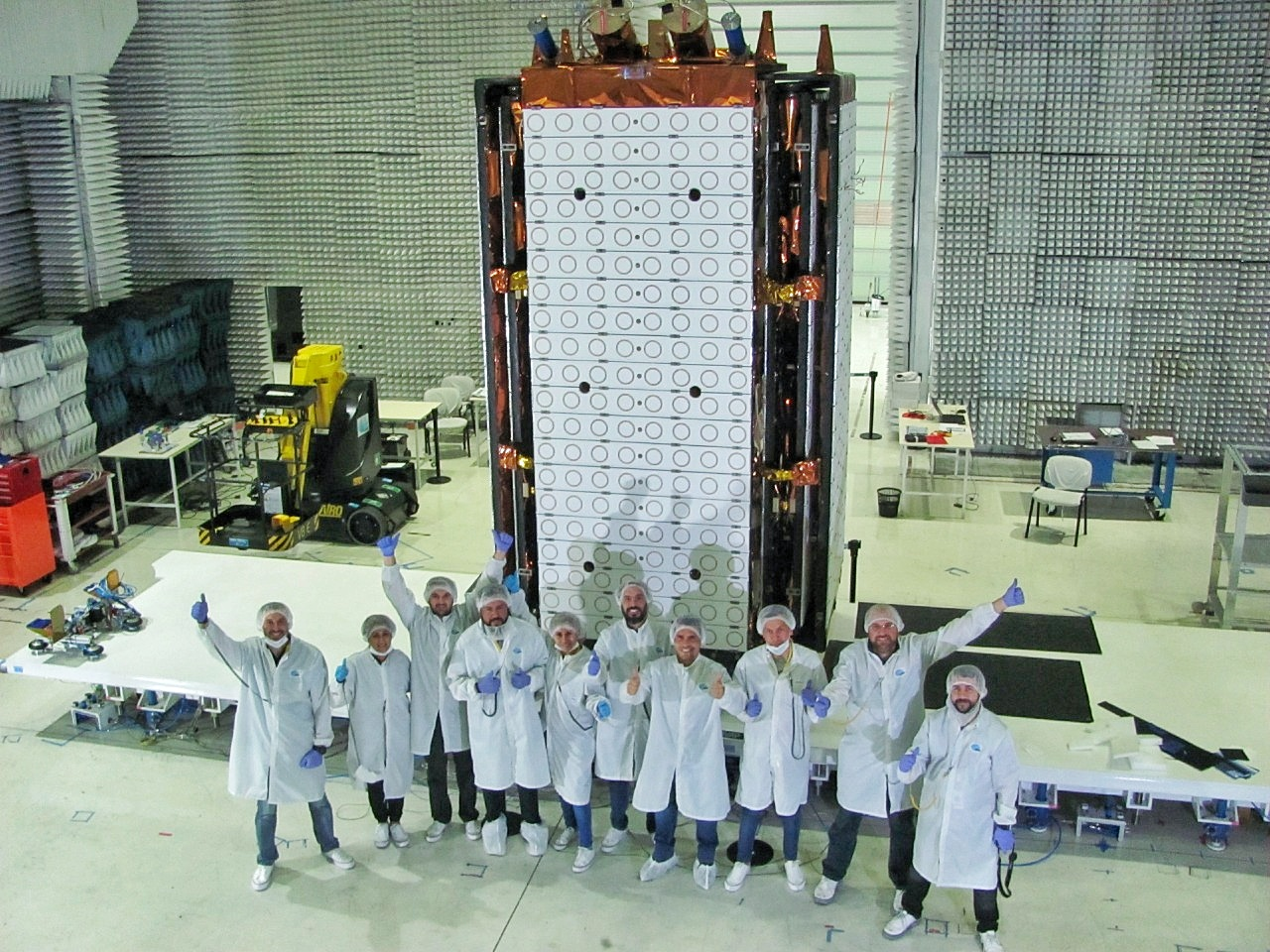

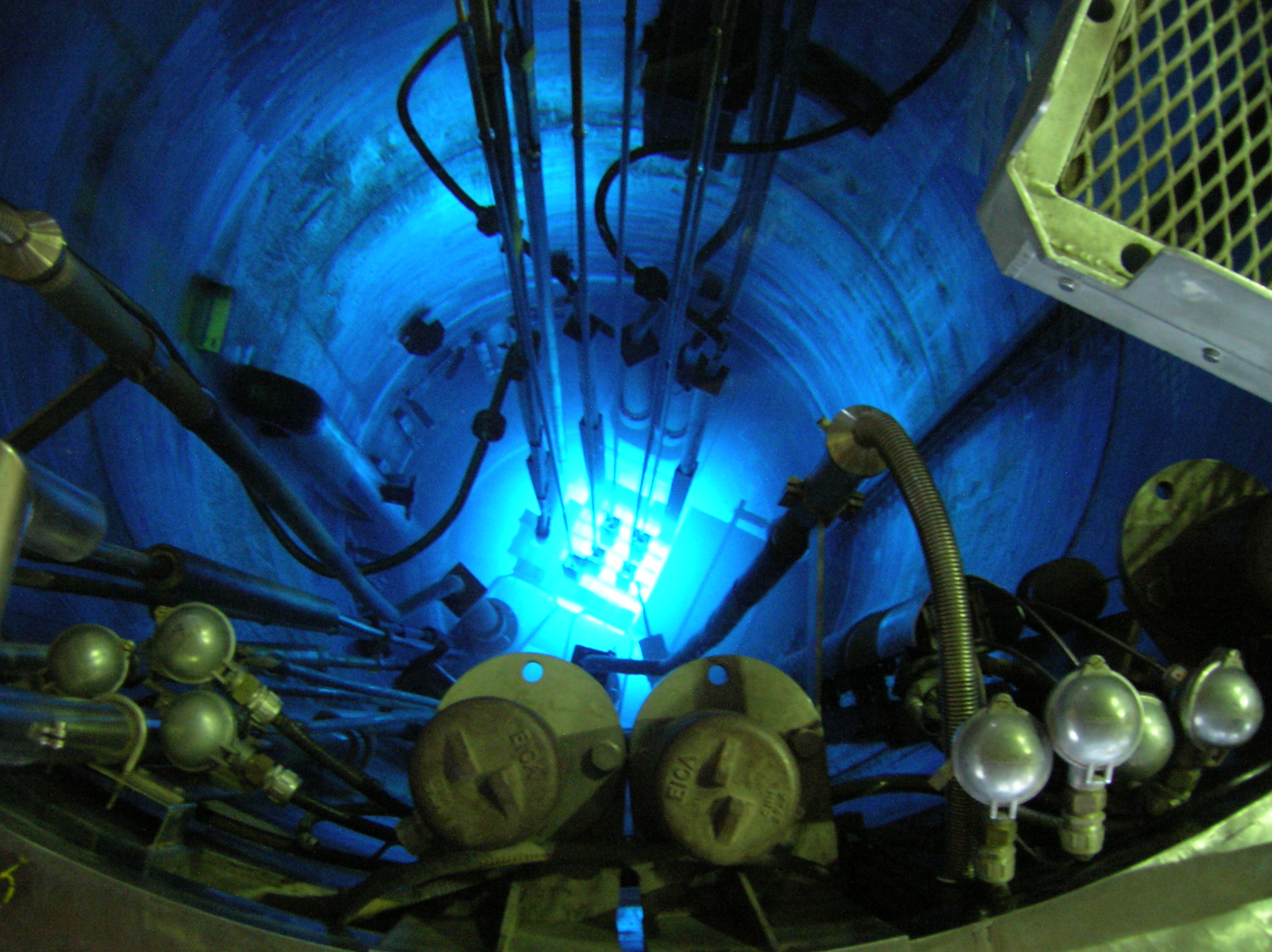

== See also ==
- CONAE - National space agency
- ARSAT - Government owned communication company
- CEATSA - Environmental testing company owned in association with ARSAT.
