= FMA IA 58 Pucará =

Counter-insurgency attack aircraft built in Argentina

IA 58 Pucará
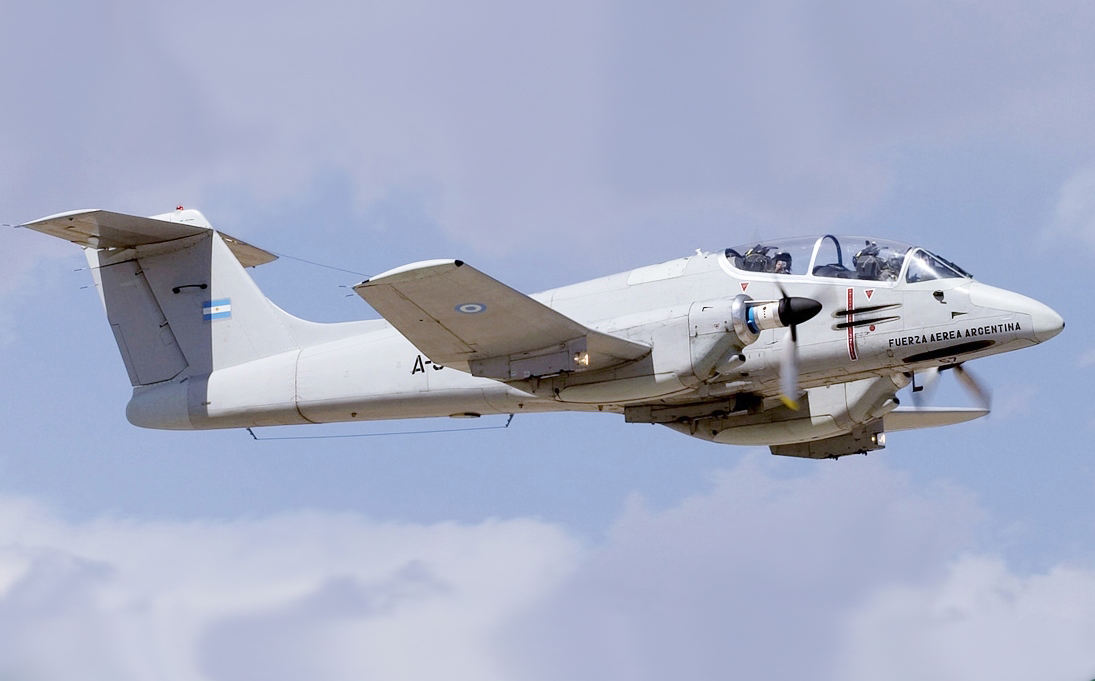
- An IA 58 Pucará of the Argentine Air Force

General information
- Type: Counter-insurgency aircraft
- National origin: Argentina
- Manufacturer: Fábrica Militar de Aviones
- Status: In service
- Primary users: Argentine Air Force Sri Lanka Air Force (historical); Uruguayan Air Force (historical)
- Number built: 110

History
- Manufactured: 1974–1993
- Introduction date: May 1975
- First flight: 20 August 1969

The FMA IA 58 Pucará (Quechua: Fortress) is an Argentine ground-attack and counter-insurgency (COIN) aircraft manufactured by the Fábrica Militar de Aviones. It is a low-wing twin-turboprop all-metal monoplane with retractable landing gear, capable of operating from unprepared strips when operationally required. The type saw action during the Falklands War and the Sri Lankan Civil War.

== Development ==
In August 1966 the Argentine state aircraft factory, Dirección Nacional de Fabricación e Investigación Aeronáutica (DINFIA), began development of the AX-2, a Counter-insurgency (COIN) aircraft to meet a requirement of the Argentine Air Force. The project was promoted by engineer Ricardo Olmedo and became under the guidance of engineer Aníbal Dreidemie, who also designed the IA-52 Guaraní II and the IA-63 Pampa. The chosen layout was a low-wing monoplane powered by two turboprop engines mounted in wing-mounted nacelles and fitted with a T-tail. In order to test the proposed layout, DINFIA first built a full-scale unpowered glider test vehicle, which flew for the first time on 26 December 1967.

Testing of the glider showed no major handling problems, and in September 1968, construction began on a powered prototype, given the designation FMA IA 58 Delfín, but later renamed Pucará, to be powered by a pair of 674 kilowatts (904 hp) Garrett TPE331I/U-303 engines. (DINFIA had been renamed the Fábrica Militar de Aviones (FMA) earlier that year). The first prototype made its maiden flight on 20 August 1969, with a second prototype, with power switching to 729 kW (978 shp) Turbomeca Astazou XVIGs, following on 6 September 1970. The first prototype was later re-engined with the Astazou, this engine being chosen for the production version, and a third production prototype followed in 1973. The first production model flew on 8 November 1974, with deliveries beginning in early 1976.

At least three projects were related to the IA-58 development. The first was an extended Pucará airframe with pressurized cabin for six passengers, equipped with Astafan turbofan engines for light transport and photography duties. The second was an observation and reconnaissance aircraft having the same configuration as the Fairchild-Republic A-10. The third was denominated IA-60 and was an advanced trainer and light attack platform powered by two Astafans conserving the basic airframe and canopy of the Pucará with T-tail incorporating high wings. Some tests were made on wind tunnels but no further development was made in order to proceed with the IA-63 Pampa program.

== Design ==
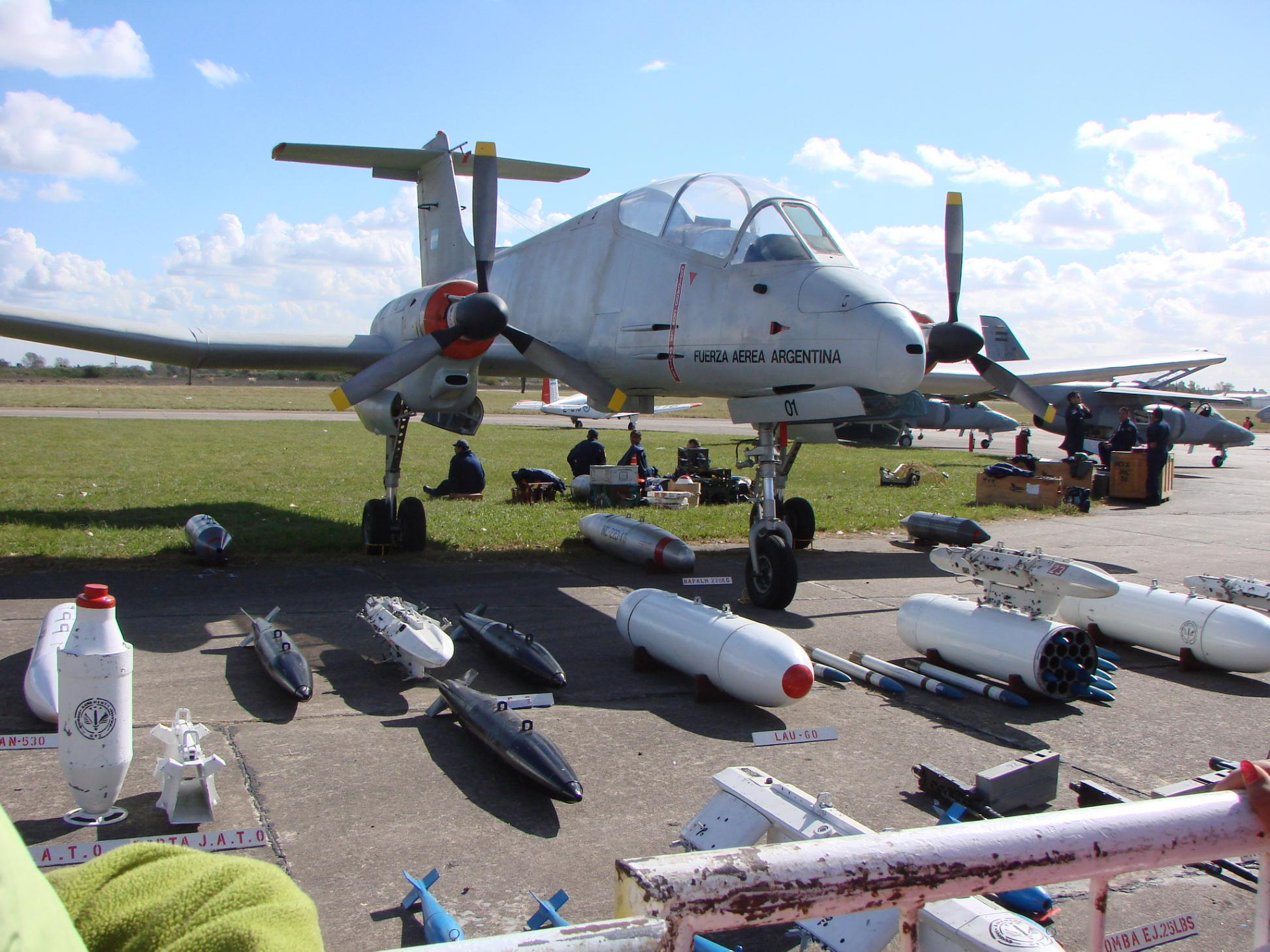
IA 58 Pucará with assorted armaments

The IA 58 Pucará is of conventional, all-metal (mainly duralumin) construction. The unswept cantilever wings have 7 degrees of dihedral on the outer panels and are fitted with slotted trailing-edge flaps. The IA-58 has a slender fuselage, with a tandem cockpit arrangement; the crew of two is seated under the upward opening clamshell canopy on Martin-Baker Mk 6AP6A zero/zero ejection seats and are provided with dual controls and good visibility, at least in the lateral and front quarters. The clean aerodynamic design allows the Pucará to reach relatively high speed, higher than the American OV-10 Bronco, another COIN aircraft. On the other hand, the IA 58 has no cargo bay inside the fuselage as requested for the American aircraft.

Armour plating is fitted to protect the crew and engines from ground fire. The aircraft is powered by a pair of Turbomeca Astazou engines, driving sets of three-bladed Ratier-Forest 23LF propellers; the propellers are also capable of being used as air brakes.

The Pucará was designed for operations from short, rough airstrips. The retractable tricycle landing gear, with a single nosewheel and twin mainwheels retracting into the engine nacelles, is fitted with low pressure tyres to suit operations on rough ground, while the undercarriage legs are tall to give good clearance for underslung weapons loads. Three JATO rockets can be fitted under the fuselage to allow extra short takeoffs. Fuel is fed from two fuselage tanks of combined capacity of 800 L (180 imp gal; 210 US gal) and two self-sealing tanks of 460 L (100 imp gal; 120 US gal) in the wings. The undercarriage, flaps and brakes are operated hydraulically, with no pneumatic systems. The spring suspension system is like the one used in the Junkers Ju 88, while the tail has a T configuration to improve take-off.

Fixed armament of the Pucará is similar to that of many WWII era aircraft. It consists of two Hispano 804 20 mm cannons mounted under the cockpit with 270 rounds each and four 7.62 mm Browning FN machine guns mounted on the sides of the fuselage with 900 rounds each. Three hardpoints are fitted for carrying external stores single or in clusters (as example up to six bombs under the fuselage or two rockets under each wing) such as bombs, rockets or external fuel tanks, with one of 1,000 kg (2,200 lb) capacity mounted under the fuselage and the remaining two, of 500 kg (1,100 lb) capacity beneath the wings. Maximum external weapons load is 1,620 kg (3,570 lb). Onboard armaments are aimed by a simple reflector sight.

== Operational history ==
The first units were delivered in May 1975 to the Argentine Air Force (Spanish: Fuerza Aérea Argentina, FAA), equipping the 2° Escuadron de Exploración y Ataque, part of the 3rd Air Brigade (Spanish: III Brigada Aérea) in Reconquista, northern Santa Fe province. They had their operational debut late in 1975, when a number of Pucarás carried out counter-insurgency strikes from Córdoba against Communist ERP guerillas in Tucumán Province as part of Operativo Independencia.

=== 1982 Falklands war ===
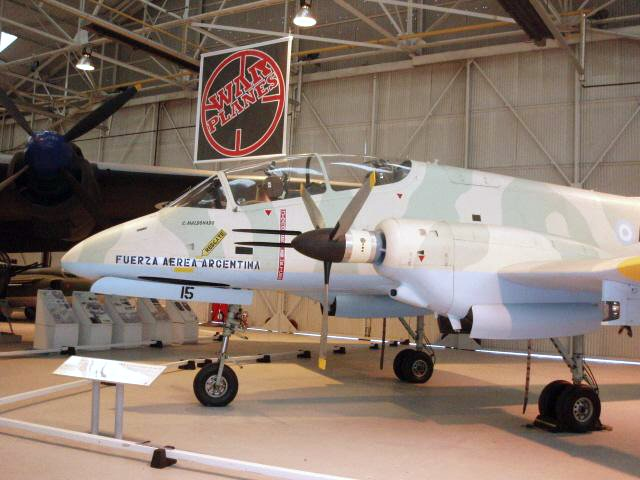
A captured Pucará on display at the Royal Air Force Museum Cosford

By the time of the Falklands War, about 60 Pucarás had been delivered. As one of the few aircraft of the Argentine service capable of flying operationally from the small airfields in the Falklands, as the runway at Port Stanley Airport was not long enough for FAA Skyhawks and Mirages to be deployed, it was decided to deploy a number of Pucarás to the Falklands, with four arriving at Port Stanley on 2 April 1982, and a further eight arriving on 9 April. Many of the Pucarás remaining on the mainland were moved to Puerto Santa Cruz or Comodoro Rivadavia in southern Argentina where they were closer to the Falklands if needed for reinforcements, and were used to perform coastal surveillance.

Most aircraft used in combat were armed with unguided bombs, 2.75 inch rocket pods, or 7.62 mm machine gun pods. Pucarás operated from Port Stanley airport and two small grass improvised airfields at Goose Green and Pebble Island. They were used in the reconnaissance and light-attack role.

Three Pucarás were destroyed and one of their pilots killed at Goose Green by cluster bombs dropped by 800 NAS Sea Harriers on 1 May 1982. Six more were destroyed in the SAS Raid on Pebble Island on 15 May 1982.

On 21 May a Pucará was lost to a Stinger SAM fired by D Squadron SAS (the first Stinger launched in combat) and another to 30 mm cannon rounds from Cmdr Nigel Ward's RN Sea Harrier, the latter after leading a successful two-aircraft raid on a shed allegedly used as an observation post by British forces. The aircraft was surprisingly tough, as Ward observed no fewer than 20 cannon hits before the target started to fall to earth. The other Pucará, piloted by Lt Juan Micheloud, made good its escape after being chased by Lt Cdr Alasdair Craig's Sea Harrier. Major Carlos Tomba, the pilot of the aircraft shot down by Cmdr Ward, survived the ejection and was recovered by friendly forces.

Two Pucarás shot down a Royal Marines Scout helicopter with 7.62 mm machine gun fire on 28 May, while it was on a casualty evacuation mission during the Battle of Goose Green. This was the only confirmed Argentine air-to-air victory of the war. One of these Pucarás crashed into Blue Mountain on the return flight to Port Stanley and was destroyed—the body of the pilot (Lt Miguel Gimenez) was found in 1986, and was buried with military honours at Port Darwin by his family, the first Argentine relatives to visit the Falklands since the end of the war.

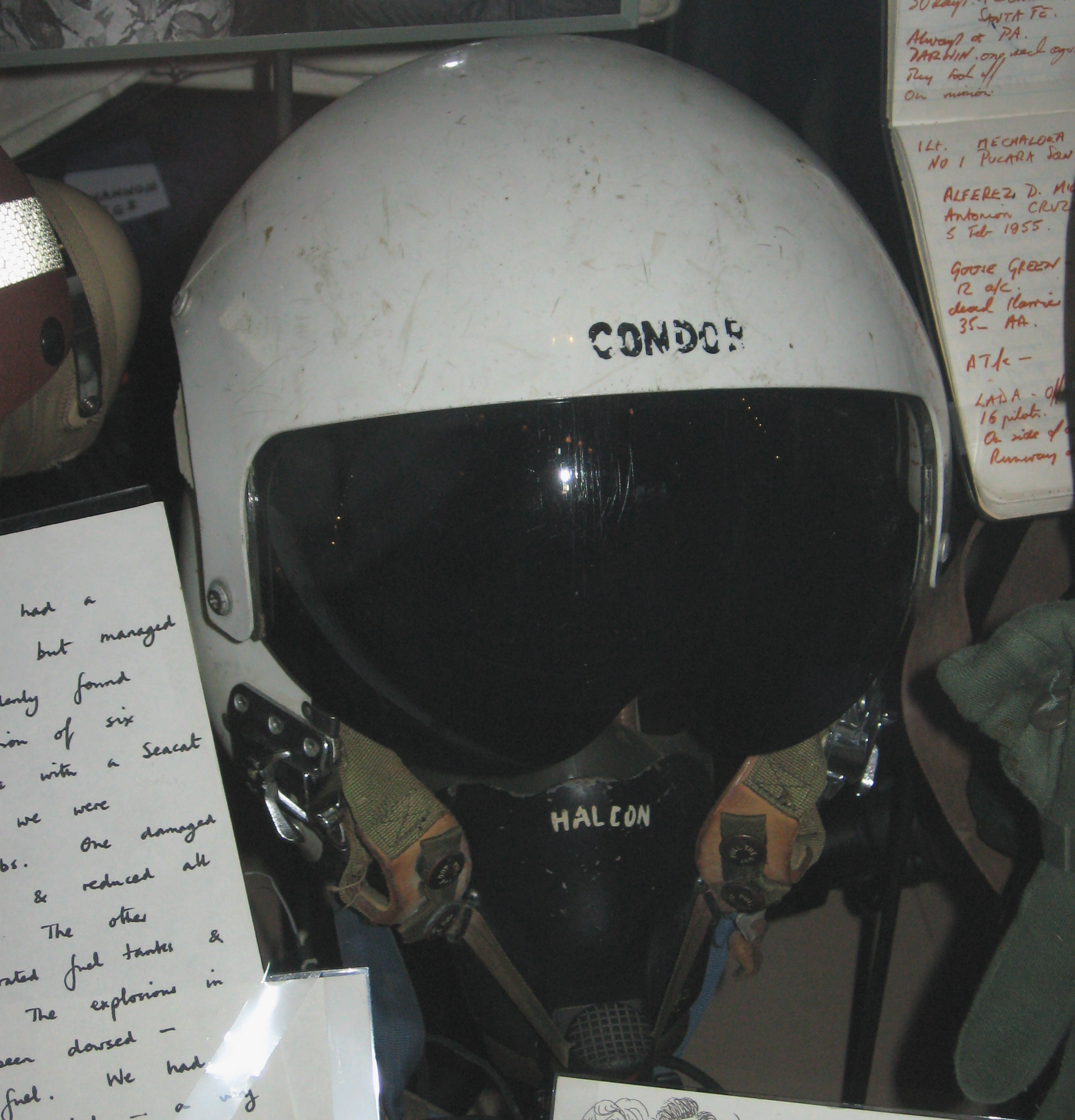
Helmet of pilot shot down by small arms fire from 2 PARA during the Falklands War

Also on the 28 May 2 Para shot down a Pucará with small arms fire after it launched rockets on British troops (without causing any casualties), during the Battle of Goose Green. Lt Miguel Cruzado ejected and became a POW.

On 11 June, in the course of the assault of the PARA 3 battalion on Mount Longdon, a package of three Pucarás launched a sortie against British artillery positions in a combined operation with the 3rd Artillery Group (GA3) of the Argentine Army.

==== Captured aircraft ====
After the Argentine surrender, eleven Pucarás (four of them in flying condition) were captured by British forces, and six were taken back to the United Kingdom.

=== Sri Lankan Civil War ===
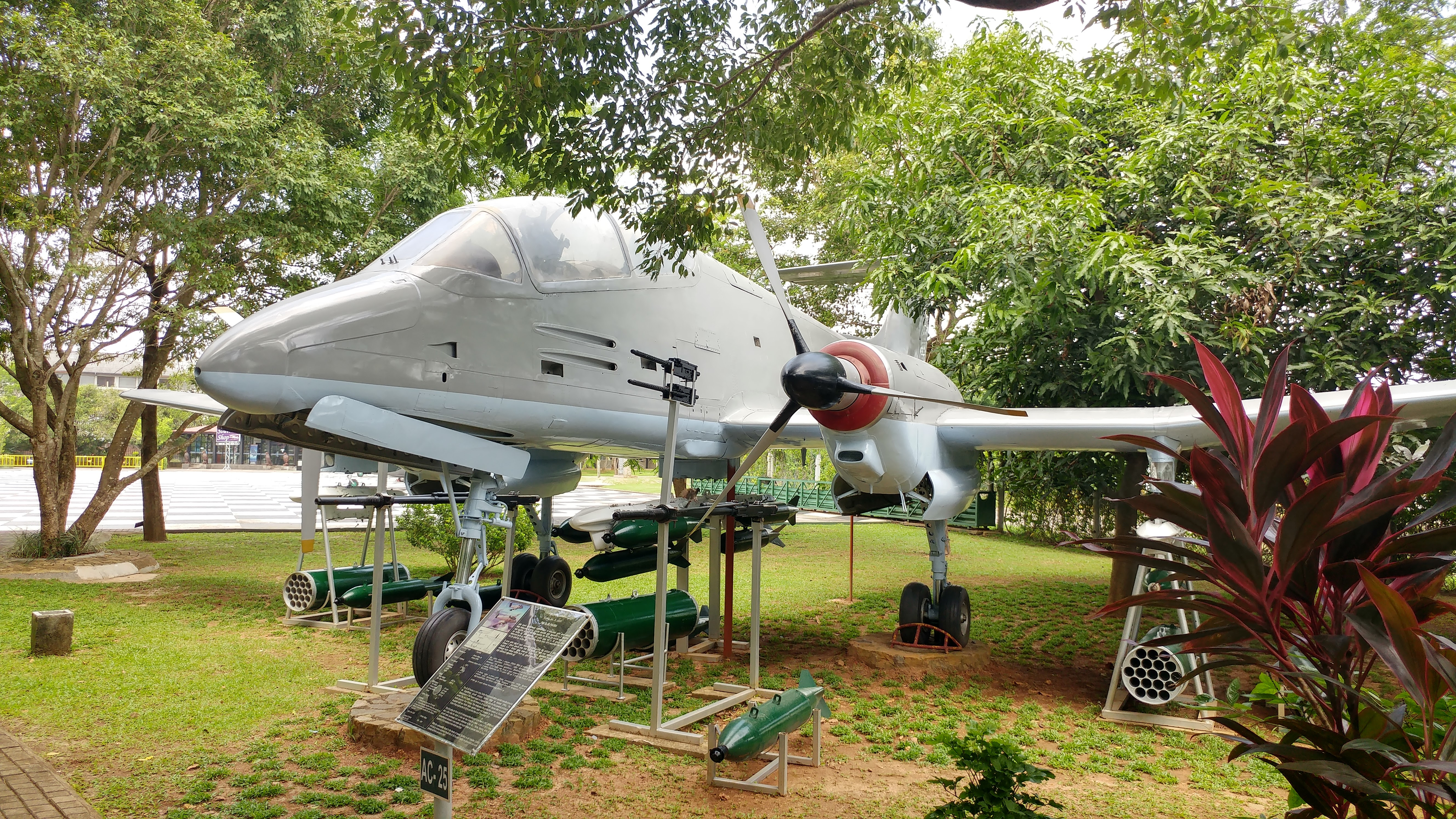
The SLAF Pucara (CA-605) on display at the Sri Lanka Air Force Museum

The Sri Lanka Air Force in search for an aircraft for counter-insurgency operations and facing refusal of military supplies from western countries who were its traditional military suppliers, purchased two Pucarás from the Argentine Air Force. They were attached to the No 1 Flying Training based at SLAF Anuradhapura and were issued SLAF serials CA-601 and CA-602. Following initial training, Pucarás were used for advanced pilot training with two pilots, and combat sorties with a single pilot. In 1993, two more aircraft, CA-604 and CA-605, were added. Pucarás were found to be highly effective for the Sri Lanka Air Force as they had high payload capacity and suitable cruising speed for close air support.

Operating mainly out of SLAF Anuradhapura, at times Pucarás were detached to its forward base at SLAF Palaly, providing close air support for the Sri Lanka Army notably during Operation Riviresa. The Sri Lanka Air Force also deployed Pucarás for maritime patrolling. CA-605 was hit by ground fire over the Kilaly lagoon, but managed to land at SLAF Palaly; it is on display at the Sri Lanka Air Force Museum. During fierce fighting in the Northern Province during Operation Leap Forward, CA-601 was shot down by a MPADS in July 1995, killing its pilot Flight Lieutenant Dilhan Perera. CA-604 was destroyed while on a night bombing sortie from what appears to have been a premature ordnance detonation; its pilot Flight Lieutenant R. A. U. P. Rajapaksa ejected safely. Following the accident the sole remaining aircraft, CA-602, was retired in 1997 with Mil Mi-24 helicopter gunships taking over the role of close air support, followed by Mikoyan MiG-27s.

The Pucará's lack of an oxygen system, limiting it to low altitudes, and lack of counter-measures against SAMs proved it be its main limitations. Problems with the Pucará were raised due to lack of acquiring adequate spare parts and the plane suffering from corrosion.

=== Upgrades ===
In May 1982, at the peak of the Falklands War, the Argentine Air Force, in collaboration with the Navy, outfitted a prototype, AX-04, with pylons to mount Mark 13 torpedoes. The aim was its possible production as a torpedo bomber to enhance the anti-ship capabilities of the Argentine air forces. Several trials were performed off Puerto Madryn, over Golfo Nuevo, but the war ended before the technicians could evaluate the feasibility of the project.

Several attempts were made to upgrade the entire fleet, including the Pucará Charlie conversion, Pucará 2000 and Pucará Bravo (modernization of 40 units was ordered and later cancelled by the FAA; only one unit was converted). These were cancelled during the 1980s due to shortage of funds.

The Uruguayan Air Force updated its fleet with the incorporation of Litton LTN-211 and GPS omega navigation systems. Minor structure modifications were made in order to carry the Mk. 82 Snakeye bomb and 1000-litre drop tank. Other avionics incorporated were the WX-500 Stormscope by L3 Communications and LED Sandel SN3500 backlit display navigation.

In 2007 an IA-58 of the Argentine Air Force was converted to carry a modified engine operating on soy-derived bio-jet fuel. The project, financed and directed by the Argentine Government (Secretaría de Ciencia Tecnología e Innovación Productiva de la Nación), made Argentina the second nation in the world to propel an aircraft with biojet fuel. The project's intention was to make the FAA less reliant on fossil fuels.

Since 2009 an extensive upgrade of the avionics and major overhaul of the airframes has been carried out by the FAA and FAdeA, creating the IA-58D Pucará Delta. The avionics for the cockpit are as close as possible to the FMA IA-63 Pampa Phase II. Some of the updated components include a new set of communications hardware, DME, ELT, IFF, GPS, Electronic Attitude Director Indicator, Electronic Horizontal Situation Indicator, RWR, HUD, DEFA 554 cannon and new PT6A-62 950shp engine instead of the original Turbomeca Astazou. The overhaul is intended to keep Argentinian Pucarás in use until 2045. Bureaucratic and economic issues caused delays to the conversion of the entire fleet. The Uruguayan Air Force also showed interest in the maintenance, repair, and overhaul (MRO) program and installation of new engines offered by FAdeA.

As of April 2016, Fábrica Argentina de Aviones "Brigadier San Martin" S.A. (FAdeA), successor to Fábrica Militar de Aviones, was in the process of modernizing twenty of the Argentine Air Force's fleet of Pucaras. The first prototype flew in November 2015.

In 2019 Argentina retired the Pucará from counterinsurgency light strike operation, converting it to the Pucará Fénix border surveillance and patrol aircraft, with improved Pratt & Whitney Canada PT-6A-62 engines, new four-bladed propellers, a podded Fixview electro-optical/infrared (EO/IR) sensor turret, and data link. The upgrade was authorised in December 2021, with the Fénix expected to be in operation for at least 15 years.

=== Failed contracts ===
The Peruvian Air Force was reported in mid 1972 to have shown great interest in acquiring up to 25 IA-58A for delivery in 1974.

The first foreign contract was in February 1978 with the Islamic Air Force of Mauritania for four IA-58A planes plus support and training at a full cost of U$10.8 million. Another eight units were also negotiated as options. When Mauritanian President Moktar Ould Daddah was ousted in a coup d'état, the contract was cancelled. The plane series n°015 to n°018 were built and ready to ship with Mauritanian registration numbers. They were incorporated to the Argentine Air Force as A-515 to A-518 keeping the desert camouflage and configuration.

In March 1983, negotiations for two Pucarás were going with Central African Republic Air Force for US$9.5 million including support, training and spare parts. The contract was cancelled.

In September 1983, another contract was signed, this time with the Venezuelan Air Force for 24 IA-58A equipped with Garrett TPE331-11-601W turboprop engines, at U$110 million. Venezuela cancelled the purchase order. A number of OV-10A Broncos were negotiated and later incorporated from United States Air Force stocks instead, with credit facilities.

In March 1985, a new contract with the Iraqi Air Force, which was later disbanded due political foreign issues, was signed with Iraq for 20 IA-58A with 20 more on option for U$76 million.

In May 1986 the Bolivian Air Force requested 12 IA-58A for U$52 million, with no purchase orders placed.

Iran negotiated 60 IA-58A for U$283 million by April 1987 and at the end of that year a new deal for 50 planes at U$160 million with no purchase orders ever placed.

In November 1987, six Pucarás were negotiated with the Force Aérienne Zairoise for US$26.7 million, contract cancelled.

In 1990 the Brazilian Air Force announced a purchase of 30 IA-58A as part of the SIVAM project. But with the development of the Embraer EMB 314 Super Tucano, the order was cancelled.

In 1991 a purchase order was negotiated by the Paraguayan Air Force for four IA-58A at U$10.6 million but later disregarded.

== Variants ==
- AX-02 Delfín: Prototype.
- AX-04: A torpedo-carrying prototype.
- IA-58A Pucará: Two-seat counter-insurgency, close air support, attack aircraft. Main production version. To be retired September 2019.
- IA-58B Pucará Bravo: Modified two-seat counter-insurgency aircraft, with deeper forward fuselage, allowing the 20 mm Hispano cannon to be replaced by two 30 mm DEFA cannons, and with more advanced avionics. One prototype aircraft converted from IA-58A first flew on 15 May 1979.
- IA-58C Pucará Charlie: Single-seat version designed to take advantage of lessons learned during the Falklands War, with increased capability in anti-shipping and anti-helicopter missions. Forward cockpit removed, with additional 30 mm DEFA cannon supplementing existing gun armament, and capability to carry Matra R550 Magic air-to-air missiles and Martin Pescador air-to-surface missiles underwing. Increased armour protection fitted, and more advanced EW system suite. Single prototype converted, flying on 30 December 1985, but plans to convert fifteen more for the Argentine Air Force abandoned in 1988 due to lack of funding.
- IA-58D Pucará Delta: Current program modernisation of existing IA-58A airframes, featuring new avionics systems and 950 shp (710 kW) PT6A-62 Pratt & Whitney engines. Also noted as IA-58H. Program restarted in June 2019 with certification planned in July 2019.
- IA-66: Modification of IA-58A powered by two 1,000-ehp (746-kW) Garrett TPE331-11-601W turboprop engines. Single prototype converted from IA-58A flew in 1980.
- IA-58 Pucará Fénix: In 2019 Argentina retired the Pucará from counterinsurgency light strike operation, converting it to the Pucará Fénix border surveillance and patrol aircraft. The upgrade was authorised in December 2021, with the Fénix expected to be in operation for at least 15 years.

== Operators ==
=== Current operators ===
Argentina

- "Fenix" prototype tested since 2019, production approved in 2021.

=== Former operators ===
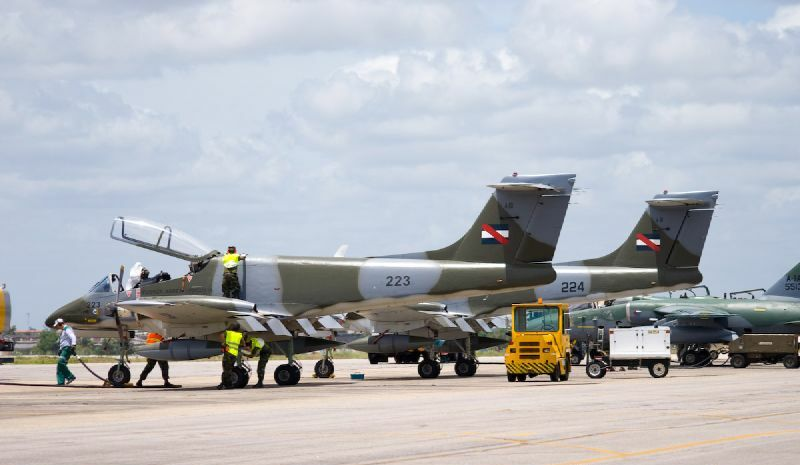
Uruguayan Air Force Pucarás

Argentina

- Argentine Air Force IA-58A variant.

Colombia

- Colombian Air Force

Sri Lanka

- Sri Lanka Air Force (1993–1999, 2 shot down, 2 retired)

United Kingdom

- Royal Air Force (A captured Pucará was evaluated at A&AEE Boscombe Down after the Falklands conflict before being donated to the RAF museum). This aircraft has since been gifted to the South Yorkshire Aircraft museum, and is displayed as part of their '11 weeks in 1982' display.

Uruguay

- Uruguayan Air Force. Retired 2017.

== Aircraft on display ==
=== Argentina ===
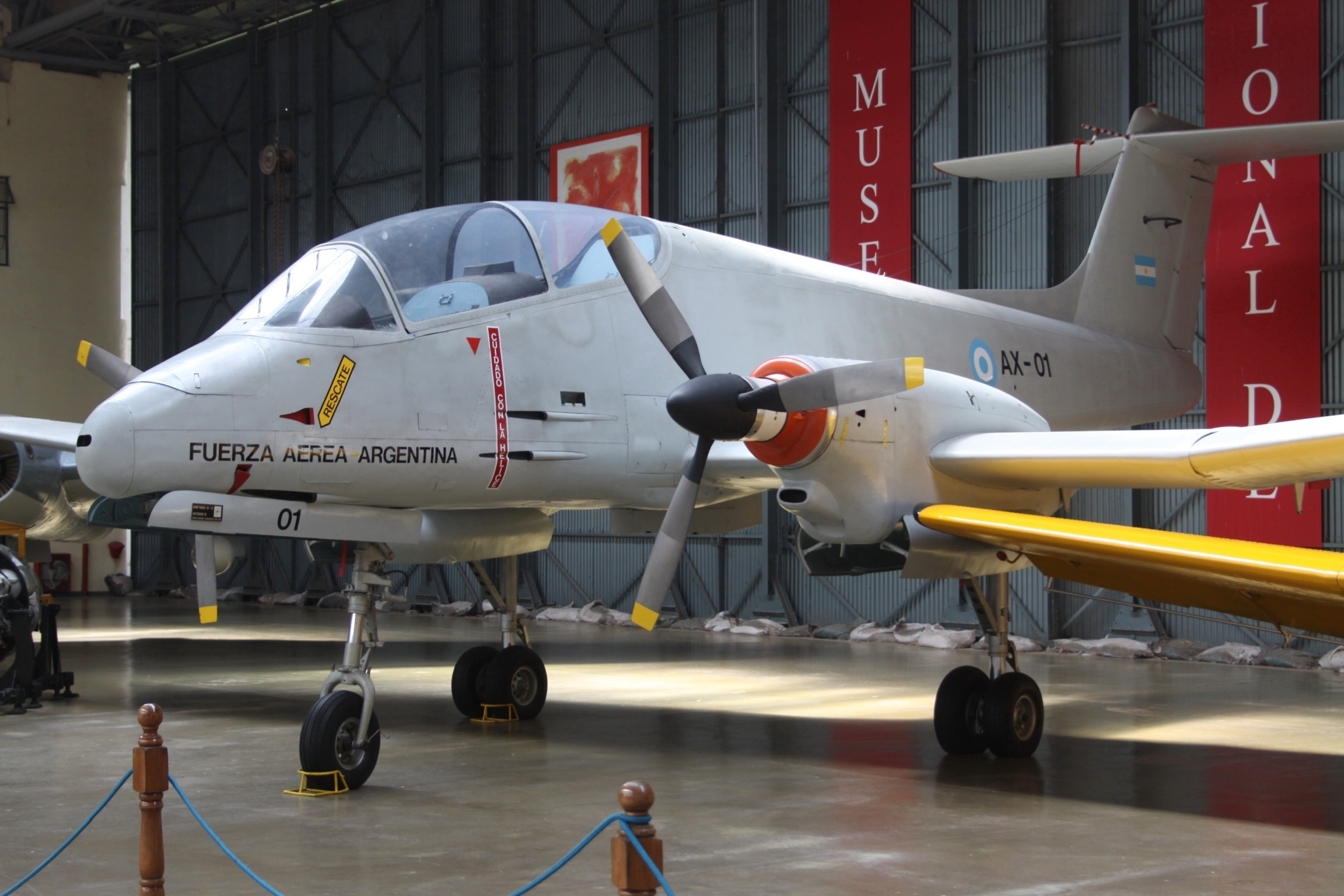
FMA IA 58 Pucará prototype AX-01

- Prototype AX-01, at Museo Nacional de Aeronautica de Argentina, Morón, Argentina

=== Sri Lanka ===
- CA-605, at Sri Lanka Air Force Museum

=== United Kingdom ===
- A-515 (ZD485/9245M) – at South Yorkshire Aircraft Museum, Doncaster. This aircraft was flown by the Aeroplane and Armament Experimental Establishment (A&AEE) at Boscombe Down in 1983 to evaluate the Pucará's performance. Given to the South Yorkshire Aircraft Museum by the RAF Museum in October 2025.
- A-522 (8768M) – at North East Land, Sea and Air Museums (on loan from the Fleet Air Arm Museum, Yeovilton)
- A-528 (8769M) – at Norfolk and Suffolk Aviation Museum (on loan from Museum of Army Flying, Middle Wallop)
- A-533 (ZD486) – at South Yorkshire Aircraft Museum, Doncaster (cockpit section only)
- A-549 (ZD487) – at Imperial War Museum Duxford

== Specifications ==
Data from Jane's Civil and Military Upgrades 1994–95

General characteristics

- Crew: two
- Length: 14.25 m (46 ft 9 in)
- Wingspan: 14.50 m (47 ft 7 in)
- Height: 5.36 m (17 ft 7 in)
- Wing area: 30.30 m^{2} (326.1 sq ft)
- Aspect ratio: 6.9:1
- Airfoil: NACA 64_{2}A215 at root, NACA64_{1} at tip
- Empty weight: 4,020 kg (8,863 lb)
- Max takeoff weight: 6,800 kg (14,991 lb)
- Fuel capacity: 1,280 L (280 imp gal; 340 US gal) internal, up to 1,736 L (382 imp gal; 459 US gal) in external tanks
- Powerplant: 2 × Turbomeca Astazou XVIG turboprop, 729 kW (978 hp) each

Performance

- Maximum speed: 500 km/h (310 mph, 270 kn) at 3,000 m (9,800 ft)
- Cruise speed: 430 km/h (270 mph, 230 kn) at 6,000 ft (1,800 m) (econ cruise)
- Stall speed: 143 km/h (89 mph, 77 kn) (flaps and undercarriage down)
- Never exceed speed: 750 km/h (470 mph, 400 kn)
- Combat range: 350 km (220 mi, 190 nmi) (Combat radius with 1,500 kg (3,300 lb) weapons, High-low-high profile)
- Ferry range: 3,710 km (2,310 mi, 2,000 nmi) max internal and external fuel
- Service ceiling: 10,000 m (33,000 ft)
- g limits: +6/-3 g
- Rate of climb: 18 m/s (3,500 ft/min)

Armament

- Guns:
  - 2× 20 mm Hispano-Suiza HS.804 autocannons
  - 4× 7.62 mm FN Browning machine guns
- Hardpoints: 3 with a capacity of centerline 1,000 kg (2,200 lb), wing pylons 500 kg (1,100 lb), total external stores 1,620 kg (3,570 lb)
- Rockets:
  - ARM-657 Mamboretá pods

== See also ==
- Argentine air forces in the Falklands War

Aircraft of comparable role, configuration, and era

- Grumman OV-1 Mohawk
- North American Rockwell OV-10 Bronco
