= Project Kahu =

New Zealand upgrade program for the A-4

Project Kahu was a major upgrade program for the A-4K Skyhawk attack aircraft operated by the Royal New Zealand Air Force (RNZAF) in the mid-1980s. Prior to the implementation of the upgrade, the A-4K Skyhawks, which had served with the RNZAF since 1970, had become dated compared to modern jet fighter aircraft.The project was named after the Māori-language name for the New Zealand swamp harrier.

== Background ==
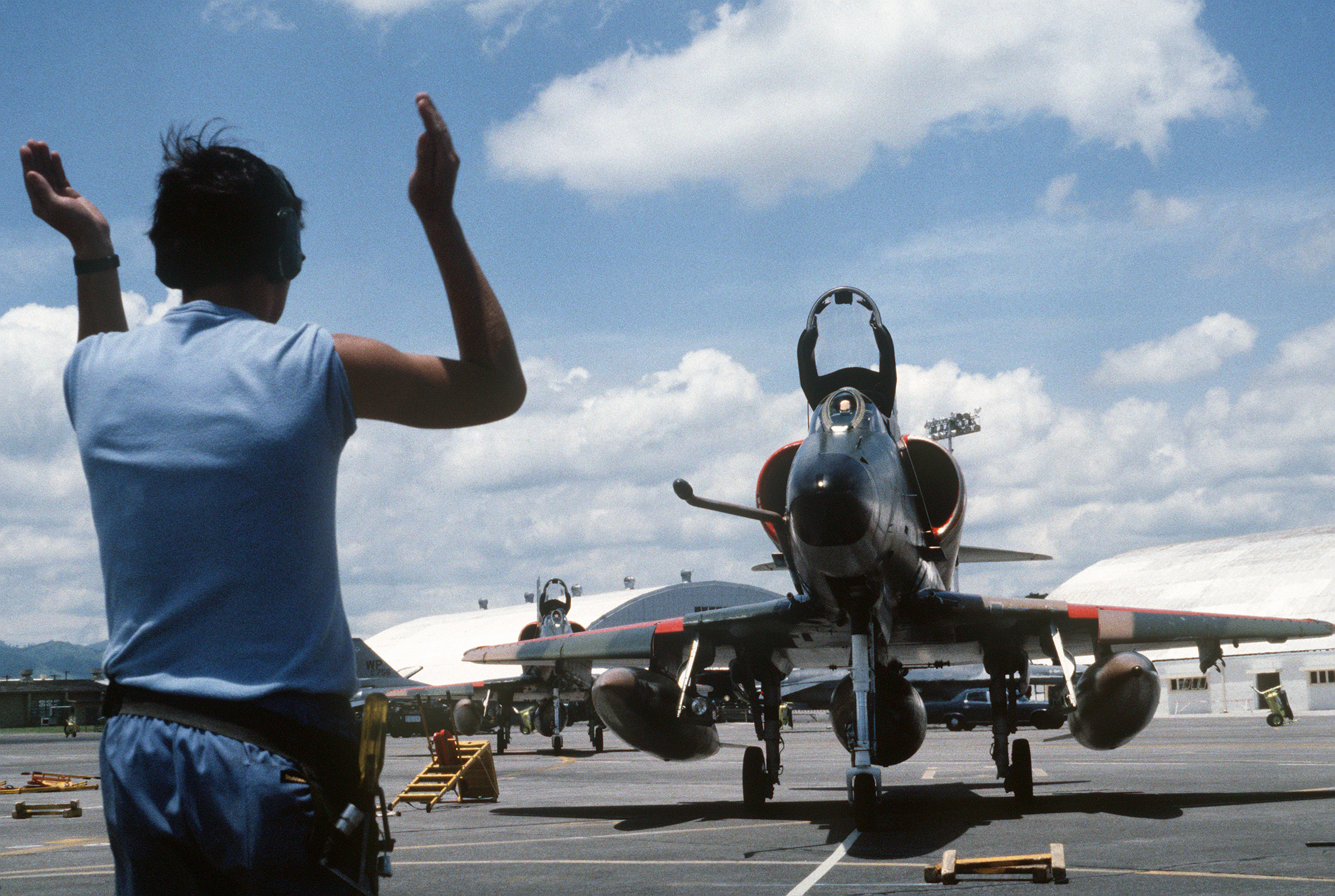
A RNZAF Skyhawk at Clark Air Base in the Philippines, in 1984

By 1982 it was increasing apparent that the Douglas A-4 Skyhawk fleet that equipped the Strike Wing of the Royal New Zealand Air Force (RNZAF) required modernisation, particularly in respect of its navigation and weapons-delivery systems. A request for a tender to modernise the Skyhawks was opened in May that year, with a proposal from the American company Lear Siegler Inc. deemed to be the most appropriate.

In 1984, the update program was in principle approved, concurrently with the purchase of ten Skyhawks from Australia; these had been serving with the Royal Australian Navy. Meanwhile, a Defence Review conducted in 1983 saw the Skyhawks take on a new role as a maritime strike force, rather than the close support role it was previously tasked with. Since this required changes in the equipment that was required for the upgrade, a new tendering process commenced, with Lear Siegler again submitting the best proposal which also covered the Skyhawks newly acquired from Australia. The New Zealand Government approved the tender, which would cost NZ$148 million, on 1 May 1985. However, it was not until March 1986 that the contract with Lear Siegler to upgrade twenty-two aircraft (ten of which being the Australian Skyhawks) was signed. The project was designated Kahu after the New Zealand swamp harrier. Prior to commencing the actual upgrade, personnel from the RNZAF's No. 75 Squadron, which operated the Skyhawks, went to the United States to liaise with Lear Siegler staff.

Lear Siegler was not the only company involved in the upgrade. Private companies in New Zealand were also engaged, including Pacific Aerospace in Hamilton, which worked on the wings, while Fisher & Paykel did electrical work. SAFE Air was another local company involved in the work, providing draughting services. The work was completed by RNZAF staff at the RNZAF's No. 1 Repair Depot at Woodbourne. Although the contract covered all twenty-two of the RNZAF's Skyhawks, only twenty-one were completed as one A-4K (NZ6210) was lost in 1989 before it was upgraded.

== Upgrade details ==
The Kahu upgrade called for the installation of nearly 30 individual avionic and weapons systems. One major system, and the single most expensive item, was the Westinghouse AN/APG-66 radar, which had a range of 80 nautical miles (150 km). This was as used in the General Dynamics F-16 Fighting Falcon but optimized for maritime tracking. Space constraints limited the size of the antenna that was able to be used although changes to the software was able to compensate for the resulting loss of antenna gain. Another was the Ferranti 4510 wide-angle Heads-up Display was added to the cockpit; this showed flight and weapon aiming information on a screen in the pilot's field of vision. This allowed pilots to fly without looking down at the instrumentation. The HUD also included a video recording system. Once the HUD and related paraphernalia was installed, it was discovered that the centre of gravity of the Skyhawk was affected. This was overcome with the addition of 106 pounds (48 kg) of weight to the tail of the aircraft.

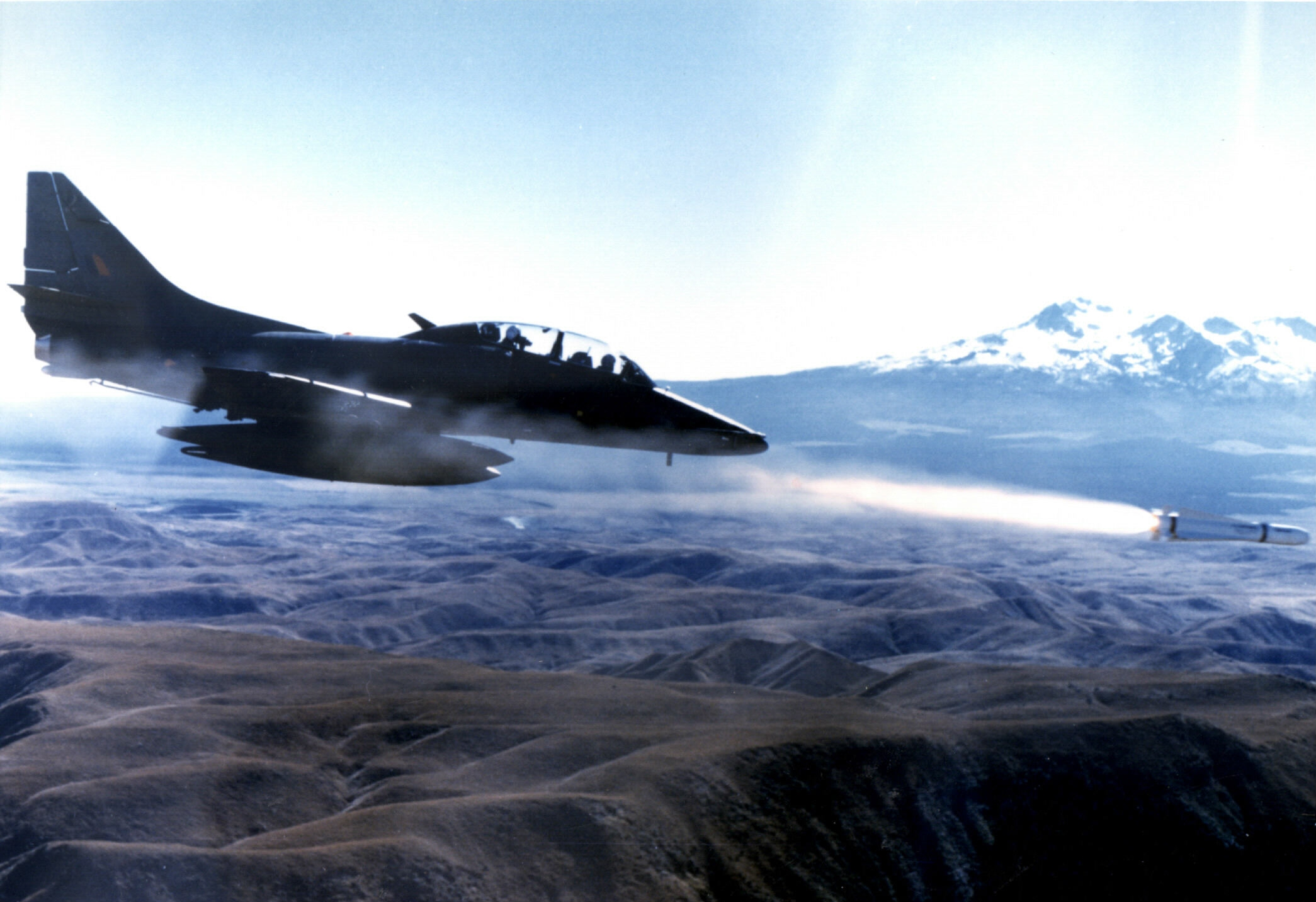
The Project Kahu upgrade allowed the RNZAF's Skyhawks to use more advanced weaponry, such as the AGM-65 Maverick missile being launched here over Waiouru training ground, 1989

A General Instrument ALR-66 radar warning receiver was installed to detect radar emissions. An ALE-39 chaff and flare dispenser, as used by the Royal Australian Air Force (RAAF) on its McDonnell Douglas F/A-18 Hornets, was added. This compatibility was useful during training exercises in Australia since chaff and flares could be readily sourced from participating RAAF squadrons. A new control stick with Hands on Throttle and Stick, consolidating multiple switches was added. A glass cockpit with two large cathode ray tube screens, a MIL-STD 1553B databus, Litton Industries LN-93 inertial navigation system were other items of equipment included in the upgrade.

Parts of the wings were reskinned and the wiring replaced. It also received armament upgrades including the ability to fire AIM-9L Sidewinders, AGM-65 Mavericks and GBU-16 Paveway II laser-guided bombs. Using advances in miniaturization, it was possible to incorporate these additional electronics items entirely within the fuselage without requiring the use of the dorsal hump. The Kahu-modified Skyhawk could be recognized by a blade-like Instrument landing system aerial antenna on the leading edge of the vertical stabilizer.

A two-seater TA-4K Skyhawk, with the tail code NZ6254, was the first aircraft to be completed and was unveiled to the public on 2 June 1988. It subsequently undertook an extensive test programme. This was conducted by Flight Lieutenant Steve Moore, who had recently become only the second RNZAF pilot to graduate from the Empire Test Pilot School in the United Kingdom. The program was completed in June 1991 when the final aircraft, NZ6202, was returned to No. 75 Squadron.

== Outcome ==
Once completed, the Kahu upgrade was largely successful, with noticeable improvements in accuracy of gunnery and bombing exercises. As of 1995, staff at the United States Foreign Military Sales support office regarded the A-4K as the "most sophisticated Skyhawk flying...the most complete aircraft right now for ground attack and air-to-air combat missions". However, the ALR-66 radar warning system never performed satisfactorily. The receivers lacked sensitivity and it was common in training that it would not be triggered by the radar guided weapons actuated by opponents. A drawback to the project was that much of the new electronics was bespoke equipment, which subsequently caused supply and maintenance problems that was exacerbated when the Skyhawks were deployed overseas.

The updated Skyhawks served in the RNZAF until late 2001, when the Strike Wing was disbanded under a new defence policy of the New Zealand Government at the time. Put into storage, eight Skyhawks were eventually sold to Draken International, which would fly them as adversary aircraft as part of their defence training contract with the United States armed forces. The remaining aircraft were donated to museums including the Air Force Museum of New Zealand, Museum of Transport & Technology, and the Fleet Air Arm Museum in Australia.

== See also ==
- (Argentina) A-4AR Fightinghawk
- (Singapore) A-4SU Super Skyhawk
