= FMA IA-63 Pampa =

Argentine jet trainer aircraft

IA-63 Pampa
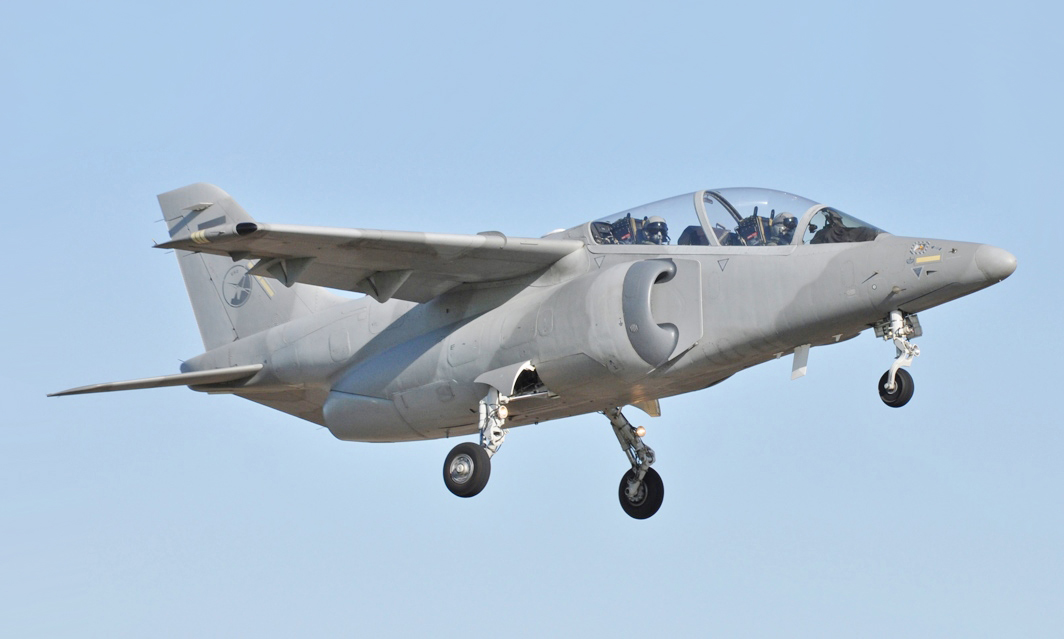
- IA-63 in flight

General information
- Type: Trainer aircraft
- National origin: Argentina
- Manufacturer: FAdeA
- Status: In service
- Primary user: Argentine Air Force
- Number built: 41

History
- Manufactured: 1984-present
- Introduction date: April 1988
- First flight: 6 October 1984

The IA-63 Pampa is an advanced jet trainer with combat capability, produced in Argentina by Fabrica Argentina de Aviones (FAdeA) with assistance from Dornier of Germany.

== Design and development ==
Preliminary design studies for a replacement for the Morane-Saulnier MS-760 of the Argentine Air Force started at the Fábrica Militar de Aviones (FMA) in 1978, with these studies resulting in selection of a proposal powered by a single Garrett TFE731 turbofan with high, unswept wings. At the same time the FMA signed a partnership agreement with Dornier to develop the new aircraft.

Although influenced by the Dassault/Dornier Alpha Jet design, the Pampa differs in being a smaller aircraft, it is also single-engined and has straight supercritical wings rather than the swept ones of the Alpha Jet. It is constructed mainly of aluminium alloy, with carbon-fibre used for components such as the air intakes. The crew of two sit in tandem under a single-piece clamshell canopy. The avionics systems are also simpler than the Franco-German aircraft, which has an important secondary combat role. The Pampa prototype first flew on 6 October 1984.

== Variants ==
IA-63
Production of the initial series has been delayed and hampered by the state of the Argentinian economy, and as a result only 18 production aircraft have been built in the first batch (1988–90) and six in the second batch (2006–07) for the Argentine Air Force. First deliveries occurred in April 1988. The 18 aircraft are in service, all modernized, with the IV Brigada Aérea (English: IV Air Brigade) at Mendoza for the advanced training role of Argentine pilots.

Vought Pampa 2000
In the 1990s, LTV/Vought selected the IA 63 as the basis for the Pampa 2000, which Vought entered into the Joint Primary Aircraft Training System competition for the United States Air Force. The Pampa 2000 lost to the Beechcraft/Raytheon entry which became the T-6 Texan II.

AT-63 Pampa "Phase 2"
With the acquisition of FMA by Lockheed Martin in 1995, the Pampa was upgraded with a new engine and a more advanced avionics package compatible with the A-4AR and weapons system. This new project was called AT-63 Pampa "Phase 2" (for attack trainer) and was marketed by Lockheed Martin.

IA-63 Pampa GT "Phase 3"
A third batch of forty new units of the redesigned Pampa was announced by FAdeA on 10 October 2013. After a long delay, finally in 2015 a prototype of the third version of the IA-63 Pampa was introduced to the press. However, rampant inflation and a severe recession have made impossible for the Argentine government to finance the manufacturing of any of the promised planes. In 2016, a new Argentinian government allowed progress to be made and the first flight of the "Pampa III" took place the same year. As of July 2017, the IA-63 Pampa III project shows few signs of progress. According to the AirForces Monthly magazine, FAdeA is considering cannibalising Pampa II aircraft withdrawn from service in order to enable completion of the three Pampa IIIs scheduled for 2017.

The Argentine Ministry of Defence reached a deal worth $30.3 million with FAdeA for the production of an additional three Phase 3 Pampas in February 2018, after the deal was first revealed in December 2017. The first Pampa III, serial E-824, made its maiden flight on 21 September 2018.

The first two Pampa III aircraft were delivered to the Argentine Air Force in February 2019. The last of a total of 6 Pampa III's was delivered on 27 March 2020.

On 3 July 2019, Guatemala signed a contract worth $28 million for two Pampa III jet trainers. This made the Guatemalan Air Force the first export customer for the Pampa III. But one day after the purchase was made, the local representative of Transparency International accused President Jimmy Morales of avoiding local legislation on public purchases. This led to the auditor general of Guatemala to cancel the purchase. According to FAdeA, they are still trying to unlock the purchase, and the Argentine government is considering taking legal actions.

LMAASA IA 63 Pampa NG
Lockheed Martin collaboration to produce updated Pampas.

== Specifications (IA 63) ==
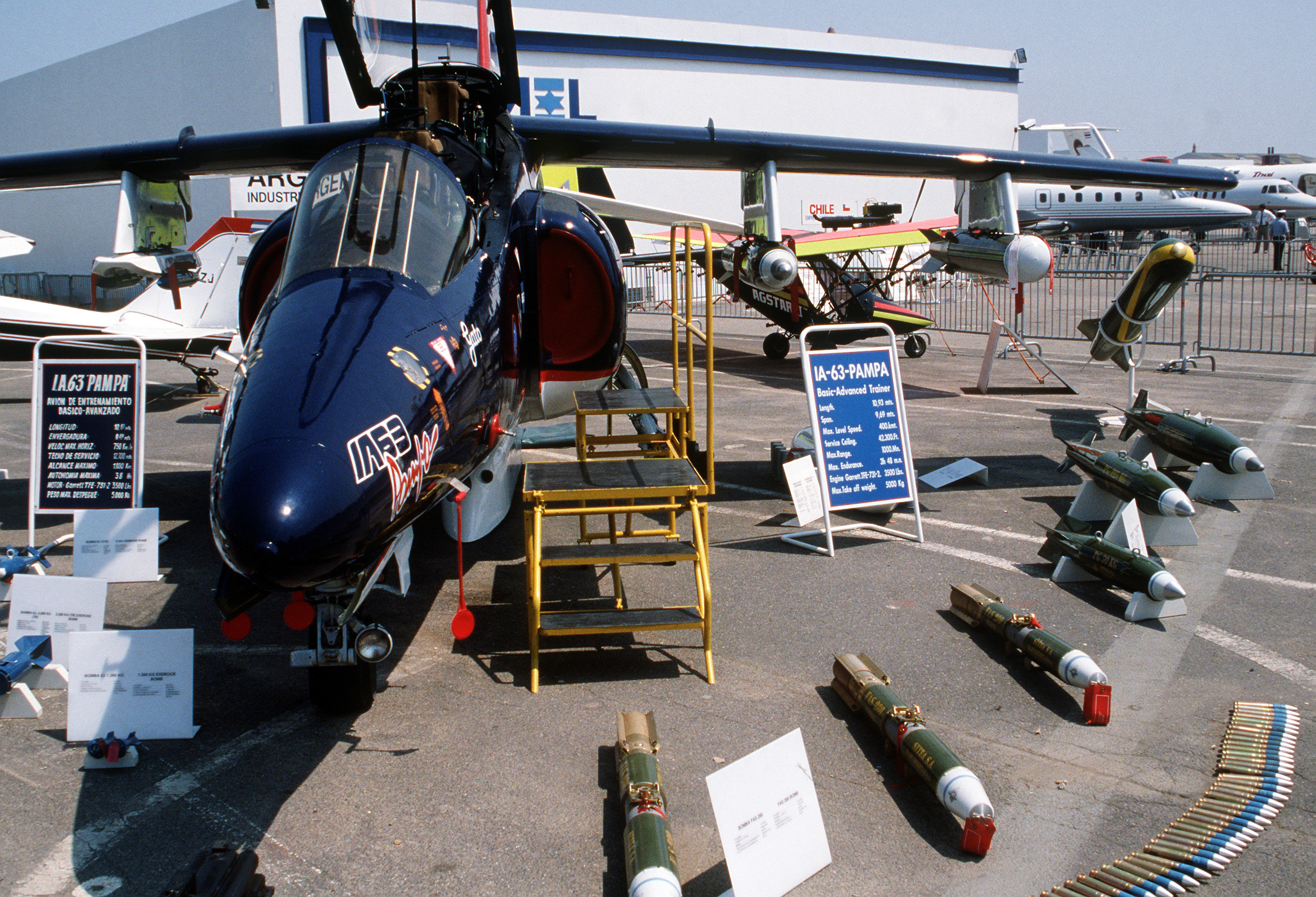
IA-63 armament

Data from Jane's All The World's Aircraft 1988–89 and Air Force Technology

General characteristics

- Crew: 2
- Length: 10.93 m (35 ft 10 in)
- Wingspan: 9.69 m (31 ft 9 in)
- Height: 4.29 m (14 ft 1 in)
- Wing area: 15.63 m^{2} (168.2 sq ft)
- Airfoil: Dornier DoA-7
- Empty weight: 2,821 kg (6,219 lb)
- Gross weight: 3,500 kg (7,716 lb)
- Max takeoff weight: 5,000 kg (11,023 lb)
- Powerplant: 1 × Honeywell TFE731-2-2N turbofan engine, 15.57 kN (3,500 lbf) thrust

Performance

- Maximum speed: 819 km/h (509 mph, 442 kn) at 7,000 m (23,000 ft)
- Cruise speed: 747 km/h (464 mph, 403 kn) at 4,000 m (13,000 ft)
- Never exceed speed: M0.81 at 9,500 m (31,200 ft)
- Range: 1,500 km (930 mi, 810 nmi)
- Service ceiling: 12,900 m (42,300 ft)
- Rate of climb: 30.2 m/s (5,940 ft/min)

Armament

- Guns:
  - 1 × 30 mm (1.18 in) Defa-Giat 554 with 145 rounds of ammo.
  - 4 × 7,62 mm Colibri Pods
- Hardpoints: 5 with a capacity of
  - 400 kg (880 lb) on inboard underwing pylons
  - 250 kg (550 lb) on fuselage centerline and outer wing pylons
- Missiles:
  - LAU-32/51 rocket pods
  - LAU-10 rocket pods
  - ARM-657 Mamboretá pods
- Bombs:
  - Mk81/ Mk82 bombs
  - CBLS 200 practice bombs

== See also ==
Related development

- Dassault/Dornier Alpha Jet

Aircraft of comparable role, configuration, and era

- Aermacchi S-211
- Aero L-39 Albatros
- BAE Hawk
- CASA C-101
- IAR-99
- PZL I-22 Iryda
- Soko G-4 Super Galeb
