= ARM-657 Mamboretá =

- Type: Rocket pod
- Place of origin: Argentina

Service history
- Used by: Argentine Army; Argentine Air Force

Production history
- Designer: Fabricaciones Militares; CITEDEF

Specifications
- Mass: 52 kg (115 lb)
- Diameter: 57 mm (5.7 cm)

The ARM-657 Mamboretá is a rocket pod of Argentine origin, each carrying 6 Áspid 57mm rockets. It is used on the IA 58 Pucará, Embraer 312 Tucano, IA 63 Pampa, A-4AR Fightinghawk and Hughes 500 helicopters of the Argentine Air Force, it was also expected to be used by the UH-1H Huey II and the CH-14 Aguilucho of the Argentine Army. It is a design by Fabricaciones Militares and CITEDEF, and mass-production as well as further improvement of the system has been planned at the former.

The Áspid rocket has a modular warhead section that can be switched for different types of targets expected in close air support and counterinsurgency missions.

It has two variants: A with intervalometer and B without intervalometer.
