= South Yorkshire Aircraft Museum =

Aviation museum in Doncaster, South Yorkshire, England

- Location within South Yorkshire
- Location: Doncaster, South Yorkshire
- Coordinates: 53.5142°N 1.1093°W
- Type: Aviation museum
- Website: www.southyorkshireaircraftmuseum.org.uk

The South Yorkshire Aircraft Museum (SYAM) is a volunteer-led museum located at Lakeside in Doncaster, South Yorkshire, England. It occupies the former site of the Royal Air Force Station, RAF Doncaster. The museum occupies the last remaining original buildings from RAF Doncaster in the shape of a Bellman hangar, two wooden Air Ministry 'Billet Huts' (Buildings 19 and 21) and various smaller structures. The museum has also erected a more modern ex Air Training Corps Cadet Hut alongside Building 21 to house its World War Two Collection.

The museum is also home to the Yorkshire Helicopter Preservation Group (YHPG) which relocated from the Yorkshire Air Museum at Elvington, near York in July 2002. The YHPG display their collection of helicopters among the other SYAM exhibits and have an on-site workshop for continued restoration of their aircraft.

== History ==
The museum received a Pucará from the Royal Air Force Museum in 2025 and a Bristol Bolingbroke project from the Imperial War Museum in 2026.

== Aircraft on display ==
The South Yorkshire Aircraft Museum has a wide range of aircraft on display from the earliest days of aviation, through to modern military fast jets. There is also a large collection of civil aircraft and gliders. The museum is also home to a large permanent display about the Falklands War, with a collection of aircraft on display having been flown during that conflict, or representative of their type. The museum also preserves a large collection of aircraft with links to the local area, many having flown from local airfields such as RAF Finningley, Doncaster Sheffield Airport and Doncaster Airfield (the former RAF Doncaster).

Many of the exhibits have been restored by volunteers, notably the Avro Vulcan B.2 XL388 cockpit section, Bristol Sycamore HR.14 XE317, Gloster Meteor T.7 WA667 and Cessna 150 G-AVAA.

=== Aircraft with local links ===
These aircraft listed below are significant to the aviation history of the Doncaster Area having flown from local airfields.

- BAE Systems Hawk T.1 XX238. Flown from RAF Finningley with No. 6 Flying Training School between 1993 and the closure of the base in 1996.
- Blériot XI Replica. Built in 2009 to commemorate the centenary of the 1909 Doncaster Aviation Meeting, the first to be held in England. The replica depicts the aircraft flown by Léon Delagrange.
- 2003 Cayley Flyer Replica. Built by BAE Systems at Brough and sponsored by Virgin Atlantic, the replica was flown by Sir Richard Branson at Brompton Dale, Scarborough to celebrate the 150th anniversary of the flight of Sir George Cayley's original light in 2003.
- De Havilland Dove G-ARUM/G-DDCD. Used by the National Coal Board as an Executive Transport aircraft and regularly flown into Doncaster Airfield.
- Handley Page Jetstream XX495. Flown from RAF Finningley. The aircraft was donated to the museum by Bedford College in 2018.
- Hawker Siddeley HS.125 Dominie T.1 XS735. Flown from RAF Finningley.
- Piper PA-23 Apache G-APMY. United Steel Transport aircraft, Regularly flown into Scunthorpe Steelworks.
- Vickers Varsity WJ903 (cockpit section). Flown from RAF Finningley.
- Taylorcraft Auster AOP.1 LB314. Flown from RAF Firbeck (The museum's original site) during the Second World War. This aircraft was transported by museum volunteers from Denmark in 2018 and is now on display in Building 21, where it retains its Danish civil registration marks OY-DSZ.
- Grumman American AA-1B G-BCLW. Flown from RAF Finningley by one of the flying schools, G-BCLW was written off in 2013 after the propeller contacted the nose wheel spat during a heavy landing and its insurers assessed the damage as uneconomical to repair. G-BCLW was first based at Doncaster Airfield, the museum's current site.

=== Falklands Collection ===
The aircraft listed below have links to the Falklands War and are on display at the South Yorkshire Aircraft Museum.

- Westland Wessex HU.5 XS481. XS481 was transported to the south Atlantic onboard the Astronomer as an attrition replacement for the Wessexes lost during the sinking of the Atlantic Conveyor. XS481 arrived at the Falkland Islands after the Argentine surrender and saw no action during the war, however it was used in the immediate aftermath .
- Westland Gazelle AH.1 XX411 of 3 Commando Brigade Air Squadron, was shot down on the first day of the British landings by small arms fire off Port San Carlos and Pilot Sergeant Evans was killed. The airframe was recovered on 20 October 1982 and returned to Middle Wallop for potential repair but was assessed as a structural loss.
- Aermacchi MB-339 4-A-116. One of three Argentinian MB-339s captured by British forces during the Falklands War and the only one returned to the UK. Displayed at the Fleet Air Arm Museum for a short period before being used by Rolls-Royce and painted in a white scheme. Recently returned to its original Argentinian markings.
- Bell Huey UH-1H Iroquois AE-406. Flown by the Aviacion de Ejercito Argentino EA (Argentinian Army Aviation) and captured by British forces during the Falklands War.
- Westland Scout AH.1 XV139. Flown during the Falklands War by 656 Squadron AAC, XV139 was operating at Port Harriet House on 9 June 1982 when Argentine troops launched a Blowpipe missile, which missed it by less than 25 yards.
- Westland Sea King HAS.6 XV677. Transported to the Falkland Islands on board Queen Elizabeth 2 (XV677 was the second helicopter to land on deck after modifications were completed). Arrived at Port San Carlos on 2 June 1982. XV677 flew in the Falklands with 825 Naval Air Squadron as a Sea King HAS.2. Subsequent modifications and upgrades after the War brought the aircraft up to the HAS.6 standard. XV677 was also the first Sea King helicopter to enter preservation in the UK when it arrived at the South Yorkshire Aircraft Museum in July 2006.
- FMA IA-58 Pucara A-533. Arriving at Goose Green on 15 May 1982 as a replacement for the Pucará's lost during the SAS Raid on Pebble Island, A-533 was captured by British forces at Stanley Racecourse at the end of the war. Returned to the UK for evaluation and given the UK Military serial number of ZD486. The aircraft was scrapped in the 1990's, with the cockpit section being preserved for display. A-533 arrived at the South Yorkshire Aircraft Museum for display in September 2024.
- FMA IA-58 Pucara A-515.

== See also ==
- List of aerospace museums
