= ST Aerospace A-4SU Super Skyhawk =

Singaporean upgrade of A-4 Skyhawk

A-4SU Super Skyhawk
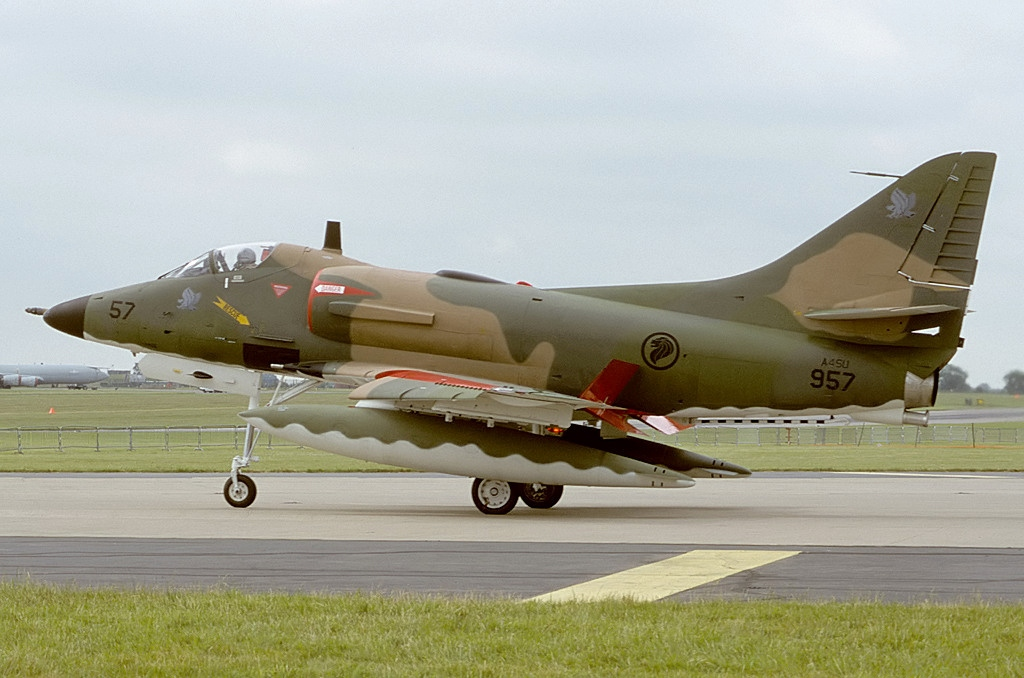
- A 150 Sqn A-4SU (957) at RAF Waddington during the Waddington International Airshow, 2000

General information
- Type: Fighter-bomber, Advanced jet trainer
- Manufacturer: Douglas Aircraft Company; Lockheed Aircraft Services; Singapore Aircraft Industries (SAI, now ST Aerospace)
- Status: Retired
- Primary user: Republic of Singapore Air Force
- Number built: ~150

History
- Introduction date: 1989
- First flight: 19 September 1986
- Retired: 2012
- Developed from: Douglas A-4 Skyhawk

The ST Aerospace A-4SU Super Skyhawk is a major upgrade project of the Douglas A-4S Skyhawk attack aircraft undertaken by Singapore Aircraft Industries (SAI, now ST Aerospace) in the 1980s. It was used exclusively by the Republic of Singapore Air Force (RSAF), serving in the fighter-bomber role from 1989 until retirement from front line service in 2005. Since mid-1999, the A-4SU took on the additional role of being the designated advanced jet trainer (AJT) aircraft for the RSAF's AJT training program/detachment in Cazaux, France.

== Design and development ==
=== A-4S and TA-4S ===
Starting in 1973, the RSAF began to acquire Douglas A-4 Skyhawks. The first batch of over 50 airframes (ex-US Navy A-4Bs) was requisitioned from the Military Aircraft Storage and Disposition Center at Davis–Monthan AFB, Arizona which was released to the Lockheed Aircraft Service Company at Ontario, California, and its subsidiary Lockheed Aircraft Service Singapore at Seletar Airfield, Singapore for a major overhaul and refurbishment.

These aircraft emerged as the A-4S single-seater (44 airframes) and the TA-4S two-seat trainer (three airframes), all having more than 100 changes incorporated (these included a longer nose to house a new avionics package, five stores hardpoints instead of the usual three, a saddle-style Automatic Direction Finder dorsal hump, cockpit armour plating, spoilers, a cranked refuelling probe, AIM-9 Sidewinder capability, a brake parachute housing below the jetpipe into the standard A-4B airframes. As with the Israeli A-4Hs which were armed with a pair of 30 mm DEFA cannons, these were similarly armed with the 30 mm (1.18 in) ADEN cannons in place of the original 20 mm Colt Mk 12 cannons. A later order of four two-seat trainer airframes was placed in 1976, and these joined the RSAF in 1977.

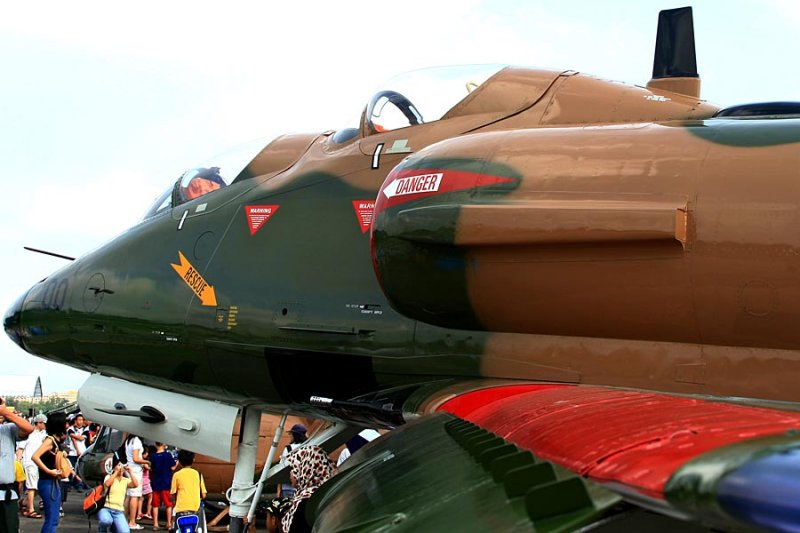
Stepped cockpit layout of a TA-4SU (900). The row of vortex generators on the drooped leading edge slats and the ram-air intake mounted on the portside for engine cooling, are unique to the TA-4SU.

The TA-4S trainers were not the standard TA-4 with a common cockpit for the student and instructor pilot, but were instead rebuilt by Lockheed with a 28-inch (710 mm) fuselage plug inserted into the front fuselage and a separate bulged cockpit (giving better all round visibility) for the instructor seated behind the student pilot. This arrangement was unique for the RSAF but was not the first by Lockheed (the Lockheed SR-71B and U-2CT/U-2RT/TR-1B/TU-2S trainers also used stepped cockpits). These rebuilt TA-4S trainers were powered by the original Wright J65 turbojet engines as used in the B/C models instead of the Pratt & Whitney J52 that powered purpose-built TA-4E/Fs trainers from Douglas; this was the main reason why the RSAF decided to not procure the TA-4E/Fs and then having to maintain two different engines across the fleet.

All single-seat aircraft were retired when the upgraded A-4SU entered service, instead, the twin-seaters were upgraded and remained in service.

=== A-4S-1 and TA-4S-1 ===
A second batch of 70 airframes was ordered (mix of ex-US Navy A-4Bs and A-4Cs) in 1980, these were shipped directly to Singapore for rebuilding with the A-4Cs being rebuilt as the A-4S-1s while the A-4Bs remained in storage for use as spares. Along with a small number of TA-4S-1s, these newer Skyhawks (characterised by its straight refuelling probe instead of the cranked refuelling probe found on the original A-4S/TA-4S) would join the RSAF as attrition replacements from 1982. However, these airframes retained the original 20 mm (0.787 in) Colt Mk 12 cannons of the A-4Cs.

In 1983, a third order of 8 TA-4S saw 16 stored A-4Bs from the Aerospace Maintenance and Regeneration Center being converted and rebuilt as the TA-4S-1 trainers (eight airframes).

=== A-4SU and TA-4SU Super Skyhawk ===
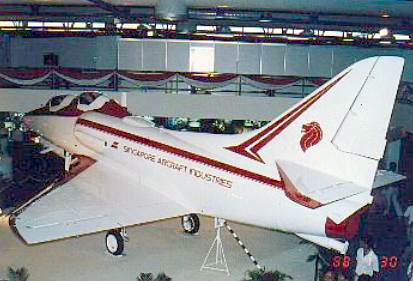
A full scale TA-4SU mock-up on display at the stand of Singapore Aircraft Industries at the 1988 Asian Aerospace exhibition

In 1985, as a result of four A-4S being written off in separate accidents, coupled with the low serviceability of the original batch of A-4S, investigations conducted by RSAF revealed that although much of the fuselage's life remained, the Wright J65 engines used were too old and the associated spare parts were becoming both difficult and expensive to obtain. Consequently, the RSAF decided to upgrade the A-4S/TA-4S rather than to replace them.

SAI served as the main contractor for the upgrade project and a non-afterburning General Electric F404-GE-100D turbofan engine selected to power it, the scheme was extended to cover the entire fleet of newer A-4S-1s. The work involved a complete avionics modernisation, which included a nose-mounted Pave Penny laser seeker, an Inertial navigation system (INS), a Tactical air navigation system (TACAN), fore & aft Radar warning receivers (RWR) and chaff/flare countermeasures. The modernized A-4SU and TA-4SU versions had 29% more thrust, which resulted in a 30% reduction in takeoff time as well as an increase in usable payload, range and maximum speed. The maximum speed now at sea level is 610 knots (1,130 km/h; 700 mph), and maximum cruise speed at 30,000 feet (9,100 m) was 446 knots (826 km/h; 513 mph).

== Operational history ==
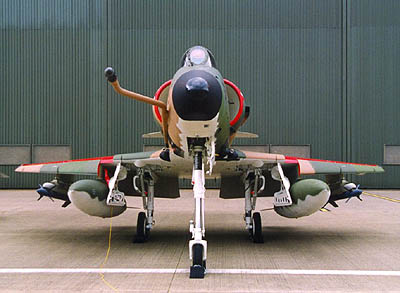
Head on profile of an A-4SU, note the cranked refuelling probe, the drooped leading edge slats as well as the ram-air intake. Also, inert AIM-9 Sidewinders painted in blue are carried on the outboard pylons.

By 1974, the RSAF received enough refurbished A-4S to form the No. 142 Gryphon Squadron and No. 143 Phoenix Sqn, which were based at Tengah Air Base and Changi Air Base, respectively. In RSAF service, the A-4S/TA-4S were given 3-digit serials starting with 6 (e.g. 600, 651). From 1982, A-4S-1 and TA-4S-1 Skyhawks were also obtained as attrition replacements; in 1984, the balance was allocated to form a new unit - No. 145 Hornet Squadron which was also based at Tengah Air Base. These were given 3-digit serial starting with 9 (e.g. 900, 929). In total, 150 airframes (all A-4Bs and Cs) were acquired by Singapore.

The modernized A-4SU Super Skyhawks were first received by 143 Squadron, followed by 142 and 145 Squadron of the RSAF from 1989 onwards. The type was also operated by the RSAF Black Knights aerobatic display team for precision aerial manoeuvers from 1990 to 2000.

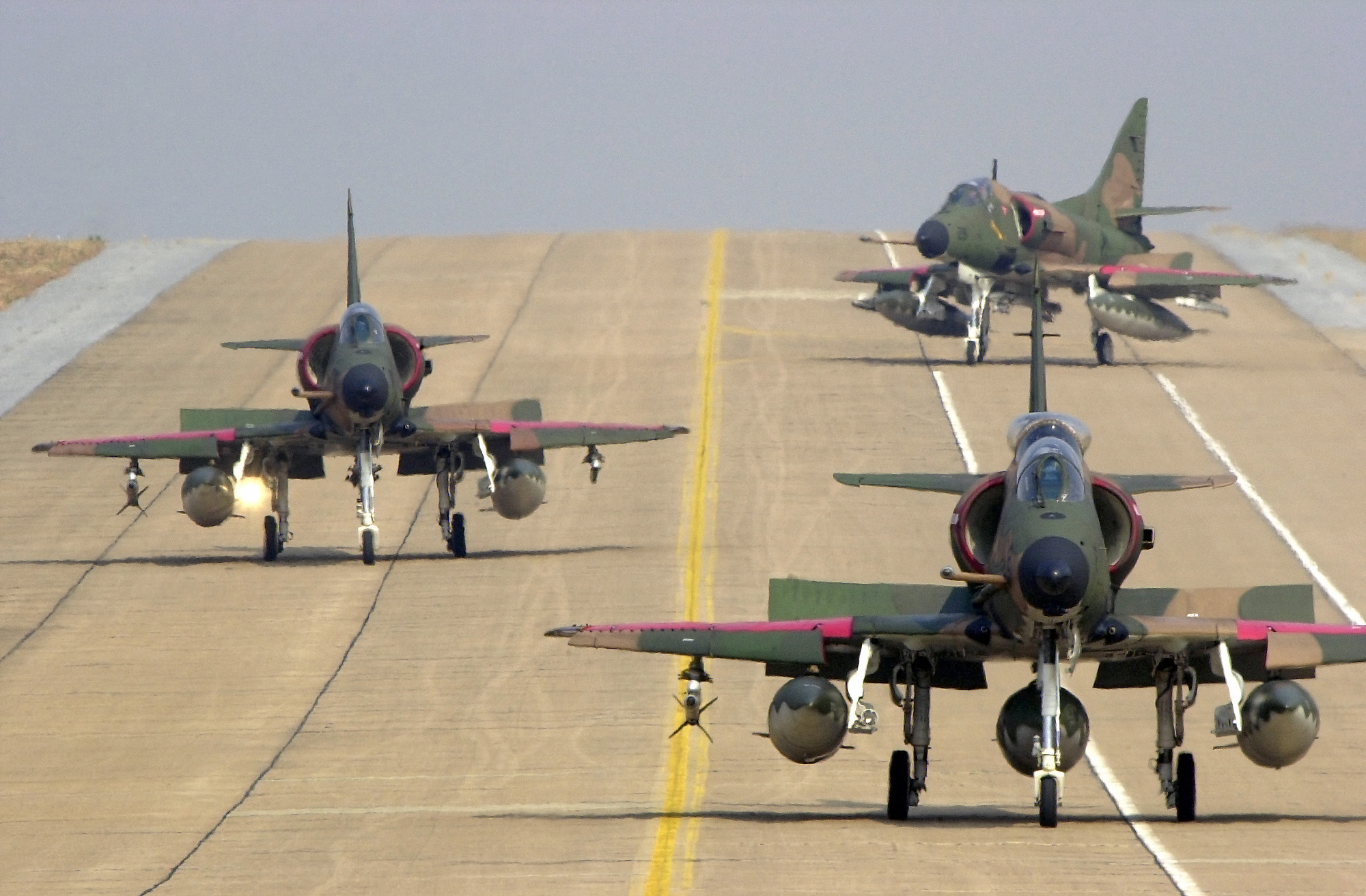
One TA-4SU leading two A-4SUs on the flight line at Korat AB, Thailand, during Exercise Cope Tiger '02.

In 1998, the French government offered the use of facilities at Cazaux Air Base. A 25-year lease for basing rights of 18 A-4SUs and approximately 250 RSAF personnel and their families was signed later that year. The Singapore-based 143 Squadron was disbanded in 1997 and its aircraft were handed over to 150 Squadron in place of its SIAI-Marchetti SF.260 basic trainers. 150 Squadron took up the role of advanced jet training, using its A-4SUs as a lead-in fighter trainer for RSAF pilots in France; the first of 18 aircraft were sent to France by ship in mid-1999 as part of the RSAF's Advanced Jet Training Program. The 11 remaining training aircraft (4 A-4SUs and 7 TA-4SUs) were originally scheduled to retire in 2007, but remained in service until the delivery of their replacement, the Alenia Aermacchi M-346 Master, which was scheduled for 2012.

After 31 years of operations, the RSAF officially withdrew its A-4SU fleet from front line duties on 31 March 2005. Major feats included a direct flight from Singapore to the Philippines (involving the RSAF's first air-to-air refuelling mission) in 1986, as well as the aerobatic displays of the 'red and white' A-4SUs flown by the RSAF's Black Knights during Asian Aerospace 1990, 1994 and 2000, it was last used by the Black Knights during Singapore's National Day Parade held on 9 August 2000. A month before its retirement, the Skyhawk squadron (145 Squadron) won the top honours in a strike exercise against its more modern F-16 and F-5 counterparts and emerged as the Top combat squadron in the Singapore Armed Forces Best Unit Competition, an honour it has held since year 2000.

On 5 October 2005, one A-4SU was delivered to Singapore Polytechnic as a teaching aid. Subsequently, Ngee Ann Polytechnic, Temasek Polytechnic and Nanyang Technological University each received an A-4SU as well. Two A-4SUs were donated to the French Air and Space Museum (Musée de l'Air) for static display; only 928 has been on display in the museum's Rosette Hall as 941 was stored.

== Variants ==
A-4SU Super Skyhawk
Upgraded from A-4S-1.
TA-4SU Super Skyhawk
Upgraded from TA-4S and TA-4S-1 trainer.

== Operators ==
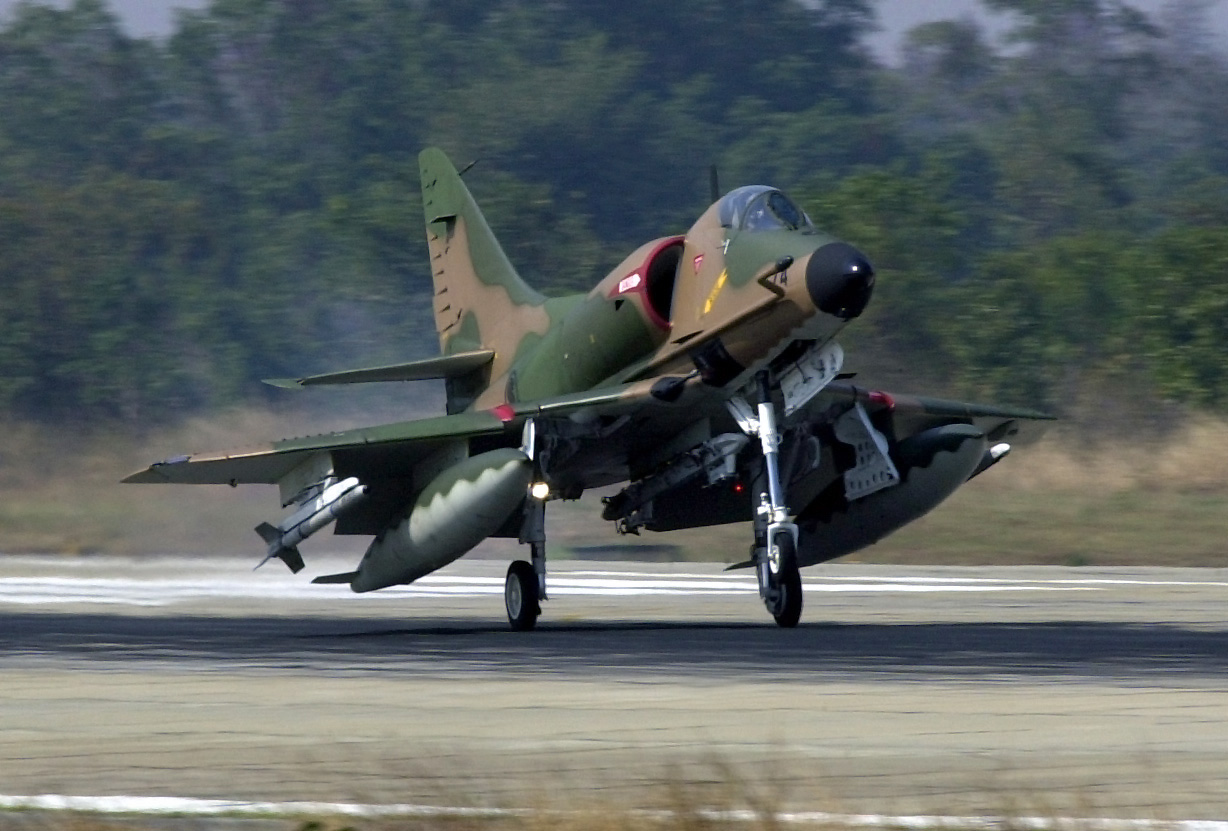
An A-4SU (974) belonging to 142 Sqn taking off from RTAFB Korat during Exercise COPE TIGER '02.

Singapore

- Republic of Singapore Air Force
  - 142 Squadron: last operational RSAF squadron to operate the Super Skyhawks, disbanded on 1 April 2005 but was subsequently reformed in 2015 to operate the F-15SG.
  - 143 Squadron: disbanded in 1997 after handing over its remaining aircraft to 150 Sqn, subsequently reformed in 2003 to operate the F-16C/Ds.
  - 145 Squadron: converted to F-16D+ in 2004.
  - 150 Squadron: converted to M-346 in 2012.
  - The RSAF Black Knights aerobatic team operated the A-4SU from 1990 to 2000, they switched to an all F-16C six-ship formation for their performance during the 2008 Singapore Airshow.

== Aircraft on display ==
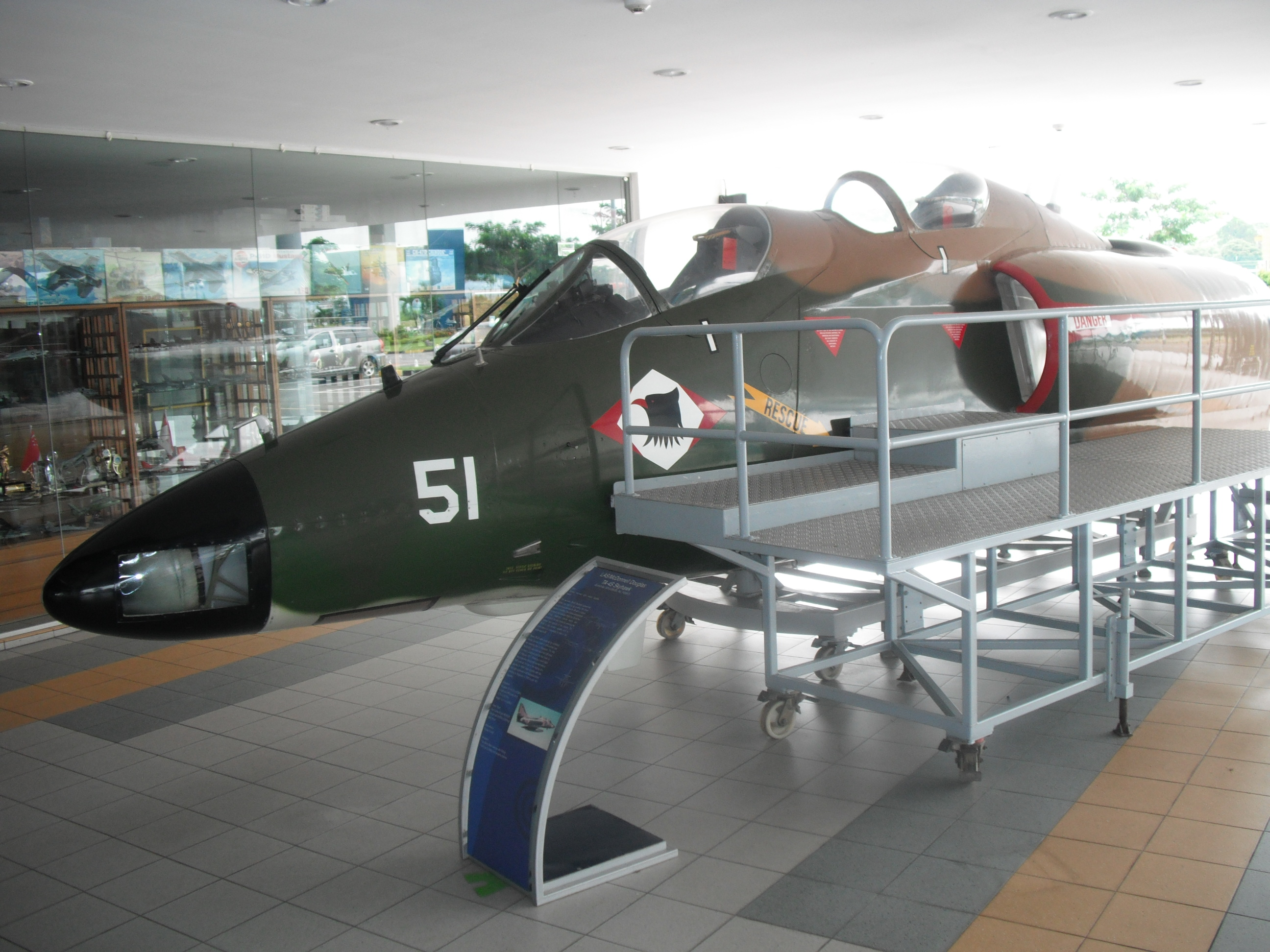
Static display fuselage of TA-4S (651) BuNo 145047

- A-4S (600) BuNo 142850, static display at Singapore Discovery Centre.
- A-4S (690) BuNo 144979, static display at SAFTI Military Institute.
- A-4S (607) BuNo 145013, static display at Singapore Air Force Museum.
- TA-4S (651) BuNo 145047 (forward fuselage section and cockpit), static display at Singapore Air Force Museum.
- A-4SU (928) BuNo 147797, static display at the French Aerospace Museum in Paris, while another A-4SU (941) BuNo 145071, was stored.
- A-4SU (929) BuNo 145073, gate guardian at Singapore Air Force Museum.
- TA-4SU (900) BuNo 147742, static display at Singapore Air Force Museum.

== Specifications (A-4SU) ==
A-4SU patch as worn by qualified RSAF pilots.

Data from International Directory of Military Aircraft, Skyhawk.Org

General characteristics

- Crew: 1 (2 in TA-4SU, student and instructor)
- Length: 12.72 m (41 ft 9 in)
- Wingspan: 8.38 m (27 ft 6 in)
- Height: 4.57 m (15 ft 0 in)
- Wing area: 24.1 m^{2} (259.8 sq ft)
- Empty weight: 4,650 kg (10,250 lb)
- Max takeoff weight: 10,205 kg (22,500 lb)
- Powerplant: 1 × General Electric F404-GE-100D turbofan, 48.4 kN (10,800 lbf) thrust

Performance

- Maximum speed: 1,128 km/h (701 mph, 609 kn)
- Ferry range: 3,220 km (2,000 mi, 1,700 nmi) with 3 drop tanks
- Service ceiling: 12,192 m (40,000 ft)
- Rate of climb: 55 m/s (10,913 ft/min)
- Wing loading: 344.4 kg/m^{2} (70.7 lb/sq ft)
- Thrust/weight: 0.55

Armament

- Guns: 2× 30 mm ADEN cannons, 200 rounds/gun
- Hardpoints: 5 total: 1× centreline/under-fuselage plus 4× underwing pylon stations with a capacity of 9,900 pounds (4,500 kg), with provisions to carry combinations of:
  - Rockets: LAU-5003 rocket pods (19× 70 mm CRV7 rockets) or LAU-10 rocket pods (4× 127 mm Zuni rockets) or Matra rocket pods (18× 68 mm SNEB rockets)
  - Missiles: AIM-9 Sidewinder Air-to-air missile or AGM-65 Maverick Air-to-surface missile
  - Bombs: Paveway series of Laser-guided bombs (LGB); or Mark 80 series unguided bombs (including 3 kg and 14 kg practice bombs)
  - Other: up to 3× 370 US gallons (1,400 L; 310 imp gal) external drop tanks (only pylon stations 2, 3, 4 are wet-plumbed)

Avionics

- Stewart-Warner AN/APQ-145 Mapping & Ranging radar
- GEC/Ferranti 4510 Head-up display/weapons delivery system
- Litton LN-93 Inertial navigation system
- BAE Systems MED-2067 Multi-function displays
- Lockheed Martin AN/AAS-35V Pave Penny laser tracker for use with Paveway LGBs

== See also ==
Related development

- Douglas A-4 Skyhawk
- Lockheed Martin A-4AR Fightinghawk
- Project Kahu

Aircraft of comparable role, configuration, and era

- LTV A-7 Corsair II
- McDonnell Douglas AV-8B Harrier II
