= Lockheed Martin A-4AR Fightinghawk =

Upgraded version of Douglas A4m Skyhawk developed for Argentine airforce

A-4AR Fightinghawk
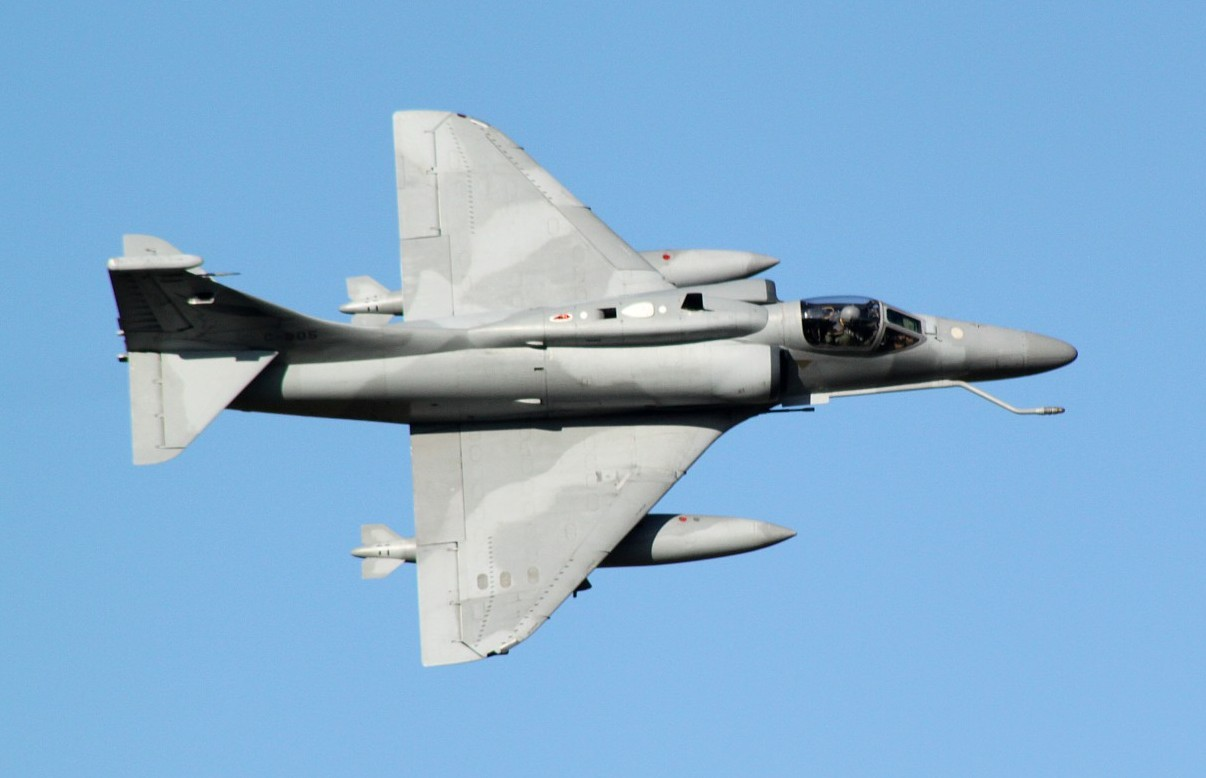
- An A-4AR during Air Fest 2010

General information
- Type: Ground attack fighter
- Manufacturer: Lockheed Martin Aircraft Argentina SA
- Status: Retired
- Primary user: Argentine Air Force (historical)
- Number built: 36 converted

History
- Manufactured: 1996–1999
- Introduction date: December 1997
- First flight: December 1997
- Retired: 15 May 2026
- Developed from: A-4M Skyhawk

The Lockheed Martin A-4AR Fightinghawk is a major upgrade of the McDonnell Douglas A-4M Skyhawk attack aircraft developed for the Argentine Air Force which entered service in 1998. The program was named Fightinghawk in recognition of the F-16 Fighting Falcon, which was the source of its new avionics.

== Design and development ==
=== Background ===
The supply of combat aircraft to Argentina was restricted by the imposing of arms embargoes, such as by the United States in 1978 in response to human rights abuses via the Kennedy Amendment to the Foreign Assistance Act; as well as by the United Kingdom after the outbreak of the Falklands War in 1982. The only combat aircraft that the Argentine Air Force, which lost over 60 aircraft during the conflict, could obtain were 10 Mirage 5Ps transferred from the Peruvian Air Force, 19 Six-Day War veteran Mirage IIICJs from Israel, and 2 Mirage IIIB trainers from the French Air Force.

In 1989, Carlos Menem was elected President of Argentina and quickly established a pro-United States foreign policy, which led to the country gaining Major non-NATO ally status. During 1994, a counteroffer from the United States to modernize 36 former US Marine Corps A-4M Skyhawk II under a US$282 million deal that would be performed by Lockheed Martin and included the privatization of the Fabrica Militar de Aviones (Military Aircraft Factory – FMA), which was renamed Lockheed Martin Aircraft Argentina SA (LMAASA) afterward. In 2010, LMAASA reverted to the Argentine government as Fabrica Argentina de Aviones (FADEA).

=== Production ===
Argentine Air Force technicians chose 32 A-4M (built between 1970/1976) and 4 TA-4F airframes from the Aerospace Maintenance and Regeneration Center at Davis-Monthan Air Force Base in Tucson, Arizona to upgrade. The upgrade plans included:

- Complete overhaul of the airframe, wiring looms and the Pratt & Whitney J52P-408A engine
- Installation of Douglas Escapac 1-G3 ejection seats
- HGU-55/P helmets
- Honeywell Normal Air-Garrett's OBOGS (On Board Oxygen Generation System)
- Westinghouse/Northrop Grumman AN/APG-66V2 (ARG-1) radar
- HOTAS controls and a 'glass' cockpit (2 CRT color screens)
- Sextant Avionique/Thales Avionics SHUD
- Litton/Northrop Grumman LN-100G inertial navigation system
- MIL-STD-1553B data bus
- Two General Dynamics Information Systems AN/AYK-14 mission computers
- Northrop Grumman AN/ALR-93 (V)1 Radar warning receiver
- AN/ALQ-126B jammer
- AN/ALQ-162 jammer
- ALR-47 chaff/flare dispenser
- AN/APX-72 IFF

The contract stipulated that eight airframes would be refurbished at Lockheed Martin's plant in Palmdale, California and the rest (27) in Córdoba, Argentina at LMAASA. At least ten TA-4J and A-4M airframes for use as spare parts, eight additional engines, and a new A-4AR simulator were also delivered.

== Operational history ==
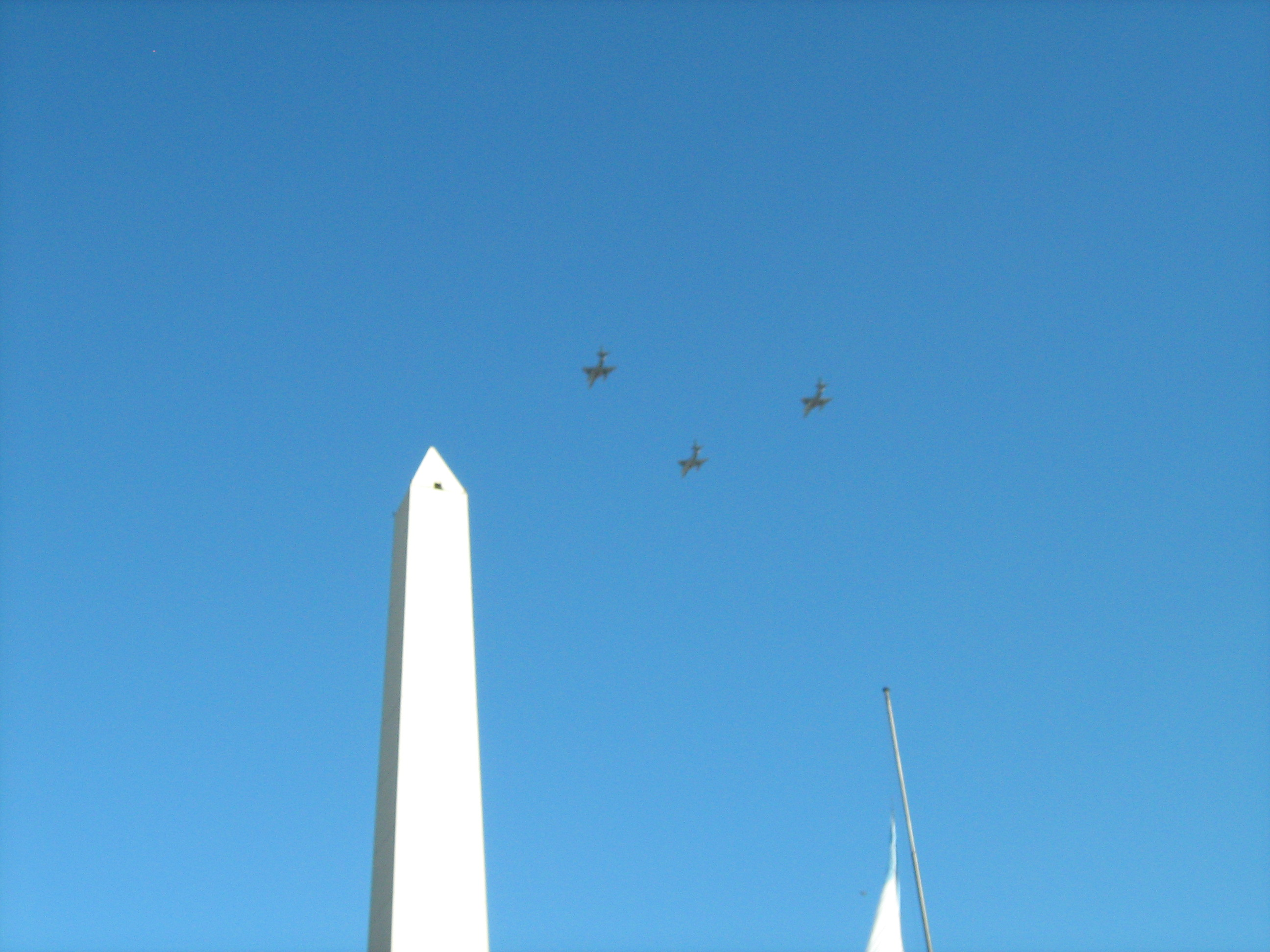
Overflying the Obelisk of Buenos Aires during the Argentina Bicentennial

The Fightinghawks, having received Air Force serials C-901 to C-936, saw their first group arrive in Argentina on 18 December 1997; the first Argentine A-4AR was rolled out on 3 August 1998 at Cordoba. The last one, number 936, was delivered in March 2000. Two aircraft (a one-seat and a two-seat) remained for a time in the United States for weapons homologation. All A-4ARs were delivered to the 5th Air Brigade (V Brigada Aérea) at Villa Reynolds, San Luis Province, where they replaced two squadrons of aged A-4P (locally known as A-4B) and A-4C. They were soon deployed in rotation around the country from Rio Gallegos in the south to Resistencia in the north where they were used to intercept smugglers and drug trafficking airplanes.

In November 2005, they were deployed to Tandil airbase to enforce a no-fly zone for the Mar del Plata Summit of the Americas. In July 2006, they were deployed to Cordoba province for the Mercosur's 30th Presidents Summit.

Fly by over the Del Libertador avenue in Buenos Aires, May 2017

In August 2009, they were deployed to Bariloche for the UNASUR Presidents summit. Later that month, they participated at Reconquista, Santa Fe of the Pre-Salitre^{official video} an exercise of preparation for the Salitre II^{official video} of next October in Chile with Chile, Brazil, France and the United States.

On 1 May 2010, they participated in the Air Fest 2010 show at Morón Airport and Air Base.^{video} On 25 May 2010, three A-4ARs flew over the 9 de Julio Avenue at Buenos Aires as part of the Argentina Bicentennial shows.

In August 2010, the aircraft enforced a no-fly zone at San Juan for the Mercosur's Presidents Summit. One month later, they were present at Reconquista, Santa Fe for the ICARO III integration manoeuvers.

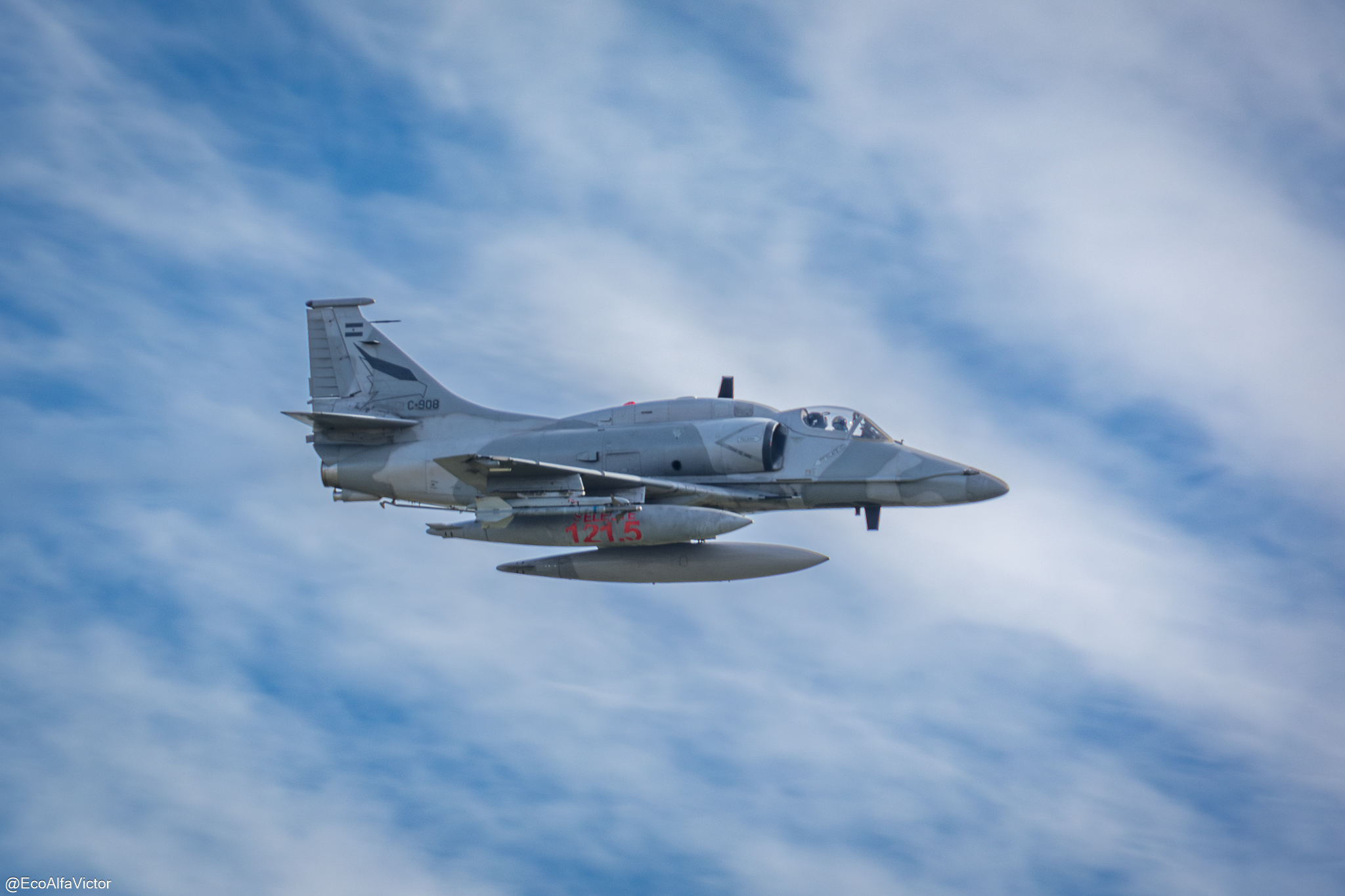
Argentine Air Force A-4AR Fightinghawk

In January 2016, Argentine Minister of Defence Julio Martinez confirmed that all A-4ARs had been grounded. This was originally due to the expiry of the explosive cartridges in their ejection seats, but additional problems became apparent later on. Only 4-5 were found airworthy with the rest were in storage at Villa Reynolds.

In May 2017, several A-4ARs participated in celebrations marking the 2017 anniversary of the May Revolution.

By 2020, as few as six of the aircraft were still reported as operational. In March 2024, Argentina signed a letter of intent with Denmark to acquire 24 used F-16 fighter aircraft as likely replacements for its Fightinghawks.

On 14 May 2026, the A-4AR was officially retired from service and replaced by ex-Danish F-16Ms, due to high maintenance costs and difficulties keeping airframes operational.

== Variants ==
A-4AR
32 converted from A-4Ms
OA-4AR
4 converted from TA-4Fs

== Operators ==
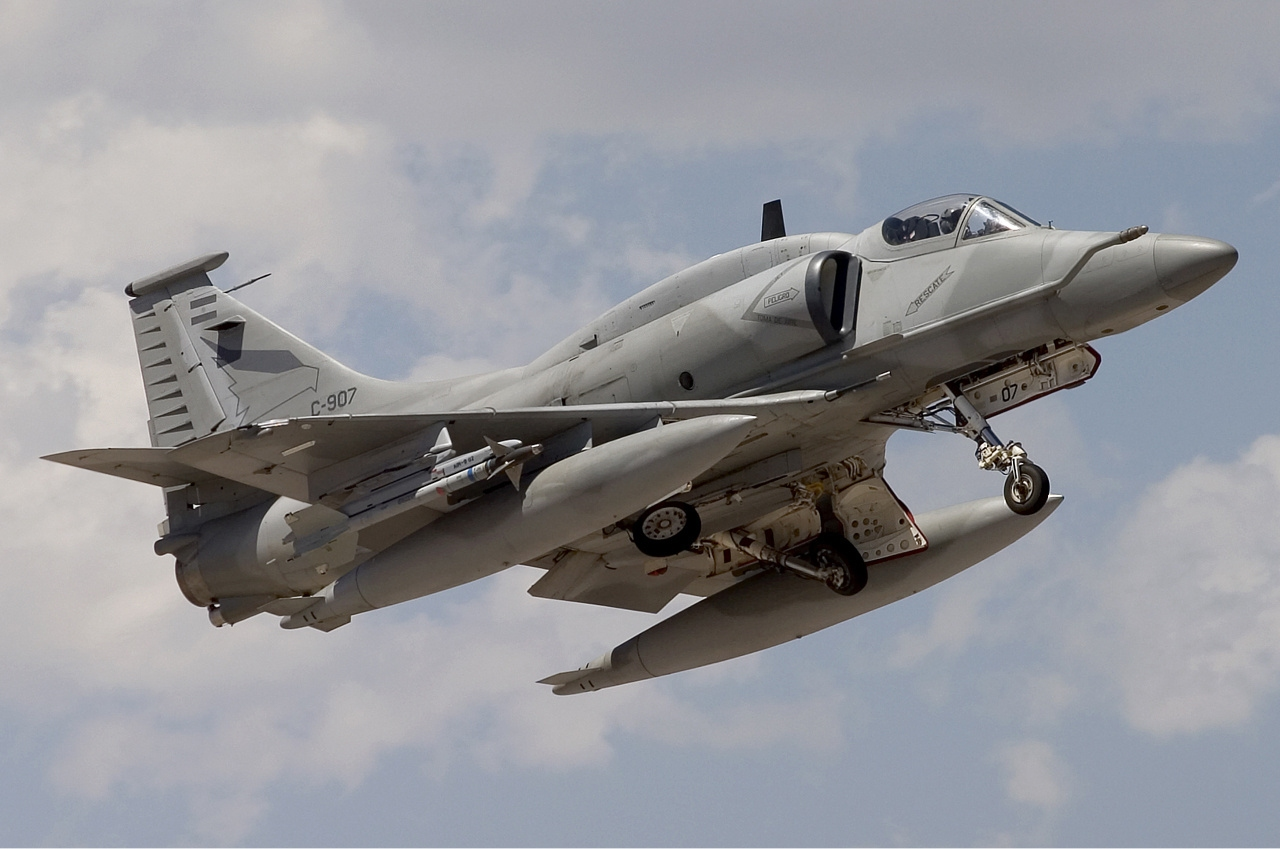
Argentina Air Force A-4AR Fightinghawk.

Argentina

- Argentine Air Force – 36 (32 A-4AR, 4 OA-4AR)

== Specifications (A-4AR Fightinghawk) ==
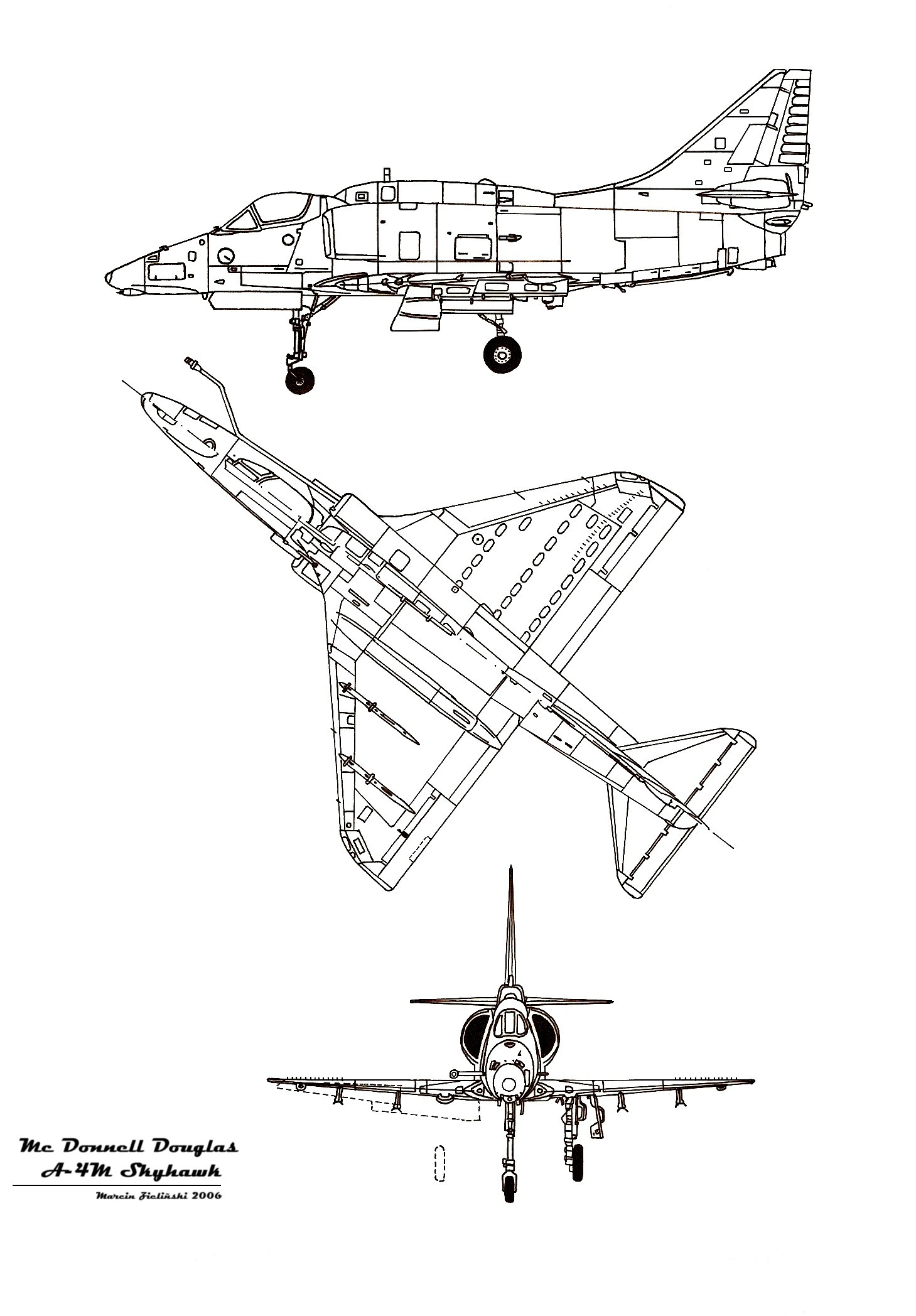
Orthographically projected diagram of the A-4 Skyhawk.

Data from FAA Official site and A-4 Skyhawk

General characteristics

- Crew: 1 (2 in OA-4AR)
- Length: 12.30 m (40 ft 3 in)
- Wingspan: 8.38 m (27 ft 6 in)
- Height: 4.57 m (14 ft 11 in)
- Wing area: 24.15 m^{2} (259 sq ft)
- Empty weight: 4,900 kg (10,803 lb)
- Gross weight: 11,000 kg (24,251 lb)
- Max takeoff weight: 11,136 kg (24,500 lb)
- Powerplant: 1 × Pratt & Whitney J52-P-408A turbojet, 50.0 kN (11,200 lbf) thrust

Performance

- Maximum speed: 1,080 km/h (671 mph, 583 kn)
- Range: 3,220 km (2,000 mi, 1,700 nmi)
- Service ceiling: 12,880 m (42,250 ft)
- Rate of climb: 43 m/s (8,440 ft/min)
- Wing loading: 344.4 kg/m^{2} (70.7 lb/sq ft)
- Thrust/weight: 0.51

Armament

- Guns: 2× 20 mm (0.787 in) Colt Mk 12 cannon, 100 rounds/gun
- Missiles:
  - Air-to-air missiles:
    - 4× AIM-9 Sidewinder
  - Air-to-surface missiles:
    - 4× ARM-657 Mamboretá
- Bombs: 9,900 lb (4,490 kg) on five external hardpoints

== See also ==
Related development

- A-4 Skyhawk
- A-4SU Super Skyhawk
- Project Kahu

Aircraft of comparable role, configuration, and era

- A-7 Corsair II
- AV-8B Harrier II
- Sea Harrier
- Mirage F1

Related lists

- List of attack aircraft
- List of military aircraft of the United States
