= PBS Satellite Service =

Satellite feeds of national PBS programming

- Country: United States
- Broadcast area: Nationwide
- Affiliates: PBS
- Headquarters: Arlington, Virginia, U.S.

Ownership
- Owner: PBS

History
- Founded: 1976; 50 years ago
- Launched: March 1, 1978; 48 years ago
- Former names: PBS National Program Service (1978–present); PBS Schedule X (February 5, 1994-February 9, 2009)

Links
- Website: pbs.org

The PBS Satellite Service (also known as the PBS National Program Service, with the primary C-band feed being formerly known as PBS Schedule X in Eastern Time, with the West Coast delay signal designated PBS-XP) consists of feeds relayed from PBS by satellite to public television stations throughout the United States. The service launched on March 1, 1978, with wider adoption beginning in September 1978 as more satellite downlinks were installed at each PBS stations. The service provides a mixed variety of programming selected from PBS's regular network services. In the X/XP years a satellite feed was multicast by some PBS member stations on an over-the-air DTV subchannel along with their regular programming, or during overnight hours on their main channel to provide a second opportunity for viewers to watch or record primetime programming.

PBS currently utilizes one transponder on the Galaxy 16 satellite, transponder 22. This is a MCPC (multiple channel per carrier) which currently has seven channels uplinked from the PBS NOC (Network Operations Center) in Alexandria, Virginia. However, in the event of approaching weather or technical difficulties at the NOC in Virginia, PBS will switch to a backup uplink location in Lincoln, Nebraska.

Currently, select stations broadcast the feed, usually overnight, like KGTF (PBS Guam, broadcasts most of the channel as a localised feed). The primary feed, known as HD01, is also available over satellite providers like DirecTV (Channel 389), though this feed is down-converted to SD. PBS provides all of their channels free to TV providers who do not receive local member stations.

As of 2026, PBS's satellite feeds, as well as a few other PBS stations, can be received unscrambled using a free-to-air satellite receiver set to these coordinates:

- PBS National Program Service at 99°W (on the Galaxy 16 satellite), K_{u}-band, unencrypted.
- Montana PBS at 99°W (on the Galaxy 16 satellite), K_{u}-band, unencrypted.
- LPB (along with LPB Kids and LPB 3) at 101ºW on the SES-1 satellite, K_{u}-band, unencrypted.

PBS affiliate KETA, part of the Oklahoma Educational Television Authority (OETA), was also available on AMC-21 until June 2016. Their removal from satellite coincided with the completion of their transition to fiber distribution. In March 2026, LPB begain simulasting on the SES-1 satellite. Later in the month, LPB shut down their transponder on SES-2 at 87ºW (where the station has been uplinking to since 2003 when it was originally known as AMC-3) competing the transition to SES-1.

PBS transitioned to a fiber-based interconnection system known as sIX, otherwise known as the sixth generation of PBS's interconnection system, in July 2021. The original end date for linear program feeds via satellite was slated for 2016, but was later pushed to 2018, and was then pushed again to the beginning of 2021; none of these deadlines were met. PBS's main network feeds are still active as of March 2026; however, only one NPS soft-feed service remains, namely HD03. The only programs airing on this feed are news and public affairs programming; all other linear program feeds have moved to sIX; however, there may occasionally be an unannounced feed of program unrelated to news or public affairs, such as re-feeds of certain live events, such as certain episodes of Great Performances.

== History ==
=== 1971–1978: The First-Generation Interconnection System ===
Starting in 1971, PBS began distributing programs via microwave relay circuits leased from AT&T Long Lines. This was the first generation of PBS's interconnection system. Prior to this, PBS would distribute programs to stations via "bicycling tapes," meaning that tapes would be shipped between stations through the mail. The interconnection system consisted of nearly 20,000 miles of microwave paths spread across the country. To send programming, PBS would feed these videotaped programs via the AT&T network of microwave relay circuits throughout the country. Instead of each program being received by each individual public television station, these programs were fed to "regional networks," which would then redirect these feeds to stations within their network. Examples of these regional networks included the Southern Educational Communications Association (SECA), which is now known as the National Educational Telecommunications Association (NETA); the Central Educational Network (CEN); the Eastern Educational Television Network (EEN), which is now known as American Public Television (APT); and Midwestern Educational Television (MET). This system made use of a "round-robin" method when distributing programming; this meant that, "a number of stations on the loop can originate to all other stations in the system."

==== Issues with the System ====
The system, however, had its limits. One problem was that video and audio quality would become poorer the farther away a receiving station was due to the distance the program had to travel via the interconnection system. Furthermore, for areas outside the contiguous U.S., such as Hawaii, connecting to the interconnection system was not "economically feasible"; to acquire programming, these stations were sent videotapes via the mail. Another issue was that this system was single channel only, meaning that PBS could not feed multiple programs at the same time, giving stations less programming options. There were also issues with making last minute changes to programming if PBS needed to pre-empt a previously scheduled program. Lastly, according to PBS, the use of telephone lines to deliver programming was "incapable of producing high-fidelity sound," especially for musical programs such as concerts, so they started to look for an alternate method of distributing programming.

PBS began to inquire about the use of satellite for program distribution dating back to 1971. PBS quickly discovered the benefits satellite distribution would have on their operations. A satellite-based interconnection system would allow improved video and audio quality. Unlike the terrestrial-based system, where quality degrades the farther the signal travels, programs fed via satellite would suffer no loss in quality; each station would receive the same copy of the program. A satellite-based system would also allow for more than one program feed.

==== Digital Audio for Television (DATE) ====
In 1973, PBS, along with Digital Communication Corp, developed a prototype audio system that would allow for high-quality audio to be transmitted alongside television programming. This system consisted of four 15-kHz audio channels that would be "multiplexed" and transmitted via a "5.5-KHz subcarrier located above the video". This system would become known as DATE (Digital Audio for TElevision). What made date intriguing was that it would allow for high-quality stereo audio, in addition to quadraphonic audio, analog data, and the option to include a Secondary Audio Program (SAP) channel. PBS said that DATE "produces no perceptible picture degradation" and that the audio quality "is maintained at a 70-dB signal-to-noise ratio". Using DATE, according to PBS, would also lead to decreased operational costs and the need for separate facilities that would be needed to transmit high-quality audio. To receive DATE signals, stations required both an encoder and decoder.

While the DATE system sounded promising, PBS said that the system was never widely adopted due to "high cost". Decoders for the DATE system cost up to $11,000 in the mid-1980s. PBS recommended that a station purchase at least two decoders, one of these acting as a backup unit. By 1987, "less than half of PBS's member stations" could adequately decode and broadcast DATE audio signals due to these high costs and the lack of available parts.

=== 1978: Preparations for the Second-Generation, Satellite-Based Interconnection System ===
In August 1976, PBS submitted their proposal of a satellite-based interconnection system to the FCC. In December 1976, PBS, as well as NPR, received approval from the FCC regarding this proposal. PBS reached an agreement with Western Union in June 1976 to lease three full-time C-band transponders on the Westar 1 satellite, at orbital position 99°W, for a period of seven years (until 1985) at a cost of $800,000 per year; if PBS were to add a fourth transponder, this would cost $750,000 per year. The total cost of implementing this system was around $39,500,000 ($226,854,261.86 adjusted for inflation as of March 2026). The details of the contract with Western Union follow:

1. As stated earlier, PBS would least three transponders at a cost of $800,000 per year, with the option to add a fourth transponder, lowering the cost to $750,000 per year.
2. PBS would be guaranteed replacement transponders on Westar 1 or, if the satellite failed, replacement service on Westar 11 at orbital position 123.5ºW.
3. Western Union guaranteed that all public televisions stations would reliably receive PBS's signals.
4. There were no limits on the type of traffic PBS could uplink to satellite, meaning they were free to uplink various types of content such as television programming and data.
5. Western Union agreed to "[t]echnical performance limits" for each transponder PBS leased.
6. There were maximum limits on the overall movement and attitude of each satellite; this way, there would be no need to install "automatic satellite tracking capability."
7. PBS was granted free use of the transponders during implementation of the system, but only up to 300 hours. The free use of the transponders allowed public television stations to test signal reliability during installation of their ground stations.
8. Western Union would provide PBS with free engineering assistance during implementation of the system.

==== June 1977–March 1, 1978: The Implementation Phase ====
Implementation of the system began in June 1977. During implementation, the terrestrial interconnection system would continue to be operational. The first step was constructing a Main Organization Terminal (MOT) as the soon-to-be PBS SOC. Planning of the construction of the MOT took three years. The MOT was completed by the end of January 1978 Throughout 1977 and 1978, satellite dishes (ground stations) were installed at each public television station around the country. Western Union split the country into various segments during the implementation phase. The first two segments were based in the Southeastern and Southern portions of the country. Construction in Segment I was completed by February 1, while Segment II was completed by mid-April. WFSU (Orlando, Florida) was the first station to have a ground station installed. Segment III consisted of stations in the West Coast and Segment IV consisted of stations in the Rocky Mountains. Terrestrial service at each segment would continue for one month after the installation of the ground stations.

==== March 1, 1978–December 1978: The Launch Phase and End of the First-Generation Interconnection System ====
On March 1, 1978, PBS began uplinking on Westar 1, initially providing service on transponder 8 to 24 public television stations in the Southeastern portions of the country. This marked the launch of their second-generation interconnection system. With the completion of construction at Segments III and IV in mid-June, PBS launched service on transponders 9 and 11, both segments receiving satellite service on June 1. Two-thirds of public television stations were receiving satellite service by August. On July 1, the final terrestrial link, a time zone delay in Denver, Colorado, was shut down, marking the end of the first-generation interconnection system. At the end of September, over 95% of the new system had been completed, with PBS expecting full completion by December. At the end of 1978, 274 public television stations were now receiving programs via satellite. Beginning in 1980, PBS began leasing a fourth "occasional" transponder. In 1982, Westar 4 replaced Westar 1 in the same orbital position; PBS transferred their feeds to this new satellite. One primary advantage of Westar 4 was that it contained 24 transponders, compared to Westar 1's 12 transponders.

===== Direct/Dial Access Communication System (DACS) =====
To communicate with stations, PBS launched a service called the Dial (later Direct) Access Communications System (DACS). DACS launched in 1981. DACS, considered a form of "electronic mail," allowed PBS and its stations to communicate with each other about private matters. DACS was transmitted in Line 13 of the VBI of their satellite feeds. On July 21, 1995, a new communications system, known as PBS Express, launched. PBS Express launched alongside DACS, which would be discontinued in 1996. Stations now communicate private matters via myPBS, launched in 2013, which is where stations are alerted to new program offers from PBS and other distributors, any schedule changes, or program availability changes. Other station matters are also communicated via The Hub.

==== Introduction of NOLA Codes ====
For organizational purposes, PBS created a system to quickly identify programs they distributed. This system consisted of a four-letter code and a six-digit number. These codes were known as NOLA codes. It is unknown what – if any – meaning the abbreviation "NOLA" has. A simple NOLA code is formatted as such: [NOLA 000000]. These codes are assigned to every public television program distributed by APT, NETA, and PBS. For example, the Masterpiece series is assigned the NOLA code "MAST". Further, the complete NOLA code for episode one of the Downton Abbey series (broadcast as season 41, episode 01 of the Masterpiece franchise) would be: [MAST 004101]. Additional NOLA codes include "FRON" for Frontline, "GPER" for Great Performances, and "MLNH" for PBS News Hour.

=== 1987: Controversy Surrounding Potential Use of VideoCipher II ===
During this time, PBS did not utilize any type of encryption on their feeds. However, beginning in mid-1987, PBS began to explore the possibility of encoding their feeds with VideoCipher II. With PBS planning to encode their feeds with VideoCipher II, home-dish viewers of PBS's feeds began to voice concerns that PBS was preparing to encrypt their feeds. One of these viewers was named Diane Friedel Davis, who lived in St. Joe, Arkansas, a rural part of the state; she appeared before a congressional hearing on July 31, 1987, to discuss the recently proposed Satellite TV Fair Marketing Act. This act, as it relates to public broadcasting, stipulated, "No person shall encrypt or continue to encrypt satellite delivered Public Broadcasting Service programming intended for public viewing by retransmission by public broadcast stations." PBS had "serious reservations" about this and requested that this section be removed from the proposal. Michael E. Hobbs, the former Vice President of Policy and Planning for PBS, urged congress to remove this section. "We urge you to delete the section that prohibits PBS from scrambling: not because we want to scramble, but because the practical effect of that section would be to freeze public television in the backwater of an obsolescent technology, and deny real benefits to home dish owners and broadcast viewers alike," he said in a statement. In Diane's statement, she echoed the sentiment felt by home-dish viewers at the time by expressing her worry about PBS potentially encrypting their signals. "PBS… [does] not have a right to scramble our public airwaves," she said in her statement. In a written statement, she said that using a satellite dish was the only way for her to receive television broadcasts because not only would a television antenna not receive a signal, but the local cable company was not willing to travel such a long distance to establish service. "If a satellite dish is the only way a person can receive that signal, then he/she should be allowed access," she said in her written statement. She continued, "There are the farmers, the elderly, the physically challenged, and millions of rural Americans who, for one reason or another, live in remote and isolated areas of this vast country. For them, television is their window. Should these people be denied their First Amendment rights just because they do not live in urban or suburban areas where a television signal is received over a standard VHF antenna?"

According to PBS during the July 1987 hearing, VideoCipher II would not be used for general encryption purposes, but rather more efficient stereo audio and the opportunity to add other audio services, such as Descriptive Video Service or a Secondary Audio Program. David Hobbs later explained more concerning the reasoning for using VideoCipher II. "We are planning to use that technology to install stereo audio capability system-wide, a dream that we have had in public television for 20 years. We are also working on the development of Descriptive Video Services for the blind, and multi-lingual audio tracks for the non-English-speakers in our audience." Utilizing VideoCipher II would also be cheaper for PBS and its stations; VideoCipher II decoders cost an average of $500 and could be easily found on the market. He also made clear that PBS's proposal to use VideoCipher II did not mean eventual encryption. "We at PBS are proud to have worked vigorously since our earliest days to extend public television service to as many Americans as possible. …In keeping with that commitment, PBS has never scrambled any satellite transmission of our program service. We have not done so, and we have no plan to do so." In a later statement, he reaffirmed this point again by saying, "At the outset, I would like to say once again that PBS has no plans to encrypt its regular program transmissions." In April 1988, PBS began encoding programs with VideoCipher II. The feeds were usually broadcast in a "fixed key" mode (usually 0000), which allowed anyone with a VideoCipher II receiver to be able to receive these feeds. PBS, however, would encrypt the feeds anytime they aired what they referred to as "private communications," which include teleconferences and previews of programs that they haven't yet received broadcast rights for; all other programs remained unencrypted.

The use of VideoCipher II also created confusion among home-dish users who did not have a way to view content encoded with VideoCipher II since, "they have not been able to get reliable information as to the schedule for PBS's 'clear feeds.'" To combat this, PBS took several steps to accommodate these viewers: publishing schedules in satellite magazines, broadcasting nearly every "clear" program transmission on one transponder, broadcasting a slate showing a program schedule, creating an office to answer viewer questions, broadcasting an audio barker message to explain how to obtain a schedule, and sending viewers a monthly schedule of programs upon request.

=== 1991–1997: The Third-Generation Interconnection System ===
In 1987, PBS, along with the Corporation for Public Broadcasting (CPB), approached Congress with a request upgrade the interconnection system. On March 15, 1988, Bruce L. Christensen, the President of PBS at the time, appeared before a Senate committee to discuss the proposed Public Telecommunications Act of 1988. "The satellite currently used by public television (Westar 4) will run out of fuel by mid-1991, which means that public television must find new satellite capacity," he said in a statement. "Faced with a failing satellite and deteriorating ground facilities, public television must acquire a new satellite distribution system if it is to continue its present services, let alone provide new opportunities for all Americans, in the future." The proposal, "authorizes an additional $200 million to be used over a three year period to replace the satellite interconnection system."

The Public Telecommunications Act of 1988 became law on November 7, 1988, guarantee funding for the upgrade of PBS's interconnection system. This act included a provision stating that PBS must provide a "clear" feed of its programming to home-dish viewers who do not have a decoder. This act also created a committee to research and propose new plans regarding replacement of the satellite used for the interconnection system, known as the Public Television Interconnection Committee. The committee was made up of "designated representatives of the public stations". This committee approved a satellite replacement plan in December 1981, with PBS's board endorsing the plan. In this plan, PBS would continue to lease four C-band transponders starting in 1991, with the goal being to convert their satellite operations to Ku-band sometime in 1993 or 1994. In 1991, PBS purchased C-band transponder space on the Spacenet 1 satellite, owned by GTE, at orbital position 120°W. This move occurred on January 3, 1991. This began the third generation of PBS's interconnection system. The system was guaranteed to last at least 15 years, until 2006. PBS later moved their feeds to a new satellite, Spacenet 4, at orbital position 101°W, on July 18, 1992.

The move to Spacenet 1 and, later, Spacenet 4 was only a temporary solution. In 1989, an agreement was reached with AT&T for PBS to purchase transponder space on a new satellite named Telstar 401, which wouldn't launch until 1993. Six Ku-band transponders were purchased, but one C-band transponder was purchased; this C-band transponder was purchased to fulfill the "clear feed" requirement in the Public Telecommunication Act of 1988. This C-band feed was the "PBS-X" service. PBS's primary reason for converting to a Ku-band system was to take advantage of "more advanced technical capabilities available on Ku-band transponders," such as increased transponder bandwidth and an increase in the number of services that could be provided. PBS also wanted to create an "educational neighborhood" on Telstar 401 where other public educational services, including PBS's services, would be on the same satellite. PBS said that as many as 80 educational services would be provided via Telstar 401, allowing libraries, schools, and universities to access a multitude of programming on the same satellite. Telstar 401 launched on December 16, 1993. PBS moved to Telstar 401, at orbital position 97°W, on February 5, 1994, ending primary program distribution to affiliates via C-band. Telstar 402R, a satellite that launched to orbital position 89°W on September 24, 1995, would serve as a backup.

In 1994, with the launch of the Ku-Band feeds, PBS began testing DigiCipher I, the digital equivalent to VideoCipher. Initial tests proved to be successful, leading PBS to adopt DigiCipher I for all their services in August 1994. PBS had wanted to use the newest version of DigiCipher, known as DigiCipher II, but due to "delays in the adoption of MPEG-2," PBS said that they wouldn't be able to utilize DigiCipher II until "late 1995". Sometime in early 1996, PBS made the switch to DigiCipher II and, in the process, converted their services from analog to digital.

On January 11, 1997, at 6:15 a.m., Telstar 401 suffered a failure due to a coronal mass ejection. AT&T tried to re-establish contact with the satellite, but all attempts failed. To restore service, PBS temporarily moved their feeds to Telstar 402R (later Telstar 4). To prevent noticeable interruption to their service, PBS carried out a Satellite Service Recovery Plan. It took "less than 25 minutes" for PBS to switch service to Telstar 402R, preventing a severe disruption to their services. AT&T, the operator of the Telstar 401 and 402R satellites, granted PBS emergency use of one C-band and one Ku-band transponder on Telstar 402R. During time on Telstar 402R, PBS began researching options to restore full service. Two proposals from Loral Space Systems and GE American were submitted to PBS for consideration. These proposals are listed below:

==== Loral Space Systems ====
1. The contract submitted by Loral Space Systems was "conditioned on a successful launch of Telstar 5". There would be no protection for a launch failure "until late 1998."
2. PBS would continue to uplink services on Telstar 402R. PBS would be granted four Ku-band transponders on the satellite, in addition to one C-band and Ku-band transponder on Telstar 5.

==== GE American ====
1. GE American proposed giving PBS seven Ku-band transponders on GE-3, a satellite at orbital position 87W that launched on August 9, 1996. and one transponder on GE-1, located at 131W, for the non-contiguous U.S. (non-CONUS).
2. There was no certainty regarding when PBS would return to full service. GE American proposed that it would be "no later than February 1, 1998."
3. PBS would be granted a contract that would last nine years and, if needed, would be granted expansion of the contract.
4. There would be "[r]eliable in-orbit protection." GE American also said that there were "firm plans" for the launch of new satellites.
5. There was interest in re-establishing the "educational neighborhood" previously found on Telstar 401 before its failure. GE American even expressed interest in expanding the number of services if needed.

According to PBS, there was some hesitancy regarding Loral Space System's proposal. One concern was the sustainability of Telstar 402R. As for Telstar 5, the satellite had not been tested in orbit. Additionally, agreeing to this proposal meant that PBS would need to work with a new satellite provider. As for GE American's proposal, they would provide similar bandwidth as the bandwidth PBS used on Telstar 401. They added that, in the event of a failure, PBS could move their services to GE-1. GE-3, according to GE American, had a life expectancy of 15 years (until 2012). Furthermore, there was no risk to PBS if the launch of GE-3 failed or was delayed. GE American's contract was also cheaper than Loral Space System's contract. What's more, GE American already had an expansive customer list that included HSN, NBC, Time Warner (Court TV) and Viacom (MTV, Nickelodeon, and Showtime).

=== 1997–2006: The Fourth-Generation Interconnection System ===
The fourth generation of the interconnection system launched in 1997. On April 11, 1997, PBS moved forward with GE American and signed an agreement with them to provide full service to PBS. In the agreement, PBS would purchase seven Ku-band transponders on GE-3 and one C-band transponder on GE-1. The first transmission on GE-3 began on Sunday, October 5, 1997, at 12:01 a.m. ET; PBS completed the move to GE-3 on October 11, 1997, at 11:59 p.m. ET, and subsequentially, they shut down their services on Telstar 402R. There were not many major changes between the third and fourth generation interconnection systems; the primary difference was the transition to DigiCipher II. With the move completed, PBS would own transponders 18–24.

The first services to transition to GE-3 were the Adult Learning Service (Schedule 8) to transponder (henceforth "TX" when referring to transponder number) #20, PBS's DigiCipher I MCPC transponder (Schedules 5A0, 5A5, 5B1, 5B5, and 5B6) to TX #22, and station/regional feeds to TX #3. On October 6, leased analog and digital services on TX #9 and TX #18, respectively, were added. On October 15, PBS's MCPC feeds, now encoded in DigiCipher II, would be added to TX #24 (same schedules as the DigiCipher I transponder with the addition of Schedule 8). The DigiCipher I MCPC transponder would be removed on November 2 and new DTV test feeds would be added to TX #7. TX #9 would also become the home of The Business Channel, in addition to other analog services. In mid-November, services on three transponders were moved to other transponders: services on TX 9 move to TX 19, the DTV feed moved from TX 7 to TX 21, and services on TX 3 move to TX 23. Once the move was completed in the beginning of 1998, PBS would own TX 18–24 on GE-3.

The reason for purchasing one C-band transponder on GE-1 was because areas in the non-CONUS, such as stations in Alaska (KAKM) and the Caribbean islands (KGTF, PBS Guam), were outside the satellite footprint of GE-3. Since these stations would be unable to acquire programming from PBS's Ku-band services on GE-3, PBS simulcasted their primary services on one MCPC C-band transponder, transponder 3. The services on this transponder are as follows:

- Schedule 530 (500/PBS-X Ku)
- Schedule 531 (501 Ku)
- Schedule 532 (502 Ku)
- Schedule 533 (503 Ku)
- Schedule 534 (541 Ku and later 511 Ku)
- Schedule 535 (542 Ku and later 512 Ku)
- Schedule 536 (543 Ku and later 513 Ku)

==== Introduction of Package IDs ====
Starting around 2006, PBS began assigning Package IDs to programs; a Package ID is a six-digit number assigned to all programs distributed by PBS and provided to PBS from other public television distributors such as APT and NETA. Package IDs are unique to each program and episode in a series. Package IDs begin with the letter "P," followed by the six-digit number (e.g. P123456). When PBS first started using this numbering system, Package IDs always begin with "P1." As time has passed, PBS is now using numbers that begin with "P5," with numbers beginning with "P6" expected to start in late 2026. Different Package IDs can be assigned to the same program or episode depending on the program type, such as whether the program package is a Base, Embedded, Pledge, or Pledge Event package. For example, the Embedded version (a version with embedded promos) of a program may have a Package ID of P512345, but the Base version (a version without these promos) of that same program may have a package ID of P512346. Once a Package ID is assigned, it is seldom changed. However, if PBS re-releases a program after a length of time, the Package IDs will change. This will usually happen with programs originally produced in 4:3. To use an example, an airing of episode 1644 of Mister Rogers' Neighborhood from June 2017 had a Package ID of P379906. This package was an HD Upconverted Base 4:3 package. When the episode was rebroadcast in 2019, the package type was changed to Base and the Package ID changed to P514942. The Upconverted Base package is no longer in use.

Following the Package ID is three digits that correspond to each "repackaging," or each revision made to the program. The first release of a program will usually always be the first revision; for example, S02 E13 of Arthur currently (as of May 2025) has the following Package ID: P504300. When this package was first released sometime in 2020, the Package ID was P504300-001. The "-001" corresponded to the first revision of the program. When this episode was fed on HD03 on November 23, 2020, the program was revised and the Package ID changed to P504300-002. The revision number changes anytime PBS makes edits to the program, whether it's to update filler, funding, or alter the content to remove things such as profanity or to correct mistakes made during editing.

=== 2006–2018: The Fifth-Generation Interconnection System ===
In 2004, PBS published a proposal for the fifth generation of their interconnection system, known as the Next Generation Interconnection System (NGIS). PBS and the CPB expected the upgrade to cost $177 million. PBS had three reasons for upgrading the interconnection system, one of these being that their satellite contracts were scheduled to end on October 4, 2006. The current fourth generation interconnection system would be 15 years old in 2006; PBS said that this system "has run its course" and needed to be upgraded. Adding on to this, PBS wanted a new system that could fully support digital television. One other reason for the upgrade involved "[leveraging] new technologies to enhance efficiency and service to stations." PBS warned that the NGIS must be operational by October 4, 2006, otherwise, "PTV will be unable to function in its current form." One important aspect of the NGIS was that it would allow PBS to distribute programs in non-real time (NRT) by sending programs as digital video files to public television station by using a terrestrial Internet-based network. PBS said that the "vast majority" of programming would be sent via NRT distribution, a move away from the tape-based interconnection system currently in use. Files would be stored on "cache servers" at each public television station. Even with NRT program distribution, PBS was still committed to satellite distribution, but mainly reserved satellite distribution for live or near-live programs with a "short turnaround," such as A Capitol Fourth, Charlie Rose, and The NewsHour with Jim Lehrer; other programs besides these, such as children's programming and other general prerecorded programs, would still be fed via satellite. The NGIS would also revolve heavily revolve around the Internet, allowing public television stations and PBS to contact each other more easily.

PBS stated within their report that the NGIS would lead to "increased efficiency" of the distribution or programs. According to PBS, "smaller, financially strained, rural market" stations would air a program as it was being fed via satellite; this was done to save costs. This method led to many "redundant national program feeds," with PBS saying that one program would be fed "as many as five times or more" in a single day. Some of these refeeds would also occur due to weather interfering with satellite reception or due to problems recording the program to tape. In 2001, PBS distributed nearly 120,000 hours of programming through their interconnection system; according to PBS, "all but 7,000 hours were repeated programming" feeds. By using NRT distribution, these redundant feeds would be greatly reduced. The NGIS would also save be cheaper to operate, with station expected to save between $50,000 and $250,000 ever year. PBS expected this system to last about 10 years. The NGIS would launch in October 2006. When the new system launched, PBS launched a transponder that would carry IP data via satellite on two services called NR01 and NR02; these would be the services used for NRT program distribution. NR01 would feed national PBS programs and NR02 would sometimes feed programs from other distributors, such as NETA. Programs would be sent as MXF files. PBS also made the switch to DVB-S MPEG-2 when the new system was launched.

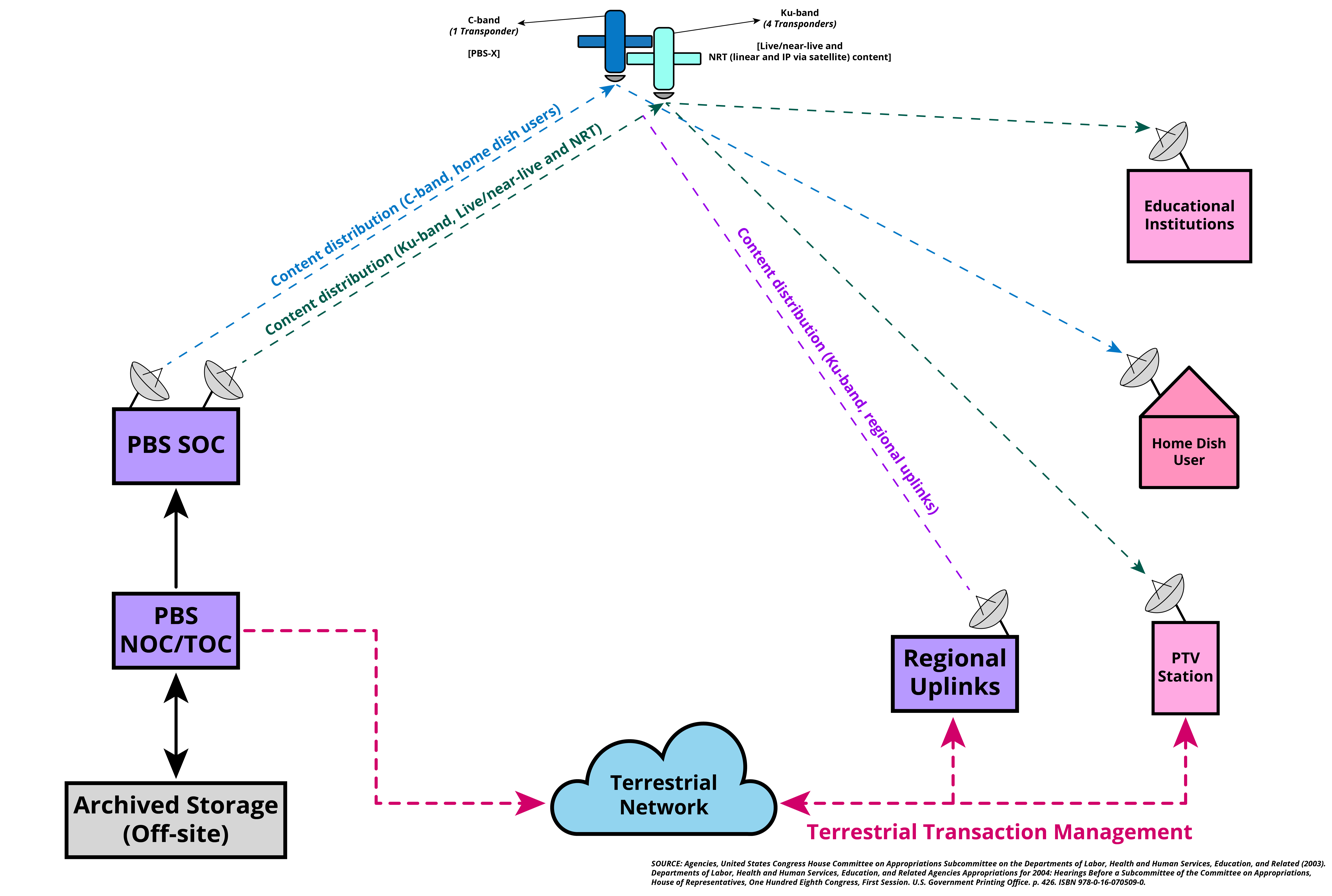
A brief overview of the NGIS. Both live/near-live and NRT (linear feeds and MXF files) content would be delivered via satellite. Terrestrial transactions would occur using the Internet. The NRT IP via satellite service was the highlight of the NGIS.

During planning for the NGIS, PBS considered seven different models for this interconnection system.

- The first model would've continued the current operations of the fourth generation interconnection system, with all programming being fed via satellite. The number of transponders would decrease from seven to six. PBS eliminated this model from consideration because they claimed that this was no longer an adequate option due to advancements in digital television; NRT distribution was also not possible.
- The second model was like the first model but would make use of a local "cache server" at the public television station. This model would have considerably decreased the number of transponders, going from seven to three. This model was eliminated for the same reasons as the first model.
- The third model incorporated both satellite and terrestrial distribution, in addition to "terrestrial transaction management". PBS selected this model due to its "reasonable cost and low risk".
- The fourth model would've reserved satellite distribution solely for real-time programming and terrestrial distribution solely for non-real time programming. This model was eliminated due to "high operational and implementation costs," with PBS saying the cost of this model would have been "double" that of the model selected for the NGIS.
- The fifth model was like the first model, an all-satellite distribution system, but would've incorporated both Ku-band and Ka-band satellite. PBS said that there was "significant risk" with this model because, at the time, Ka-band technology was "untested," meaning they had no "proven business model" of a Ka-band system operating without trouble. At that time, Ka-band satellites for commercial use did not exist, not to mention that investment costs that covered the satellite's lifespan could total up to $2 billion. PBS also didn't think "any satellite communications company will base their operation on public broadcasting's business".
- The sixth model would've created a terrestrial interconnection system that would've distributed all programs, both real-time and NRT. Satellite would continue to be used for "a small percentage of live and near-live programs," but terrestrial distribution would be the primary method of distribution. This model was eliminated due to "extremely high capital and operating costs," with this model expected to cost nearly three times the operating price of the current NGIS model. PBS noted that terrestrial distribution at this scale wasn't yet possible, but said, "In the future, this model may provide significant opportunities."
- The seventh model, the last to be considered, would use satellite to distribute live and near-live programs, but all other programs would be distributed to stations via "fixed media," such as DVDs. This method has similarities to the "bicycling tapes" system used by PBS before 1971 in that stations would receive a physical copy of programs, being DVDs in this case, through the mail, but these DVDs would not be sent to other stations after one station was finished broadcasting the program. This model was eliminated because it would have created "significant operational complexity" for the public television stations, in addition to there being an "extremely high operational cost and complexity and high risk."

In 2008, PBS switched to a new satellite, AMC-21, which would be in orbital position 125W. In October 2012, PBS began encoding their feeds in the DVB-S2 MPEG-4 codec, which they currently use.

=== Diagnosing Issues with the NGIS ===
==== Unreliable NRT Distribution ====
In June 2015, the CPB began to consider options for the sixth generation of PBS's interconnection system, known at the time as "v6". To help consider their options, they commissioned the help of Cognizant Technology Solutions to come up with a new cost-effective solution to improve the Public Television Interconnection System. A report discussing the proposed model for the sixth generation of the interconnection system was published in November 2015. Included in this report were the results of interviews with twelve public television stations, who were chosen as a representative sample of all public television stations; these stations were asked about their satisfaction with the fifth generation interconnection system, the NGIS (referenced in the report, and hereafter, as "v5"). Two-thirds of interviewed stations, eight out the chosen twelve, expressed dissatisfaction with the current version of the interconnection system. Overall, according to these stations, the v5 system was able to "effectively" distribute live and near-live content, but as for NRT content, this was where the v5 system failed. NRT program feeds were not "reliable" nor were they "consistent," and because of this, there were "many" stations, according to the report, that did not "fully [adopt] v5"; two stations that were interviewed "did not use the v5 system at all". Indeed, the delivery of NRT content was the biggest problem with the v5 system, with 90% of stations (based on the representative sample size described earlier) agreeing that receiving NRT content was problematic. While the v5 system excelled in delivering live content, it made up very little of the content distributed by the system, only 20%. For NRT content, stations looked for alternatives, such as using FTP (File Transfer Protocol) for content sharing, using other media movement software, or coming up with their own alternatives. Additionally, the Cognizant report cited three reasons as to why v5 was not widely adopted:

1. The overall design of the v5 system unsuitable for most stations.
2. There was poor communication regarding the switch to the v5 system.
3. There was inconsistency regarding implementation of the v5 system.

Along with the representative sample of twelve public television stations, public media entities (PBS, NPR, and American Public Television, hereafter "APT") were also interviewed about the v5 system and its challenges. For this report, Cognizant interviewed ten stakeholders from all three entities: five from PBS, two from APT, and three from NPR concerning the public radio interconnection system known as the Public Radio Satellite System (PRSS) – this paragraph will only focus on the public television interconnection system. Stakeholders from APT and PBS agreed that the v5 system delivered adequately live content, but they agreed that NRT delivery was "unreliable" and that this was the primary reason for why adoption of the v5 system was low. PBS suggested that there were a couple reasons that explained why the v5 system's NRT file delivery system was inadequate: failures with the then-new software used for NRT delivery and issues with formatting files for delivery. It was noted that these issues were resolved over time. Additionally, these twelve stations were also asked about the implementation of the proposed v6 system. There was overwhelming agreement (92%) that a new system was needed, but there was also a lot of apprehension (75%) concerning the rollout of this new system; indeed, the biggest risk concerned the rollout. Some stations were "wary of PBS's propositions for v6."

==== Limited Content Sharing ====
Another issue concerned the sharing of content. While nine out of the ten interviewed stations said that NRT distribution was the greatest challenge of the v5 system, one station said that Universal Uplink Capability, or the ability to share content via satellite, was their greatest challenge. This station expressed a desire to share their own content, such as documentaries and investigative reports, with other stations; however, they were unable to do so due to the costs of installing a satellite uplink system. Only 20 stations had uplink capabilities; some of these included the following, all of which had uplink capabilities during 2021 before a full transition to sIX: Connecticut Public Television (CPTV), KCET, New Mexico PBS (KNME), Maryland Public Television (MPT), South Carolina ETV (SCETV), WFSU, WGBH, WGVU, and WVIA.

=== The New "v6" System ===
There were three key elements that development of the new v6 system should focus on:

1. More reliable NRT content delivery.
2. Developing a terrestrial network that is "more cost-effective" than satellite.
3. Putting station collaboration, sharing content, at the forefront.

With that, Cognizant's recommendation was "that the system adopt a single interconnection system that is cloud-based, using mainly the public internet and an ecosystem of centralized master control service providers". The selected model would primarily utilize "a terrestrial fiber-based network," with satellite being used as a back-up. This system would decrease the number of transponders used by PBS from three to one. As part of this plan, PBS would switch their primary feeds back to the C-band spectrum beginning in March 2016; however, this transition never occurred. The transition to C-band would have only occurred if PBS consolidated their operations with NPR, which used C-band for their PRSS interconnection system. The primary plan was to transition linear program feeds via satellite, as well as programs fed via the NRT transponder, to the terrestrial-based system. One of the key benefits of the v6 system was that it would allow stations to send content to each other via FTP, allowing for P2P (peer-to-peer) sharing. This would greatly benefit stations that did not have satellite uplink capabilities, making content sharing much easier. By using an FTP client, all stations could easily send content to each other. However, stations could still receive physical media, such as tapes (usually HDCAM) and disks (usually XDCAM discs) "via courier service". These formats were usually bicycling formats.

The v6 system also allowed for cloud-based storage of content instead of local storage, which allowed for a more efficient approach to storing and managing content, as well as the possibility for a "joint master control" operations. The v5 system made it hard for stations to keep a local archive of programming because, if an archive reached capacity, programs would need to be deleted from their NRT servers to make room for additional programming. If a station wanted to air a program sometime in the future, a program that they had previously deleted, the program would need to be sent via the NRT system again. With the proposed v6 system, all content would reside in the cloud, meaning that if a station later wanted to re-air a program they had previously deleted from their servers, they could easily re-download the program since the content would always be available in the cloud. CPB expected this system to be completed and operational by May 2018, a goal that was met on time. The CPB tasked Vigor Systems, Inc. with developing and deploying the new interconnection system. According to Vigor, this interconnection system is known as sIX ("six"), the official meaning being "Service Interconnection." The first on-air test of sIX occurred on New Mexico PBS in late March 2018, the first program broadcast from this new system being an episode of Arthur.

==== sIX Overview ====
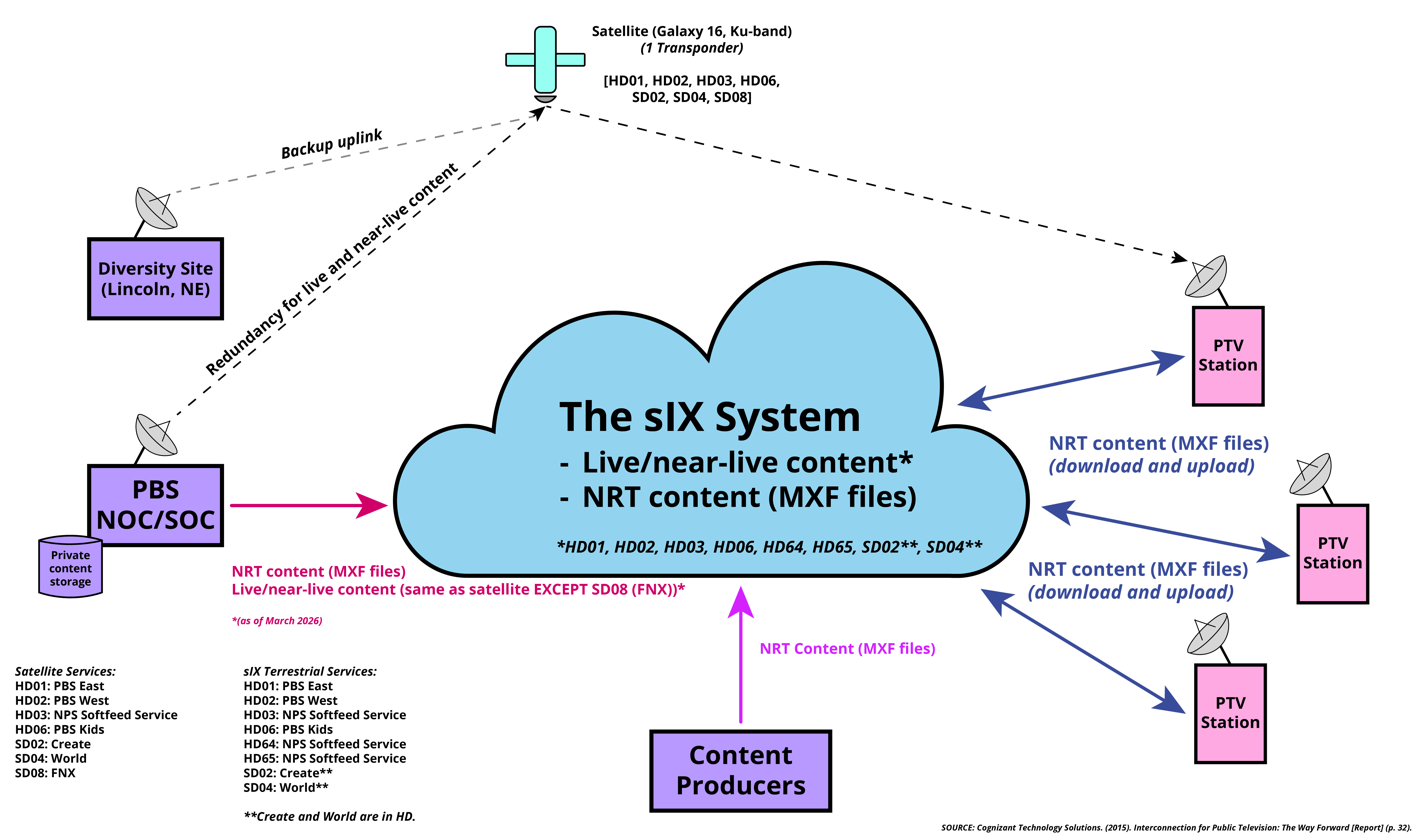
A brief overview of the sIX interconnection system. Live/near live content is distributed terrestrially and via satellite for redundancy. NRT content distribution is cloud-based. sIX allows stations and producers to share content amongst each other at a greater scale than before.

PBS, its affiliates, and its partners upload content to a central cloud-based hub that allows stations to download content that will later be broadcast. sIX is based on OneVigor's PitchBlue distribution platform, which is used by networks such as CBS. To manage content, stations make use of either the Myers ProTrack or OneVigor platforms. Downloaded programs are then saved to online servers known as Edisen Edge servers (formerly known as MagnuBoxes). Uploads of programming to sIX occur at different times; for example, a new episode of a program may be uploaded to sIX approximately 12 hours before the program feeds on HD01. Other times, uploads may be scheduled for specific dates and times. There are times when an entire season of a program becomes available at once and other times where episodes of programming are uploaded weekly. Some programs, such as premieres of new episodes of Amanpour & Company, Democracy Now!, and Frontline, in addition to live events, are not initially available via sIX as downloadable files; they are only available through the linear satellite or terrestrial feeds of HD01 and HD02 (for Amanpour & Company and Frontline) or linear terrestrial feeds of HD64 and HD65 (for Democracy Now!, BBC News programs, and NHK programs). However, episodes of these programs – except Amanpour & Company, BBC News programming, and all NHK programming – will later be uploaded to sIX after the initial satellite and terrestrial feed. Programs also have an expiration date; once this date arrives, the file is removed from the sIX platform and can no longer be downloaded. Program files are always delivered in the MXF OP1a container (regardless if a program is in HD or UHD) with most HD programs encoded in the XDCAM HD422 codec (MPEG-2 Long GOP @ 50Mbit/s), which is the preferred delivery format for PBS. Other codecs that are approved for use when delivering in HD are three versions of the DNxHD codec: DNx145, DNx220, and DNx220x. For UHD content, PBS has approved three versions of the DNxHR codec: DNxHR HQ, DNxHR HQX, and DNxHR 444.

Funds for sIX were previously provided by the Corporation for Public Broadcasting, but due to the corporation's closure on January 5, 2026, it is unclear where funding for the system will now come from. In late January, after CPB's closure, it was reported that CPB awarded a final $12 million grant directly to stations to help fund both public television (sIX) and radio (PRSS) interconnection.

=== Transition away from satellite (2016-2026) ===
With initial tests of sIX throughout 2018 proving successful, PBS discontinued their NRT (non-real-time) file-based services on AMC-21, NR01 and NR02, created as part of the NGIS interconnection system, on January 2, 2019; with the closure of the NGIS NRT service, this marked the official launch of the sIX system. The goal was to move all linear-fed content to sIX in the near future. PBS has expressed that they will continue to lease transponder space for live and near-live programs, such as the PBS NewsHour; PBS will also continue to lease transponder space in the event their sIX system suddenly fails or experiences an outage. According to New Mexico PBS (KNME), "99% of Public Television Stations have successfully implemented sIX functionality".

As the transition to sIX has progressed, PBS began to shut down some of their NPS satellite distribution feeds. The first feed to shut down was PBS's SD01 service, shutting down on September 5, 2016; this occurred before the transition to sIX. Two years later, as previously mentioned, the NRT file-based service was shut down sometime near the end of 2018. On March 4, 2019, PBS's C-Band feed on SES-3 (103°W) was discontinued, leaving PBS with no active C-band transponders for the first time. On November 13, 2019, PBS discontinued their SD07 Ku-band service on AMC-21, which was uplinked from SCETV in Columbia, South Carolina. All programming on SD07 could be found on HD04, albeit in HD.

The transition to sIX accelerated in March 2021 when APT began to transition select programs off satellite and into the sIX system. In July 2021, programming from the NETA and APT migrated fully to sIX, ending distribution via satellite. However, two programs from APT – Consuelo Mack WealthTrack and GZERO World with Ian Bremmer – continue to be fed via satellite on HD03 on Fridays. Program uplinks from KNME, with the exception of Democracy Now! until the closure of the HD05 service on May 31, 2023, also migrated to sIX. PBS themselves had also migrated many regular, non-news linear feeds to sIX, including feeds of pledge programs, which were last fed in May 2021. The only content left on their three (at the time) primary NPS HD distribution feeds, HD03, HD04, and HD05, was news and public affairs programming. On July 21, 2021, a few weeks after this transition, PBS decommissioned two more satellite feeds, SD05 and SD06, at 2:56 p.m. ET.

On January 20, 2023, PBS's main transponder on AMC-21 (which included HD01-HD03, HD06, SD02, SD04, and SD08) began simulcasting on Galaxy 16, a satellite at orbital position 99°W. On May 3, 2023, a ticker appeared on HD04 and HD05 alerting that both services would shut down on June 1, 2023, at 00:00 UTC (May 31, 2023, 8:00 p.m. ET); the ticker was later updated on May 25, 2023, with a new shutoff date of May 31, 2023, at 23:59:59 p.m. ET (11:59:59 p.m. ET). In the ticker, PBS said that program feeds on HD04 and HD05 would move to two new terrestrial-based services, HD64 and HD65. On May 31, 2023, at 11:58:52 p.m. ET, PBS completed the move to Galaxy 16. HD04 and HD05 were decommissioned at the same time.

In 2024, PBS started testing new terrestrial feeds as part of their sIX interconnection system. These services are the same as the current satellite feeds on Galaxy 16 (HD01, HD02, HD03, HD06, Create, and World). A terrestrial feed of HD03 launched on the sIX platform in December 2024. FNX will be added at a later date. This is part of a new phase on the sIX rollout known as Phase F2, which is currently ongoing. It is not known whether PBS will decommission the satellite feeds once Phase F2 is complete. For now, stations record programs from both the satellite and terrestrial feeds, with one or the other acting as a backup. The sIX file-based system also acts as a backup.

=== 2026: The Transition Nears Completion ===
On June 22, 2026, LTN Global, a media technology company, released a press release announcing that PBS had selected LTN as the new distributor for their current NPS services. Per the press release, an agreement was made to implement "a fully-managed IP network" capable of distributing all nine of PBS's current services, including all services available via satellite and the HD64/HD65 terrestrial services. Work on this new system would "begin immediately".

On November 3, 2026, more details about PBS's decision to select LTN were released. In this release, it was announced that "by the end of 2026," PBS would completely transition away from satellite, all NPS services now being provided directly to member stations via the newly established IP network created by PBS and LTN.

==== The Reasons for the Transition ====
As of November 2026, the current interconnection system is a hybrid satellite/IP systtem. In short, prerecorded content is distributed solely via IP as MXF files, while live/near-live programming is distributed via satellite and via IP; in this case, satellite acts as a backup. This has been PBS's model dating back to 2018, when the sIX system first launched, though live/near-live programming was not distributed via IP until 2023.

A major reason for the transition was due to the U.S. Congress rescinding federal funding for public broadcasting, which in turn, led to the closure of the Corporation for Public Broadcasting (CPB). Congress was the "primary funding source" for PBS and its interconnection system, the funds being disbursed by the CPB. With these funds now gone, executives at PBS began to analyze the current interconnection system to figure out cost savings while still providing adequate service to all member stations. While analyzing the current hybrid system, the terrestrial system being an MLPS (Multilayer Protocol Switching) system, PBS began to see a few faults with the current system. Dana Golub, PBS's VP of strategic infrastructure initiatives, has said that the current hybrid system uses a "single-threaded" configuration due to cost factors and noted that the satellite system "doesn't actually cover all our our live channels." Golub said that the entire interconnection system and needed to be "dissect[ed]" and all its current costs assessed.

During the spring in 2026, PBS drafted a "very robust RFP (request for proposal)" for a new plan to update the current interconnection system. During this stage, PBS saw potential in LTN's proposal for a fully terrestrial, IP-based system. PBS has stated that this new system is a more affordable, effective solution for content distribution. Discontinuing distribution via satellite would be a cost-saving measure. Rick Young, SVP of LTN's global products group, has stated that, based on network who have made similar moves from satellite to IP, they have "reported a 50% cost reduction" as a result of transitioning away from satellite. PBS's Golub added that only "about 20" of the programming provided by PBS is live/near-live, the other 80% being pre-recorded, file-based content. Another issue that made PBS search for an alternative distribution method was that the Galaxy 16 satellite, the satellite that hosts many of PBS's NPS feeds, is "nearing end of life," meaning PBS would have needed to renegotiate with its current satellite provider, Intelsat, for placement on a new satellite, or another provider altogether, such as SES.

==== sIX Rollout Phases ====
The rollout of sIX is occurring in several phases:

- Phase 1 (circa 2016 - January 2, 2019) involved phasing out the NGIS NRT file-based Ku-band transponder and moving content to sIX.
- Phase 2 (2020 - circa 2022), according to a May 2021 report from the CPB, involved "consider[ing] future options for the delivery of linear and live content." The report says that later stages will be "defined as business and technology needs evolve."
- Phase C (2022 - 2023) focused on station content contribution to the sIX system.
- Phase F1 (2022 - May 31, 2023) involved transitioning feeds from the HD04 and HD05 satellite services to the new HD64 and HD65 terrestrial services.
- Phase F2 (2023–present) involves rolling out terrestrial services that mirror the services uplinked via satellite.

== Services ==
The services currently available via Ku-band satellite on Galaxy 16 at 99°W are listed below (Lyngsat). These services, except FNX, are also provided via the sIX interconnection system.

- Montana PBS (Note: In Standard-Definition via satellite only.) (this transponder is independent of PBS's other feeds)
- HD01 (PBS East) (Note: In High-Definition via satellite and the sIX interconnection system.)
- HD02 (PBS West)
- HD03 (NPS Feed)
- HD06 (PBS Kids Channel)
- SD02 (Create (TV network)) (Note: In HD via the sIX interconnection system only.)
- SD04 (World Channel)
- SD08 (FNX)

Discontinued Feeds:

- HD04 (NPS Feed, SCPC) (December 10, 2008 - May 31, 2023; replaced with HD64 terrestrial feed.)
- HD05 (NPS Feed, SCPC) (June 2013 - May 31, 2023 replaced with HD65 terrestrial feed.)
- SD01 (NPS Feed) (December 9, 2008 - September 5, 2016)
- SD03 (V-me) (December 9, 2008 - March 2017)
- SD05 (NPS Feed, SCPC) (December 10, 2008 - July 21, 2021)
- SD06 (NPS Feed, SCPC) (December 10, 2008 - July 21, 2021)
- SD07 (NPS Feed, SCPC) (December 10, 2008 - November 13, 2019)

== Overview of Past Services ==
=== Schedules A-E (1978 - August 15, 1994) ===
Throughout much of their history on satellite, PBS utilized four transponders corresponding to a different "Schedule," namely 'Schedule A,' 'Schedule B,' 'Schedule C,' and 'Schedule D'. Another feed, Schedule E, launched in 1988. Also starting around 1988, PBS would begin displaying an on-screen schedule on their feeds; this was in response to confusion and concerns from home dish users concerning schedule availability. PBS did previously display a schedule of upcoming program feeds on their services, but sometimes, instead of listing program names, they used NOLA codes. PBS would later drop the practice of on-screen schedules starting around 1996.

=== Schedules 5A0-8 (August 15, 1994 - 1997) ===
On August 15, 1994, to coincide with an ongoing transition to digital, PBS launched nine new services to replace the former A, B, C, D, and E feeds, namely: 5A0, 5A5, 5B0, 5B5, 5B6, 6, 7L, 7U, and 8. Some of these services, such as Schedule 5A0 and 5A5, shared the same MCPC transponder. PBS utilized four transponders on Telstar 401 during this time, transponders 5–8. Transponder 5 was a digital transponder and was reserved for PBS full-time. Transponders 6-8 were analog and were shared transponders, meaning other educational services would utilize the transponders for a period during the day; however, PBS had full control over these transponders during weekends.

=== Schedules 500-505, 511-515, and 540-543 (1997 - February 11, 2009) ===
In late 1997, PBS began renaming the virtual channel numbers for each service they operated. PBS was granted use of virtual channels numbers starting at 500 and ending at 599. This change coincided with a switch to DigiCipher II. During this time, in November 1997, PBS launched new services that would replace the 5A0-8 services, which were DigiCipher I services. See below:

- Schedule 5A0: Replaced with Schedule 501.
- Schedule 5A5: Replaced with Schedule 502.
- Schedules 5B0, 6, 7L, and 7U: Discontinued.
- Schedule 5B1: Replaced with Schedule 500 (PBS-X).
- Schedules 5B5 and 5B6: No equivalents. Programming from these services would be split primarily among Schedules 504 and 505, which would launch on October 12, 1997, and Schedules 541, 542, and 543 (later named 511, 512, and 513 in mid-November 1997).
- Schedule 8: Replaced with Schedule 503 (DigiCipher II) and 520 (analog) (Adult Learning Service)

Schedules 504 and 505 launched on October 12, 1997. Also in October, Schedules 541-543 were launched. Schedules 501–503, in addition to Schedules 504 and 505, were soft-feed services, which would feed programs to station in advance of the program's air date. Schedules 501–505 were the primary NPS feeds used for distributing programming, in addition to three SCPC feeds, Schedules 511–513. Schedule 511 was the primary feed for APT content, in addition to other SD content; this service originated from CPTV in Hartford, CT, most of the time. Schedule 512 was reserved for regional uplinks and other SD content. Schedule 513 was the primary feed for NETA content and other SD content; this service originated from SC ETV in Columbia, SC, for most of the time. Around 1998, PBS added a new service for regional uplinks known as Schedule 514; it is unknown when this service shut down or what content was fed. Schedule 505, based on available information, was decommissioned by PBS around April 2007 and was replaced with the Vme channel. Another new service, Schedule 515, launched in 2006; this would become the feed for the Create channel. Other full-time services were Schedules 500 (PBS-X) and later 540 (PBS-X West), 541 (PBS Kids channel until 2005), 542 (PBS You until 2005), and 543 (PBS-X East).

==== Adult Learning Service ====
During its operation, the PBS Adult Learning Service (ALS) fed programming via satellite, offering college telecourses and other adult education programs. When the service launched on August 29, 1981, feeds occurred on Schedule A during weekends. During weekdays from 9:00 a.m. to 5:00 a.m. ET, ALS feeds were on Schedule D. During the digital transition in August 1994, ALS feeds moved to Schedule 7U. The feed times remained unchanged. With the launch of Schedule 503 in 1997, ALS feeds moved to this service. The ALS was most active during academic semesters, mainly during the Fall semester (August–December) and Spring semester (January–May), though there would be occasional "blockfeeds" (multiple episodes of one program, usually more than two episodes, fed in a row) during the months of June and July. In addition to PBS programs produced for the ALS, programs from Annenberg/CPB were also fed on this service. The ALS was discontinued in September 2005.

=== The Beginning of the HD Transition ===
==== DT1A, DT1B, DT1C, DT2A, and DT3A ====
===== DT1A-DT1C (Appx. Late 2005 - November 2006) =====
DT1A-DT1C were duplicates of the existing DigiCipher II PBS-X feeds: Schedules 500 (PBS-X), 540 (PBS-XP), and 543 (PBS-X). DT1A-DT1C, however, were DVB services. These services launched around late 2005 as PBS began to transition away from DigiCipher II. All programming that aired on 500, 540, and 543 aired at the same time on DT1A-DT1C. DT1A was a simulcast of 500, DT1B was a simulcast of 543, and DT1C was a simulcast of 540. DT1A-DT1C was on TX (transponder) #21, while the legacy DigiCipher II feeds (500, 540, and 543) were on TX #20. PBS shut down their DigiCipher II MCPC feeds around September 2006; the new DVB MCPC feeds launched on the same transponder. TX #20 shut down around November 2006. After this transition, PBS ceased using the DT1A-DT1C names for the three PBS-X feeds.

===== DT2A (March 1, 2004 - December 21, 2008) =====
On March 1, 2004, PBS launched a new HD service called DT2A, which would become the PBS HD Channel. This service broadcast a small variety of born HD and HD upconverted programs. As the years progressed, more HD programming was added to the service. With DT2A being the only national HD service PBS provided at the time, primetime programming from 8:00 p.m. ET to 11:00 p.m. ET would be repeated three hours later, from 11:00 p.m. ET to 2:00 a.m. ET, to benefit stations on the West coast.

===== DT3A (Early 2008 - December 21, 2008) =====
DT3A launched in early 2008. DT3A was the primary HD soft feed channel that was used to feed HD content to stations, such as HD broadcasts of the PBS NewsHour (then known as The NewsHour with Jim Lehrer).

==== December 2008: Full Transition (HD01-HD04 and SD01-SD07) ====
In December 2008, with the transition to HD, PBS launched new services that would phase out and consolidate some of their existing SD services. SD01-SD04 launched on December 9, 2008; HD04 and SD05-SD07 launched on December 10, 2008; and HD01-HD03 launched on December 21, 2008; all launching at 6:00 a.m Eastern. Programming on HD04 began on December 21, 2008. Programming on SD01 began on February 11, 2009. SD01, SD03, SD05, SD06, and SD07 are now defunct. DT2A and DT3A were discontinued on December 21, 2008, at 6:00 a.m, HD01 and HD02 replacing both services. Schedules 500 (PBS-X), 501–504, and 540 (PBS-XP) were discontinued on February 11, 2009.

SD01 was a new "soft feed" service and would serve as the main service to distribute PBS content produced in SD. Teleconferences and other SD content from other distributors would be on this service. A few services were renamed during this transition. Service 515, Create, was renamed SD02; Service 505, V-me, was renamed SD03; Service 506, World, was renamed SD04. In addition, SD05 would replace Schedule 511, SD06 would replace Schedule 512, and SD07 would replace Schedule 513. HD01 would become the main HD feed of PBS programming, becoming the PBS East feed. This service incorporated feeds from Schedule 500 (PBS-X), Schedule 501, Schedule 502, and DT2A (the former PBS HD Channel). PBS-X feeds that moved to HD01 included the weekend schedule of programs and "late night NPS repeats". Feeds of kids programming during the weekday on Schedule 501 and primetime "ETZ" (Eastern Time Zone) feeds from Schedule 502 also moved to HD01. HD02 would be a three-hour delay of HD01, serving as the PBS West feed. Like HD01, primetime feeds from Schedule 502 would move here, but only the "PTZ" (Pacific Time Zone) feeds. HD02 was the replacement for DT3A; soft feeds on DT3A would move to HD03. Schedule 540 feeds (PBS-XP) moved to HD02. HD03 would become the main service used by PBS to distribute HD content to stations. This service would carry content such as soft feeds, promo reels (from PBS and APT), pledge feeds, preview feeds, and other distributor content, such as content from APT.

HD04 would be the first HD SCPC feed. This service would have minimal content from PBS and would instead distribute content from other distributors, such as NETA, or other regional uplinks. This feed was the primary feed for NETA programming until July 2021, when all NETA programs moved to sIX. This feed was used solely for affiliate uplinks, with the exception of a few programs on HD05, usually from KNME. APT utilized this service to sometimes feed HD promo reels as well. Daily feeds on HD04 included four feeds of BBC News programming (two feeds of BBC World News, BBC World News Outside Source, and BBC World News America, with BBC World News Today airing weekly on Fridays), and six feeds of NHK Newsline originating from Connecticut Public Television. This feed shut down on May 31, 2023. The final feed was an 11:00 p.m ET airing of BBC News.

==== June 2013: Launch of HD05 ====
In June 2013, PBS launched their HD05 feed. HD05, like HD04, was occasionally uplinked from various sites as well as the PBS NOC. Pledge feeds were likely to be uplinked on this feed as well during pledge seasons until February 2021, when nearly all pledge feeds moved to HD03. Daily feeds on HD05 included two feeds of Democracy Now! (originating from KNME) and two feeds from DW (DW News and The Day). Weekly feeds included a feed of DW's Euromaxx on Tuesdays and a feed of White House Chronicle on Fridays. Other weekly feeds included a feed of Florida Crossroads on Monday and Capitol Update on Fridays and Saturdays (originating from WFSU), as well as two back-to-back feeds of Market to Market (originating from Iowa PBS). HD05 did serve as the feed reserved for live political events covered by the PBS NewsHour. These broadcasts were originally fed on SD05 until the feed was shut down on July 21, 2021. This feed shut down on May 31, 2023. The final feed was a 4:30 p.m ET airing of DW's The Day.

==== October 2016: Launch of HD06 ====
The newest feed to be launched by PBS was their HD06 feed in October 2016, initially airing only a test pattern. This feed was reserved for the new iteration of the PBS Kids channel, which launched in January 2017.

== Current satellite services ==
PBS's National Program Service is freely and nationally available from the designated Ku-band broadcast satellites using free-to-air satellite dishes as small as 30 inches. Before PBS's transition to their new interconnection system in July 2021, the three (at the time) 'Schedule' feeds (HD03, HD04, HD05) used to broadcast different programs at various times throughout the day, with weekends and late night hours usually having no feeds. Some program feeds were only temporary and were usually not consistent. PBS would usually feed programs a few days to as long as a few weeks in advance. The former SD05 and SD06 services were rarely utilized, usually showing a test pattern for the whole day, though SD05 would occasionally show live feeds of major political events, such as confirmation hearings for new Supreme Court justices and, more recently, the entirety of the first and second impeachment trials of former President Donald Trump. SD05 (and sometimes SD06) was also used to host teleconferences from APT. The next few paragraphs will only discuss the HD services provided by PBS (HD01, HD02, HD03, and HD06). All services, including SD02, SD04, and SD08, are uplinked from the PBS NOC 24/7.

=== HD01 and HD02 ===
HD01 and HD02 are the two primary services provided by PBS. HD02, as previously described, is a three-hour delay of HD01 that follows the Pacific Time Zone. Both services feed select programs from PBS's library only – programming from other distributors, such as APT and NETA, do not feed on these services. Both services are pre-packaged services with no program slates. The PBS Kids block of programs feeds from 6:00 a.m. ET/9:00 a.m. PT to 2:00 p.m. ET/5:00 p.m. PT on weekdays and from 6:00 a.m. ET/9:00 a.m. PT to 1:00 p.m. ET/4:00 p.m. PT on weekends. Both services also feed PBS News Hour and Amanpour & Company on weekdays. Premieres of new programming feed during primetime on weekdays. Both services do not include an embedded logo bug during programming, unlike programming seen on local stations, the reason being that since these services are delivered to stations, they require clean feeds so they can overlay their own specific on-screen logo bug during programming. In lieu of standard promos and bumpers seen on local stations (i.e. "coming up next" bumpers or time-specific promos with time frames such as "Tonight at 7 p.m./6 p.m. Central"), filler material fills the remaining time until the next program feed. Until 2021, however, PBS did air time-specific promos during program breaks and a 10-second ID. One second of black precedes and follows each program feed. All programming, except for live programming or programming with a short turnaround time (Amanpour & Company, Firing Line with Margaret Hoover, PBS News Hour, and Washington Week) is also available to stations on-demand via the sIX system.

=== HD03 ===
HD03 was the sole service for pre-feeding PBS programs before the transition to sIX. This service was also the primary service for a majority of programs from APT until July 2021, when all APT programs (except for Consuelo Mack WealthTrack and GZERO World with Ian Bremmer) moved to sIX. This service mostly fed soft feeds, pre-feeds, and until January 2020, promo reels (which have moved to PBS Source, which is where promos and other promotional material are hosted). Weekday feeds on HD03 include two feeds of the Eastern broadcast of PBS News Hour (the second feed, an updated program called PBS News Hour West, was produced until December 19, 2025) and one feed of Amanpour & Company every weekday. Consuelo Mack WealthTrack, GZERO World with Ian Bremmer, MotorWeek, To the Contrary with Bonnie Erbé, and White House Chronicle continue to be fed on Fridays. On January 16, 2026, two new programs were added to the Friday schedule: Compass Points from PBS News and Horizons from PBS News, these programs replacing PBS News Weekend, which was canceled on January 11, 2026. The service is also used to feed repackaged versions (usually versions with synchronized captions and "Previously Recorded" logos) of live programs such as A Capitol Fourth, the National Memorial Day Concert, and live episodes of Great Performances.

On April 21, 2025, at 9:59 a.m. ET, PBS changed the design of the HD03 feed after 16 years (since 2009). For all on-screen text, PBS uses their custom-made font known as PBS Sans. Previously, the bold version of Arial was used. The service name is now in all capital letters, whereas before, only the "S" in "Schedule" and the service name were capitalized. A new PBS NOC logo replaces the former "PBS NOC" text. The clocks on the old design, which showed both Eastern and Pacific Time, have been removed and replaced with a singular clock showing Eastern Time only, which is located in the bottom-right of the 4:3 SMPTE color bars, which remains unchanged except for the removal of "PBS NOC" text in the bottom-left of the 4:3 color bars. The current date is no longer displayed on-screen. There is now also a new slate that airs before refeeds of programs on HD03; this marks the first time PBS has alerted stations to a refeed on their NPS satellite soft-feed services using an on-screen slate since 2006. No information about the upcoming program feed is given. The on-screen text reads, "REFEED ADVISORY," followed by "REFEED INCOMING...". A link to a page on myPBS is provided to direct stations to information about the refeed. Visiting this link, however, produces an HTTP 404 error. Additionally, as mentioned before, myPBS is PBS's private intranet and can only be accessed by necessary station personnel.

=== HD06 ===
HD06 is the primary service for the PBS Kids channel. Unlike HD01 and HD02, an embedded on-screen logo bug is always displayed during programming, the location being the bottom-left corner. While all programming on the PBS Kids channel is available to stations on-demand via sIX, the specific packages that air on HD06, which include the embedded PBS Kids logo, are not – these packages are exclusive to HD06 due to each package containing embedded promotions for other programs on HD06. Like HD01 and HD02, filler material fills remaining time between program feeds and one second of black precedes and follows each program feed.

== Various videos of the service ==
- https://www.youtube.com/watch?v=phF2IsbBt84 (Schedule B, May 10, 1990; electronic programming guide showing a schedule for part of the current day's programs)
- https://www.youtube.com/watch?v=-S80WKV67sY (Schedule B, March 17, 1992; EPG showing the day's programs)
- https://www.youtube.com/watch?v=gTvdHsI3VzY (PBS-X, 1994; PBS ident with a schedule of programs and a looped text message reading, "On this transponder, you'll find programs from the PBS National Program Service and programs from other Public TV distributors as well.")
- https://www.youtube.com/watch?v=Y0peKirF1SI (PBS-X, 1995; 5-second ident saying, "You're watching PBS. Viewer supported public television.")
- https://www.youtube.com/watch?v=9K6YiPSEsvU (2001; During 9/11 The NewsHour With Jim Lehrer credits before PBS Kids)
- https://www.youtube.com/watch?v=MwiCfrngm-Q (HD01, 2018; PBS Promos before Mister Rogers' Neighborhood)
- https://www.youtube.com/watch?v=gE1mmx8US8A (Schedule SD01, July 1, 2016)
- https://www.youtube.com/watch?v=ps9w_Q8POfo (Schedule HD03, July 6, 2016; Test Pattern and slate seen before Charlie Rose; this was the previous design before the April 21, 2025, update.)
- https://www.youtube.com/watch?v=7bdGQL4FPj4 (Schedule HD04, June 16, 2021; Test pattern and slate seen before that day's edition of BBC World News America.)
- https://www.youtube.com/watch?v=JdhbQeb8L0A (Schedule HD05, August 31, 2020; Test pattern and slate seen before a pledge program titled Ken Burns: The Civil War.)
- https://www.youtube.com/watch?v=TO7saQEQDTE (HD04/HD05 shutdown notice with a scrolling ticker at the bottom, May 3, 2023.)
- https://www.youtube.com/watch?v=JZ64_5YqHco (HD03, April 23, 2025; Test pattern and slate seen before that day's updated feed of PBS News Hour, referred to as PBS News Hour West; this is the current design.)
- https://www.youtube.com/watch?v=qZwm1pgiD0Y (HD03, May 7, 2025; Test pattern followed by a slate alerting to an upcoming refeed. This refeed was for an episode of Frontline.)
