= SES-10 =

Geostationary communications satellite

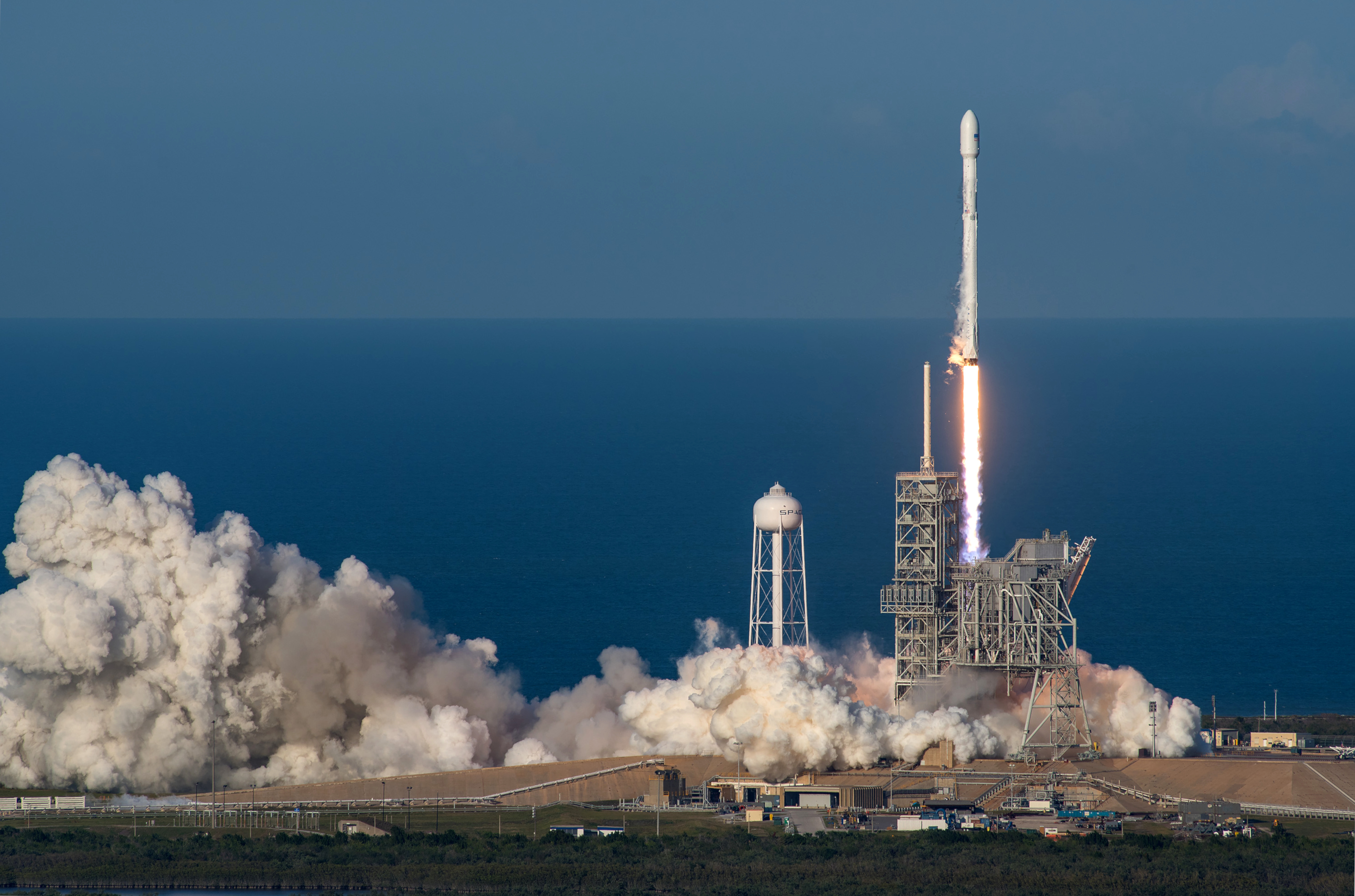
- Falcon 9 Flight 32, a retrofitted orbital class rocket, launching SES-10.
- Names: Simón Bolivar-2
- Mission type: Communications
- Operator: SES
- COSPAR ID: 2017-017A
- SATCAT no.: 42432
- Website: https://www.ses.com/
- Mission duration: 15 years (planned); 9 years, 29 days (elapsed)

Spacecraft properties
- Spacecraft type: Eurostar
- Bus: Eurostar-3000
- Manufacturer: Airbus Defence and Space
- Launch mass: 5,282 kg (11,645 lb)
- Power: 13 kW

Start of mission
- Launch date: 30 March 2017, 22:27:00 UTC
- Rocket: Falcon 9 Full Thrust
- Launch site: Kennedy Space Center, LC-39A
- Contractor: SpaceX
- Entered service: 15 May 2017

Orbital parameters
- Reference system: Geocentric orbit
- Regime: Geostationary orbit
- Longitude: 67° West

Transponders
- Band: 55 Ku-band
- Bandwidth: 36 Mhz
- Coverage area: Central America, Caribbean, South America, Brazil

SES-10, is a geostationary communications satellite awarded in February 2014, owned and operated by SES and designed and manufactured by Airbus Defence and Space on the Eurostar-3000 satellite bus. It is positioned at the 67° West position thanks to an agreement with the Andean Community to use the Simón Bolivar-2 satellite network. It replaces AMC-3 and AMC-4 to provide enhanced coverage and significant capacity expansion.

The satellite has a pure Ku-band payload with 55 transponders offering direct-to-home (DTH) broadcasting and enterprise and broadband connectivity. Its three wide beams cover Mexico and the Caribbean, Brazil, and Spanish-speaking South America.

After several delays, SES-10 was launched on 30 March 2017 aboard a Falcon 9 Full Thrust. The launch marked the first time in aerospace history that an orbital-class first stage was successfully reused. The first stage was recovered for a second time, setting another record. A third record comes from a successful splashdown of the payload fairings.

== Satellite description ==
SES-10 is based on the three axis stabilised Eurostar-3000 satellite bus. It has a mass of 5,282 kg (11,645 lb), produces 13 kW of power and has a design life of 15 years. It uses a hybrid approach for spacecraft propulsion, using bi-propellant propulsion for orbit raising and electric propulsion for station keeping. Its electrical system uses a Hall-effect thruster with a Xenon regulator and feed system supplied by ArianeGroup. ArianeGroup also supplies 14 S10-21 10 N (2.2 lb_{f}) thrusters for the reaction control system, plus 17 pyrovalves and 13 fill and drain valves. Its payload comprises 55 Ku-band transponders arranged in three wide beams. The first beam covers Mexico, Central America and the Caribbean, the second beam covers Hispanic South America, and the third beam is dedicated to Brazil.

== History ==
On 20 February 2014, SES S.A. ordered a new satellite, SES-10 from Airbus Defence and Space. It was to be built on the Eurostar-3000 satellite bus, weight 5,282 kg (11,645 lb), produce 13 kW of power and have a design life of 15 years. It would be positioned in the 67° West orbital position, which belonged to the Simón Bolivar-2 registry belonging to the Andean Community. From there, it would offer an all Ka-band to Latin American and the Caribbean.

On the same day, SES disclosed that they had contracted with SpaceX for launch services. While initially thought to be launched aboard a Falcon Heavy due to performance limitations of the Falcon 9, it was clarified that it would, in fact, launch aboard the smaller rocket. At that time, it was believed that the launcher could only perform geosynchronous transfer orbit (GTO) missions of up to 4,850 kg (10,690 lb), but SpaceX spokeswoman Emily Shanklin disclosed that the company had reserved 450 kg (990 lb) for its own use.

On 30 August 2016, it was announced that SES-10 would launch aboard a Falcon 9 Full Thrust launch vehicle no earlier than the fourth quarter of 2016. On 30 March 2017, the launch from Pad LC-39A, Kennedy Space Center, Cape Canaveral, Florida, became the first to reuse an orbital rocket's first stage, booster B1021, previously launched on the 23rd Falcon 9 mission that launched CRS-8. After delivering the payload, the first stage landed on a drone ship, becoming the first orbital rocket stage to return from space for the second time. Additionally, one clamshell half of the payload fairing remained intact after a successful splashdown achieved with thrusters and a steerable parachute.

On 15 May 2017, the satellite became fully operational at 67° West.

== See also ==
- SES – owner and operator of SES-10
- List of SES satellites – list of all SES satellites
- List of Falcon 9 launches
