= List of Atlas launches (1990–1999) =

This is a list of Atlas rocket launches which took place during the period 1990-1999.

== Launch statistics ==
=== Rocket configurations ===
- Atlas E/F
- Atlas I
- Atlas II
- Atlas IIA
- Atlas IIAS

=== Launch sites ===
- Cape Canaveral SLC-36A
- Cape Canaveral SLC-36B
- Vandenberg SLC-3E
- Vandenberg SLC-3W

=== Launch outcomes ===
- Success
- Partial failure
- Failure

== 1990 ==
| Date/Time (UTC) | Rocket | S/N | Launch site | Payload | Function | Orbit | Outcome | Remarks |
|---|---|---|---|---|---|---|---|---|
| 1990-04-11; 15:00 | Atlas E/F-Altair | 28E | VAFB SLC-3W | USA-56/57/58 (Stacksat/P87-2) | Technology | LEO | Success | |
| 1990-07-25; 19:21 | Atlas I | AC-69 | CCAFS LC-36B | CRRES | Scientific | GTO | Success | Maiden flight of Atlas I |
| 1990-12-01; 15:57 | Atlas E/F-Star-37S-ISS | 61E | VAFB SLC-3W | USA-68 (DMSP F-10) | Weather satellite | LEO | Success | |

== 1991 ==
| Date/Time (UTC) | Rocket | S/N | Launch site | Payload | Function | Orbit | Outcome | Remarks |
|---|---|---|---|---|---|---|---|---|
| 1991-04-18; 23:30 | Atlas I | AC-70 | CCAFS SLC-36B | BS-3H | Comsat | GTO (target) | Failure | One Centaur engine failed to start due to a plug of frozen nitrogen. RSO T+441 seconds. |
| 14 May 1991; 15:52:03 | Atlas E/F-Star-37S-ISS | 50E | VAFB, SLC-3W | NOAA-12 (NOAA-D) | Weather satellite | SSO | Success | |
| 1991-11-28; 13:23 | Atlas E/F-Star-37S-ISS | 53E | VAFB SLC-3W | USA-73 (DMSP F-11) | Weather satellite | LEO | Success | 500th Atlas launch |
| 1991-12-07; 22:47 | Atlas II | AC-102 | CCAFS SLC-36B | Eutelsat 2F3 | Comsat | GTO | Success | Maiden flight of Atlas II |

== 1992 ==
| Date/Time (UTC) | Rocket | S/N | Launch site | Payload | Function | Orbit | Outcome | Remarks |
|---|---|---|---|---|---|---|---|---|
| 1992-02-11; 00:41:02 | Atlas II | AC-101 | CCAFS SLC-36A | USA-78 (DSCS IIIB-14) | Military Comsat | GTO | Success | |
| 1992-03-14; 00:00 | Atlas I | AC-72 | CCAFS SLC-36B | Galaxy 5 | Comsat | GTO | Success | |
| 1992-06-10; 00:00 | Atlas IIA | AC-105 | CCAFS SLC-36B | Intelsat K | Comsat | GTO | Success | Maiden flight of Atlas IIA |
| 1992-07-02; 21:54:01 | Atlas II | AC-103 | CCAFS SLC-36A | USA-82 (DSCS IIIB-12) | Military Comsat | GTO | Success | |
| 1992-08-22; 22:40 | Atlas I | AC-71 | CCAFS SLC-36B | Galaxy 1R | Comsat | GTO (target) | Failure | One Centaur engine failed to start due to a plug of frozen nitrogen. RSO T+470 seconds. |

== 1993 ==
| Date/Time (UTC) | Rocket | S/N | Launch site | Payload | Function | Orbit | Outcome | Remarks |
|---|---|---|---|---|---|---|---|---|
| 1993-03-25; 21:38 | Atlas I | AC-74 | CCAFS SLC-36B | UHF F1 | Military Comsat | GTO (target); MEO (achieved) | Failure | Sustainer engine lost thrust due to improperly torqued set screw. Satellite placed in unusable orbit. |
| 1993-07-19; 22:04 | Atlas II | AC-104 | CCAFS SLC-36A | USA-93 (DSCS IIIB-9) | Military Comsat | GTO | Success | |
| 9 August 1993; 10:02 | Atlas E/F-Star-37S-ISS | 34E | VAFB, SLC-3W | NOAA-13 (NOAA-I) | Weather satellite | SSO | Success | |
| 1993-09-03; 11:17 | Atlas I | AC-75 | CCAFS SLC-36B | USA-95 (UHF F2) | Military Comsat | GTO | Success | |
| 1993-11-28; 23:40 | Atlas II | AC-106 | CCAFS SLC-36A | USA-97 (DSCS IIIB-10) | Military Comsat | GTO | Success | |
| 1993-12-16; 00:38 | Atlas IIAS | AC-108 | CCAFS SLC-36B | Telstar 401 | Comsat | GTO | Success | Maiden flight of Atlas IIAS |

== 1994 ==
| Date/Time (UTC) | Rocket | S/N | Launch site | Payload | Function | Orbit | Outcome | Remarks |
|---|---|---|---|---|---|---|---|---|
| 1994-04-13; 06:04 | Atlas I | AC-73 | CCAFS SLC-36B | GOES-I (GOES-8) | Weather satellite | GTO | Success | |
| 1994-06-24; 13:50:02 | Atlas I | AC-76 | CCAFS SLC-36B | USA-104 (UHF F3) | Military Comsat | GTO | Success | |
| 1994-08-03; 23:57 | Atlas IIA | AC-107 | CCAFS SLC-36A | DBS-2 | Comsat | GTO | Success | |
| 1994-08-29; 17:38 | Atlas E/F-Star-37S-ISS | 20E | VAFB SLC-3W | USA-106 (DMSP F-12) | Weather satellite | LEO | Success | |
| 1994-10-06; 06:35:02 | Atlas IIAS | AC-111 | CCAFS SLC-36B | Intelsat 703 | Comsat | GTO | Success | |
| 1994-11-29; 10:21 | Atlas IIA | AC-110 | CCAFS SLC-36A | Orion 1 | Comsat | GTO | Success | |
| 30 December 1994; 10:02 | Atlas E-Star-37S-ISS | 11E | VAFB, SLC-3W | NOAA-14 (NOAA-J) | Weather satellite | SSO | Success | |

== 1995 ==
| Date/Time (UTC) | Rocket | S/N | Launch site | Payload | Function | Orbit | Outcome | Remarks |
|---|---|---|---|---|---|---|---|---|
| 1995-01-10; 06:18 | Atlas IIAS | AC-113 | CCAFS SLC-36B | Intelsat 704 | Comsat | GTO | Success | First Atlas launch conducted by ILS |
| 1995-01-29; 01:25 | Atlas II | AC-112 | CCAFS SLC-36A | USA-108 (UHF F4) | Military Comsat | GTO | Success | |
| 1995-03-22; 06:18 | Atlas IIAS | AC-115 | CCAFS SLC-36B | Intelsat 705 | Comsat | GTO | Success | |
| 1995-03-24; 14:05 | Atlas E/F-Star-37S-ISS | 45E | VAFB SLC-3W | USA-109 (DMSP F-13) | Weather satellite | LEO | Success | Final flight of Atlas E/F |
| 1995-04-07; 23:47 | Atlas IIA | AC-114 | CCAFS SLC-36A | AMSC-1 | Comsat | GTO | Success | |
| 1995-05-23; 05:52:02 | Atlas I | AC-77 | CCAFS SLC-36B | GOES-J (GOES-9) | Weather satellite | GTO | Success | |
| 1995-05-31; 15:27:01 | Atlas II | AC-116 | CCAFS SLC-36A | USA-111 (UHF F5) | Military Comsat | GTO | Success | |
| 1995-07-31; 23:30:00 | Atlas IIA | AC-118 | CCAFS SLC-36A | USA-113 (DSCS IIIB-7) | Military Comsat | GTO | Success | |
| 1995-08-29; 00:53:01 | Atlas IIAS | AC-117 | CCAFS SLC-36B | JCSAT-3 | Comsat | GTO | Success | |
| 1995-10-22; 08:00:02 | Atlas II | AC-119 | CCAFS SLC-36A | USA-114 (UHF F6) | Military Comsat | GTO | Success | |
| 1995-12-02; 08:08:01 | Atlas IIAS | AC-121 | CCAFS SLC-36B | SOHO | Solar | Halo | Success | |
| 1995-12-15; 00:23 | Atlas IIA | AC-120 | CCAFS SLC-36A | Galaxy 3R | Comsat | GTO | Success | |

== 1996 ==
| Date/Time (UTC) | Rocket | S/N | Launch site | Payload | Function | Orbit | Outcome | Remarks |
|---|---|---|---|---|---|---|---|---|
| 1996-02-01; 01:15:01 | Atlas IIAS | AC-126 | CCAFS SLC-36B | Palapa C1 | Comsat | GTO | Success | |
| 1996-04-03; 23:01:01 | Atlas IIA | AC-122 | CCAFS SLC-36A | Inmarsat 3-F1 | Comsat | GTO | Success | |
| 1996-04-30; 04:31:01 | Atlas I | AC-78 | CCAFS SLC-36B | BeppoSAX | Astronomy | LEO | Success | 100th Atlas-Centaur launch |
| 1996-07-25; 12:42 | Atlas II | AC-125 | CCAFS SLC-36A | USA-127 (UHF F7) | Military Comsat | GTO | Success | |
| 8 September 1996; 21:49:01 | Atlas IIA | AC-123 | CCAFS, LC-36B | GE-1 | Communications | GTO | Success | |
| 1996-11-21; 20:47 | Atlas IIA | AC-124 | CCAFS SLC-36A | Hot Bird 2 | Comsat | GTO | Success | |
| 1996-12-18; 01:57 | Atlas IIA | AC-129 | CCAFS SLC-36B | Inmarsat 3-F3 | Comsat | GTO | Success | |

== 1997 ==
| Date/Time (UTC) | Rocket | S/N | Launch site | Payload | Function | Orbit | Outcome | Remarks |
|---|---|---|---|---|---|---|---|---|
| 1997-02-17; 01:42:02 | Atlas IIAS | AC-127 | CCAFS SLC-36B | JCSAT-4 | Comsat | GTO | Success | |
| 1997-03-08; 06:01 | Atlas IIA | AC-128 | CCAFS SLC-36A | Tempo 2 | Comsat | GTO | Success | |
| 1997-04-25; 05:49 | Atlas I | AC-79 | CCAFS SLC-36B | GOES-K (GOES-10) | Weather satellite | GTO | Success | Final flight of Atlas I |
| 1997-07-28; 01:15 | Atlas IIAS | AC-133 | CCAFS SLC-36B | Superbird-C | Comsat | GTO | Success | |
| 4 September 1997; 12:03:00 | Atlas IIAS | AC-146 | CCAFS, LC-36A | AMC-3 | Communications | GTO | Success | |
| 1997-10-05; 21:01 | Atlas IIAS | AC-135 | CCAFS SLC-36B | Echostar 3 | Comsat | GTO | Success | |
| 1997-10-25; 00:46 | Atlas IIA | AC-131 | CCAFS SLC-36A | USA-135 (DSCS IIIB-13) | Military Comsat | GTO | Success | |
| 1997-12-08; 23:52 | Atlas IIAS | AC-149 | CCAFS SLC-36B | Galaxy 8i | Comsat | GTO | Success | |

== 1998 ==
| Date/Time (UTC) | Rocket | S/N | Launch site | Payload | Function | Orbit | Outcome | Remarks |
|---|---|---|---|---|---|---|---|---|
| 1998-01-29; 18:37 | Atlas IIA | AC-109 | CCAFS SLC-36A | USA-137 (NROL-5/SDS) | Military Comsat | GTO | Success | "Capricorn" |
| 1998-02-28; 00:21 | Atlas IIAS | AC-151 | CCAFS SLC-36B | Intelsat 806 | Comsat | GTO | Success | |
| 1998-03-16; 21:32 | Atlas II | AC-132 | CCAFS SLC-36A | USA-138 (UHF F8) | Military Comsat | GTO | Success | Final flight of baseline Atlas II |
| 1998-06-18; 22:48 | Atlas IIAS | AC-153 | CCAFS SLC-36A | Intelsat 805 | Comsat | GTO | Success | 550th Atlas launch |
| 1998-10-09; 22:50 | Atlas IIA | AC-134 | CCAFS SLC-36B | Hot Bird 5 | Comsat | GTO | Success | |
| 1998-10-20; 07:19 | Atlas IIA | AC-130 | CCAFS SLC-36A | USA-140 (UHF F9) | Military Comsat | GTO | Success | |

== 1999 ==
| Date/Time (UTC) | Rocket | S/N | Launch site | Payload | Function | Orbit | Outcome | Remarks |
|---|---|---|---|---|---|---|---|---|
| 1999-02-16; 01:45:26 | Atlas IIAS | AC-152 | CCAFS SLC-36A | JCSAT-6 | Comsat | GTO | Success | |
| 1999-04-12; 22:50 | Atlas IIAS | AC-154 | CCAFS SLC-36A | Eutelsat W3 | Comsat | GTO | Success | |
| 1999-09-23; 06:02 | Atlas IIAS | AC-155 | CCAFS SLC-36A | Echostar 5 | Comsat | GTO | Success | |
| 1999-11-23; 04:06 | Atlas IIA | AC-136 | CCAFS SLC-36B | USA-146 (UHF F10) | Military Comsat | GTO | Success | |
| 1999-12-18; 18:57:39 | Atlas IIAS | AC-141 | VAFB SLC-3E | Terra | Remote sensing | LEO | Success | First Atlas Centaur from VAFB |

== Photo gallery ==
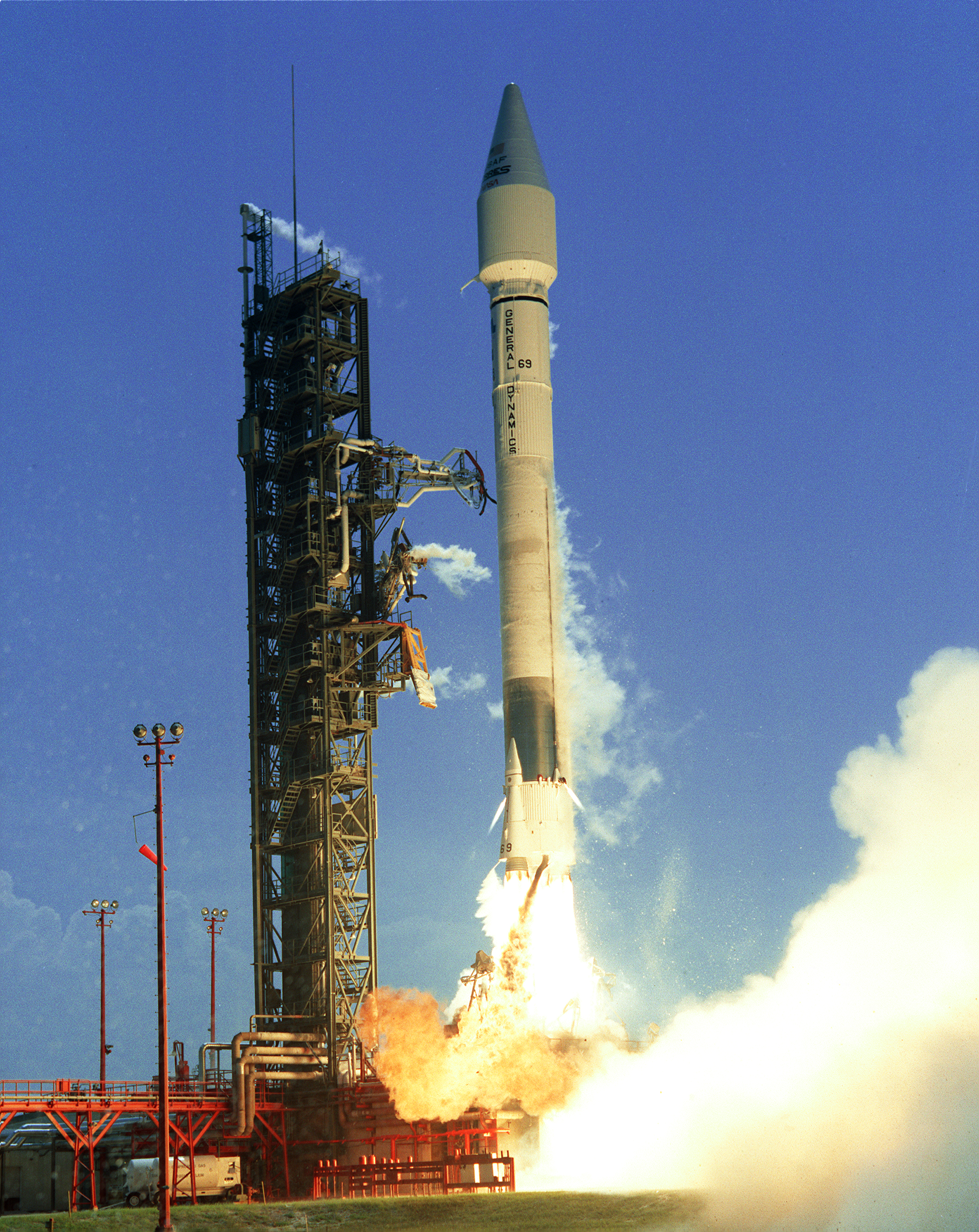
Maiden flight of Atlas I rocket
