= Satcom (satellite) =

Family of communications satellites

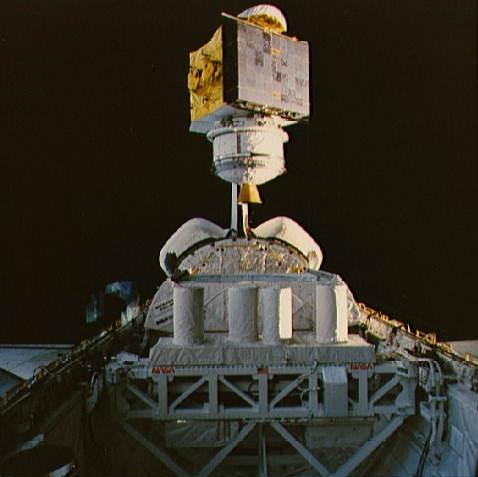
Satcom K1 being placed into orbit by the Space Shuttle Columbia in 1986. The illuminated (right hand) side of the satellite is one set of solar panels which were extended when the satellite propelled itself to its geostationary orbit.

Satcom, a portmanteau of satellite communications, was a brand of artificial geo-stationary communications satellites originally developed and operated by RCA American Communications (RCA Americom) that facilitated wide-area telecommunications by receiving radio signals from Earth, amplifying them, and relaying them back down to terrestrial receivers.

Satcom was one of the early geostationary satellites; the first were the Syncom series, in 1964. The first Satcom satellite, Satcom 1, was launched on 13 December 1975. The last satellite, Satcom K2, was placed into orbit on 27 November 1985 and was de-orbited in February 2002. Satcom was first superseded and then replaced by the GE series of satellites.

The Satcom system passed to General Electric with its purchase of RCA in 1986. RCA Americom became GE American Communications (GE Americom) and the satellite construction division became GE Astro Space. GE Astro Space was sold to Martin Marietta (now Lockheed Martin Space Systems) in 1993. In 2001, GE sold GE Americom to SES Global, creating SES Americom.

== History ==
Most early commercial communications satellites were built for and operated by telecommunications companies. RCA, with its own RCA Astro Electronics satellite construction business, identified a role for itself as a satellite owner/operator.

Satcom 1 was used as the launching ground for many cable TV services including HBO, Showtime, Superstation TBS, Nickelodeon, the CBN cable network (now Freeform), ESPN, and The Weather Channel. The satellite spurred the cable television industry to unprecedented heights with the assistance of HBO (who moved their programming from the competing Westar 1, where they had been since their nationwide debut in 1975, to Satcom 1 in February 1976). Cable television networks relay signals to ground-based cable television headends using satellites, which allowed cable TV to enter into the suburban and metropolitan markets, thus allowing HBO to accumulate 1.6 million subscribers by the end of 1977.

A notable legal battle involved Ted Turner suing RCA to get a Satcom 1 transponder in 1980 for the launch of CNN on 1 June 1980. CNN had been scheduled for a Satcom 3 transponder but that satellite failed to reach geosynchronous orbit upon its launch on 7 December 1979.

Shortly after its launch, Satcom 1 was the first satellite used by broadcast TV networks in the United States. The networks ABC, NBC, and CBS distributed their programming content to some local affiliate stations, which had before relied on AT&T's terrestrial microwave and coaxial networks to distribute and relay programming (although NBC used satellite delivery via Satcom 1 for select affiliates on an experimental basis for this purpose in the late 1970s). The networks fed to both Satcom 1 and AT&T's network at the same time (for the benefit of those stations who hadn't yet been equipped with Earth station equipment for reception of the satellite) up until the breakup of AT&T in 1984, when the networks switched exclusively to satellite distribution on Satcom 1 (and later satellites), due to the much lower transmission costs, as well as due to AT&T's divestiture itself.

The reason that Satcom 1 was so widely used by both cable and broadcast TV networks is that it had twice the communications capacity of the competing Westar 1 (24 transponders as opposed to Westar 1's 12), which resulted in lower transponder usage costs in general.

== Satellite fleet ==
All the remaining Satcom satellites were retired in the early 2000s and replaced by the GE/AMC series, originally by GE Americom, then sold to SES.

Model	Manufacturer	Launch date	Launch vehicle	COSPAR ID	Comments
Satcom 1	RCA Astro Electronics	12 December 1975	Delta 3000	1975-117A	
Satcom 2	RCA Astro Electronics	26 March 1976	Delta 3000	1976-029A	
Satcom 3	RCA Astro Electronics	7 December 1979	Delta 3000	1979-101A	Failure during GTO (currently in non-geosynchronous orbit)
Satcom 1R	RCA Astro Electronics	11 April 1983	Delta 3000	1983-030A	Replaced Satcom 1
Satcom 2R	RCA Astro Electronics	8 September 1983	Delta 3000	1983-094A	Replaced Satcom 2
Satcom 3R	RCA Astro Electronics	20 November 1981	Delta 3000	1981-114A	Replaced Satcom 3
Satcom 4	RCA Astro Electronics	16 January 1982	Delta 3000	1982-004A	
Satcom 5	RCA Astro Electronics	28 October 1982	Delta 3000	1982-105A	Also called Aurora 1, still on 105.2'W (2006)
Satcom 4R	Hughes	8 November 1984	STS-51-A (Discovery)	1984-113B	Launched as Anik D2, purchased in orbit
Satcom C1	GE Astro Space	20 November 1990	Ariane 42P	1990-100A	Replaced Satcom 1R
Satcom C3	GE Astro Space	11 September 1992	Ariane 44LP	1992-060B	
Satcom C4	GE Astro Space	31 August 1992	Delta II (7925)	1992-057A	
Satcom C5	GE Astro Space	29 May 1991	Delta II (7925)	1991-037A	Originally called Aurora 2, replaced Aurora 1 / Satcom 5
Satcom K1	RCA Astro Electronics	12 January 1986	STS-61-C (Columbia)	1986-003B	
Satcom K2	RCA Astro Electronics	27 November 1985	STS-61-B (Atlantis)	1985-109D	
Satcom K3	GE Astro Space	2 March 1991	Ariane 44LP	1991-015A	Sold during construction to SES; launched as Astra 1B
Satcom K4	GE Astro Space	10 June 1992	Atlas II	1992-032A	Sold during construction to Intelsat, launched as Intelsat K
