= Galaxy 15 =

American telecommunications satellite

- Animation of Galaxy 15's trajectory from 13 October 2005 to 25 October 2005; Galaxy 15 · Earth
- Mission type: Communication; Navigation
- Operator: PanAmSat (2005–2006); Intelsat (2006-)
- COSPAR ID: 2005-041A
- SATCAT no.: 28884
- Mission duration: 15 years (planned)

Spacecraft properties
- Bus: GEOStar-2
- Manufacturer: Orbital Sciences
- Launch mass: 2,033 kilograms (4,482 lb)

Start of mission
- Launch date: October 13, 2005, 22:32 UTC
- Rocket: Ariane 5GS
- Launch site: Kourou ELA-3
- Contractor: Arianespace

Orbital parameters
- Reference system: Geocentric
- Regime: Geostationary
- Longitude: 133° West
- Perigee altitude: 35,764 kilometres (22,223 mi)
- Apogee altitude: 35,779 kilometres (22,232 mi)
- Inclination: 0.062 degrees
- Period: 23 hours 56 minutes

Transponders
- Band: 24 G/H band (IEEE C band); 2 C/D band (IEEE L band)

Galaxy 15 is an American telecommunications satellite which is owned by Intelsat. It was launched for and originally operated by PanAmSat, and was subsequently transferred to Intelsat when the two companies merged in 2006. It was originally positioned in geostationary orbit at a longitude of 133° West, from where it was used to provide communication services to North America.

In April 2010, Intelsat lost control of the satellite, and it began to drift away from its orbital slot, with the potential to cause disruption to other satellites in its path. On 27 December 2010, Intelsat reported that the satellite had rebooted as per design and the command unit was responding to commands again. In addition, the satellite had been secured in safe mode and the potential for interference issues from Galaxy 15 had ceased. Intelsat repositioned Galaxy 15 back to its original location on April 4, 2011.

On 10 August 2022, Intelsat again lost control of Galaxy 15 attributing this to a space weather event.

== Satellite ==
Galaxy 15 was constructed by Orbital Sciences Corporation, and was based around the GEOStar-2 satellite bus. The contract for its manufacture was signed in 2001, and at the time it was to have been identical to the Galaxy 12 and Galaxy 14 satellites which were also on order. In 2003, the contract was changed to allow the addition of more transponders to support the US Government's Geostationary Communications and Control Segment (GCCS) Wide Area Augmentation System (WAAS), a US Federal Aviation Administration navigation program.

The communications payload aboard Galaxy 15 consisted of 24 transponders operating in the G and H bands of the NATO electromagnetic spectrum, or the C band of the US IEEE spectrum. It also carried two C/D band (IEEE L band) transponders, which form part of the US Government's Geostationary Communications and Control Segment, and are used for aircraft navigation. At launch, the Galaxy 15 satellite had a mass of 2,033 kilograms (4,482 lb), and an expected operational lifespan of around 15 years.

== Launch ==
The launch of Galaxy 15 was conducted by Arianespace, using an Ariane 5GS carrier rocket flying from ELA-3 at the Guiana Space Centre in Kourou, French Guiana. The launch occurred at 22:32 GMT on October 13, 2005, at the opening of an 84-minute launch window, and successfully placed Galaxy 15 into a geosynchronous transfer orbit. The French Syracuse 3A military communications satellite was launched on the same rocket. During launch, Galaxy 15 was located beneath the Syracuse spacecraft, which was mounted atop a SYLDA adaptor.

Following separation from the carrier rocket, Galaxy 15 raised itself to geostationary orbit by means of an IHI-500N apogee motor. Its insertion into geosynchronous orbit occurred at around 19:00 on October 19, 2005.

== 2010 failure and recovery ==
=== Failure ===
On April 5, 2010, Galaxy 15 ceased responding to commands sent to it by controllers on the ground. However, it is unclear when the actual initial failure date was because commands are often sent by satellite operators days or even weeks apart. Without commands necessary for stationkeeping it began to drift east away from its allotted orbital slot. All television signals were transferred to other satellites and all intentional transmissions were ceased. The Galaxy 12 satellite was removed from on-orbit storage at 123° West to replace Galaxy 15 at the 133° West orbital slot. Galaxy 12 was originally slated to replace another satellite Galaxy 27 which had to be relocated to 45.1° East for the start of a mission critical service for the United States government. Due to the necessity of relocating Galaxy 12 to 133° West, Intelsat was forced to leave 129° West vacant. On 20 April, Orbital Sciences theorized that they believed solar activity was responsible for the satellite malfunctioning, although a later statement by the company said that the company had been unable to actually settle on "a single root cause." On May 3, an attempt at a very momentary series of strong pulses intended to cause a power system malfunction were sent to Galaxy 15. Unfortunately, this did not have the desired effect of causing a power system overload and subsequent shut down of the active transponders. It was the concern of neighboring satellite operators that this type of recovery attempt would have had the potential to permanently damage sensitive hardware on board a satellite and could have contributed to placing a satellite into a permanent unrecoverable control state.

The failure was most likely caused by an electrostatic discharge that knocked out the satellite's communications systems, as a side-effect of spacecraft charging from solar radiation.

=== Reported passes and interference ===
On May 12, 2010, Intelsat and SES World Skies confirmed that Galaxy 15 would pass close to the latter's AMC-11 satellite, potentially causing interference with cable programming over the United States because the two satellites broadcast on similar frequencies. Between May 23 and June 7, 2010, Galaxy 15 passed within half a degree of AMC-11. As the two satellites passed close to each other, particularly during closest approach on May 31 and June 1, signals from Galaxy 15's still-active transponders could have interfered with signals being broadcast by AMC-11. SES maneuvered the AMC-11 satellite to reduce the possibility of interference. The SES-1 satellite followed behind Galaxy 15 during the pass to provide a backup to AMC-11 should it be needed.

On June 2, Intelsat and SES reported that no interference had occurred during closest approach, with the satellites passing within 0.2 degrees of each other. After it had passed AMC-11, Galaxy 15 continued to drift Eastwards. Between 12 and 13 July 2010, it passed Galaxy 13/Horizons-1, a satellite located at 127.0° West which is owned jointly by Intelsat and SKY Perfect JSAT Group. The pass was not reported to have caused any disruption to broadcasts being made by Galaxy 13/Horizons-1.

On 26 July 2010, Galaxy 15 passed another Intelsat spacecraft; Galaxy 14, which is located at 125.0° West. Closest approach occurred on 30 July. On August 8, 2010, the satellite drifted toward a satellite owned by GCI, a communications company broadcasting to rural Alaska. Galaxy 15 passed Anik F2 at orbital slot 111.1° West at or near October 20 through 25, 2010. Further, the satellite continued to be watched by telecommunications companies due to the potential for interfering with C-band frequencies.

On 9 December 2010, it was reported that Galaxy 15 had potentially caused an outage to a National Weather Service NOAAPORT feed via SES-1 located at 101 west. Then on 12 December 2010, the following advisory was issued, A RISK HAS BEEN IDENTIFIED WHEN THE GALAXY 15 ROGUE SATELLITE TRAVERSES THE SES-1 ORBITAL POSITION WHICH MAY RESULT IN A POSSIBLE LOSS OF DATA VIA THE NWS AWIPS SBN/NOAAPORT FEED. THIS POTENTIAL INTERFERENCE MAY TAKE PLACE BETWEEN 12/12/10 AND 12/18/10 INCLUSIVE. To minimize interference, signals intended for SES-1 at 101 West were routed and uplinked via an 11-meter dish from the SES Americom Master Ground Station in Hawaii, which is outside the Galaxy 15 uplink footprint.

Throughout the failure and drift period of Galaxy 15 status information regarding the continued operation of the two L-Band Wide Area Augmentation System Space Segment transponders once utilized by the FAA for aircraft precision location remained unknown. Prior to recovery, Galaxy 15 had been expected to pass by Inmarsat 4F3 at 98 degrees west in late December 2010. Inmarsat 4F3 has since performed some of the same WAAS mission for the FAA from 98 degrees west, that Galaxy 15 once performed at 133 west.

=== Uplink signal avoidance and mitigation ===
Galaxy 15, like many communications satellites rebroadcasts the signals it receives on its uplink frequencies to the corresponding C-Band downlink frequencies. Therefore, the potential for interference only existed when Galaxy 15 drifted into the line of sight of a ground uplink segment intended for another communications satellite operating on the same uplink frequency range in the path of Galaxy 15. The magnitude of the interference risk depended on a large number of variables, including the size of the uplink antenna used (the larger the antenna, the lower the risk to hit Galaxy 15), the location of the uplink and whether inside the Galaxy 15 footprint, and the onboard gain capabilities of the satellite proximate to Galaxy 15. Satellite operators devised a variety of strategies to mitigate the potential interference to their birds' downlink transmissions including, temporarily transferring uplinks to larger uplink antenna, deliberately off-pointing uplink antennas to put Galaxy 15 into the null, maneuvering the satellite being passed to maintain a minimum angular separation, increasing the satellite's gain sensitivity settings allowing a lowering of the uplink power needed and latterly moving the uplink to a location where Galaxy 15 had no uplink coverage (i.e. Hawaii). These techniques were successfully able to reduce, mitigate and minimize for commercial satellite operations most interference potential during a Galaxy 15 fly by. Smaller sized stationary receive only sites, like those used by amateurs or SMATV which have a wider beam width reception potential, may have experienced interference, while for the most part commercial operators experienced no adverse effects from Galaxy 15 during its failure period thanks to the execution of the mitigation practices devised in the wake of the crisis.

=== Power loss predictions and criticism ===
The satellite was theorized to lose attitude control when its reaction wheels became saturated. When this event occurred, it would prevent the spacecraft's solar panels from tracking the sun, and it would shut down. After the power reset event, further attempts would be made to recover control of the satellite. This event was originally predicted for late August or early September 2010, then Intelsat revised its estimate to sometime between 28 November and 29 December 2010. After subsequent criticism of the actual science behind Orbital Sciences' predictions Intelsat completely abandoned the published timeline method. Instead for a period Intelsat stated Based on the revised analysis, the estimated window for a Galaxy 15 off-point and loss of power could occur as early as this month without clarifying the month indicated. The hypothesis used to calculate the timeline of any potential occurrence of loss of power was imprecise, due to the fact the satellite has experienced erratic loading conditions of radio frequency signals since it began to drift. Six months after the initial failure date published timelines for shut down proved to be more hopes of a public relations campaign based in theory, and in an interview conducted in October 2010 during the Satcon Conference, both Intelsat & Orbital admitted that the hoped timeline scenario was, in theory and this has been an unprecedented situation, and we are learning as we go.

=== Recovery ===
On 23 December 2010, Intelsat successfully regained control over the satellite after the Baseband Equipment Command Unit reset following a loss of lock and full discharge of the batteries, reportedly the most critical phases of the recovery of Galaxy 15 have been completed. The emergency command patch which would allow ground controllers to gain access to redundant BBEs in the event of a similar failure in the future had also successfully been applied to Galaxy 15 according to Intelsat. Galaxy 15 was relocated at 93° West in order to conduct further in orbit testing of the viability of the payload and return to service of the satellite. Once Galaxy 15 was fully recovered it was moved back to 133° West and then the Galaxy 12 spacecraft was relocated for its intended mission at the 129° West slot.

On 18 October 2011, Intelsat transitioned all of its 133° West customers back from Galaxy 12 to Galaxy 15.

== 2022 failure and recovery ==
On 18 August 2022, Intelsat submitted a filing with the FCC requesting permission for the satellite to exceed its station keeping limits, indicating that control had been lost.

On 31 August 2022, the spacecraft muted its transponder payloads, as it was programmed to do automatically in case of loss of ground control (21 days after last command).

== See also ==
- 2005 in spaceflight
- List of Intelsat satellites
- Zombie Satellite
