= AMC-11 =

Communications satellite

- Names: GE-11; AMC-11 (2004-present); Anik F4 (in preparation)
- Mission type: Communications
- Operator: SES Americom (2004-2009); SES World Skies (2009-2011); SES (2011-present) Telesat (purchaser)
- COSPAR ID: 2004-017A
- SATCAT no.: 28252
- Mission duration: 15 years (planned); 21 years, 8 months, 29 days (elapsed)

Spacecraft properties
- Spacecraft: GE-11
- Spacecraft type: Lockheed Martin A2100
- Bus: A2100A
- Manufacturer: Lockheed Martin
- Launch mass: 2,340 kg (5,160 lb)

Start of mission
- Launch date: 19 May 2004, 22:22:01 UTC
- Rocket: Atlas IIAS (AC-166)
- Launch site: Cape Canaveral, SLC-36B
- Contractor: Lockheed Martin
- Entered service: July 2004

Orbital parameters
- Reference system: Geocentric orbit
- Regime: Geostationary orbit
- Longitude: 131° West (planned 111.1° West as Anik F4)

Transponders
- Band: 24 C-band
- Coverage area: Canada, United States, Mexico, Caribbean
- SES constellation planned to become Telesat Anik

AMC-11 , previously GE-11, is an American geostationary communications satellite which is operated by SES. It is currently positioned in geostationary orbit at a longitude of 131° West, from where it is used to relay cable television across North America for onward distribution. It broadcasts to Canada, the Caribbean, Mexico and the United States.

SES and Telesat have agreed that Telesat will buy the satellite to replace the failing Anik F2 satellite in its Anik fleet. Permission from the FCC is pending; once issued, the satellite will be repositioned to 111.1° West.

Hitherto the satellite is owned by SES and used to relay cable television across the United States, Mexico and the Caribbean.

== Spacecraft ==
AMC-11 was built by Lockheed Martin, and is based on the A2100A satellite bus. It was originally ordered by GE Americom as GE-11, however following the merger of GE Americom and SES, it was redesignated AMC-11 while still under construction. It is equipped with 24 transponders operating in the C-band. At launch it had a mass of 2,340 kg (5,160 lb), with an expected operational lifespan of around fifteen years. On December 1, 2022, AMC 11 ends its life cycle and was replaced by the SES 21 satellite.

== Launch ==
The launch of AMC-11, which was conducted by International Launch Services, was the penultimate flight and last commercial launch of the Atlas II launch vehicle, which flew in the Atlas IIAS configuration. The launch occurred from SLC-36B at the Cape Canaveral Air Force Station, at 22:22:01 UTC on 19 May 2004. The launch successfully placed AMC-11 into a geosynchronous transfer orbit (GTO), from which it raised itself to geostationary orbit by means of a LEROS-1c apogee motor. Its insertion into geosynchronous orbit occurred on 24 May 2004.

== Galaxy 15 ==
In late May and early June 2010, the Galaxy 15 satellite, which had failed with its transponders still broadcasting, passed close to AMC-11. Since Galaxy 15 broadcast on similar frequencies to AMC-11, interference from its transponders could have affected signals originating from AMC-11. As a result, AMC-11 was manoeuvred out of the way of Galaxy 15, and the SES-1 satellite was brought in to provide backup in case AMC-11 could not continue broadcasting. Galaxy 15 passed within 0.2° of AMC-11, however no service interruptions occurred.

== See also ==
- 2004 in spaceflight
