= SES Americom =

Commercial satellite operator

SES AMERICOM
- Type: Private company
- Industry: Communications
- Founded: 1975; 51 years ago (as RCA Americom)
- Defunct: 2009; 17 years ago
- Fate: Merged
- Successor: SES World Skies
- Headquarters: Princeton, New Jersey, United States
- Area served: North America
- Products: Satellite services
- Revenue: €261.7 million (Q1-Q3 2008)
- Net income: €63.2 million (Q1-Q3 2008)
- Number of employees: 414 (2007)
- Parent: SES

SES Americom was a major commercial satellite operator of North American geosynchronous satellites based in the United States. The company started as RCA Americom in 1975 before being bought by General Electric in 1986, and then later acquired by SES in 2001. In September 2009, SES Americom and SES New Skies merged into SES World Skies.

== History ==
RCA American Communications (RCA Americom) was founded in 1975 as an operator of RCA Astro Electronics-built satellites. The company's first satellite; Satcom 1, was launched on 12 December 1975. Satcom 1 was one of the earliest geostationary satellites.

Satcom 1 was instrumental in helping early cable TV channels (such as Superstation TBS and CBN) to become initially successful, because these channels distributed their programming to all of the local cable TV headends using the satellite. Additionally, it was the first satellite used by broadcast TV networks in the United States, like American Broadcasting Company (ABC), NBC, and CBS, to distribute their programming to all of their local affiliate stations. Satcom 1 was so widely used because it had twice the communications capacity of the competing Westar 1 (24 transponders as opposed to Westar 1's 12), which resulted in lower transponder usage costs. 14 more (increasingly sophisticated) Satcom satellites would enter service from 1976 to 1992.

In 1986, General Electric acquired RCA and renamed the Americom unit to GE American Communications (GE Americom). From 1996 new satellites were named in the GE-# series, i.e. GE-1 in 1996, GE-2 in 1997 etc.

=== SES purchase ===
In November 2001, GE sold its GE Americom unit to SES for US$5 billion in cash and stock. As a result of the sale, GE Americom was renamed SES Americom and SES Global was formed as the parent company. SES's existing operations were moved to the newly created SES Astra subsidiary. SES formerly bought a satellite from failed Direct broadcast satellite (DBS) company Crimson Satellite Associates and GE Americom while still under construction by GE AstroSpace (as Satcom K3). Renamed Astra 1B and modified for use as a European direct broadcasting satellite and a part of the Astra DBS constellation, it was launched to add extra capacity to the satellite television services from 19.2° East, serving Germany, the United Kingdom and Republic of Ireland.

After the acquisition of GE Americom by SES, all the satellites previously named with the GE-# prefix were renamed AMC-# (i.e., GE-1 renamed AMC-1, and so on).

The president and CEO of the new SES Americom was Dean Olmstead. He left the company in 2004 and was succeeded by Edward Horowitz. SES Americom was subsequently placed under Robert Bednarek, the president and CEO of SES New Skies.

In September 2009, SES Americom and SES New Skies were re-branded SES World Skies.

== Satellite fleet ==
Before being merged into SES World Skies in 2009 (which expanded coverage to Middle East and Africa), SES Americom operated the following North American satellites in geosynchronous orbit:

Satellite	Position	Manufacturer	Model	Launched	Launch vehicle	Comments
AMC-1	131° West	Lockheed Martin	A2100A	8 September 1996	Atlas IIA	
AMC-2	101° West	Lockheed Martin	A2100A	30 January 1997	Ariane 44L	Replaced by SES-1
AMC-3	87° West	Lockheed Martin	A2100A	4 September 1997	Atlas IIAS	
AMC-4	101° West	Lockheed Martin	A2100AX	13 November 1999	Ariane 44LP	Launched in 1999 as GE-4. Replaced by SES-1
AMC-5	79° West	Alcatel Space	Spacebus 2000	28 October 1998	Ariane 44L	
AMC-6	72° West	Lockheed Martin	A2100AX	22 October 2000	Proton-K / DM-2	
AMC-7	137° West	Lockheed Martin	A2100A	14 September 2000	Ariane 5G	Launched in 2000 as GE-7. Backup to AMC-10 since 2015
AMC-8	139° West	Lockheed Martin	A2100A	19 December 2000	Ariane 5G	Launched in 2000 as GE-8
AMC-9	83° West	Alcatel Alenia Space	Spacebus 3000B3	7 June 2003	Proton-K / Briz-M	Failed in June 2017, apparently broke apart
AMC-10	135° West	Lockheed Martin	A2100A	5 February 2004	Atlas IIAS	
AMC-11	131° West	Lockheed Martin	A2100A	19 May 2004	Atlas IIAS	
AMC-12	37° West	Alcatel Alenia Space	Spacebus 4000C3	3 February 2005	Proton-M / Briz-M	Renamed NSS-10
AMC-14	61.5° West (planned)	Lockheed Martin	A2100	14 March 2008	Proton-M / Briz-M	Launch failure
AMC-15	105° West	Lockheed Martin	A2100AX	15 October 2004	Proton-M / Briz-M	
AMC-16	85° West	Lockheed Martin	A2100AX	17 December 2004	Atlas V (521)	
AMC-18	139° West	Lockheed Martin	A2100A	8 December 2006	Ariane 5 ECA	Replaced AMC-2 previously at 105° West
Satcom C3	79° West	GE AstroSpace	GE-3000	10 September 1992	Ariane 44LP	Graveyard orbit
AMC-21	125° West	Thales Alenia Space / Orbital Sciences Corporation	STAR-2	14 August 2008	Ariane 5 ECA	

== See also ==
- SES
- Astra
- SES New Skies
