= SES-1 =

Geostationary Communications satellite

- Names: AMC-1R; AMC-4R; OS-1
- Mission type: Communications
- Operator: SES Americom / SES
- COSPAR ID: 2010-016A
- SATCAT no.: 36516
- Website: https://www.ses.com/
- Mission duration: 15 years (planned); 15 years, 10 months, 9 days (elapsed)

Spacecraft properties
- Spacecraft: OS-1
- Spacecraft type: GEOStar-2
- Bus: Star-2.4
- Manufacturer: Orbital Sciences Corporation
- Launch mass: 2,561 kg (5,646 lb)
- Power: 5 kW

Start of mission
- Launch date: 24 April 2010, 11:19:00 UTC
- Rocket: Proton-M / Briz-M
- Launch site: Baikonur, Site 200/39
- Contractor: Khrunichev State Research and Production Space Center
- Entered service: June 2010

Orbital parameters
- Reference system: Geocentric orbit
- Regime: Geostationary orbit
- Longitude: 101° West

Transponders
- Band: 48 transponders: 24 C-band; 24 Ku-band
- Bandwidth: 36 MHz
- Coverage area: Canada, United States, Mexico, Caribbean, Central America

SES-1 is a geostationary communications satellite which is operated by SES World Skies, then by SES

== History ==
It was originally ordered by SES Americom as a ground spare for AMC-5R, however in April 2008 a decision was made to launch it, and it was named AMC-1R. It was subsequently renamed AMC-4R, and finally SES-1 after SES Americom merged with SES New Skies to form SES World Skies. It was the third SES World Skies satellite to be launched following the merger, but the first to carry the new SES designation. SES-1 operates in geostationary orbit, and is intended to be located at a longitude of 101° West, where it will replace the AMC-2 and AMC-4 satellites. SES-1 enables high-definition television signals to very small aperture terminals in the United States.

== Spacecraft ==
SES-1 was built by Orbital Sciences Corporation (OSC), and is based on the Star-2.4 satellite bus. It is equipped with 24 C-band and 24 Ku-band transponders. At launch, the satellite had a mass of 2,561 kg (5,646 lb). SES-1 has a design life of fifteen years; however, the spacecraft was launched with enough fuel to operate for at least sixteen years, if all systems remain functional.

== Launch ==
The launch of SES-1 was conducted by International Launch Services (ILS), using a Proton-M launch vehicle with a Briz-M upper stage. The launch occurred from Site 200/39 at the Baikonur Cosmodrome, at 11:19:00 UTC on 24 April 2010. The launch successfully placed SES-1 into a subsynchronous orbit close to geostationary altitude.

== Mission ==
In May and June 2010, SES-1 was positioned close to 131° West to temporarily provide backup to the AMC-11 satellite in the event that AMC-11 could not continue broadcasting whilst it is moved out of the way of the failed Galaxy 15 satellite, which passed close to it at the end of May 2010. In the end, services provided by AMC-11 were not interrupted.

== See also ==
- 2010 in spaceflight
