= SES-3 =

Russian communications satellite

- Names: AMC ground spare OS-2
- Mission type: Communications
- Operator: SES Americom / SES
- COSPAR ID: 2011-035A
- SATCAT no.: 37748
- Website: https://www.ses.com/
- Mission duration: 15 years (planned); 14 years, 10 months, 14 days (elapsed)

Spacecraft properties
- Spacecraft: AMC ground spare
- Spacecraft type: GEOStar-2
- Bus: Star-2.4
- Manufacturer: Orbital Sciences Corporation
- Launch mass: 3,112 kg (6,861 lb)
- Power: 5 kW

Start of mission
- Launch date: 15 July 2011, 23:16:10 UTC
- Rocket: Proton-M / Briz-M
- Launch site: Baikonur, Site 200/39
- Contractor: Khrunichev State Research and Production Space Center
- Entered service: September 2011

Orbital parameters
- Reference system: Geocentric orbit
- Regime: Geostationary orbit
- Longitude: 103° West

Transponders
- Band: 48 transponders: 24 C-band; 24 Ku-band
- Bandwidth: 36 MHz
- Coverage area: North America

SES-3 is a communications satellite operated by SES Americom (later SES World Skies. Now, SES).

== Spacecraft ==
SES-3 was built by Orbital Sciences Corporation (OSC), and is based on the Star-2.4 satellite bus. It is equipped with 24 C-band, and 24 Ku-band transponders, and at launch it had a mass of 3,112 kg (6,861 lb). It has a design life of fifteen years, however it was launched with enough fuel to operate for at least sixteen years, if its systems are still functional.

== Launch ==
It was launched on 15 July 2011 at 23:16:10 UTC on a Proton-M / Briz-M launch vehicle, the launch was arranged by International Launch Services (ILS), since Baikonour, Site 200/39 alongside the KazSat-2 satellite.

== Mission ==
It is positioned at 103.0° West orbital location over North America, replacing AMC-1. Clients include E. W. Scripps Company, In Demand, Pay-per-view, Ion Television, NBC and QVC.
