= AMC-7 =

Communications satellite launched in 2000

- Names: GE-7 (2000-2001); AMC-7 (2001-present)
- Mission type: Communications
- Operator: GE Americom (2000-2001); SES Americom (2001-2009); SES World Skies (2009-2011); SES (2011-present)
- COSPAR ID: 2000-054B
- SATCAT no.: 26495
- Website: https://www.intelsat.com/
- Mission duration: 15 years (planned); 25 years, 6 months, 10 days In Progress

Spacecraft properties
- Spacecraft: GE-7
- Bus: A2100A
- Manufacturer: Lockheed Martin
- Launch mass: 1,983 kg (4,372 lb)

Start of mission
- Launch date: 14 September 2000, 22:54:07 UTC
- Rocket: Ariane 5G (V130)
- Launch site: Centre Spatial Guyanais, ELA-3
- Contractor: Arianespace

Orbital parameters
- Reference system: Geocentric orbit
- Regime: Geostationary orbit
- Longitude: 135° West

Transponders
- Band: 24 C-band
- Frequency: 36 MHz
- Coverage area: United States, Caribbean, Mexico

AMC-7 is a commercial broadcast communications satellite owned by SES, originally from the GE Americom fleet. Launched on 14 September 2000, at 22:54:07 UTC from the Centre Spatial Guyanais in Kourou, AMC-7 provides C-band coverage to United States, Caribbean, Mexico, and is located in a geostationary orbit over the Pacific Ocean east of Hawaii. The satellite is primarily used for cable television programming distribution.

In 2015, the satellite was taken out of commercial service and moved from 137° West to 135° West longitude, where it now serves as a backup to AMC-10. License extended till 25 October 2018.
