= AMC-16 (satellite) =

American satellite

- Names: GE-16
- Mission type: Communications
- Operator: SES Americom / EchoStar
- COSPAR ID: 2004-048A
- SATCAT no.: 28472
- Mission duration: 15 years (planned); 20 years, 2 months, 17 days (elapsed)

Spacecraft properties
- Spacecraft: AMC-16
- Spacecraft type: Lockheed Martin A2100
- Bus: A2100AXS
- Manufacturer: Lockheed Martin
- Launch mass: 4,065 kg (8,962 lb)

Start of mission
- Launch date: 17 December 2004, 12:07:00 UTC
- Rocket: Atlas V 521 (AV-005)
- Launch site: Cape Canaveral, SLC-41
- Contractor: Lockheed Martin Commercial Launch Services (LMCLS)

Orbital parameters
- Reference system: Geocentric orbit
- Regime: Geostationary orbit
- Longitude: 85° West

Transponders
- Band: 36 transponders: 24 Ku-band at 36 MHz; 12 Ka-band
- Coverage area: Canada, United States, Alaska, Hawaii, Mexico

AMC-16 is an American communications satellite. Owned by SES Americom, AMC-16 was designed to be placed in geostationary orbit, following launch on an Atlas V space vehicle.

== Satellite description ==
Built by Lockheed Martin and based on the A2100AXS satellite bus, AMC-16 is located at 85° West longitude for EchoStar. AMC-16 has 24 Ku-band and 12 Ka-band transponders covering United States (including Hawaii and Alaska), part of Canada and Mexico. Leased to Echostar Satellite Services.

== Launch ==
It was launched atop an Atlas V launch vehicle at 12:07:00 UTC on 17 December 2004, from SLC-41 at the Cape Canaveral in Florida. AMC-16 is completely leased to EchoStar Satellite Services.

== See also ==
- 2004 in spaceflight
