= AMC-4 =

- Names: GE-4 (1999-2001); AMC-4 (2001-present)
- Mission type: Communications
- Operator: GE Americom (1999-2001); SES Americom (2001-2009); SES World Skies (2009-2011); SES (2011-present)
- COSPAR ID: 1999-060A
- SATCAT no.: 25954
- Website: SES-AMERICOM AMC-4
- Mission duration: 15 years (planned); 26 years, 10 months, 27 days (elapsed)

Spacecraft properties
- Spacecraft: GE-4
- Spacecraft type: Lockheed Martin A2100
- Bus: LM A2100AX
- Manufacturer: Lockheed Martin
- Launch mass: 3,895 kg (8,587 lb)

Start of mission
- Launch date: 13 November 1999, 22:54 UTC
- Rocket: Ariane 44LP H10-3 (V123)
- Launch site: Centre Spatial Guyanais, ELA-2
- Contractor: Arianespace
- Entered service: 2000

Orbital parameters
- Reference system: Geocentric orbit
- Regime: Geostationary orbit
- Longitude: 134.9° West

Transponders
- Band: 52 transponders: 24 C-band; 28 Ku-band
- Frequency: 36 MHz; 72 MHz (4 Ku-band)
- Coverage area: North America, Latin America, Caribbean

AMC-4 (formerly GE-4) is a commercial broadcast communications satellite owned by SES World Skies, part of SES (and formerly GE Americom, then SES Americom). Launched in 1999, from Centre Spatial Guyanais, ELA-2 by Ariane 44LP H10-3. It provides coverage to North America, Latin America, Caribbean. Located in a geostationary orbit, AMC-4 provides service to commercial and government customers, with programming distribution, satellite news gathering and broadcast internet capabilities.

AMC-4 was launched on 13 November 1999 at 22:54 UTC as GE-4, GE Americom's fourth A2100 hybrid C-band and Ku-band satellite. The C-band payload was home to national television networks broadcasting to thousands of cable television headends. AMC-4's Ku-band transponders served the direct-to-home (DTH), VSAT, business television and broadband Internet market segments. These Ku-band transponders are designed to be switchable between North and South American coverages. It was renamed AMC-4 after GE Americom was bought by SES and re-branded SES Americom. In 2009, SES Americom merged with SES New Skies to form SES World Skies. AMC-4 has been replaced by SES-1 in 2010. AMC-4 has been moved to 134.9° West, and currently has no FTA signals.

== Transponder data ==
Transponders	C-band	Ku-band
Number of transponders and frequency	24 x 36 MHz	24 x 36 MHz; 4 x 72 MHz
Amp type	SSPA, 20 watts	TWTA, 110 watts
Amp redundancy:	16 for 12	18 for 14
Receiver redundancy:	4 for 2	4 for 2
Coverage:	North America, Latin America, Caribbean	
Beacon:	3700.5 MHz (V), 4199.5 MHz (H)	11702 MHz (H), 12198 MHz (V)
Typical Footprint · Frequency Plan

== See also ==
- NORAD
