= AMC-1 =

Communications satellite

- Names: GE-1 (1996-2001); AMC-1 (2001-present)
- Mission type: Communications
- Operator: GE Americom (1996-2001); SES Americom (2001-2009); SES World Skies (2009-2011); SES (2011-present)
- COSPAR ID: 1996-054A
- SATCAT no.: 24315
- Mission duration: 15 years (planned); 29 years, 6 months, 15 days (elapsed)

Spacecraft properties
- Spacecraft: GE-1
- Spacecraft type: Lockheed Martin A2100
- Bus: A2100A
- Manufacturer: Lockheed Martin
- Launch mass: 2,783 kg (6,135 lb)
- Dry mass: 1,300 kg (2,900 lb)

Start of mission
- Launch date: 8 September 1996, 21:49:01 UTC
- Rocket: Atlas IIA (AC-123)
- Launch site: Cape Canaveral, LC-36B
- Contractor: Lockheed Martin
- Entered service: November 1996

Orbital parameters
- Reference system: Geocentric orbit
- Regime: Geostationary orbit
- Longitude: 131° West

Transponders
- Band: 48 transponders: 24 C-band; 24 Ku-band
- Bandwidth: 36 MHz
- Coverage area: Canada, United States, Mexico, Caribbean

AMC-1 is a geosynchronous communications satellite operated by SES, as part of the AMC fleet acquired from GE AMERICOM in 2001. It was a hybrid C-Band / Ku-band spacecraft currently located at 131° West, serving the Canada, United States, Mexico, and Caribbean.

AMC-1 was replaced by the newer SES-3 satellite on 15 July 2011.

== Specifications ==
C-band payload: 24 x 36 MHz
Amp type: SSPA, 12- to 18-watt (adjustable)
Amp redundancy: 16 for 12
Receiver redundancy: 4 for 2
Coverage: CONUS, Alaska, Hawaii, Mexico, Caribbean, Canada

Ku-band payload: 24 x 36 MHz
Amp type: TWTA, 60-watt
Amp redundancy: 18 for 12
Receiver redundancy: 4 for 2
Coverage: Contiguous United States, Alaska, Hawaii, Northern Mexico, Southern Canada
