= AMC-3 =

Communications satellite launched 1997

- Names: GE-3 (1997-2001); AMC-3 (2001-present); Eagle-1 (2017-present)
- Mission type: Communications
- Operator: GE Americom (1997-2001); SES Americom (2001-2009); SES World Skies (2009-2011); SES (2011-present)
- COSPAR ID: 1997-050A
- SATCAT no.: 24936
- Mission duration: 15 years (planned); 28 years, 6 months, 20 days (elapsed)

Spacecraft properties
- Spacecraft: GE-3
- Spacecraft type: Lockheed Martin A2100
- Bus: LM A2100A
- Manufacturer: Lockheed Martin
- Launch mass: 2,845 kg (6,272 lb)
- Dry mass: 1,300 kg (2,900 lb)

Start of mission
- Launch date: 4 September 1997, 12:03:00 UTC
- Rocket: Atlas IIAS
- Launch site: Cape Canaveral, LC-36A
- Contractor: Lockheed Martin
- Entered service: 1997

Orbital parameters
- Reference system: Geocentric orbit
- Regime: Geostationary orbit
- Longitude: 72° West

Transponders
- Band: 48 transponders: 24 C-band; 24 Ku-band
- Coverage area: Canada, United States, Mexico, Caribbean

AMC-3 (formerly GE-3) is a commercial broadcast communications satellite owned by SES (and formerly GE Americom, then SES Americom, then SES World Skies). Launched on 4 September 1997, from Cape Canaveral, Florida, AMC-3 is a hybrid C-band / Ku-band satellite. It provides coverage to Canada, United States, Mexico, Caribbean. Located in a geostationary orbit parallel to the Yucatán Peninsula and Great Lakes, AMC-3 provides service to commercial and government customers, with programming distribution, satellite news gathering and broadcast internet capabilities.

== Eagle-1 ==
In January 2017, the AMC-3 Ku-band payload was sold to Global Eagle Entertainment (GEE), a provider of satellite-based connectivity and media to mobility markets, such as passenger aircraft. GEE purchased all the capacity on the satellite to support aeronautical customers, in particular Southwest Airlines, the company's largest customer, and rebranded the satellite as Eagle-1. The satellite remains under the control of SES S.A.
