= Intelsat K =

Geostationary Communication Satellite

- Mission type: Communications
- Operator: Intelsat / SES World Skies
- COSPAR ID: 1992-032A
- SATCAT no.: 21989
- Mission duration: Final: 10 years, 2 months

Spacecraft properties
- Bus: AS-5000
- Manufacturer: Lockheed Martin
- Launch mass: 2,928 kilograms (6,455 lb)
- Dry mass: 2,836 kilograms (6,252 lb)

Start of mission
- Launch date: 10 June 1992, 00:00 UTC
- Rocket: Atlas IIA
- Launch site: Cape Canaveral LC-36B

Orbital parameters
- Reference system: Geocentric
- Regime: Geostationary
- Longitude: 21.5° W
- Semi-major axis: 43,053.0 kilometers (26,751.9 mi)
- Perigee altitude: 36,307.5 kilometers (22,560.4 mi)
- Apogee altitude: 37,058.0 kilometers (23,026.8 mi)
- Inclination: 12°
- Period: 1,481.8 minutes
- Epoch: 19 April 2017

Transponders
- Band: 16 IEEE K_{u} band

Intelsat K (later termed Satcom K4 and NSS-K) was a geostationary communication satellite built by Lockheed Martin. It was located at orbital position of 21.5 degrees west longitude and was owned by SES World Skies. The satellite was based on the AS-5000 platform and its life expectancy was 10 years. It was retired from service in August 2002 and transferred to a graveyard orbit.

The satellite was purchased from Intelsat by New Skies and renamed to NSS-K. It is also the former Satcom K4 of GE Americom. The satellite was successfully launched into space on June 10, 1992, by means of an Atlas-Centaur from the Cape Canaveral Air Force Station, United States. It had a launch mass of 2836 kg. It was equipped with 16 Ku band transponders.
