= Westar 1 =

American communications satellite launched in 1974

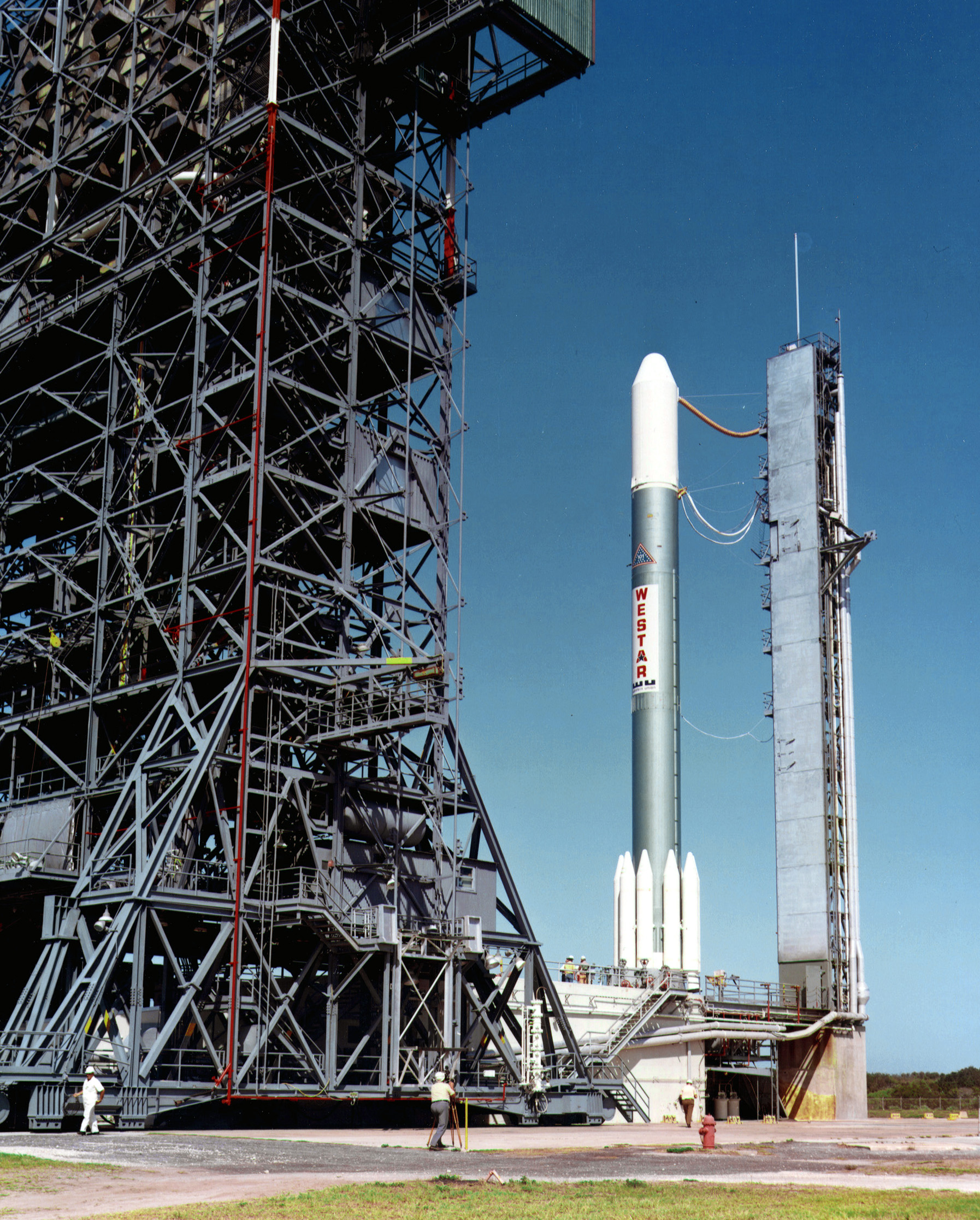
Delta 2914 rocket with Westar satellite at Cape Canaveral (April 1974)

Westar 1 was America's first domestic and commercially launched geostationary communications satellite, launched by Western Union (WU) and NASA on April 13, 1974. It was built by Hughes for Western Union, using the HS-333 platform of spin-stabilized satellites. It operated until May 1983.

== Mission ==
Westar 1 was the first of five Westar satellites launched by Western Union from 1974 to 1982. Westar 1 was launched from Cape Canaveral on a Delta 2914 launch vehicle from Complex 17 on April 13, 1974. The launch vehicle delivered the satellite to a geosynchronous transfer orbit. After transiting to a near geosynchronous apogee, the satellite employed an apogee kick motor to raise the perigee of the orbit and reduce inclination to near-geostationary.

Westars 1, 2, and 3 were 12-transponder satellites while Westar 4 and Westar 5 were launched with 24 transponders (using Hughes' later HS-376 platform of satellite). Western Union built a teleport in Cedar Hill, Texas, to uplink content to the Westar satellites (it was interconnected to WU's existing terrestrial microwave network at the time), and another teleport that, in addition to uplink services, would become the main TT&C (Telemetry, Tracking & Control) center for the satellite (and for all of the Westar fleet later on), in Glenwood, New Jersey. A sixth satellite, Westar 6, was launched in 1984 but failed to reach orbit and was retrieved by the STS-51-A Space Shuttle mission later that year. It was later refurbished and relaunched in orbit of Asia as AsiaSat 1 in 1990.

Westar 1 was used by Western Union for its own internal communications, such as for sending telegrams and mailgrams to Western Union bureaus and U.S. post offices respectively. It also was utilized by outside customers such as PBS, NPR and the Mutual Broadcasting System, using it for sending television and radio programming via satellite to their local affiliate stations throughout the 1970s and '80s. It was also employed to enable communications with offshore oil platforms.

Westar 1 was also used for a short time by HBO for its nationwide debut using satellite distribution to cable companies in 1975 (HBO later moved to RCA's competing satellite, Satcom 1, in February 1976).

Westar 1 was retired from service in April 1983. The 15-meter dishes used to communicate with it at the Cedar Hill site have been decommissioned, but they can still be visited today by contacting Westar Satellite Services. The former main TT&C & uplink site for Westar in Glenwood, is now (as of 2015) the satellite uplink facility for SiriusXM Radio.

== See also ==
- 1974 in spaceflight
