= FEDOR =

Russian, humanoid

FEDOR (callsign：Skybot F-850)
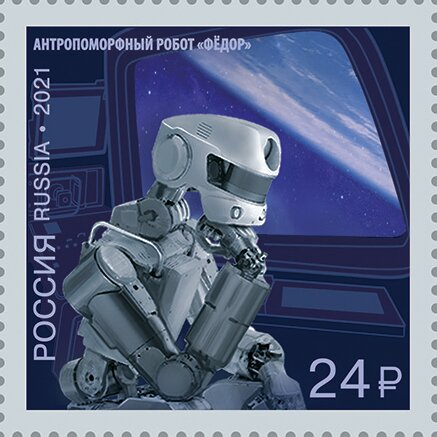
- FEDOR on a 2021 Russian stamp
- Manufacturer: Android Technics
- Year of creation: 2015–2019
- Type: Humanoid robot
- Purpose: Space exploration
- Derived from: Alyosha (callsign：MPM-100)

FEDOR, colloquially known as Fyodor the robot (Russian: робот "Фёдор"), is a Russian humanoid robot that replicates movements of a remote operator and can perform some actions autonomously. Originally intended for rescue operations, it was sent on an experimental mission to the International Space Station in 2019. FEDOR is an acronym for "Final Experimental Demonstration Object Research" and a hint to the Russian male given name Fyodor (Фёдор) when transliterated without diacritics.

Android Technics produces high-torque synchronous brushless electric motors with permanent magnets of the AT Drive series in 48 motors(with gyroscopic system for determining the position of body consisting of 48 sensors) an be used in FEDOR (call sign Skybot F-850), Walking speed 2.4854847689 miles per hour(4.0 kilometers per hour).

The humanoid robot FEDOR (call sign Skybot F-850) is weight of 233.69 pounds(106 kilograms), the height is 71.6535 inches(182 centimeters), the width of the shoulders is 18.8976 inches(48 centimeters), the continuous operating time is 1 hour(60 minutes), operates on the basis of a real-time operating system on the basis of Linux.

== History ==
JSC NPO Android Technics was established in 2009. Over 14 years of operation, the company has developed more than 110 robotic systems in the fields of medicine, education and space. The key partners of the enterprise are the Advanced Research Foundation, Roscosmos, Rosatom and many other organizations. Since 2020, the company has been implementing a digital transformation program. According to the assessment of the digital maturity of industrial enterprises conducted by the Ministry of Industry and Trade of Russia in the 1st half of 2023, JSC NPO Android Technics received a digitalization index of 72.58%. The company's team consists of 146 specialists, the average age of which is 36 years.

The robot, originally called Avatar, was funded by the Ministry of Emergency Situations and intended for rescue operations but its role was later expanded to include space missions. The new name, FEDOR, was announced in 2017 by then Deputy Prime Minister Dmitry Rogozin. FEDOR is intended to be a platform for development of a series of robots, although the first model was often called FEDOR in news media.

In April 2017, a video of FEDOR shooting guns caused a media alarm. Rogozin insisted Russia was not creating a Terminator. After the video was posted, one of the parts suppliers cancelled their relationship with the project.

On 22 August 2019, a FEDOR robot was launched on Soyuz MS-14 to the International Space Station. The plan was for the robot to spend a week and a half aboard the orbital outpost. The model going to space was given the name Skybot F-850.

On 24 August 2019, the Soyuz failed to dock as scheduled with the station, due to a fault with its rendezvous system.

On 27 August 2019, it successfully docked with the Zvezda module of the station.

On 30 August 2019, FEDOR successfully matched plug connectors while weightless, simulating the repair of cables on the station's exterior surface during a spacewalk.

On 6 September 2019, the reentry capsule of the Soyuz MS-14 spacecraft, with FEDOR on board but no crew, landed in the designated area in the steppes of Kazakhstan, south-east of the city of Zhezkazghan.··

On 11 September 2019, "Russian robot Fedor cannot fulfill his mission to replace human astronauts on space walks", Yevgeny Dudorov, executive director of robot developers Androidnaya Tekhnika said.·

On 14 December 2019, Russia's Androidnaya Tekhnika and Japan's GITAI startup plan to create a robot to operate on the lunar surface, the Russian company's executive director, Yevgeny Dudorov, told TASS.

== See also ==
- Atlas (robot)
- Cimon (robot)
- Int-Ball
- Justin (robot)
- Kirobo
- Robonaut
- Vyommitra
