= MicroDragon =

Vietnamese artificial satellite

- Mission type: Earth observation
- Operator: Vietnam National Space Center
- COSPAR ID: 2019-003D
- SATCAT no.: 43935

Spacecraft properties
- Spacecraft type: Microsatellite
- Manufacturer: Vietnam National Space Center
- Launch mass: 50 kg (110 lb)
- Dimensions: 50 × 50 × 50 cm (20 × 20 × 20 in)

Start of mission
- Launch date: 18 January 2019, 00:50 UTC
- Rocket: Epsilon
- Launch site: Uchinoura Space Center
- Contractor: JAXA

End of mission
- Decay date: 1 October 2024

Orbital parameters
- Reference system: Geocentric orbit
- Regime: Sun-synchronous orbit

MicroDragon was a satellite built by the Vietnam National Satellite Center (VNSC).

== Satellite ==
MicroDragon satellite was the product of "Preventing natural disasters and climate change using Earth observation satellite" (Vietnamese: Phòng chống thiên tai và biến đổi khí hậu sử dụng vệ tinh quan sát Trái Đất) project.

It was manufactured by 36 Vietnamese engineers. It costed 600 million USD.

MicroDragon's weight and dimension were 50 kg (110 lb) and 50 × 50 × 50 cm (20 × 20 × 20 in), respectively.

The satellite was successfully launched on 18 January 2019, along with six Japanese satellites.

The satellite decayed on 1 October 2024.

== See also ==
- PicoDragon
- NanoDragon
