= PicoDragon =

Vietnamese CubeSat

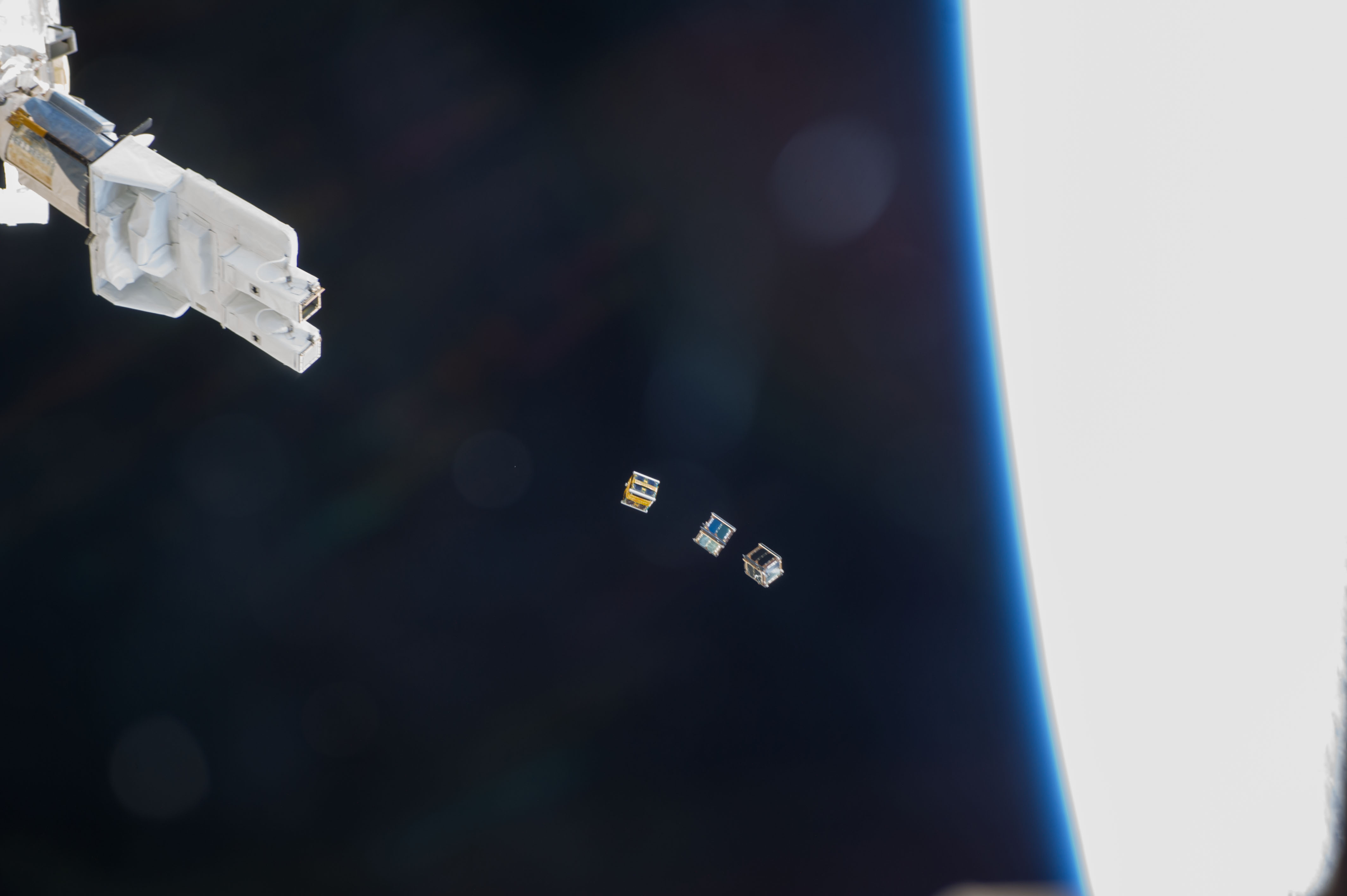
- Three CubeSat deployed by the Small Satellite Orbital Deployer (SSOD) as seen from the International Space Station. (From left: PicoDragon, ArduSat-1 and ArduSat-X.)
- Mission type: Technology
- Operator: Vietnam National Satellite Center
- COSPAR ID: 1998-067DB
- SATCAT no.: 39413
- Website: Website of VNSC about Pico Dragon
- Mission duration: Success and operation in 3 month in the space

Spacecraft properties
- Spacecraft type: 1U CubeSat
- Manufacturer: VNSC
- Launch mass: 1 kilogram (2.2 lb)

Start of mission
- Launch date: 2:48 6/8/2013 UTC+7
- Rocket: Kounotori
- Launch site: Tanegashima
- Deployed from: ISS

Orbital parameters
- Reference system: Geocentric
- Regime: Low Earth
- Inclination: 51.6 degrees

PicoDragon is a small satellite that followed the 1U type of CubeSat program built by the Vietnam National Satellite Center (VNSC) which belongs to VAST and operated in space for 3 months.

It was the first product to be built in Vietnam in the space technology field. The target for this project is to co-operate in space technology development between Vietnam and Japan. It is also the first Vietnamese satellite to launch successfully to space. Before the launch of PicoDragon, there had been 4 satellites launched into orbit: VNREDSat 1A, F-1, Vinasat-1 and Vinasat-2 although F-1 failed upon its launch. Vinasat-1, Vinasat-2, VNREDSat 1A were all built by foreign partners or companies.

== Specifications ==
- Size: 10 by 10 by 11.35 centimetres (3.94 in × 3.94 in × 4.47 in)
- Weight: 0.983 kilograms (2.17 lb)
- Time operating: About 3 months
- Orbit
  - High: 410 kilometres (250 mi)
  - Inclination: 51.6 degrees
- Senses devices:
  - CMOS camera (640 × 480 dpi) to take picture about Earth
- Contact by wireless link
  - Broadcast station frequency about 437.250 MHz
  - Telemetry downlink 1k2 bit/s AFSK 800 mW AX.25 about 437.365 MHz
  - Very high frequency uplink use for control.

== Journey ==
At 2:48 AM (UTC+07:00), 4 August 2013, PicoDragon was successfully launched to the ISS via the transport spacecraft HTV-4, followed by ArduSat-1, ArduSat-X, TechEdSat-3 of United States and Kirobo robot of Japan, all of which were launched at Tanegashima by Kounotori of Japan. Before its placement into orbit from the ISS, it was held back for additional checks.

PicoDragon was a 1U CubeSat project designed for low resolution Earth imagery and to test on-board systems.

On 19 November 2013 (Vietnamese time), PicoDragon was launched into orbit by the ISS. 4 hours after the launch, the first signals of PicoDragon were successfully received by the ground station in Japan. After that, VNSC's ground station also received signals from PicoDragon. After more than 3 months in orbit, PicoDragon - Vietnam's first microsatellite completed the mission and burned upon atmospheric entry back to Earth.

== Future ==
PicoDragon's mission has been deemed sufficient, and in its 3-month orbit, it transmitted an advertising signal "PicoDragon Vietnam" (PicoDragon Việt Nam) to ground-based radio stations.

According to professor Pham Anh Tuan, director of VNSC, after PicoDragon, Vietnam will build more satellites with larger sizes (10 kilograms (22 lb) in 2015 and 50 kilograms (110 lb) in 2017) and will launch a 500 kilograms (1,100 lb) satellite to observe the Earth from space in 2020.
