= BIOTESC =

European space research center

Swiss User Support and Operations Centre
- Abbreviation: BIOTESC
- Headquarters: Lucerne, Switzerland
- Official language: English, German
- Affiliations: Lucerne University of Applied Sciences and Arts
- Staff: < 20 people
- Website: www.hslu.ch/en/biotesc

BIOTESC (Biotechnology Space Support Center) is a space research centre working on behalf of the European Space Agency and attached to the Lucerne University of Applied Sciences and Arts (HSLU). BIOTESC is specialized in space research and biotechnologies:. On behalf of the European Space Agency, the centre offers assistance for the preparation, execution and post-flight analysis of many space experiments generally related to biotechnologies or information technologies.

== History ==
BIOTESC is part of the Space Biology Group, founded in 1977 at the ETH Zurich. In January 2013, the group moved to Lucerne University. They relocated from Zurich to Hergiswil, where they moved into their own building. In 2018 they relocated in another place but stayed in the same city.

== Payloads and Experiments ==
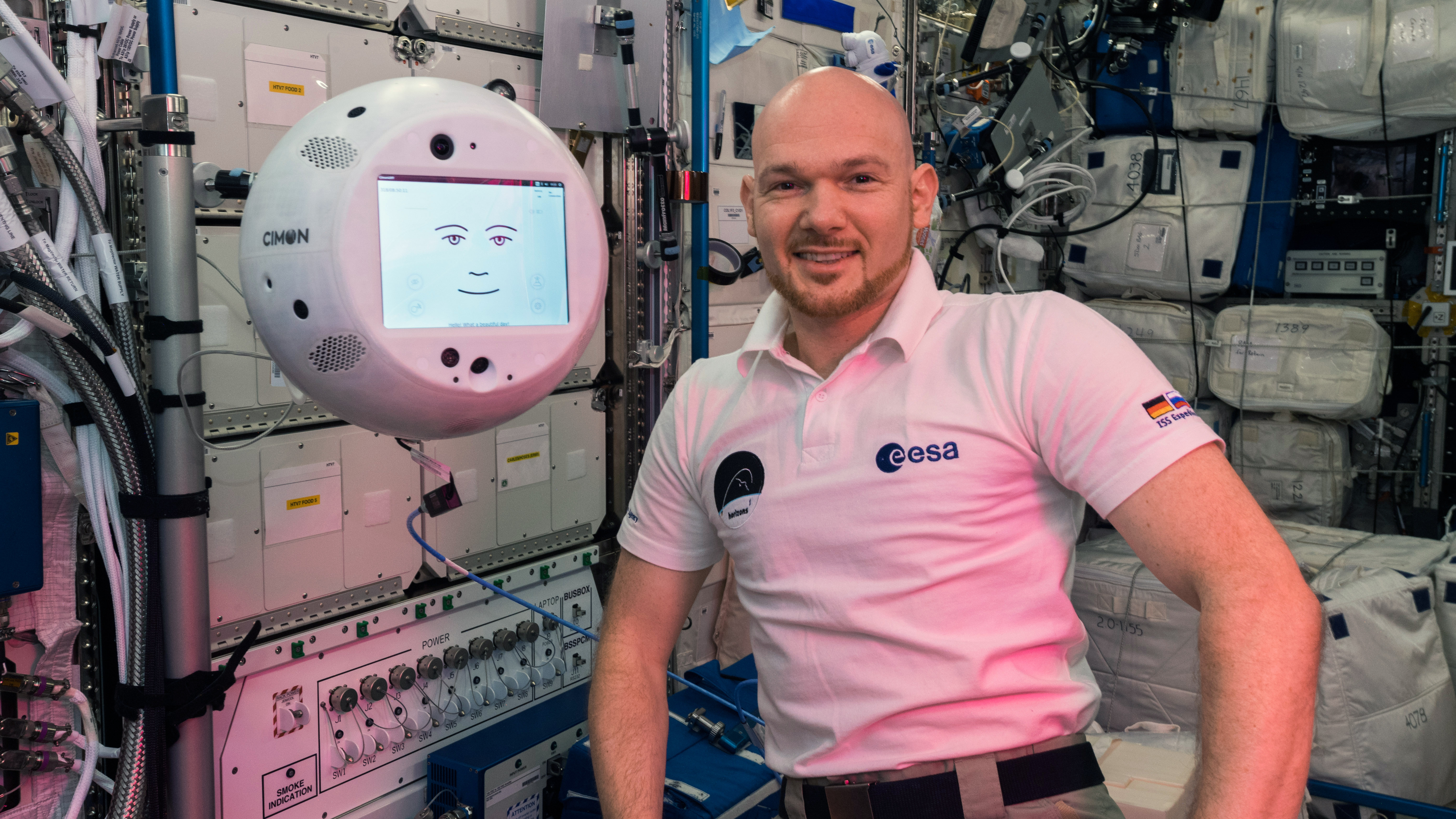
Alexander Gerst aside with the BIOTESC managed payload Cimon

On board the International Space Station BIOTESC is responsible for several payloads in the European module Columbus: the CIMON robot, AstroPi computers, Kubik, an incubator for biological experiments, and the Biolab.

Several experiments on the ISS have been managed from the center as of 2021; including research on rotifer organisms and Arthrospira (Cyanobacterias)

BIOTESC is one of the several ESA User Support and Operations Centers (USOCs) in Europe.
