= Robonaut =

Humanoid robot

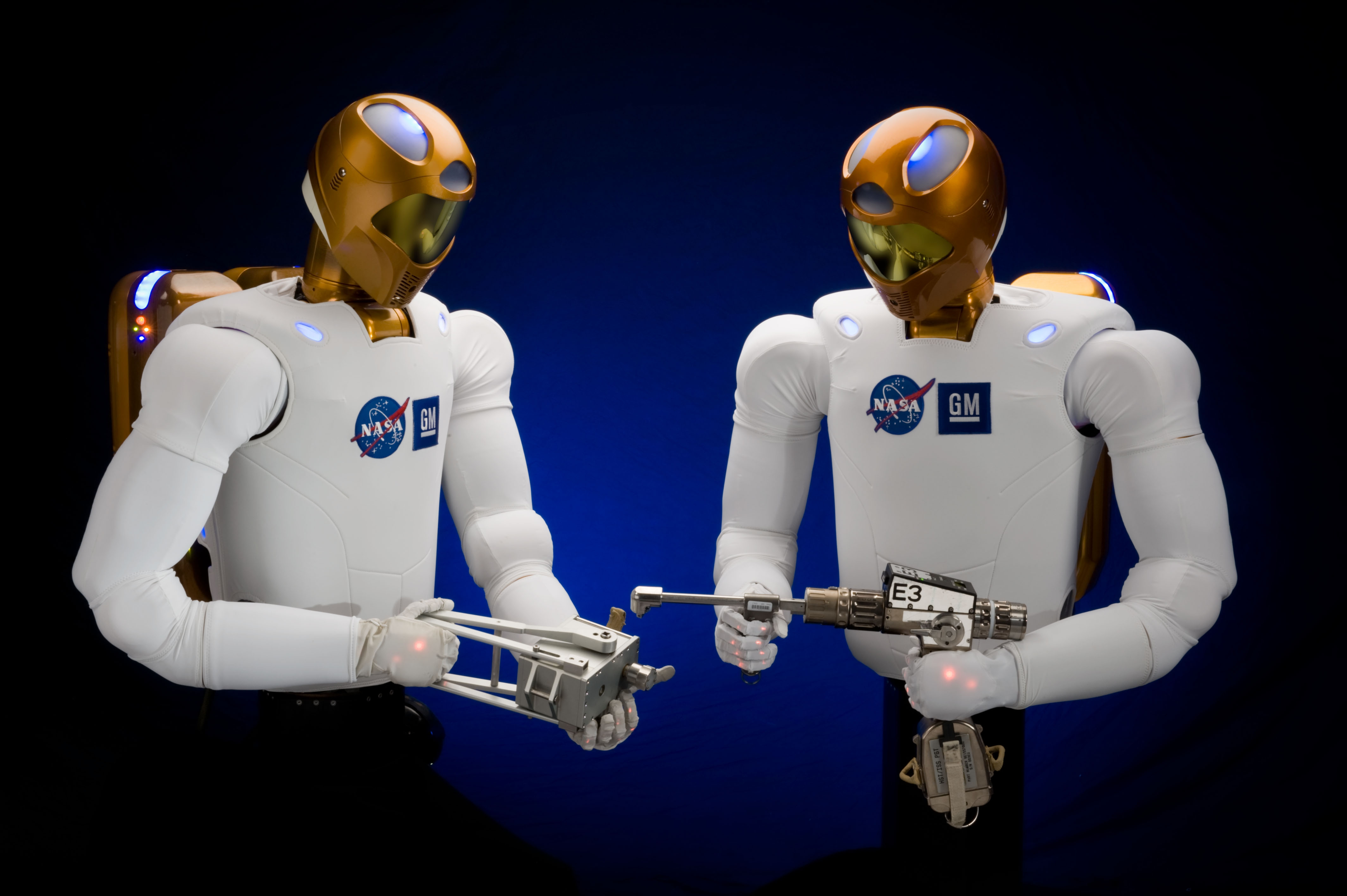
Two Robonaut 2 robots

A robonaut is a humanoid robot, part of a development project conducted by the Dexterous Robotics Laboratory at NASA's Lyndon B. Johnson Space Center (JSC) in Houston, Texas. Robonaut differs from other current space-faring robots in that, while most current space robotic systems (such as robotic arms, cranes and exploration rovers) are designed to move large objects, Robonaut's tasks require more dexterity.

The core idea behind the Robonaut series is to have a humanoid machine work alongside astronauts. Its form factor and dexterity are designed such that Robonaut "is capable of performing all the tasks required of an EVA-suited crewmember."

NASA states, "Robonauts are essential to NASA's future as we go beyond low Earth orbit", and R2 will provide performance data about how a robot may work side-by-side with astronauts.

The latest Robonaut version, R2, was delivered to the International Space Station (ISS) by STS-133 in February 2011. The first US-built robot on the ISS, R2 is a robotic torso designed to assist with crew EVAs and can hold tools used by the crew. However, Robonaut 2 does not have adequate protection needed to exist outside the space station and enhancements and modifications would be required to allow it to move around the station's interior.

As of 2018 NASA planned to return R2 for repairs and then relaunch.

== Robonaut 1 ==
Robonaut 1 (R1) was the first model. The two Robonaut versions (R1A and R1B) had many partners including DARPA. None were flown to space. Other designs for Robonaut propose uses for teleoperation on planetary surfaces, where Robonaut could explore a planetary surface while receiving instructions from orbiting astronauts above. Robonaut B was introduced in 2002, R1B is a portable version of R1. R1 had several lower bodies. One of these was the Zero-G Leg, which if Robonaut was working on the space station he would climb using the external handrails and then use his zero-g leg to latch onto the station using a WIF socket. Another was the Robotic Mobility Platform (RMP), developed in 2003, it is a base with two wheels using a Segway PT. And the four wheeled Centaur 1, which was developed in 2006. Robonaut has participated in NASA's Desert Research and Technology Studies field trials in the Arizona desert.

In 2006, the automotive company General Motors expressed interest in the project and proposed to team up with NASA. In 2007 a Space Act Agreement was signed that allowed GM and NASA to work together on the next generation of Robonaut.

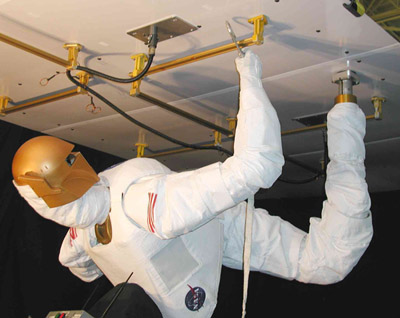
Robonaut with zero-g leg

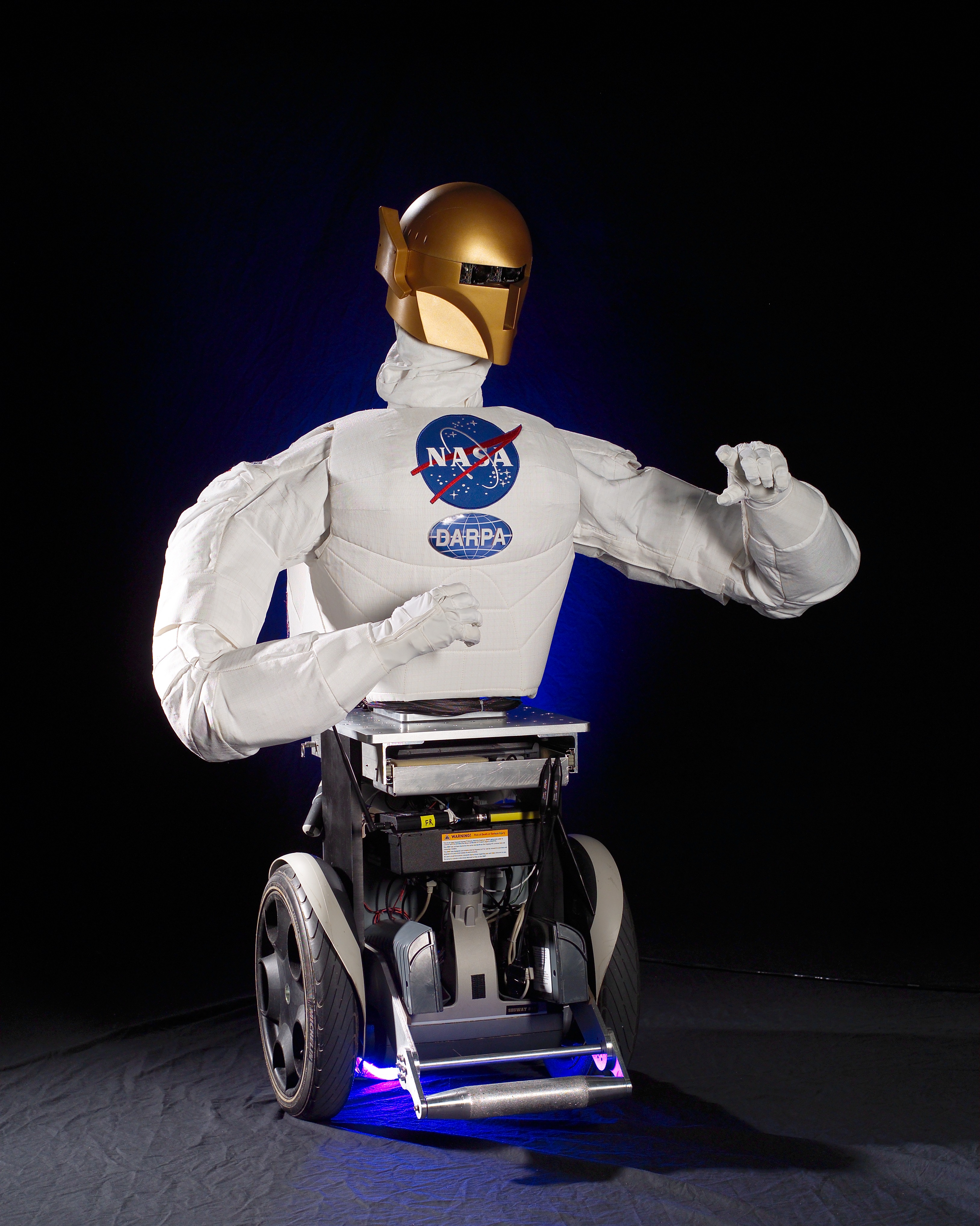
Robonaut attached to RMP

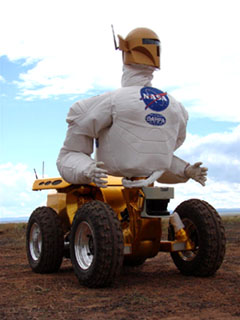
Robonaut attached to Centaur 1

== Robonaut 2 ==
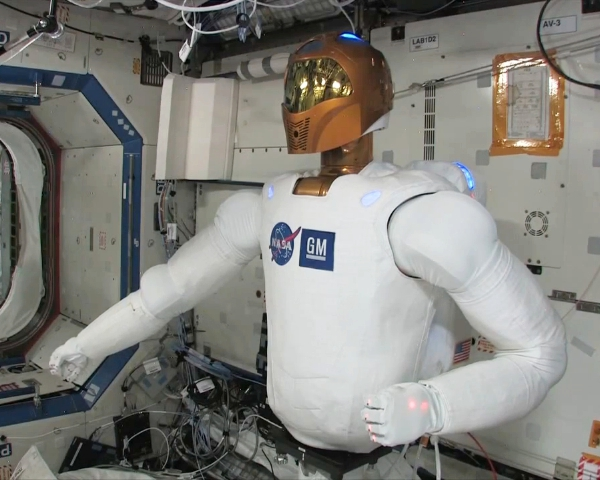
R2 moves for the first time aboard the ISS.

In February 2010, Robonaut 2 (R2) was revealed to the public. R2 is capable of speeds more than four times faster than R1, is more compact, more dexterous, and includes a deeper and wider range of sensing. It can move its arms up to 2 m/s, has a 40 lb (18 kg) payload capacity, and its hands have a grasping force of roughly 5 lb (2.3 kg) per finger. There are over 350 sensors and 38 PowerPC processors in the robot.

Station crew members will be able to operate R2, as will controllers on the ground; both will do so using telepresence. One of the improvements over the previous Robonaut generation is that R2 does not need constant supervision. In anticipation of a future destination in which distance and time delays would make continuous management problematic, R2 was designed to be set to tasks and then carry them through autonomously with periodic status checks. While not all human range of motion and sensitivity has been duplicated, the robot's hand has 12 degrees of freedom as well as 2 degrees of freedom in the wrist. The R2 model also uses touch sensors at the tips of its fingers.

R2 was designed as a prototype to be used on Earth, but mission managers were impressed by R2 and chose to send it to the ISS. Various upgrades were made to qualify it for use inside the station. The outer skin materials were exchanged to meet the station's flammability requirements, shielding was added to reduce electromagnetic interference, processors were upgraded to increase the robot's radiation tolerance, the original fans were replaced with quieter ones to accommodate the station's noise requirements, and the power system was rewired to run on the station's direct current system rather than the alternating current used on the ground.

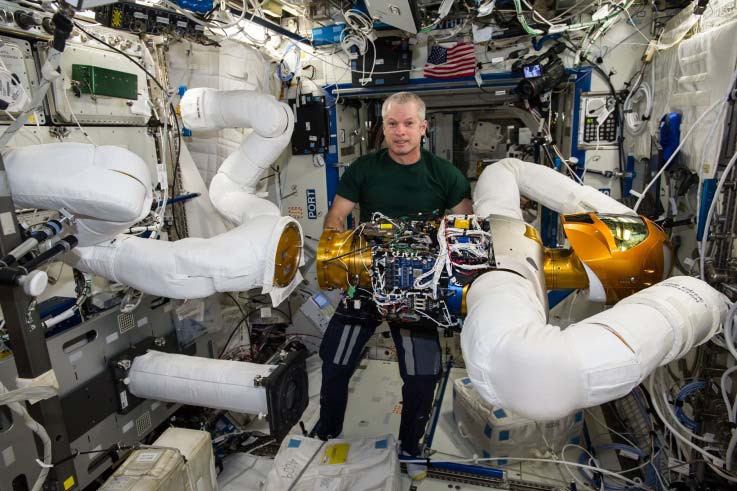
Robonaut being upgraded on-orbit

In the design of the R2 robot, a 3D time of flight imager will be used in conjunction with a stereo camera pair to provide depth information and visible stereo images to the system. This allows the R2 to "see", which is one of the basic preconditions to fulfill its tasks. To integrate the various sensor data types in a single development environment, the image processing software Halcon 9.0 from MVTec Software (Munich, Germany ) is used.

=== 2011 Testing at the ISS ===
Robonaut 2 was launched on STS-133 on February 24, 2011, and delivered to the ISS. On August 22, R2 was powered up for the first time while in low earth orbit. This was called a "power soak" which is a power system test only with no movement. On October 13, R2 moved for the first time while in space. The conditions aboard the space station provide a proving ground for robots to work shoulder to shoulder with people in microgravity. Once this has been demonstrated inside the station, software upgrades and lower bodies may be added, allowing R2 to move around the interior of the station and perform maintenance tasks, such as vacuuming or cleaning filters. A pair of legs were delivered to the ISS on SpX-3 in April 2014. The battery backpack was planned to be launched on a later flight in Summer/Fall 2014.

Further upgrades could be added to allow R2 to work outside in the vacuum of space, where R2 could help spacewalkers perform repairs, make additions to the station or conduct scientific experiments. There were initially no plans to return the launched R2 to earth.

=== 2018 Repair and possible relaunch ===
NASA announced on 1 April 2018 that R2 would return to Earth in May 2018 with CRS-14 Dragon for repair and eventual relaunch in about a year's time. As of 2018 NASA planned to return R2 for repairs and then relaunch.But as of 2024 it has not been launched into space and is on display at the Steven F. Udvar-Hazy Center at the National Air and Space Museum in northern Virginia.

NASA's experience with R2 on the station will help them understand its capabilities for possible deep space missions.

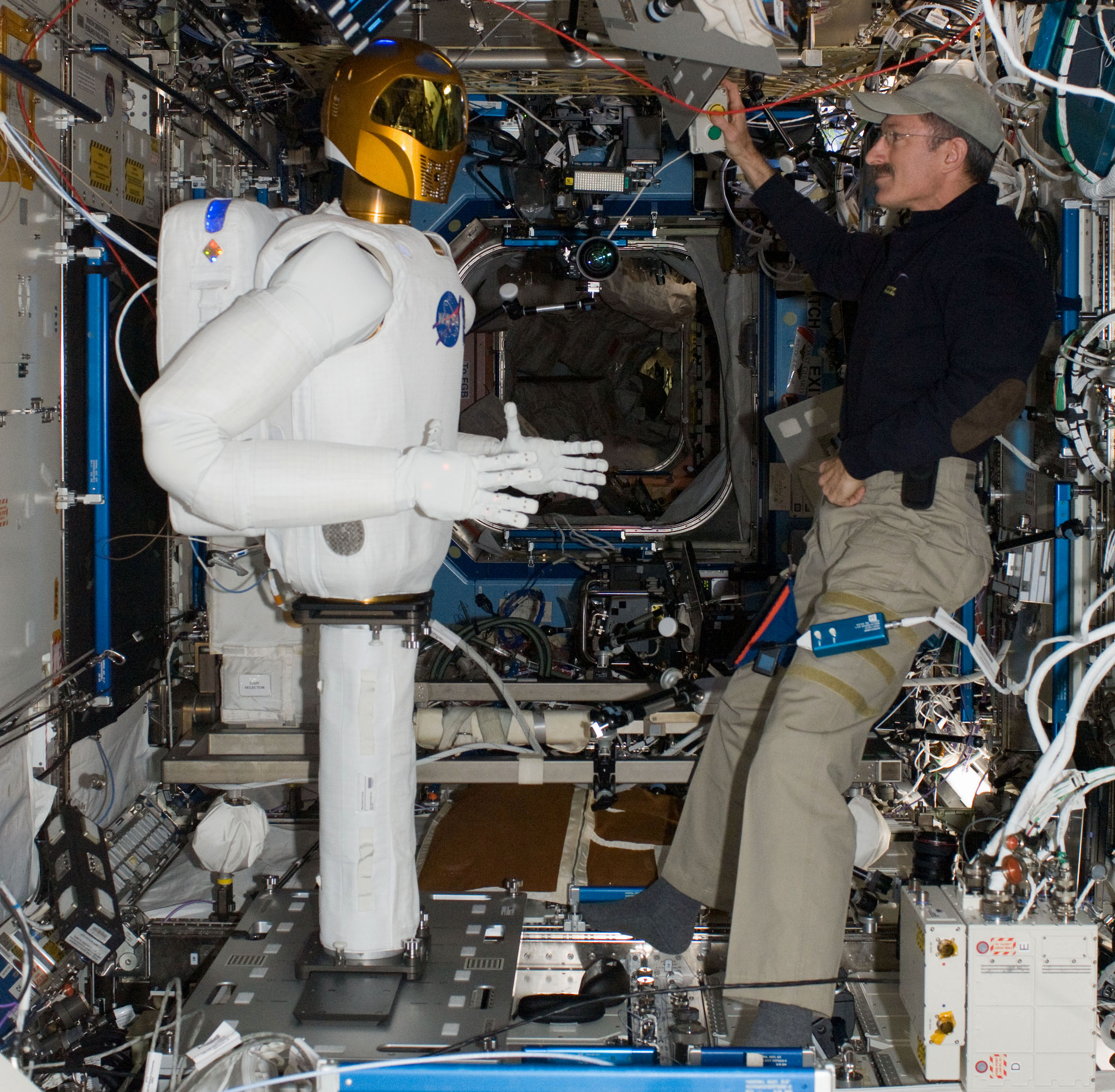
R2 aboard ISS with Dan Burbank

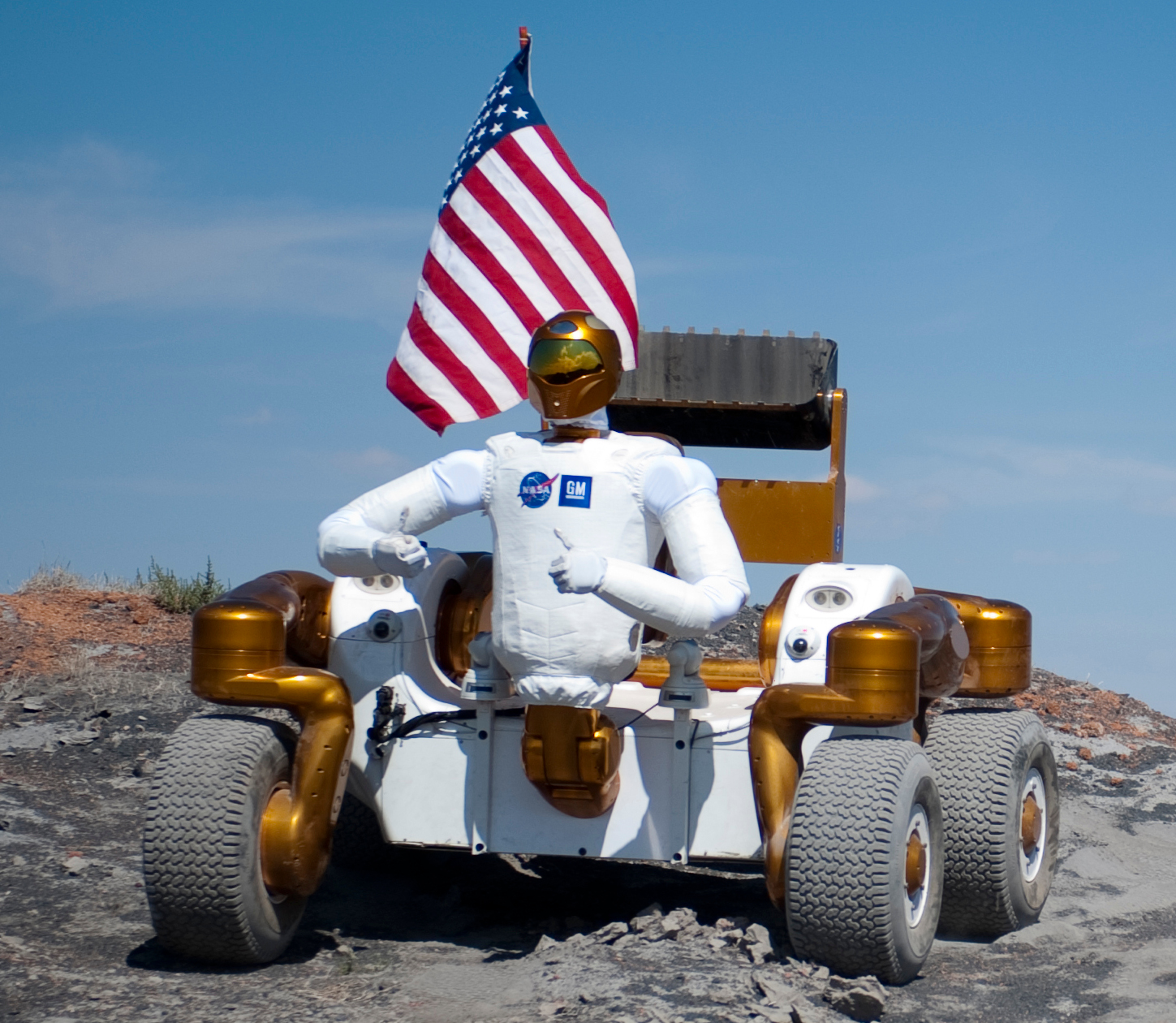
R2 attached to Centaur 2

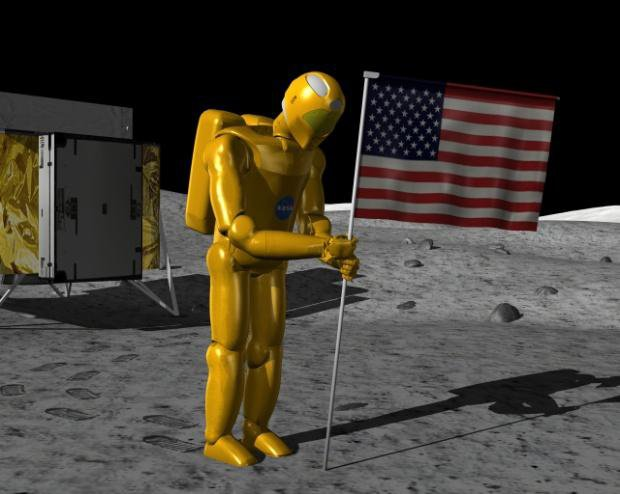
R2 with proposed terrestrial legs

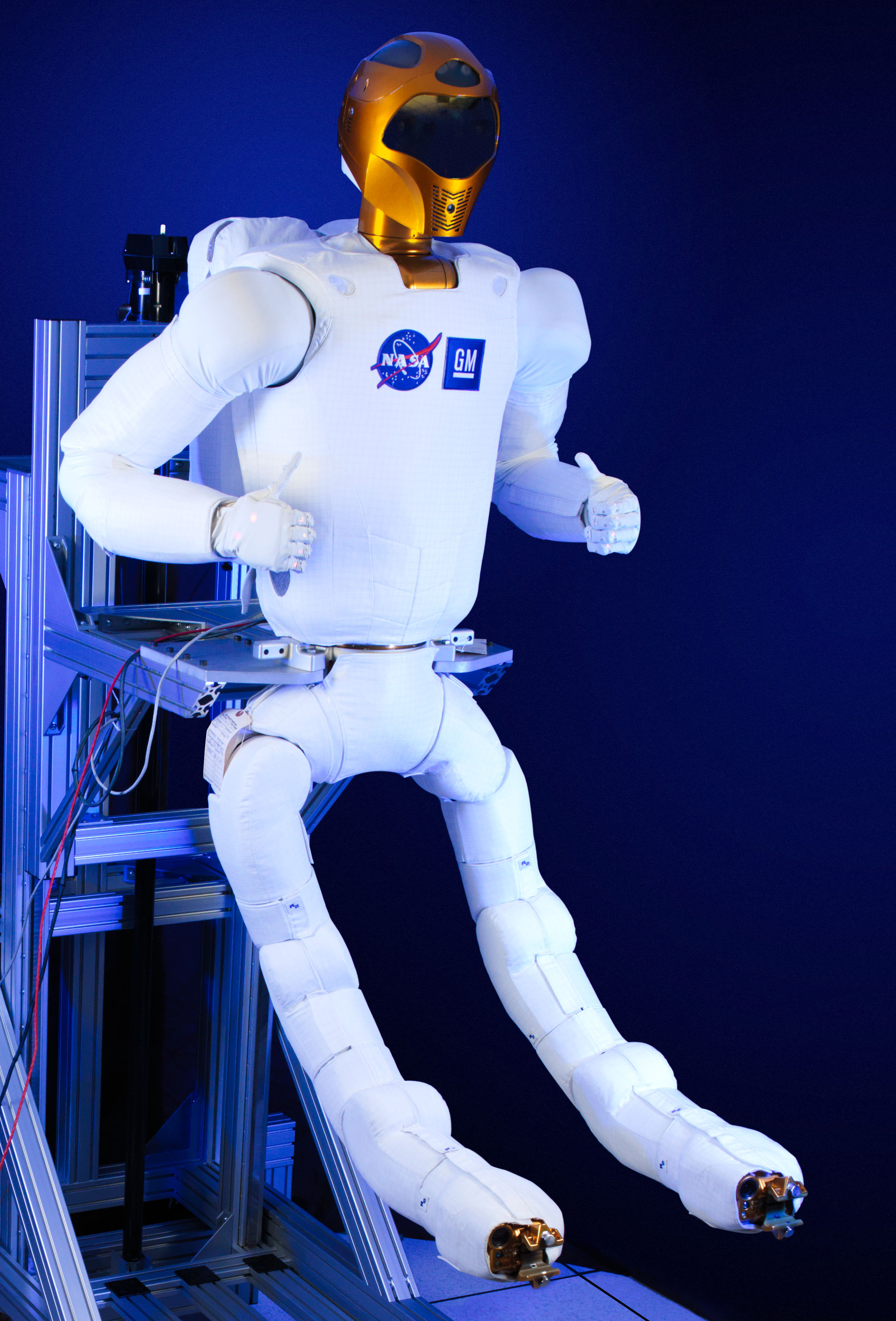
R2 with its 'climbing legs'

== Project M (R2 on the moon) ==
In late 2009, a proposed mission called Project M was announced by Johnson Space Center that, if it had been approved, would have had the objective of landing an R2 robot on the Moon within 1,000 days.

== See also ==
- List of NASA robots
- Valkyrie (R5)
- CIMON – Floating robot deployed on the ISS by Airbus
- Int-Ball – Floating camera robot deployed on the ISS by JAXA
- Justin (robot), a similar robot on Earth by DLR
- Kirobo, first fully humanoid robot astronaut
- FEDOR (robot) – Russian humanoid robot astronaut
