= NASA robots =

NASA has made various robotic devices to aid, augment, or substitute for astronauts in order to do difficult or rote tasks such as repairs in dangerous environments (such as those with radiation or micrometeorite risks), routine procedures (video capture), etc.

== Robonaut ==
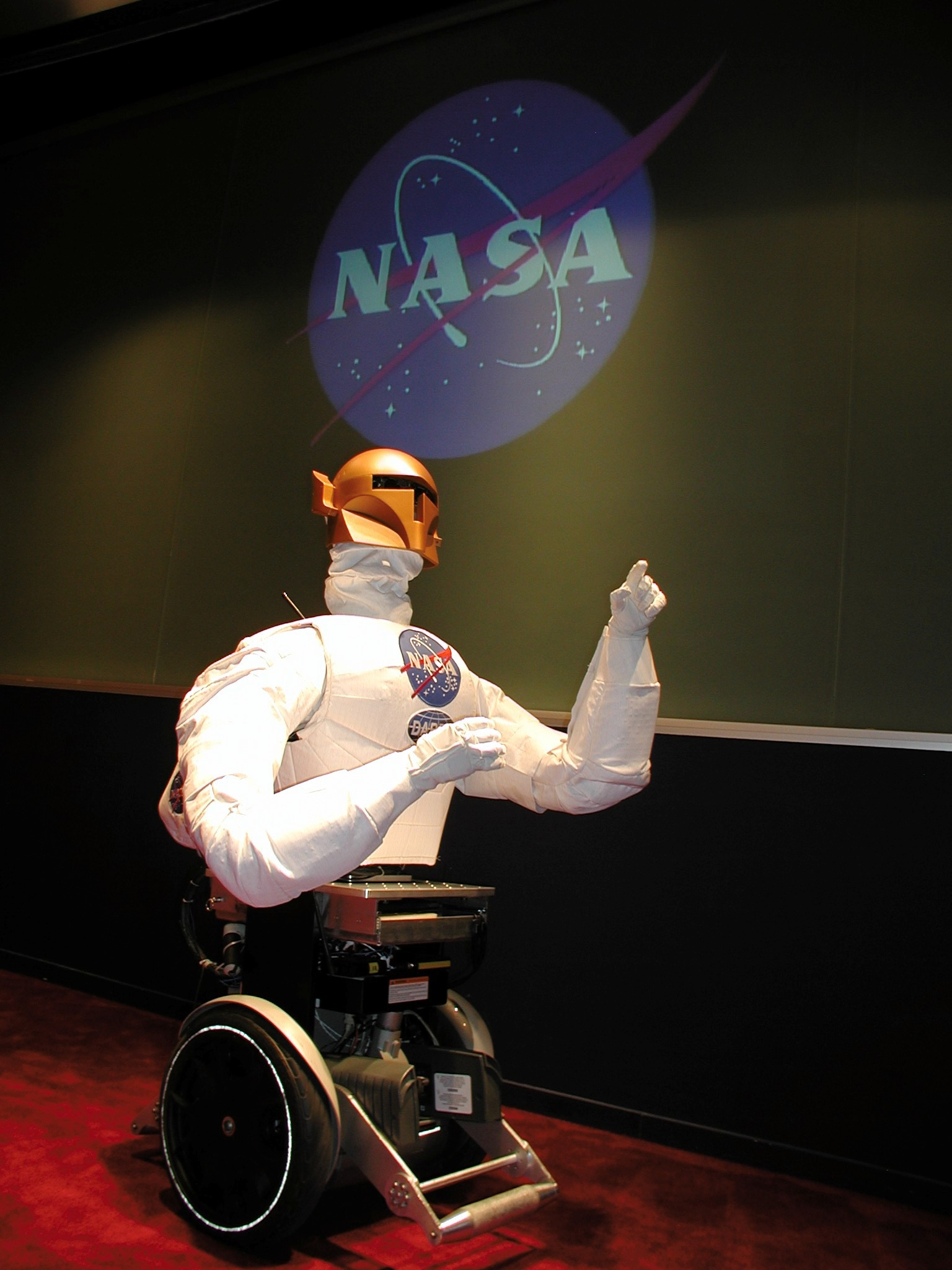
Robonaut resting on a Segway HT.

Robonaut is a joint DARPA–NASA project designed to create a humanoid robot which can function as an equivalent to humans during the 1970s and exploration. The large goal of the Robonaut project is to build a robot with dexterity that exceeds that of a suited astronaut. Currently there are four different robonauts with others in development, this variety of robonauts allows for the study of different stages of mobility and tasking for each situation. All four versions of this robot use various locomotion methods. Some versions of the robot use the Segway HT for locomotion . Robonaut uses telepresence and various levels of robotic autonomy. While not all human range of motion and sensitivity has been duplicated, the robot's hand has fourteen degrees of freedom and uses touch sensors at the tips of its fingers. One of the benefits of a humanoid robot is that it would not have to need a whole new set of tools.

There are currently two working robonauts, R1 and R2. R1 and R2 are both highly capable robots and are able to handle a wide range of tools and tasks. Robonaut 2 or R2 was flown to the space station as part of STS-133 mission and was the first humanoid robot in space. In the future legs will be added, and work is being completed to prepare Robotnaut to venture out into the vacuum of space.

== RASSOR ==
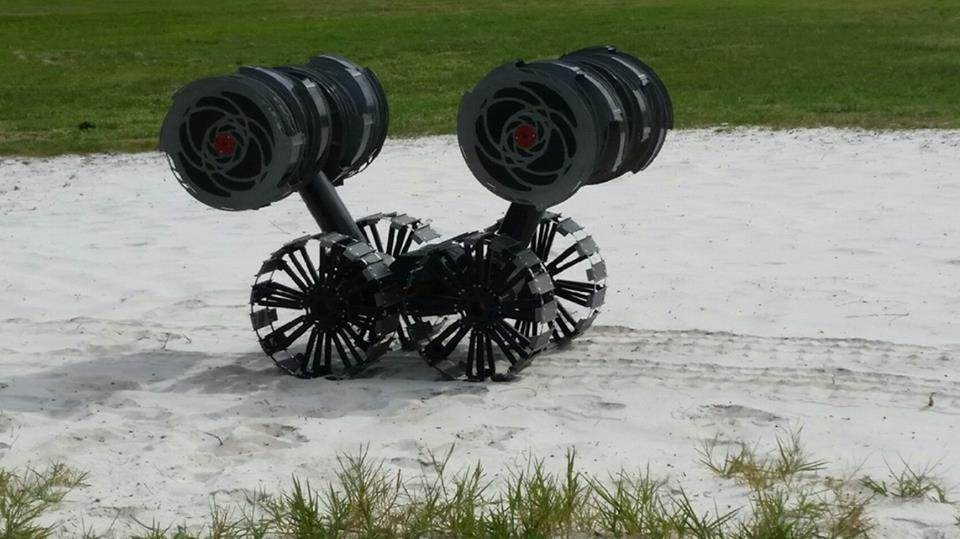
NASA's Regolith Advanced Surface Systems Operations Robot (RASSOR 2)

Pronounced "Razor", stands for Regolith Advanced Surface Systems Operations Robot. It is a lunar robot that will autonomously excavate soil when it is near completion, with its small tank like chassis with a Drum excavator and either side mounted on arms which can help the robot climb over obstacles that may be in its way. With these arms the robot can successfully right itself if it flips over and lift itself off the ground the clear its tracks of debris. With the drums positioned vertically RASSOR stands at about 2.5 ft. tall and expected to weigh about 100 pounds. With an average speed of about 20 centimeters per second (five times faster than the Curiosity rover's top speed on mars) the RASSOR will work 16 hours a day for many years (a minimum of 5 years as stated in the design requirements). In its design NASA has moved away from its usual fragile and slow robot to design something more robust and hardy. The 2 excavating drums are designed to slowly remove soil into a hopper that can hold 40 pounds of material. The little robot will then drive to a processing plant where the lunar soil could be chemically broken down and converted into rocket fuel, water or breathing air for astronauts working on the moon and even possibly Mars. In-situ resource utilization of lunar soil for fuel could save the costs of launching a rocket as 90% of the rocket's weight consists of propellants.

The team working on the RASSOR has found some flaws with using tank tracks as they can become jammed with small pebbles and sand which could cause the tracks to fall off. The team is weighing their options and considering changing the material of the tracks or switching to wheels. The RASSOR 2 is already being designed and the prototype could be much closer to something NASA actually would launch.

== Spidernaut ==
Spidernaut is an arachnid-inspired Extra Vehicular Robot (EVR) that is being designed by a NASA for construction, maintenance, and repair projects in future space missions that would be too difficult or too dangerous for a human. The Spidernaut's legs can move at three different points, one rotary joint in the hip and two more joints that are linear actuated. Each leg weighs 40 pounds but is capable of supporting 100 pounds and exerting upwards of 250 pounds of force. With the robot's final weight of nearly 600 pounds evenly spread out across its eight legs, Spidernaut will be able to climb across many surfaces, including solar panels and the exterior of spacecraft without causing any damage. The feet of the robot are modular, meaning they can be removed and replaced for different situations that the robot may be placed in. The avionics and other electrical systems of the Spidernaut are located in what would be its thorax and are made up of brushless DC motor controllers and power and data distributors along with the power source. The robot is powered by a 72 V/3600-watt-hour lithium-ion battery, which feeds a Power Conditioning and Distribution Module which down converts the 72 V main bus to all the needed voltages for all the different devices on board. NASA has also begun experimenting with a "web" like cable deployment system that would allow the robot to climb and hang above structures that cannot support even light forces.

== ATHLETE ==
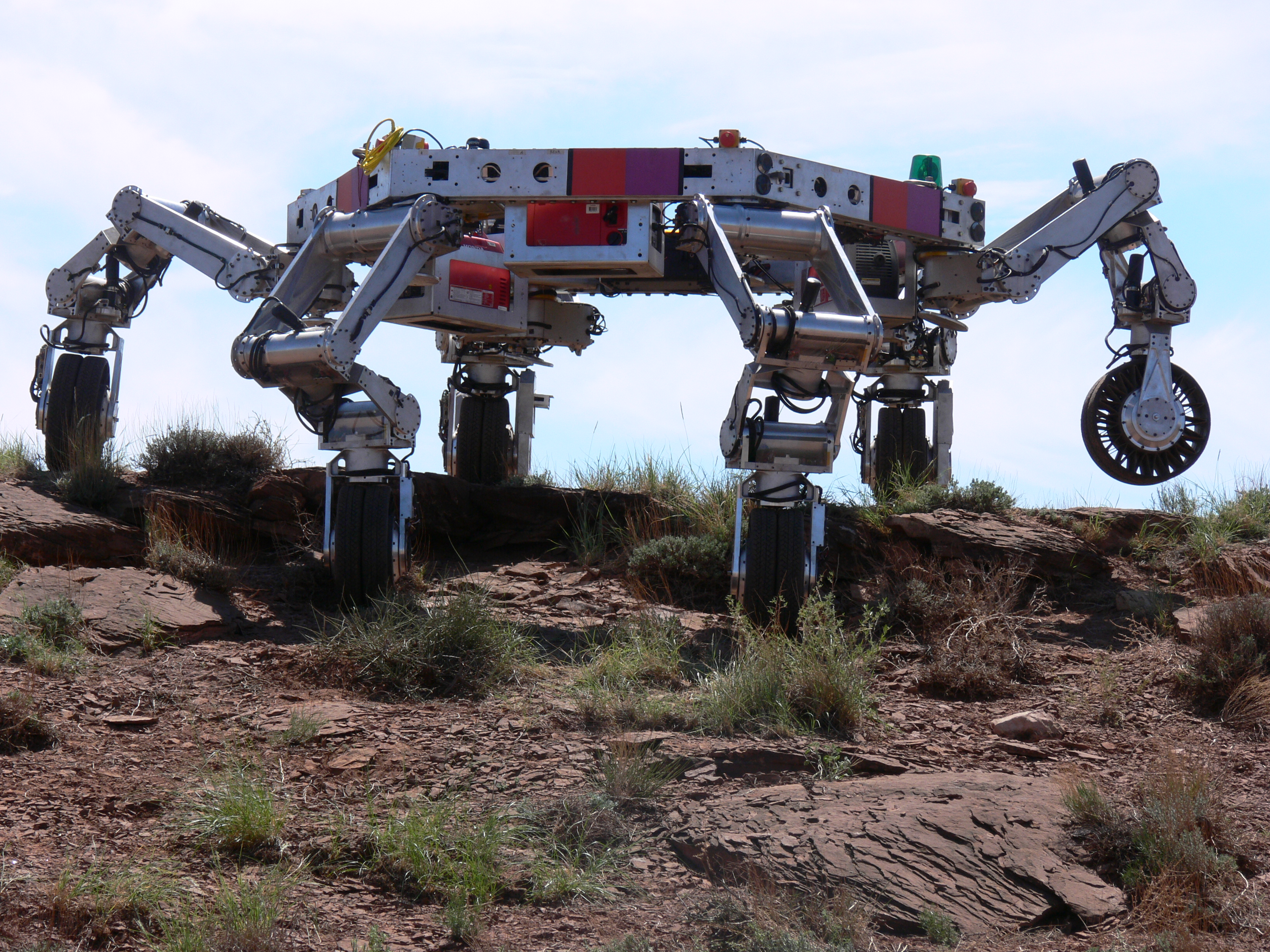
ATHLETE climbs a hill

ATHLETE (All-Terrain Hex-Legged Extra-Terrestrial Explorer) is a six-limbed robotic lunar rover test-bed that is being developed in the Jet Propulsion Laboratory (JPL) at California Institute of Technology. ATHLETE is a test bed for various systems that could be used for lunar or Martian exploration. Each of the ATHLETE's six limbs have six degrees of freedom meaning they have six independently operated joints. For general traveling purposes the ATHLETE rolls on its six wheels but if it encounters more rugged and extreme terrain, it is able to lock each wheel into place and walk using its limbs. The first generation ATHLETE was developed in 2005 and consisted of 6, six-degree-of-freedom limbs mounted to the frame of the robot. With a standing height of 2 m (6.5 ft) and a hexagonal frame of 2.75 m (9 ft), the ATHLETE weighs about 850 kg (1875 lb) and can carry a load of up to 300 kg (660 lb). only two were ever constructed in 2005 and one is still operational today.

The Second Generation ATHLETE built in 2009. The robot was redeveloped and implemented as a corresponding team of two 3 limbed robots, known as Tri-ATHLETs. This advancement allows for better cargo handling and loading and unloading of cargo as the two robots can connect under the cargo dock and separate from each other and lower the cargo at its destination. The second generation ATHLETE stands at a little over 4 m (13 ft) and has a load capacity of 450 kg (990 lb). Each limb of the ATHLETE can be used as a universal manipulator. Each limb has a variety of quick deploy tool adapters that allow the robot to use a multitude of tools from its "tool belt". The tools use the same 1+ horsepower motors that the wheels use and allow the robot to perform many different tasks such as drilling, clamping, digging and many other tool functions.

== Dextre ==
Dextre is a two armed robot, or telemanipulator, which is part of the Mobile Servicing System on the International Space Station (ISS). It replaces some activities otherwise requiring spacewalks. It was launched March 11, 2008 on mission STS-123.

== SPHERES ==
Spheres stands for Synchronized Position Hold, Engage, Reorient, Experimental Satellites. These satellites are about the size of a bowling ball and are in the experimental phase at NASA. Each Sphere is self-contained with its own power, propulsion, computers, and navigation equipment. The Spheres are designed to be used inside a space station to test how well the spheres can follow a set of detailed flight instructions. While inside a space station three spheres will be given a set of instructions such as an autonomous rendezvous and docking maneuver. The results from the sphere testing will be applied to satellite servicing, vehicle assembly, and future space craft that will be designed to fly in a formation.

== Curiosity rover ==
The Mars rover Curiosity is a mobile laboratory that was launched from Cape Canaveral in 2011. The Curiosity landed on Mars surface August 6, 2012. This was the largest rover NASA has put on Mars, being twice as long and five times as heavy as its processors. Despite the extra size the Curiosity took many design elements from the previous generation of Mars rovers such as six wheel drive, rocker-bogie suspension, and cameras mounted to the mast of the rover to help the mission's team direct the rover. However unlike the previous generation the Curiosity contains an entire inboard laboratory for analyzing the soil and rocks on Mars. NASA engineered the Curiosity to be capable of rolling over obstacles up to 65 centimeters high and traverse up to about 200 meters per day on Martian terrain. Curiosity got its electrical power from a Radioisotope thermoelectric generator.

== Pioneer ==
Pioneer is a robot developed in response to the Chernobyl disaster to clear rubble, make maps, and acquire samples inside the Chernobyl Unit 4 reactor building. The Pioneer project is a collaboration of many groups inside and outside NASA. The concrete sampling drill on the Pioneer is designed to estimate the material strength of the floors and walls while it cuts out samples for later structural analysis. Ownership was transferred to Ukraine in 1999 and Ukrainian experts began learning to use it.

== See also ==
- Engineering
- Space exploration
- Space logistics
- Space logistics
- Spacecraft
- Spacecraft propulsion
- Spaceflight
