= Int-Ball =

Ball camera on the International Space Station

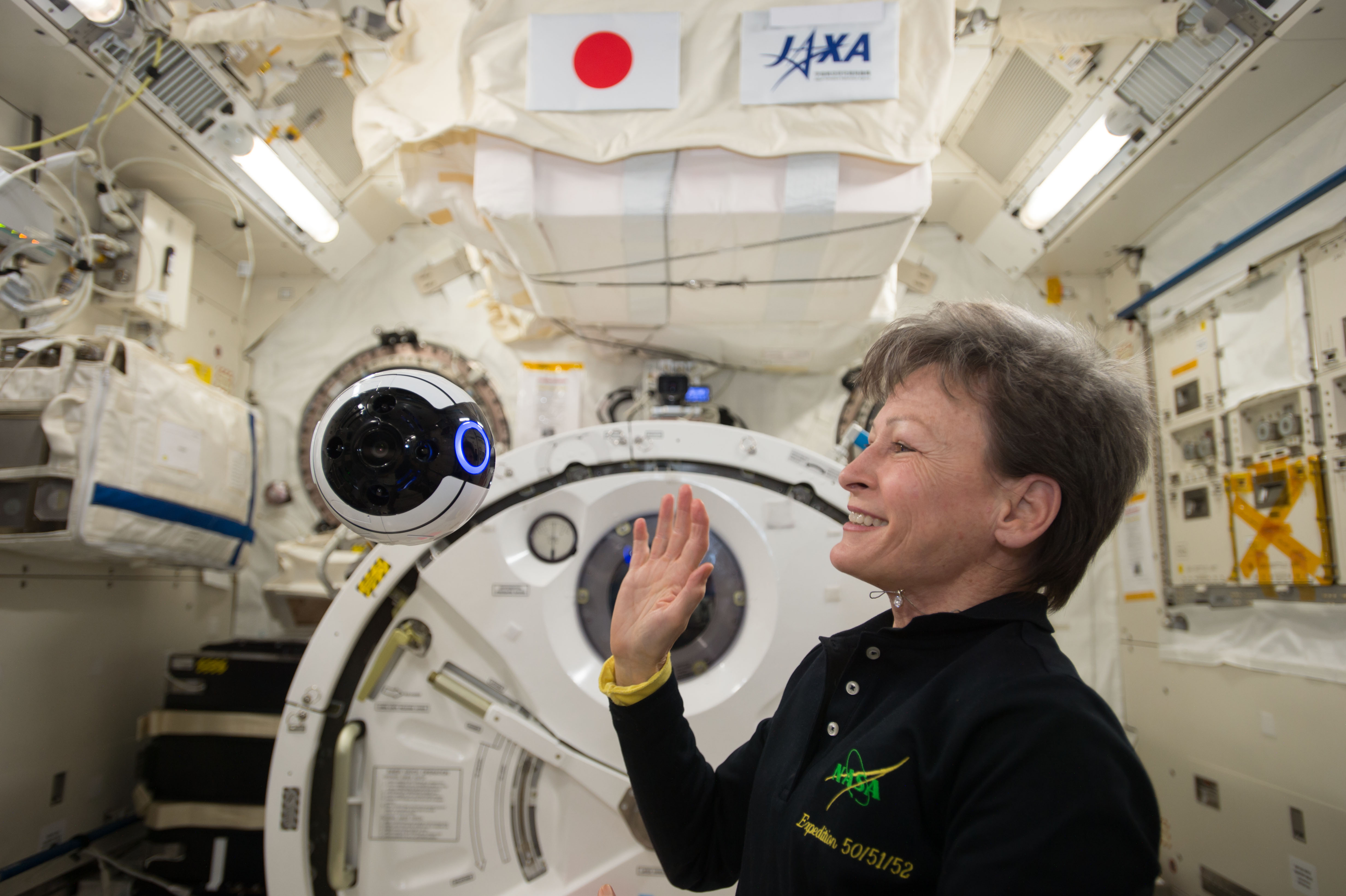
Peggy Whitson interacting with the JEM Internal Ball Camera.

The Int-Ball, also known as the JEM Internal Ball Camera, is a series of experimental, autonomous, self-propelled, and maneuverable ball cameras, deployed in the Japanese Kibō module of the International Space Station. The devices are intended to perform some of the photo-video documentation tasks aboard the ISS, reducing the workload of the station's crew. As of May 2024, there have been two different Int-Ball cameras delivered to the station.

== Internal Ball Camera ==
The first ball camera was delivered aboard SpaceX CRS-11 on June 4, 2017. The Int-Ball was designed by the Japan Aerospace Exploration Agency and is controlled and monitored by a team of JAXA ground controllers.

The Int-Ball naturally floats in the station's zero-gravity environment, allowing it to maneuver freely within the ISS. It weighs 1 kg (2.2 lb), and is 15 cm (5.9 in) in diameter. The device contains 3 reaction wheels and an array of 12 small electric fans mounted on the ball's outer surface. The unit shares many similarities with Earth-based drone motion control and drone camera systems. The Int-Ball's motion control system is capable of executing a rotation on any axis, and is also capable of overall movement in any general direction. The internal structural elements and outer body of the Int-Ball system were produced using 3D printing. The simulated "eyes", consisting of two blue light rings mounted on the exterior of the ball, represent the direction of the "gaze" of the Int-Ball, which is in fact a single camera lens situated in the approximate center of the two "eyes". The lights serve as a visual indicator that the camera is recording, and can also indicate errors by turning red. The device can be recharged via USB.

The Int-Ball system was designed with the hope of reducing or eliminating the amount of time spent by astronauts aboard the ISS in photo-video documentation activities, which have been estimated to consume approximately 10% of the astronauts' work time. The robotic photo-video documentation duties that the Int-Ball performs have been likened by some to the types of responsibilities that the fictional R2-D2 of the Star Wars movie series appeared to undertake.

== Internal Ball Camera 2 ==
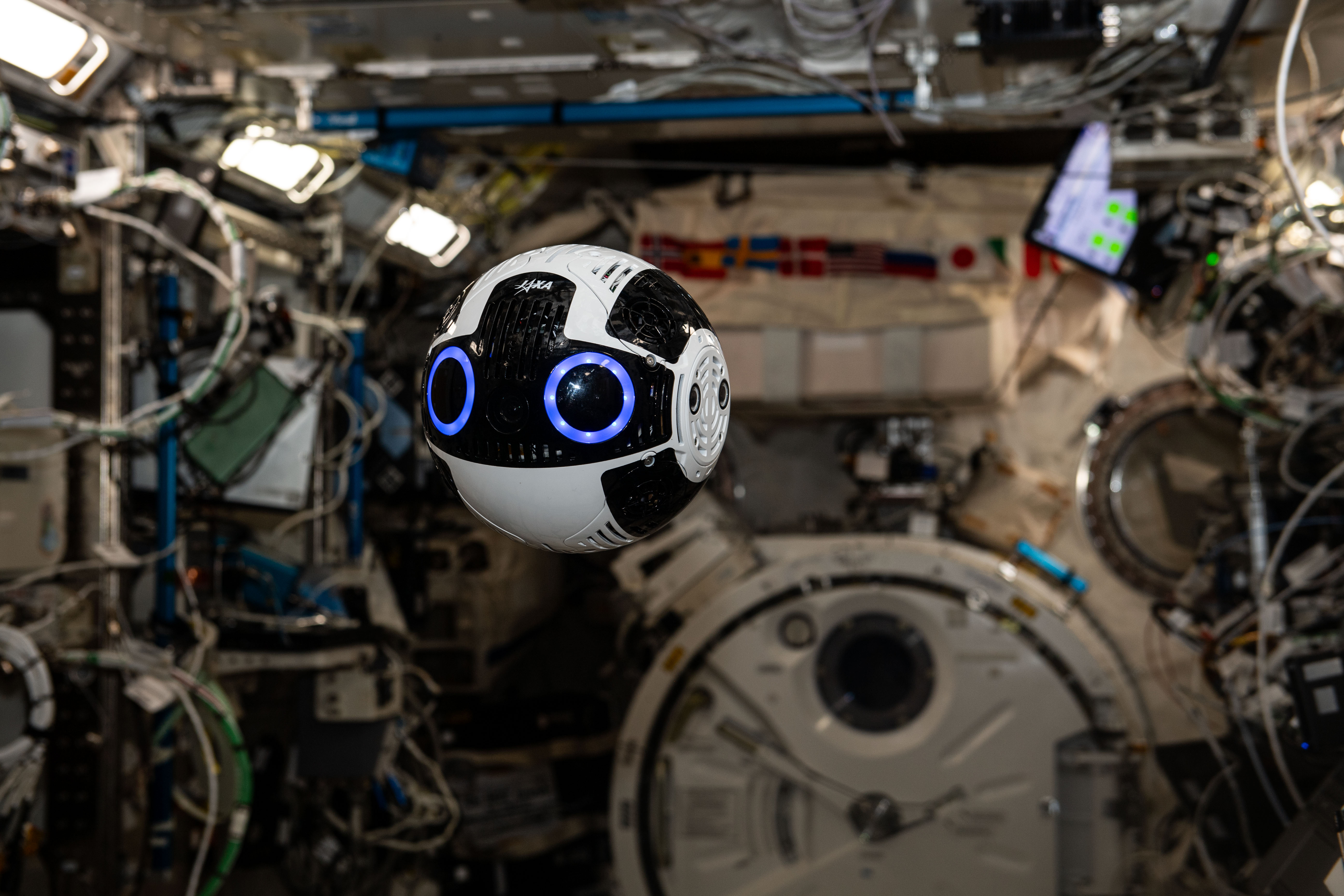
The Internal Ball Camera 2 floating inside the Kibō module.

The Internal Ball Camera 2 is an updated version of the device. It was launched with the SpaceX CRS-28 resupply mission, and underwent the first test flight aboard the ISS on October 17, 2023.

It is larger than the previous version at 20 centimetres (7.9 in), and weighs approximately 3.3 kilograms (7.3 lb). The robot has a main camera capable of recording 4K video, and stereo camera on the side. The device has improved navigation software, which uses the stereo camera, as well as an inertial measurement unit. As the first Int-Ball sometimes experienced problems with drift in the airflow aboard the station, Int-Ball 2 is equipped with a more powerful propulsion system, utilizing eight enclosed propellers.

The system also includes a docking station. The robot can be docked to the docking station for recharging and stowing without manual assistance from the station crew.

== See also ==
- CIMON, floating robot deployed on the ISS by Airbus
- Kirobo, interactive humanoid robot deployed on the ISS by JAXA
- Robonaut2, semi-humanoid robot deployed on the ISS by NASA
