= Kounotori 4 =

2013 Japanese resupply spaceflight to the ISS

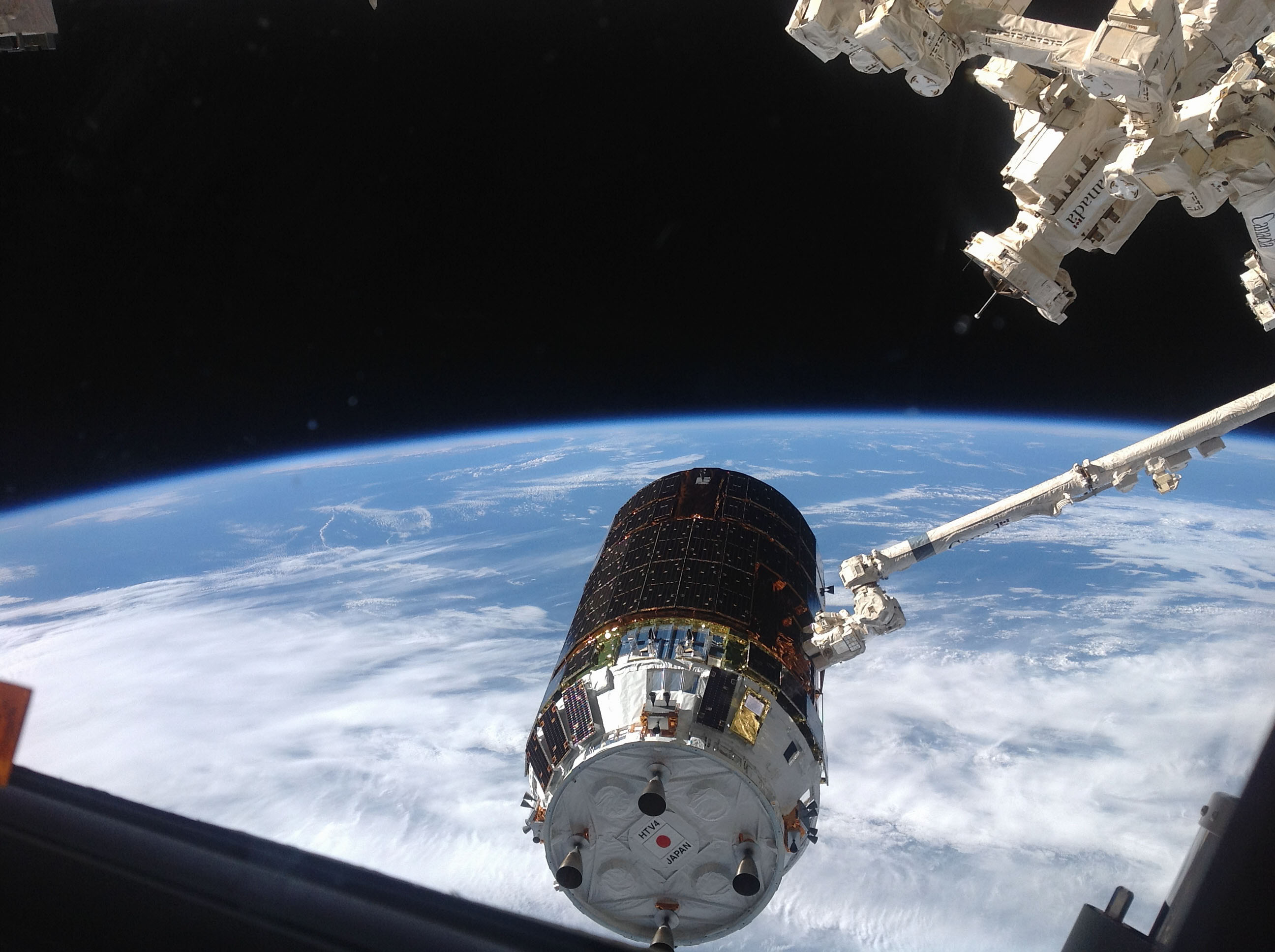
- HTV-4 being grappled by the SSRMS on 9 August 2013
- Mission type: ISS resupply
- Operator: JAXA
- COSPAR ID: 2013-040A
- SATCAT no.: 39221
- Mission duration: 35 days

Spacecraft properties
- Spacecraft type: H-II Transfer Vehicle (HTV)
- Manufacturer: Mitsubishi Heavy Industries (MHI)
- Launch mass: 15900 kg
- Dry mass: 10500 kg

Start of mission
- Launch date: 3 August 2013, 19:48:46 UTC
- Rocket: H-IIB No. 4
- Launch site: Tanegashima, Yoshinobu-2
- Contractor: Mitsubishi Heavy Industries

End of mission
- Disposal: Deorbited
- Decay date: 7 September 2013, 06:37 UTC

Orbital parameters
- Reference system: Geocentric orbit
- Regime: Low Earth orbit
- Inclination: 51.66°

Berthing at ISS
- Berthing port: Harmony
- RMS capture: 9 August 2013, 11:22 UTC
- Berthing date: 9 August 2013, 15:28 UTC
- Unberthing date: 4 September 2013, 12:07 UTC
- RMS release: 4 September 2013, 16:20 UTC
- Time berthed: 25 days, 20 hours, 29 minutes

Cargo
- Mass: 5400 kg
- Pressurised: 3900 kg
- Unpressurised: 1500 kg

Kounotori 4, also known as HTV-4, was the fourth flight of the H-II Transfer Vehicle, an uncrewed cargo spacecraft launched in August 2013 to resupply the International Space Station. It launched from Tanegashima Space Center aboard H-IIB No. 4 (H-IIB F4) rocket on 3 August 2013 and connected to ISS by 9 August 2013; it carried 5,400 kilograms (11,900 lb) of cargo. Kounotori 4 undocked on 4 September 2013 and was destroyed by reentry on 7 September 2013.

== Specifications ==
Major changes of Kounotori 4 from previous HTV are:

- Although the previous Kounotori 3 used reaction control system (RCS) thrusters by IHI Aerospace, Kounotori 4 uses the RCS manufactured by Aerojet, similar to HTV-1 and Kounotori 2. This will be the last Kounotori to use Aerojet parts, and future Kounotori are to use IHI's.
- One of the solar panels was replaced with a sensor module to measure the surface electrical potential when berthing to ISS.
- Continued improvement of ground operation to allow more late access cargo.
- First time for Kounotori to reenter the atmosphere with unpressurized waste cargo (a NASA engineering experiment module STP-H3).
- The orbital trajectory after departure from ISS is adjusted so that the reentry is to coincide with ISS passing over, to allow the atmospheric entry to be observed from ISS.

== Cargo ==
Kounotori 4 carries about 5,400 kilograms (11,900 lb) of cargo, consisting of 3,900 kilograms (8,600 lb) in the pressurized compartment and 1,500 kilograms (3,300 lb) in the unpressurized compartment.

Pressurized cargo include: CANA (Cabin network system for Kibō), Stirling-Cycle Refrigerator (FROST), ISS Cryogenic Experiment Storage Box (ICE Box), i-Ball and Re-Entry Data Recorder (REDR), four CubeSats: (PicoDragon, ArduSat-1, ArduSat-X, TechEdSat-3p), and the Kirobo (robot companion for Koichi Wakata).

Unpressurized cargo include: MBSU (Main Bus Switching Units) and UTA (Utility Transfer Assembly) which are ISS system spare parts, and a NASA experiment module STP-H4 (Space Test Program - Houston 4).

== Operation ==
=== Launch and rendezvous with ISS ===
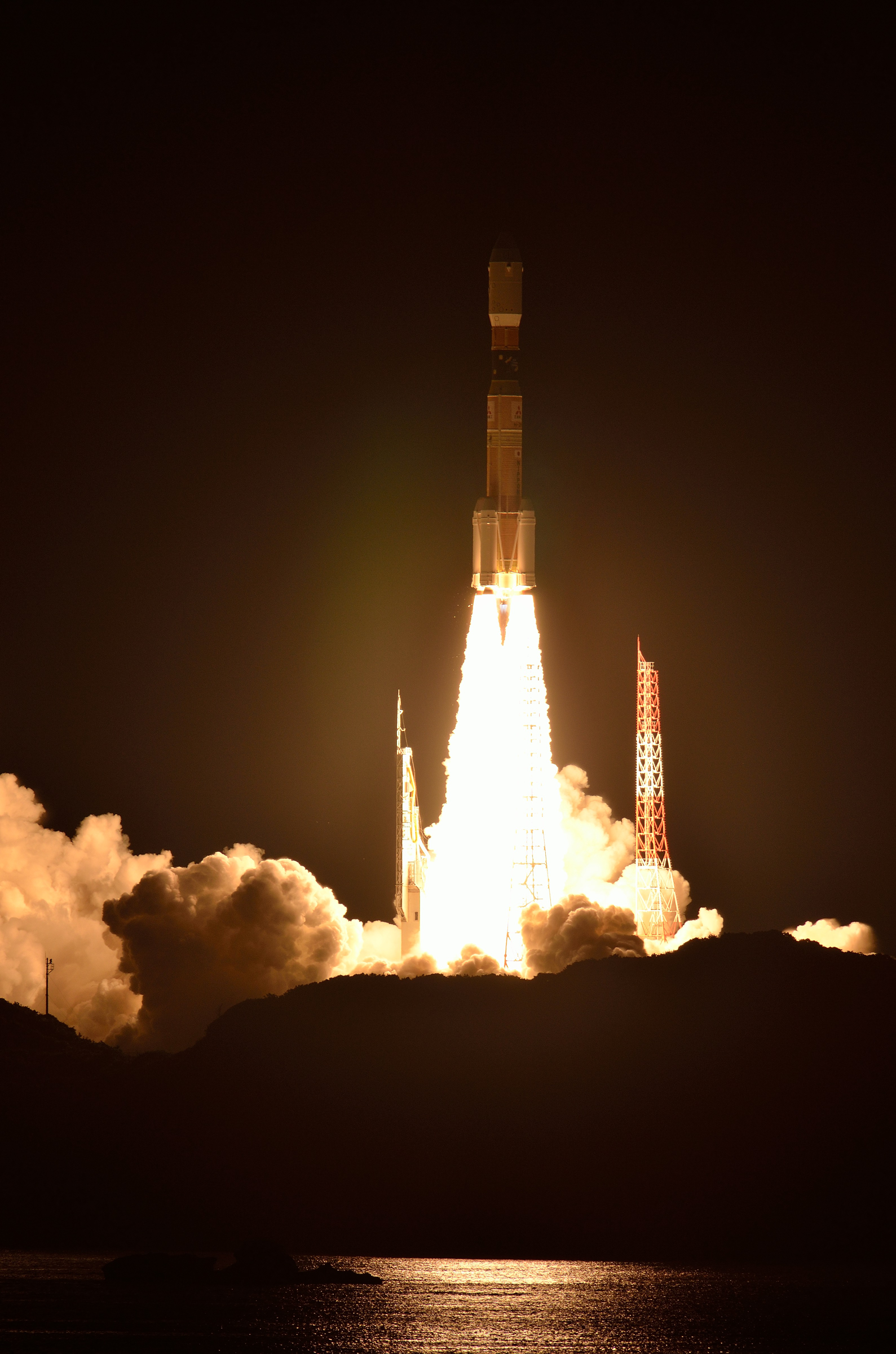
The H-IIB rocket carrying Kounotori 4 lifts off from the Tanegashima Space Center early on 4 August 2013 (Japan Standard Time).

Kounotori 4 was successfully launched atop a H-IIB carrier rocket flying from pad 2 of the Yoshinobu Launch Complex at Tanegashima Space Center at 19:48:46 UTC on 3 August 2013. After 5.5 days of orbital manoeuvres, it arrived to Approach Initiation Point (5 kilometres (3.1 mi) behind ISS) at 05:31 UTC, 9 August 2013, and started the final approach sequence at 08:05 UTC. The ISS's robotic arm Canadarm2 grappled Kounotori 4 at 11:22 UTC, and fastened to ISS's Common berthing mechanism (CBM) on 16:32 UTC. All berthing operations were completed at 18:38 UTC.

=== Operation while berthed to ISS ===
The ISS crew opened the hatch and entered to Pressurized Logistics Carrier (PLC) at 11:11 UTC, 10 August 2013.

=== Departure from ISS and reentry to Earth atmosphere ===
Kounotori 4 undocked from the ISS at 16:20 UTC, on 4 September 2013, Karen Nyberg then used the stations Canadarm2 to manoeuvre HTV-4 away from the International Space Station.

Trajectory after the release was controlled so that the reentry coincides with ISS passing over to observe it. Japanese flight controllers have deorbited HTV-4 on 06:11 UTC, on 7 September 2013, and it reentered to the atmosphere around 06:37 UTC, on7 September 2013.
