= ArduSat =

Arduino-based CubeSat science project

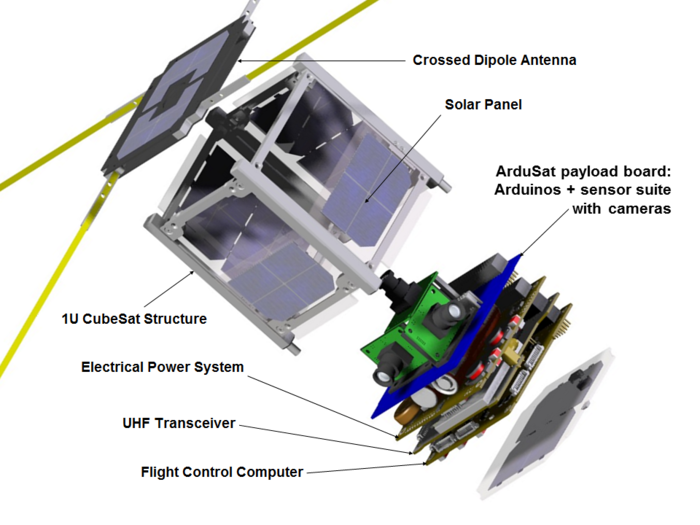
- CAD drawing of ArduSat
- Mission type: Citizen science
- Operator: NanoSatisfi LLC
- Website: Nanosatisfi.com

Spacecraft properties
- Spacecraft type: 1U CubeSat
- Launch mass: 1 kilogram (2.2 lb)

Start of mission
- Launch date: 3 August 2013, 19:48:46 UTC
- Rocket: H-IIB
- Launch site: Tanegashima Y2
- Contractor: JAXA, NanoRacks
- Deployed from: ISS
- Deployment date: 19 November 2013, 12:18:00 UTC

Orbital parameters
- Reference system: Geocentric
- Regime: Low Earth
- Epoch: Planned

ArduSat is an Arduino based nanosatellite, based on the CubeSat standard. It contains a set of Arduino boards and sensors. The general public will be allowed to use these Arduinos and sensors for their own creative purposes while they are in space.

ArduSat is created by NanoSatisfi LLC, an aerospace company which in the words of Phil Plait has "the goal to democratize access to space" and was founded by 4 graduate students from the International Space University in 2012.

ArduSat is the first satellite which will provide such open access to the general public to space. It is one of several crowdfunded satellites launched during the 2010s. Currently the project evolved to the company Because Learning.

== Timeline of the project ==
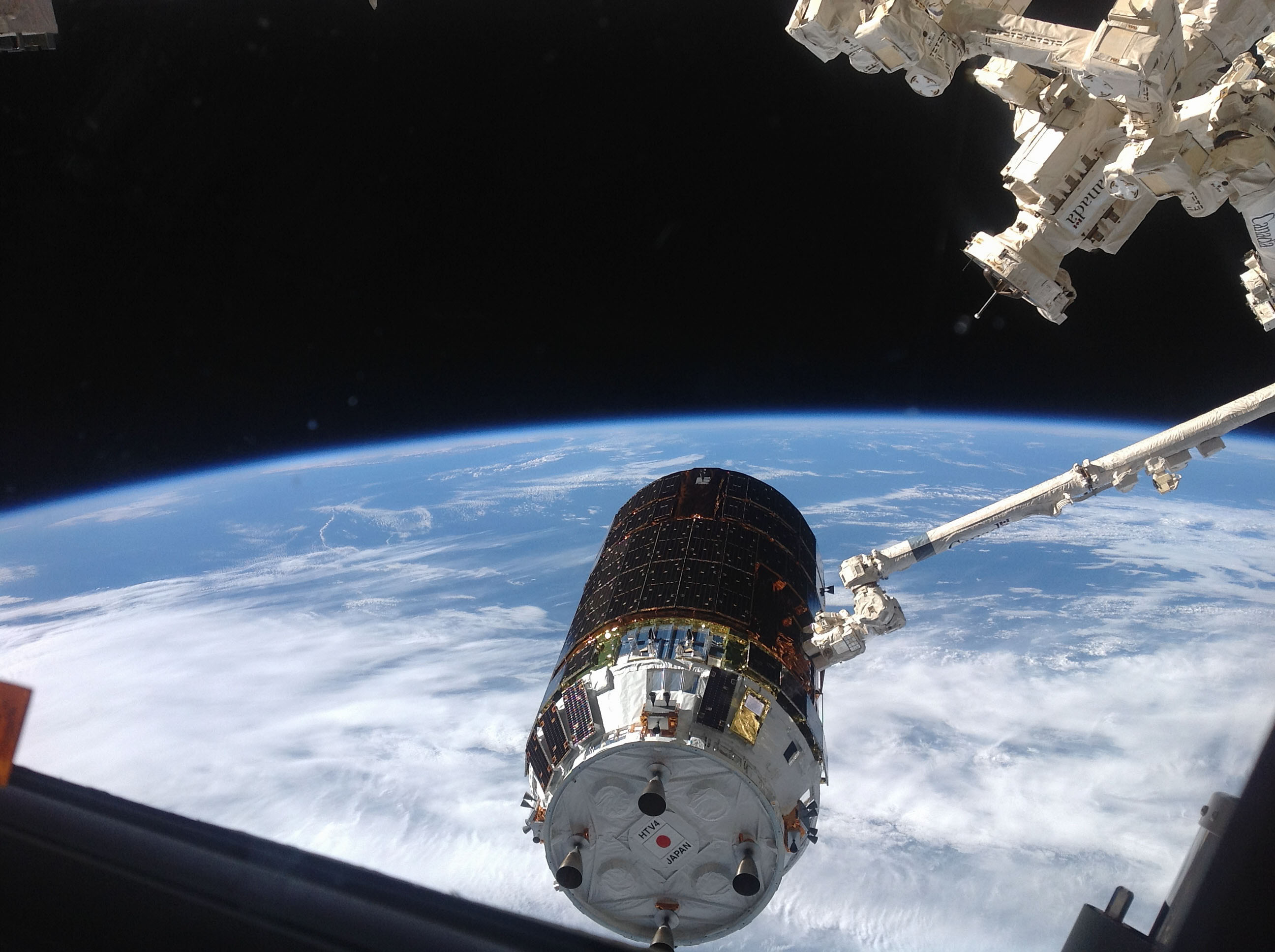
9 August 2013 – The International Space Station's Canadarm2 grapples the unpiloted Japanese "Kounotori" H2 Transfer Vehicle-4 (HTV-4) as it approaches the station, carrying ArduSat-1 and ArduSat-X among 3.6 tons of science experiments.

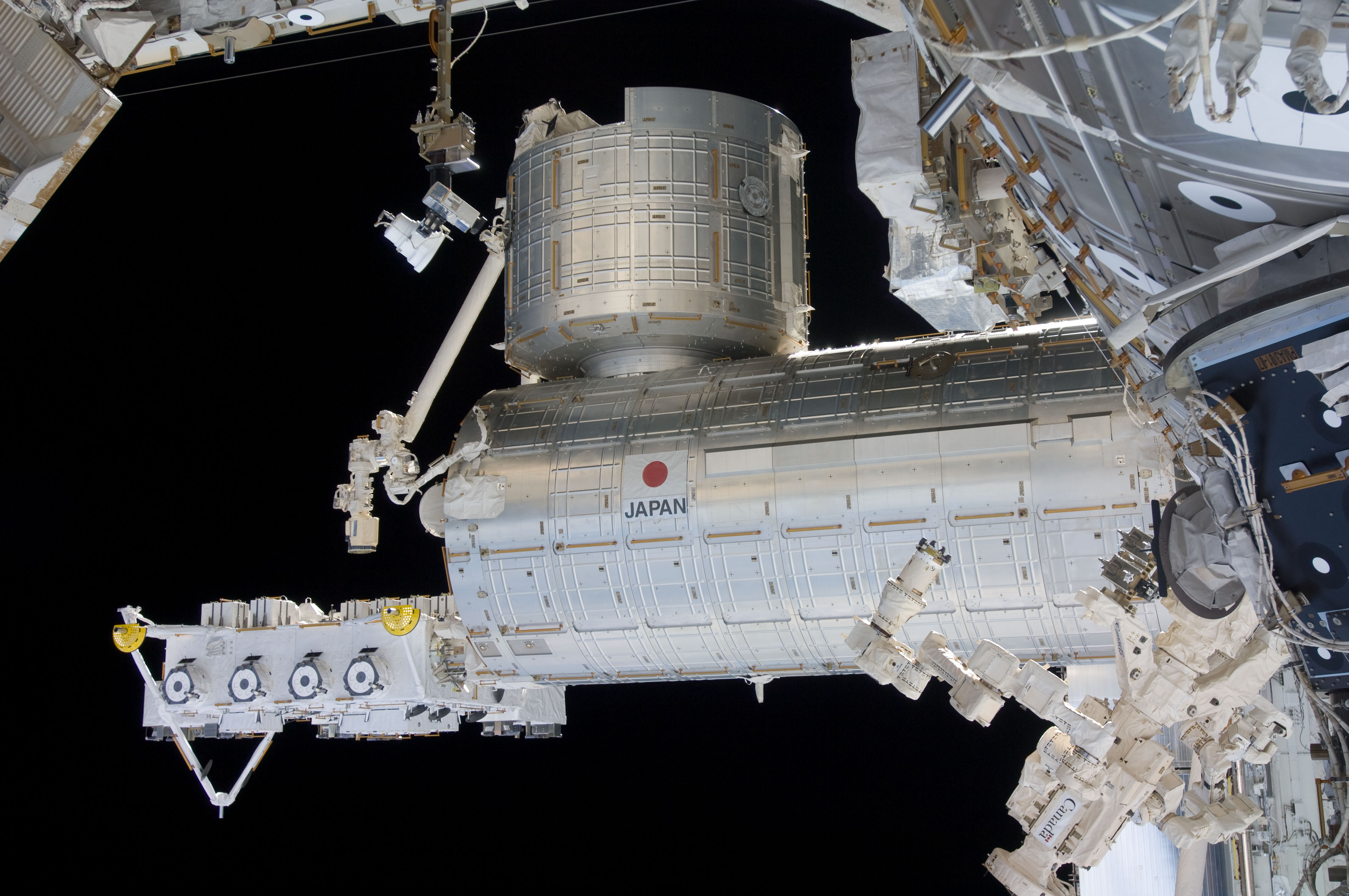
The Japanese Experiment Module Kibo laboratory and Exposed Facility, from which the CubeSats are launched via the ISS.

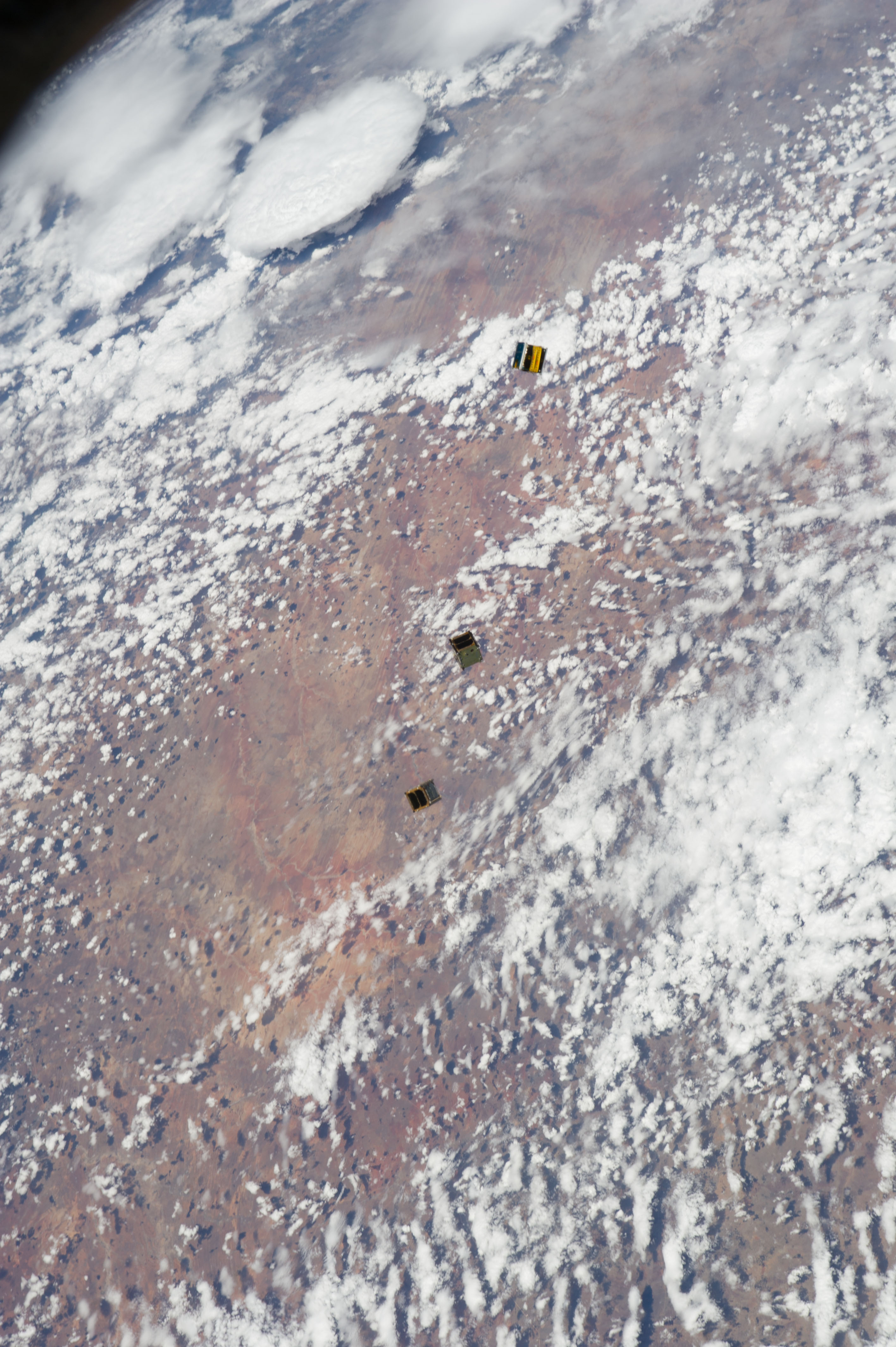
ArduSat-1, ArduSat-X and PicoDragon photographed from the ISS after their launch on 19 November 2013

Date	Event
15 June 2012	Launch of the ArduSat crowdfunding campaign on KickStarter. The goal was to obtain $35000 in funding.
15 July 2012	After 30 days of campaign, the project obtained a total pledge of $106330, from 676 "backers".
August 2012	Design of the ArduSat payload prototype.
27 October 2012	High-altitude test of the ArduSat payload prototype. "The ArduSat payload prototype was carried to 85,000 feet on a high-altitude balloon. During the flight, which took a little over two hours, the payload ran sample programs, ran tests on the sensors, and even snapped some pictures in the upper stratosphere."
20 November 2012	An agreement is signed between NanoSatisfi and NanoRacks for the deployment of the first two small satellites under the ArduSat program via NASA and JAXA, one in summer 2013, the other in fall 2013. That makes ArduSat "the first U.S. Commercial Satellite Deployment from the International Space Station".
December 2012	Design of "an engineering model of the satellite with flight-hardware equivalent components".
20–21 April 2013	ArduSat is placed as a challenge in NASA's International Space Apps Challenge. The objective of the challenge is to extend the functionality of the ArduSat platform, presented as "an open satellite platform offering on-demand access to Space". 22 projects were submitted to the ArduSat Challenge.
14 May 2013	Release of the first version of the ArduSatSDK on GitHub. This SDK is made available for the general public to propose and develop experiments for the ArduSat platform.
May–July 2013	Assembly and testing of the final version of ArduSat-1 and ArduSat-X.
3 August 2013	Launch of the ArduSat-1 and ArduSat-X aboard Kounotori 4 by the H-IIB Launch Vehicle No. 4 from Y2 in Japan, at 19:48:46 UTC
9 August 2013	The Kounotori 4 (HTV-4) is captured by the ISS' robotic arm Canadarm 2 at 11:22 UTC, led towards a ready-to-latch position on the earth-facing port of the Harmony node, and finally installed on its berthing port at 18:38 UTC.
30 Aug – 3 September 2013	Along with the cargo contained in the HTV-4 Pressurized Logistics Carrier (PLC), ArduSat-1 and ArduSat-X are transferred into the ISS.
15 November 2013	Flight Engineer Mike Hopkins installs the Japanese Experiment Module Small Satellite Orbital Deployer on the Multi-Purpose Experiment Platform.
19 November 2013	ArduSat-1 and ArduSat-X are launched from the Kibo Experiment Module's Exposed Facility, (along with the PicoDragon CubeSat). Flight Engineer Koichi Wakata uses the lab's airlock table to pass the Multi-Purpose Experiment Platform outside to Kibo's Exposed Facility. The Japanese robotic arm then unberths the platform from the Small Fine Arm airlock attach mechanism and maneuvers it into position to release the satellites.
15 April 2014	ArduSat X re-entered the atmosphere.
16 April 2014	ArduSat 1 re-entered the atmosphere.

== Technical features ==
=== ArduSat-1 and ArduSat-X ===
The ArduSat project currently consists in two identical satellites: ArduSat-1 and ArduSat-X.

Category	Specifications
General Architecture	1U CubeSat: the satellites implement the standard 10×10×10 cm basic CubeSat architecture.
Computing features	Arduino-based: The ArduSat is equipped with 16 processor nodes (ATmega328P) and 1 supervisor node (ATmega2561) (see for features). The processor nodes are dedicated to the computing of the experiments (each on one node); the supervisor uploads the code to the processor nodes.
Sensors	The Arduino processors may sample data from the following sensors: one digital 3-axis magnetometer (MAG3110); one digital 3-axis gyroscope (ITG-3200); one 3-axis accelerometer (ADXL345); one infrared temperature sensor with a wide sensing range (MLX90614); four digital temperature sensors (TMP102): 2 in the payload, 2 on the bottomplate; two luminosity sensor (TSL2561) covering both infrared and visible light: 1 on the bottomplate camera, 1 on the bottomplate slit; two geiger counter tubes (LND 716); one optical spectrometer (Spectruino); one 1.3MP camera (C439)
Coding	The experiments for ArduSat are developed in C/C++ for AVR/Arduino, using the ArduSatSDK.
Communication	ArduSat is equipped with a half-duplex UHF transceiver, operating in the 435–438 MHz amateur radio satellite band. It implements Forward Error Correction (FEC) and Viterbi coding based on the CCSDS standards.: ArduSat-1: 437.325 MHz 9k6 MSK CCSDS downlink; ArduSat-X: 437.345 MHz 9k6 MSK CCSDS downlink; Both satellites have a Morse beacon (FM-modulated 800 Hz tones) that is transmitted at 20 WPM every two or three minutes on 437.000 MHz. The beacon will be structured in the following format: ArduSat-1 beacon: Battery voltage (uint16_t), RX_counter (number of received valid data packets, uint32_t), TX_counter (number of sent valid data packets, uint32_t), "WG9XFC-1″; ArduSat-X beacon: Battery voltage (uint16_t), RX_counter (number of received valid data packets, uint32_t), TX_counter (number of sent valid data packets, uint32_t), "WG9XFC-X"

== See also ==
- 2013 in spaceflight
