= Vietnam Academy of Science and Technology =

Research institute in Vietnam

- Viện Hàn lâm Khoa học và Công nghệ Việt Nam
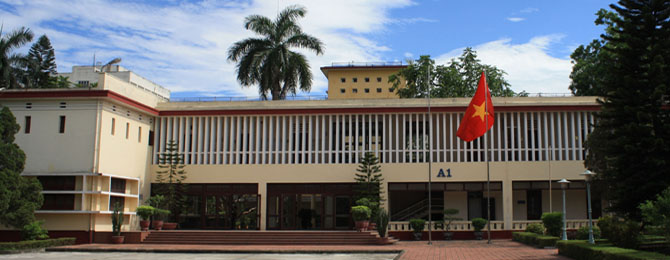
- VAST's headquarters building
- Former name: Vietnam Academy of Science
- Type: Institute of technology
- Established: 20 May 1975
- Founder: Government of Vietnam
- Parent institution: Central Committee of the Communist Party of Vietnam
- Affiliations: Vietnam National Space Center
- Chairman: Châu Văn Minh
- Location: Hanoi, Vietnam
- Nickname: VAST
- Website: http://www.vast.gov.vn/

The Vietnam Academy of Science and Technology (VAST; Vietnamese: Viện Hàn lâm Khoa học và Công nghệ Việt Nam) is the largest and most prominent research institute in Vietnam. It was founded on 20 May 1975 as the Vietnam Academy of Science, and subsequently assumed its current name in 2008. Its infrastructure spans Hanoi, Ho Chi Minh City, Hải Phòng, Nha Trang, Đà Lạt, and Huế.

== History ==
In March 2010, the VAST launched a peer-reviewed open access journal, Advances in Natural Sciences: Nanoscience and Nanotechnology (ANSN). The journal is jointly published with IOP Publishing. From 2026, VAST was transferred to the Central Committee of the Communist Party of Vietnam from its previous Government jurisdiction.

== Vietnam National Space Center ==
Vietnam National Space Center (VNSC; Vietnamese: Trung tâm Vũ trụ Việt Nam, lit. 'Vietnam Space Center'), originally organized and known as the Vietnam National Satellite Center (Trung tâm Vệ tinh Quốc gia - TTVTQG) until July 2017, was founded as a VAST research center on 16 September 2011 to implement space and satellite projects for the government of Vietnam, and is de facto the country's national space agency. The center is financially and technically assisted by Japan, citing JAXA as a top partner.
