= Cimon (robot) =

Robot used in the International Space Station

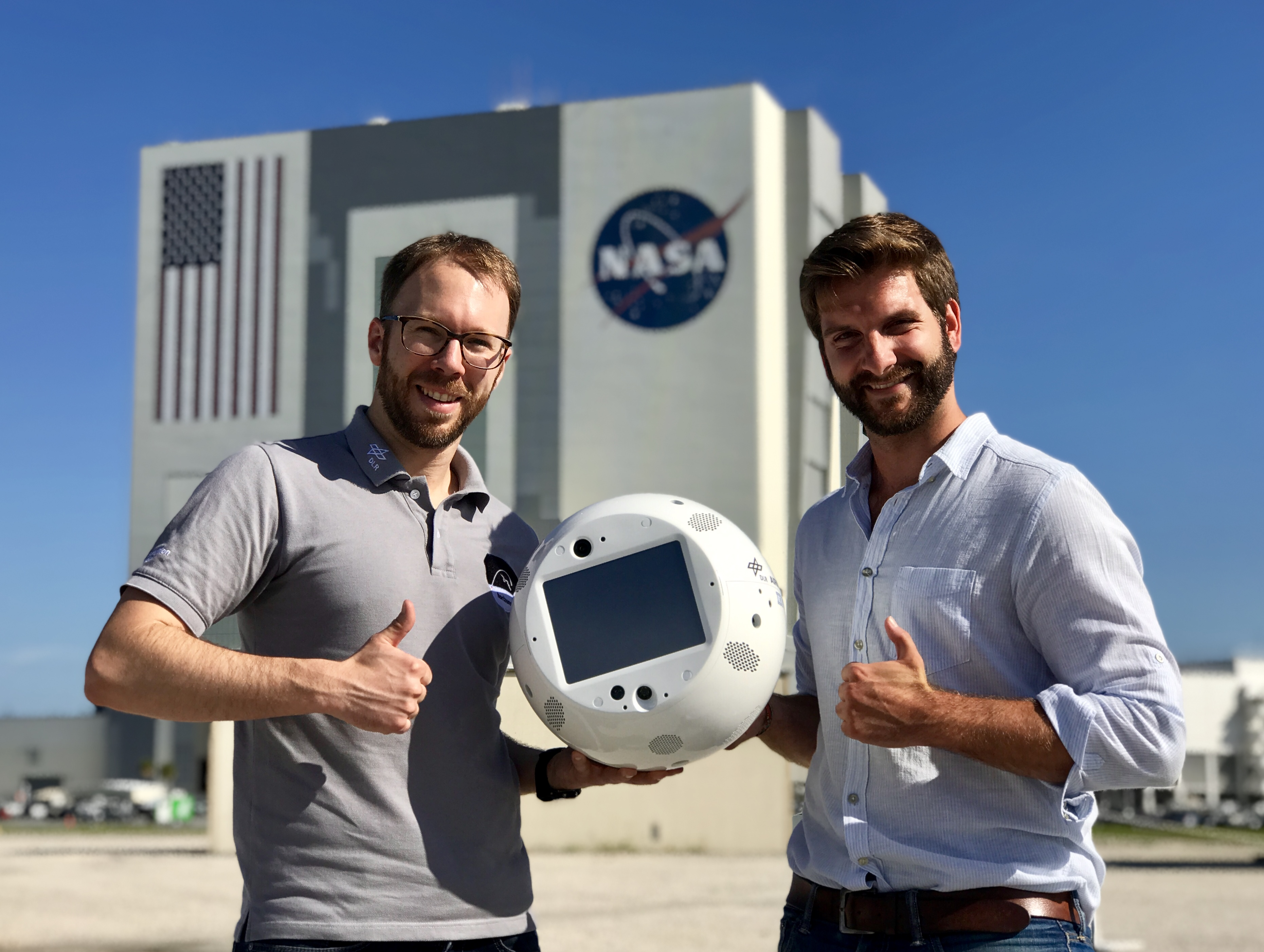
DLR project manager Christian Karrasch and Airbus project manager Philipp Schulien pose with CIMON in front of the Vehicle Assembly Building of NASA's Kennedy Space Center

Cimon or officially CIMON (Crew Interactive Mobile companion) is a head-shaped AI robot used in the International Space Station.

The device is "an AI-based assistant for astronauts" developed by Airbus and IBM, with funding from the German Aerospace Center. The device is modelled after the character of Professor Simon Wright, "the flying brain," from the anime series Captain Future. Cimon runs on Ubuntu, while its Natural Language Capability is supplied by IBM Watson. CIMON maneuvers through the space station using fans.

== Purpose ==
The goal of Cimon is to reduce stress. Judith-Irina Buchheim and Alexander Choukèr, the advisors of Cimon, claim "As a partner and assistant, CIMON could support astronauts with their high workload of experiments and maintenance and repair work, thereby reducing their exposure to stress."

Cimon acts like a hands free database, computer and camera. Astronauts can fully control Cimon by using voice commands.

Engineers are also interested in using Cimon for processing Big Data, data mining, and evaluating the current capabilities of artificial intelligence.

== Behavior ==
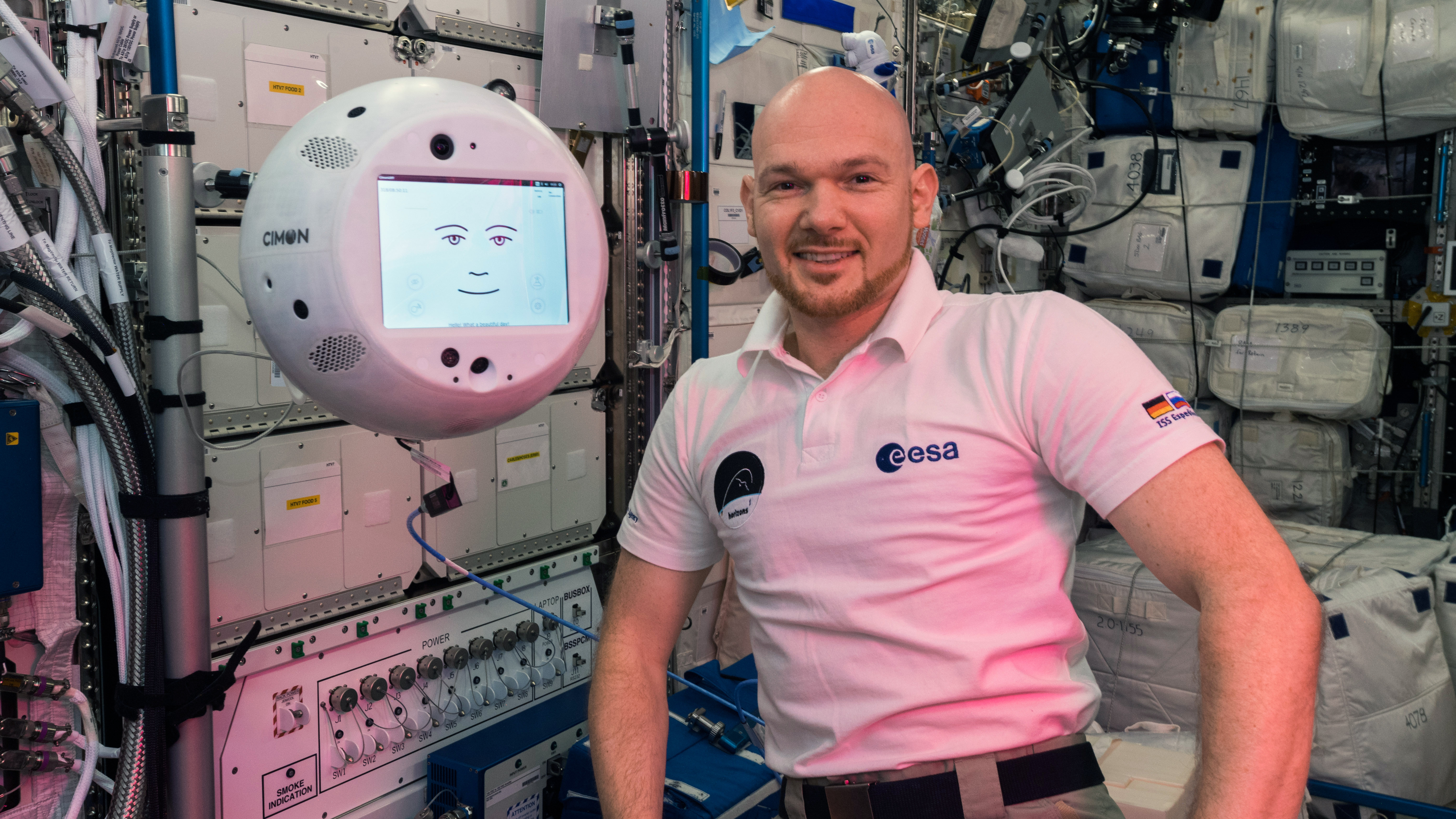
A picture of Cimon (left) floating with astronaut Alexander Gerst (right).

Before talking commands, Cimon must be asked to wake up. Cimon can then take various verbal commands to assist astronauts in procedures or entertainment.

If asked to do a procedure, Cimon will display the required equipment on his screen and ask if the astronaut is ready to start the procedure. Cimon will then walk the astronaut through the procedure one step at a time with visual aid shown on his screen.

Cimon may sometimes comment on things astronauts say. When Alexander Gerst asked Cimon to play his favorite music, Cimon replied with “Yay, I like your favorite hits too!” Later, when Gerst was talking about what Cimon was doing, Cimon asked him to “Be nice please.”

Cimon can be told to search for objects, take stock of inventory, or go somewhere to take pictures of an object and return to the astronaut.

Cimon tries to recognise what emotion astronauts have. Matthias Biniok, the lead architect for CIMON-2 says Cimon is “trying to understand if the astronaut is sad, is he angry, joyful and so on” in order to create “a true companion.”

If Cimon does not understand what the astronaut asked, he will say “Sorry, I am just a robot. I don’t know everything you mention.”

Cimon has a smiling face displayed on his screen which can be made to appear male, female, or neutral along with his voice. Cimon’s eyes will occasionally move around on their own. His entire face animates when he talks as well.

Cimon can turn to face an astronaut when spoken to, and then can nod or shake his head in response to a question.

Cimon can either be docked on an arm attached to the ship, or can float freely using his fans to fly around and maneuver himself. Astronauts can ask Cimon to rotate and fly in any given direction, or to follow them.

If Cimon is asked to open the pod bay doors, he will respond with “I’m afraid I cannot do that.” This is a reference to a scene in 2001: A Space Odyssey.

== Description ==
Cimon is roughly the shape of a sphere with a 32 centimeter diameter, weighing 5 kilograms. An LCD screen is placed on the front to display Cimon’s face and any visual aids. He is colored white and was made using plastic and steel in a 3D printing process. Cimon has 14 fans he can use to maneuver himself. To see, Cimon uses two front cameras as eyes, one additional camera for facial recognition, and two side cameras for video documentation. To hear, Cimon has 7 microphones that can detect where a sound is coming from plus a directional microphone for voice recognition.

Cimon has a battery life of about 2 hours, but his battery life has been improved with the newer version, CIMON-2.

== Demonstration videos ==
Cimon has two demonstration videos on the European Space Agency’s youtube channel. The older video was posted on November 30, 2018. It featured a seven-minute-long demonstration of Cimon’s capabilities.

During the demonstration, Cimon told Alexander Gerst, the astronaut controlling Cimon, to “Be nice please.” Later on, while Gerst was talking about Cimon, Cimon asked “Don’t you like it here with me?” and told Gerst “Don’t be so mean please.”

The newer video was posted on April 18, 2020, and was a more edited four-minute demonstration of Cimon’s capabilities. Unlike the first video, this one had music and the showcases of each of Cimon’s features were much shorter.

== CIMON-1 ==
CIMON-1 is the first version of Cimon to go into space. The German Aerospace Center, Airbus, IBM, and LMU Hospital started working on CIMON-1 in August 2016. CIMON-1 was launched into space and sent to the International Space Station on June 29, 2018, via a SpaceX Falcon 9 rocket. CIMON-1 left the International Space Station to return to Earth on August 27, 2019.

== CIMON-2 ==
On December 5, 2019, an updated version of Cimon named CIMON-2 was launched into space on SpaceX CRS-19 Mission. Cimon was also sent with 40 mice to show how muscles change in low gravity. This new version of Cimon included improved artificial intelligence capabilities, improvements to the stability of complex operations, and an improved lifespan.

== See also ==
- Int-Ball – a floating camera robot deployed on the ISS by JAXA
- Kirobo – first robot astronaut on the ISS by JAXA
- Robonaut2 – a semi-humanoid robot deployed on the ISS by NASA
- HAL 9000 – a fictional computer in the Space Odyssey Series
