= Kirobo =

Japanese robot astronaut

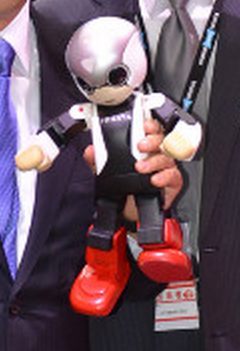
- Country: Japan
- Year of creation: 2013; 13 years ago
- Type: Robot astronaut
- Purpose: Robot—human interaction

Kirobo is Japan's first robot astronaut, developed by University of Tokyo and Tomotaka Takahashi, to accompany Koichi Wakata, the first Japanese commander of the International Space Station. Kirobo arrived on the ISS on August 10, 2013, on JAXA's H-II Transfer Vehicle Kounotori 4, an unmanned resupply spacecraft launched August 4, 2013 from Japan's Tanegashima Space Center. A twin to Kirobo, named Mirata, was created with the same characteristics, and stayed on Earth as a backup crew member. The word "kirobo" itself is a portmanteau of kibō (希望), which means "hope" in Japanese, and the word robo (ロボ), used as a generic short word for any robot.

== Development ==
Kirobo was developed by a collaborative effort between Dentsu, the University of Tokyo's Research Center for Advanced Science and Technology, Robo Garage, Toyota, and JAXA (Japan Aerospace Exploration Agency). The University of Tokyo and Robo Garage worked on the robot hardware and motion generation, Toyota created the voice recognition function and Dentsu created the conversation content and managed the project. VoiceText of Hoya Service provided speech synthesis.

== Features ==
Kirobo is approximately 34 cm (13 in) tall, 18 cm (7.1 in) wide and 15 cm (5.9 in) deep. It weighs about 1 kilogram (2.2 lb) and speaks Japanese.

The robot's capabilities include voice and speech recognition, natural language processing, speech synthesis and telecommunications, as well as facial recognition and video recording. Kirobo is specially designed to navigate zero-gravity environments and will assist Commander Wakata in various experiments. Its main goal is to see how well robots and humans can interact, hopefully leading the way to robots taking more active roles in assisting astronauts on missions.

== World records ==
Kirobo set two Guinness World Records after it returned to Japan, following an 18-month stay on board the International Space Station:

- First companion robot in space
- Highest altitude for a robot to have a conversation

== See also ==
- CIMON, floating robot deployed on the ISS by Airbus,
- Robonaut
- Robonaut2, semi-humanoid robot deployed on the ISS by NASA
