= GOES-17 =

NOAA weather satellite

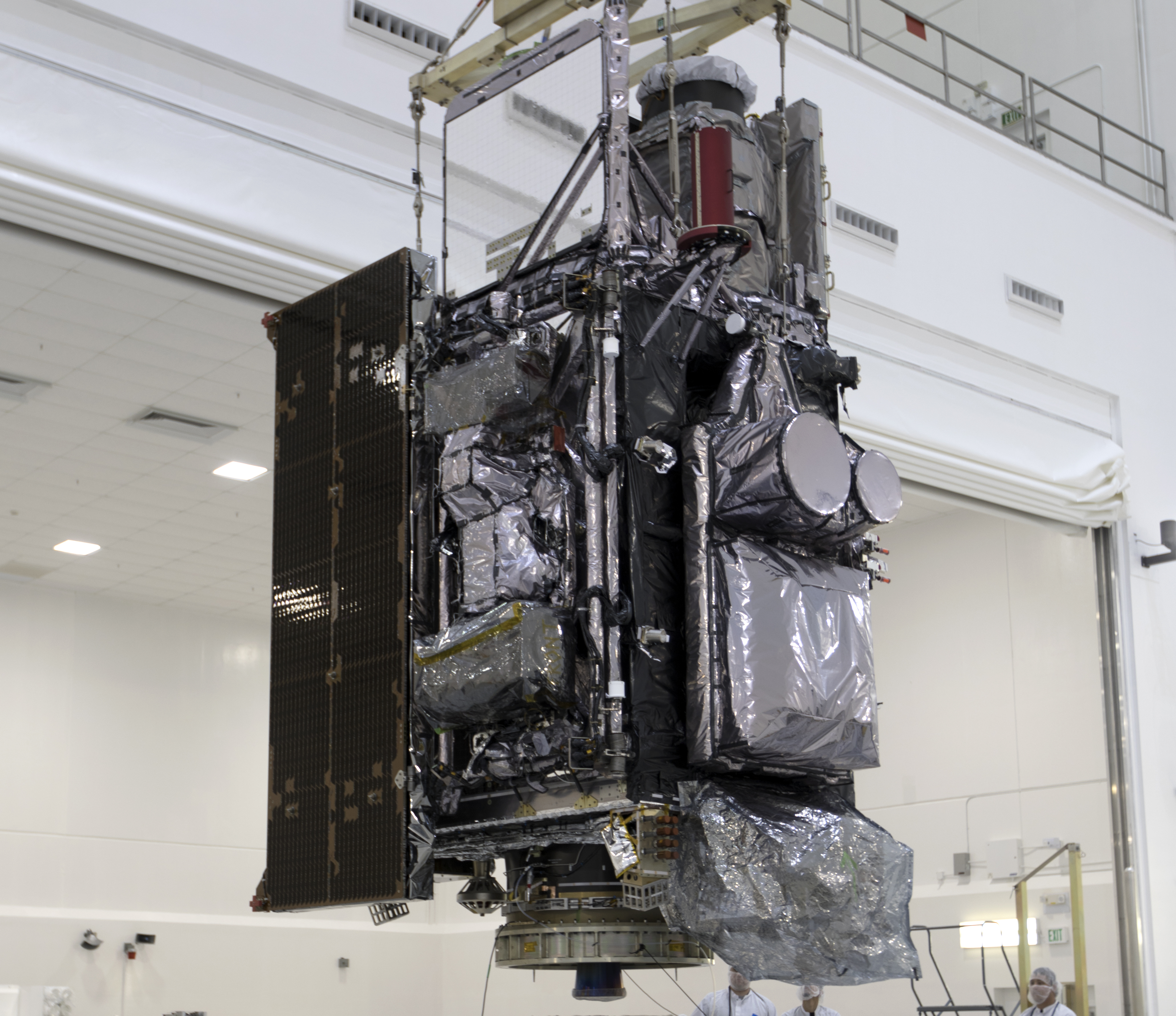
- Processing of GOES-S at Astrotech Space Operations Facility
- Names: GOES-S
- Mission type: Weather and meteorology
- Operator: NOAA / NASA
- COSPAR ID: 2018-022A
- SATCAT no.: 43226
- Website: goes-r.gov
- Mission duration: 15 years (planned); 8 years, 2 months, 4 days (elapsed)

Spacecraft properties
- Spacecraft type: GOES-R Series
- Bus: A2100A
- Manufacturer: Lockheed Martin
- Launch mass: 5,192 kg (11,446 lb)
- Dry mass: 2,857 kg (6,299 lb)
- Dimensions: 6.1 × 5.6 × 3.9 m (20 × 18 × 13 ft)
- Power: 4 kW

Start of mission
- Launch date: 1 March 2018, 22:02 UTC
- Rocket: Atlas V 541 (AV-077)
- Launch site: Cape Canaveral, SLC-41
- Contractor: United Launch Alliance
- Entered service: 12 February 2019

Orbital parameters
- Reference system: Geocentric orbit
- Regime: Geostationary orbit
- Longitude: 137.3° West
- Slot: GOES-West
Instruments
- ABI: Advanced Baseline Imager
- GLM: Geostationary Lightning Mapper
- EXIS: Extreme Ultraviolet and X-ray Irradiance Sensors
- SUVI: Solar Ultraviolet Imager
- MAG: Magnetometer
- SEISS: Space Environment In-Situ Suite
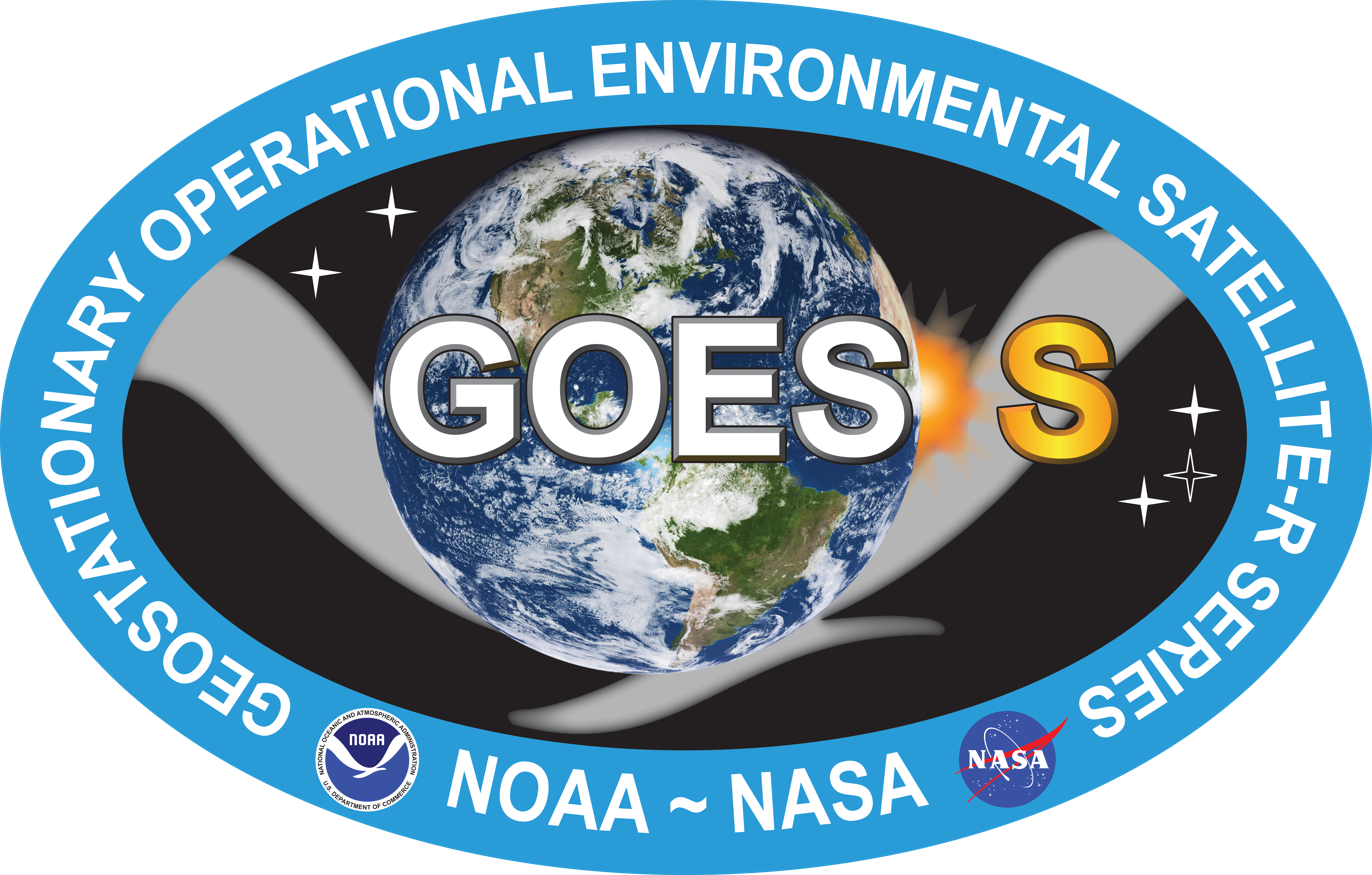
- GOES-S insignia mission GOES-R Series

GOES-17 (designated pre-launch as GOES-S) is an environmental satellite operated by the National Oceanic and Atmospheric Administration (NOAA). The satellite is second in the four-satellite GOES-R series (GOES-16, -17, -18, and -19). GOES-17 supports the Geostationary Operational Environmental Satellite (GOES) system, providing multi-spectral imaging for weather forecasts and meteorological and environmental research. The satellite was built by Lockheed Martin, based on the A2100A platform, and expected to have a useful life of 15 years (10 years operational after five years of standby as an on-orbit replacement). GOES-17 is intended to deliver high-resolution visible and infrared imagery and lightning observations of more than half the globe.

The satellite was launched on 1 March 2018 and reached geostationary orbit on 12 March 2018. In May 2018, during the satellite's testing phase after launch, a problem was discovered with its primary instrument, the Advanced Baseline Imager (see Malfunctions, below). GOES-17 became operational as GOES-West on 12 February 2019. In June 2021, NOAA announced that due to the cooling problem with the satellite's main imager, GOES-T would replace the GOES-17 in an operational role "as soon as possible". GOES-T launched on March 1, 2022.

== Operations ==
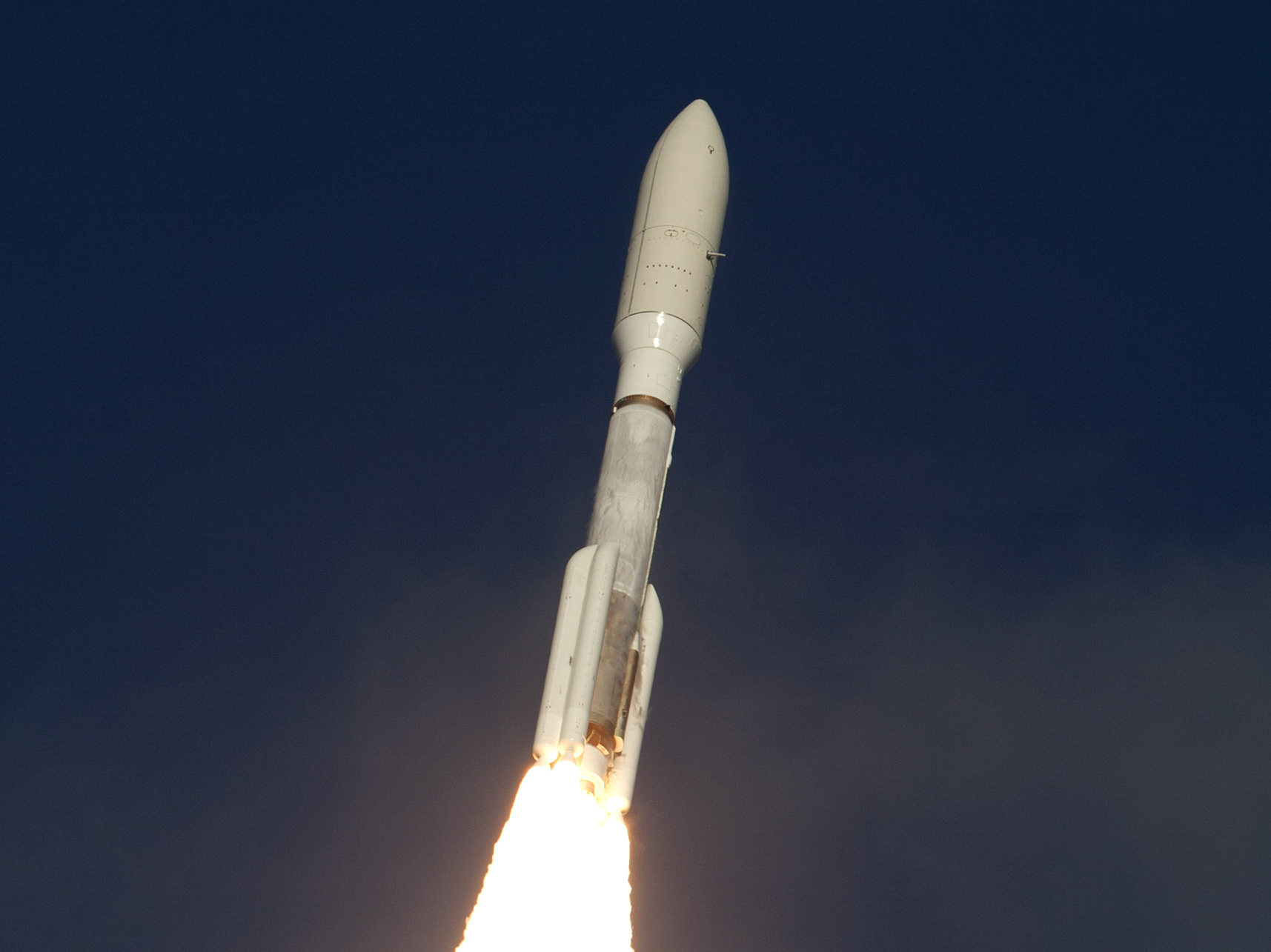
Launch of GOES-S aboard an Atlas V

The satellite was launched into space on 1 March 2018 by an Atlas V (541) launch vehicle from Cape Canaveral Air Force Station, Florida. It had a launch mass of 5,192 kg (11,446 lb). On 12 March 2019, GOES-17 joined GOES-16 (launched in 2016) in geostationary orbit at 35,700 km (22,200 mi) above Earth.

On 24 October 2018, GOES-17 began a 20-day, 2.5°/day westward drift maneuver from its checkout position of 89.5° West longitude to its operational position of 137.2° West. During the drift maneuver, all instruments except for the magnetometer were disabled. Meanwhile, GOES-15 began an eastward drift maneuver on 29 October 2018 to 128° West, with all of its sensors still functioning. It reached its new location on 7 November 2018. GOES-17 began transmitting its first images on 13 November 2018. The first high-definition images transmitted were of Alaska, Hawaii, and the Pacific Ocean. GOES-15's drift was intended to provide additional separation from GOES-17 to prevent communication interference. GOES-17 reached its assigned longitude 13 November 2018 and began additional testing. GOES-17 was declared operational on 12 February 2019. Both GOES-17 and GOES-15 operated in tandem through early 2020 to allow assessment of GOES-17's performance as GOES-West. On 2 March 2020, GOES-15 was deactivated and moved to a storage orbit with plans to re-activate it in August 2020 to supplement GOES-17 operations due to the known flaws with the Advanced Baseline Imager.

=== Malfunctions ===
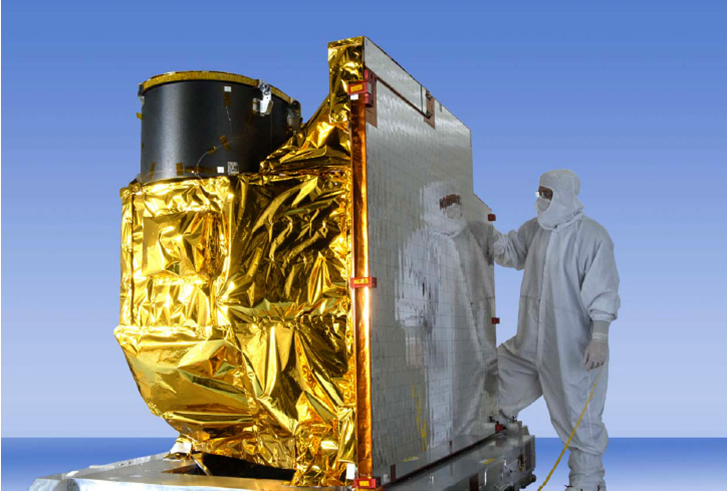
The GOES-16 Advanced Baseline Imager before satellite integration

On 23 May 2018, NOAA announced that there were problems with the cooling system of the Advanced Baseline Imager. Due to the cooling failure, infrared and near-infrared imaging was only possible 12 hours per day. The issue affects 13 of the infrared and near-infrared channels on the instrument. No other sensors of the satellite are affected.

During a media conference call on 24 July 2018, the problem component was identified as the loop heat pipe, which transports heat from the cryocooler and ABI to radiators. The degraded performance of this component means the ABI gets hotter than intended, which lowers the sensitivity of the infrared sensors. In order to work properly, the sensors need to be cooled to varying degrees depending on what wavelength they observe; the sensors operating in the longest wavelengths need to be kept as low as −212.8 °C (−351.0 °F; 60.3 K) in order to reduce thermal noise. (Note: The sensor is sensitive to temperatures similar to its (uncooled) operating temperature. Essentially, the sensor is detecting itself, which significantly raises the noise floor and makes it difficult to discriminate legitimate signals.)

The GOES-R System program director, Pam Sullivan, said on the conference call that preliminary projections suggested that via thermal mitigation measures such as changing the spacecraft alignment, ABI performance could be significantly improved, depending on the season. The orbit of the spacecraft brings the ABI into full sunlight more often around the equinoxes, resulting in more solar radiation being absorbed by the ABI and degrading the performance of the infrared channels, with projections indicating that 10 of the 16 channels will be available 24 hours a day, with the other six channels available for "most of the day, to varying degrees, depending on their wavelength. Around the solstices, the orbit alignment is such that the ABI receives less direct sunlight, and it is projected that 13 of the 16 channels will be available 24 hours a day with the other three channels available 20 or more hours per day.

The loop heat pipe (LHP) was manufactured by Orbital ATK (now owned by Northrop Grumman). On 2 October 2018, NOAA and NASA appointed a five-member Mishap Investigation Board to further examine the issue. NOAA worked with Northrop Grumman to identify exactly what caused the loop heat pipe to fail, using engineering-grade copies of the spacecraft components for testing. Possible causes mentioned in the conference call included debris or foreign objects inside the heat pipe, or an improper amount of propylene coolant. The final conclusion of the independent failure review team's investigation, released on 3 October 2018, was that "the most likely cause of the thermal performance issue is foreign object debris (FOD) blocking the flow of the coolant in the loop heat pipes. A series of ground-based tests introducing FOD into test pipes support FOD as the most likely cause. A second potential cause, mechanical failure, was investigated and deemed unlikely. The failure review team recommended changes to the ABI radiators on the subsequent GOES-R Series satellites, including a simpler hardware configuration and the use of ammonia as the coolant rather than propylene. The system was redesigned, and a Critical Design Review (CDR), originally scheduled for December 2018 but delayed as a result of a government shutdown, was eventually held on 7–8 February 2019.

Various software workarounds were introduced in order to minimize the impact of the loop heat pipe (LHP) problem on GOES-17.

In October 2018, Lockheed Martin finished assembling the next unit of the GOES-R series, GOES-T, and was preparing to begin environmental testing of the completed satellite, when NOAA ordered the removal of the ABI to return to the manufacturer, Harris Corporation, for remanufacturing. (Note: The loop heat pipe was actually manufactured by Orbital-ATK, which is now a part of Northrop Grumman, while the Advanced Baseline Imager (ABI) was built by Exelis Inc., now a part of Harris Corp.) As a result, the scheduled May 2020 launch of GOES-T was delayed until March 1, 2022. The 2024 launch of GOES-U will probably not be delayed as a result of the redesign.

On 20 November 2018, a memory error occurred in the ABI which resulted from a software update for its cryocooler subsystem. This resulted in automated onboard safety checks shutting down the cryocooler. It was restored to operation on 25 November 2018, and engineers began working on a permanent software fix for deployment in January 2019.

On 15 August 2019, GOES-17 experienced a brief "spacecraft anomaly" from about 13:45 to 17:00 UTC. This anomaly prevented delivery of all bands and scenes.

== Objectives ==
NOAA's GOES-R Series of satellites is designed to improve the forecasts of weather, ocean, and environment by providing faster and more detailed data, real-time images of lightning, and advanced monitoring of solar activities and space weather. GOES-17 can collect three times more data at four times image resolution, and scan the planet five times faster than previous probes.

GOES-17 has the same instruments and capabilities as GOES-16 (currently serving as GOES-East), and will complement its work by scanning a different area of the world. GOES-17 is GOES-West when it moves to 137.2° West longitude and cover the west coast of the continental U.S., Hawaii, and much of the Pacific Ocean. These two satellites are expected to monitor most of the Western Hemisphere and detect natural phenomena and hazards in almost real time.

Its capabilities will allow better:

- fire track and intensity estimation
- detection of low cloud/fog
- tropical cyclone track and intensity forecasts
- monitoring of smoke and dust
- air quality warnings and alerts
- transportation safety and aviation route planning
- advanced monitoring of atmospheric river events that can cause flooding and mudslides

Along with GOES-16, these newly advanced satellites can give near-real-time updates on what is happening in the atmosphere across the United States.

== Instruments ==
The instrument suite of GOES-17 is identical to that of GOES-16. It includes:

=== Earth sensing ===
Earth as seen from GOES-17 on 20 May 2018

==== Advanced Baseline Imager (ABI) ====
The Advanced Baseline Imager (ABI) was built by Harris Corporation Space and Intelligence Systems (formerly ITT/Exelis) for the GOES-R line of satellites for imaging Earth's weather, climate and environment. Key subcontractors for the ABI instrument included BAE Systems, Babcock Incorporated, BEI Technologies, DRS Technologies, L-3 Communications SSG-Tinsley and Northrop Grumman Space Technology, and Orbital ATK. The imaging capabilities of the ABI are superior to previous imagers in several ways.

===== Spectral resolution =====
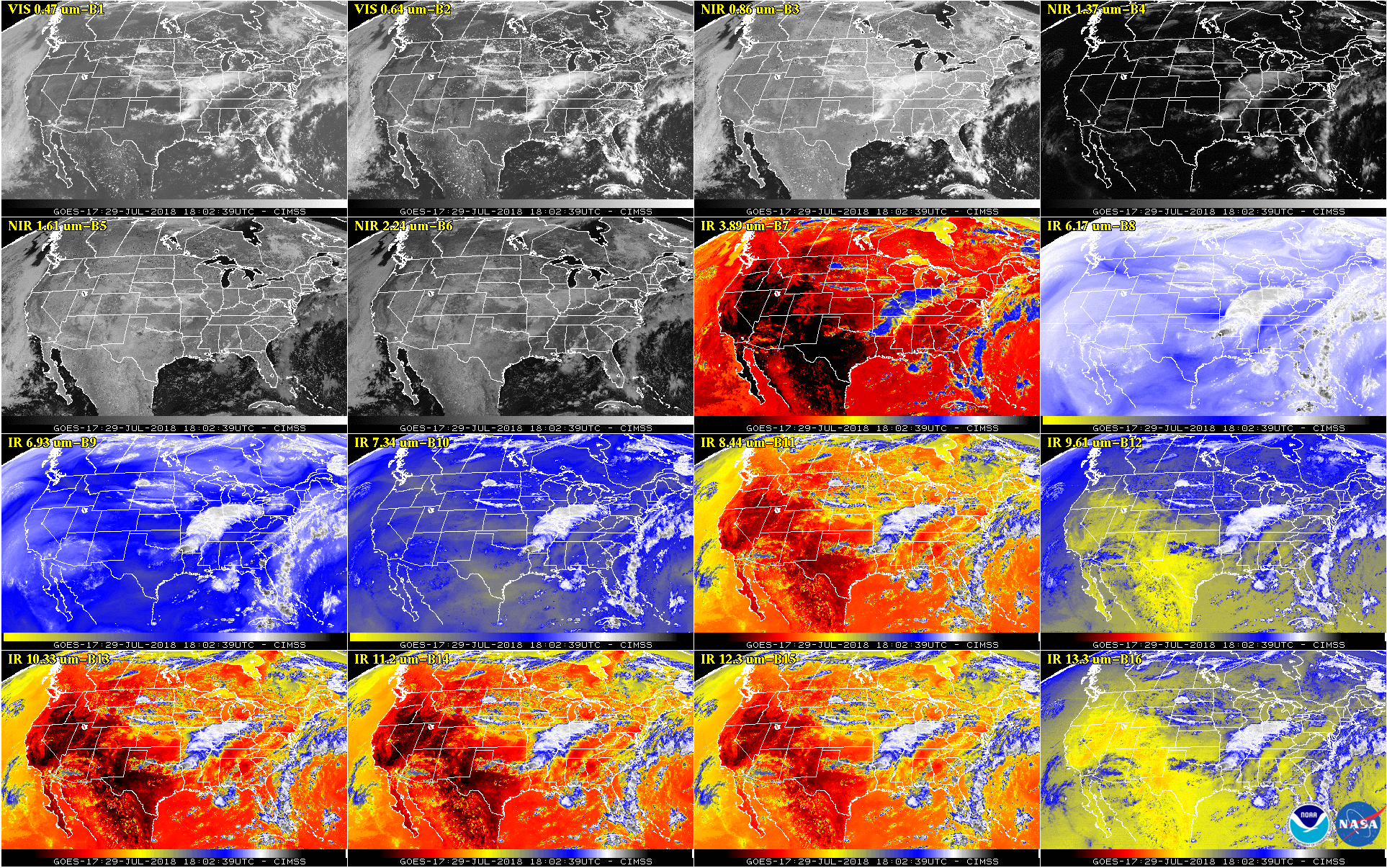
ABI images of North America across the 16 spectral bands

This instrument has 16 bands (11 more than the last GOES imager:)

2 Visible Bands:

- Band 1: 0.45–0.49 μm ("Blue")
- Band 2: 0.60–0.68 μm ("Red")

4 Near IR Bands:

- Band 3: 0.847–0.882 μm ("Veggie") (Note: This band is nicknamed "Veggie" because vegetation is highly reflective to infrared light at this wavelength. See red edge. It can be used as a proxy for a green channel in visible light, which the ABI lacks.)
- Band 4: 1.366–1.380 μm ("Cirrus")
- Band 5: 1.59–1.63 μm ("Snow/Ice")
- Band 6: 2.22–2.27 μm ("Cloud Particle Size")

10 other Infrared Bands:

- Band 7: 3.80–3.99 μm ("Shortwave Window")
- Band 8: 5.79–6.59 μm ("Upper-Level Tropospheric Water Vapor")
- Band 9: 6.72–7.14 μm ("Mid-Level Tropospheric Water Vapor")
- Band 10: 7.24–7.43 μm ("Lower-Level Tropospheric Water Vapor")
- Band 11: 8.23–8.66 μm ("Cloud-Top Phase")
- Band 12: 9.42–9.80 μm ("Ozone")
- Band 13: 10.18–10.48 μm ("Clean IR Longwave Window")
- Band 14: 10.82–11.60 μm ("IR Longwave Window")
- Band 15: 11.83–12.75 μm ("Dirty IR Longwave Window")
- Band 16: 12.99–13.56 μm ("CO_{2} Longwave Infrared")

===== Temporal resolution =====
The temporal resolution of ABI products changes depending on the type of image:

- Imaging of entire western hemisphere occurs every 5 to 15 minutes, while previously this was a scheduled event, with at most three photos per hour.
- Imaging of the continental United States once every 5 minutes, compared to one every 15 minutes in previous satellites
- One detailed image over some 1,000 by 1,000 km (620 by 620 mi) box every thirty seconds, a capability previous imagers did not have.

===== Spatial resolution =====
Spatial resolution will be dependent on what band is being used - band 2 is the highest resolution out of all channels, with a resolution of 500 m (1,600 ft). Channels 1, 3, and 5 will have a resolution of 1 km (0.6 mi), while all other bands in NIR/IR will have a resolution of 2 km (1.2 mi).

==== Geostationary Lightning Mapper (GLM) ====
The Geostationary Lightning Mapper (GLM) is used for measuring lightning (in-cloud and cloud-to-ground) activity. To do this, it considers a single channel in the NIR (777.4-nm) constantly, even during the day, to catch flashes from lightning.

The sensor has a 1372 × 1300 pixel CCD, with an 8–14 km (5.0–8.7 mi) spatial resolution (with the resolution decreasing near the edges of the field of view (FOV). The GLM has a frame interval of 2 milliseconds, meaning it considers the entire study area 500 times every second.

Development of the GLM was contracted to the Lockheed Martin Advanced Technology Center in Palo Alto, California.

=== Solar imaging ===
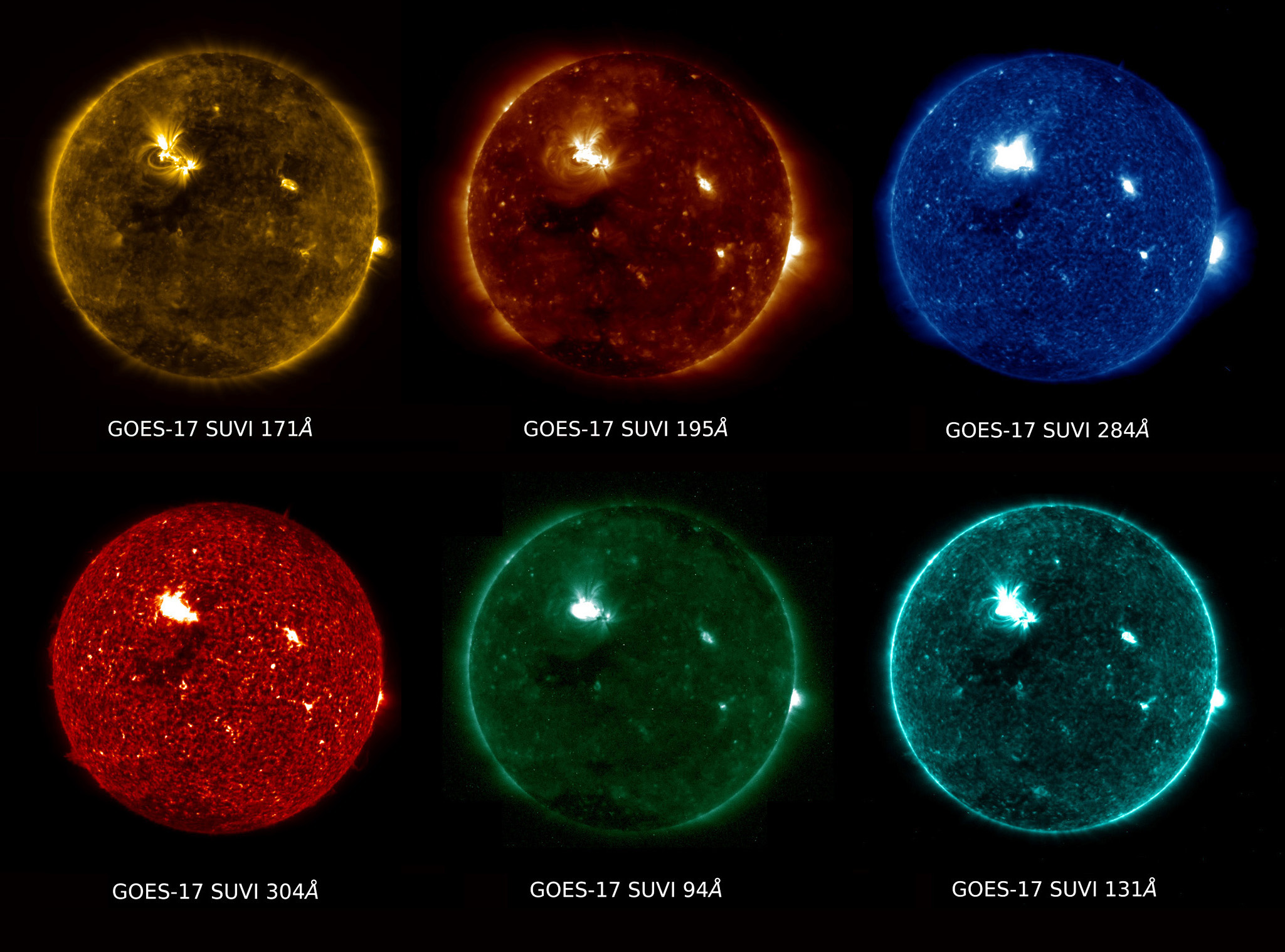
The Solar Ultraviolet Imager captures a solar flare on 28 May 2018 across different spectral bands.

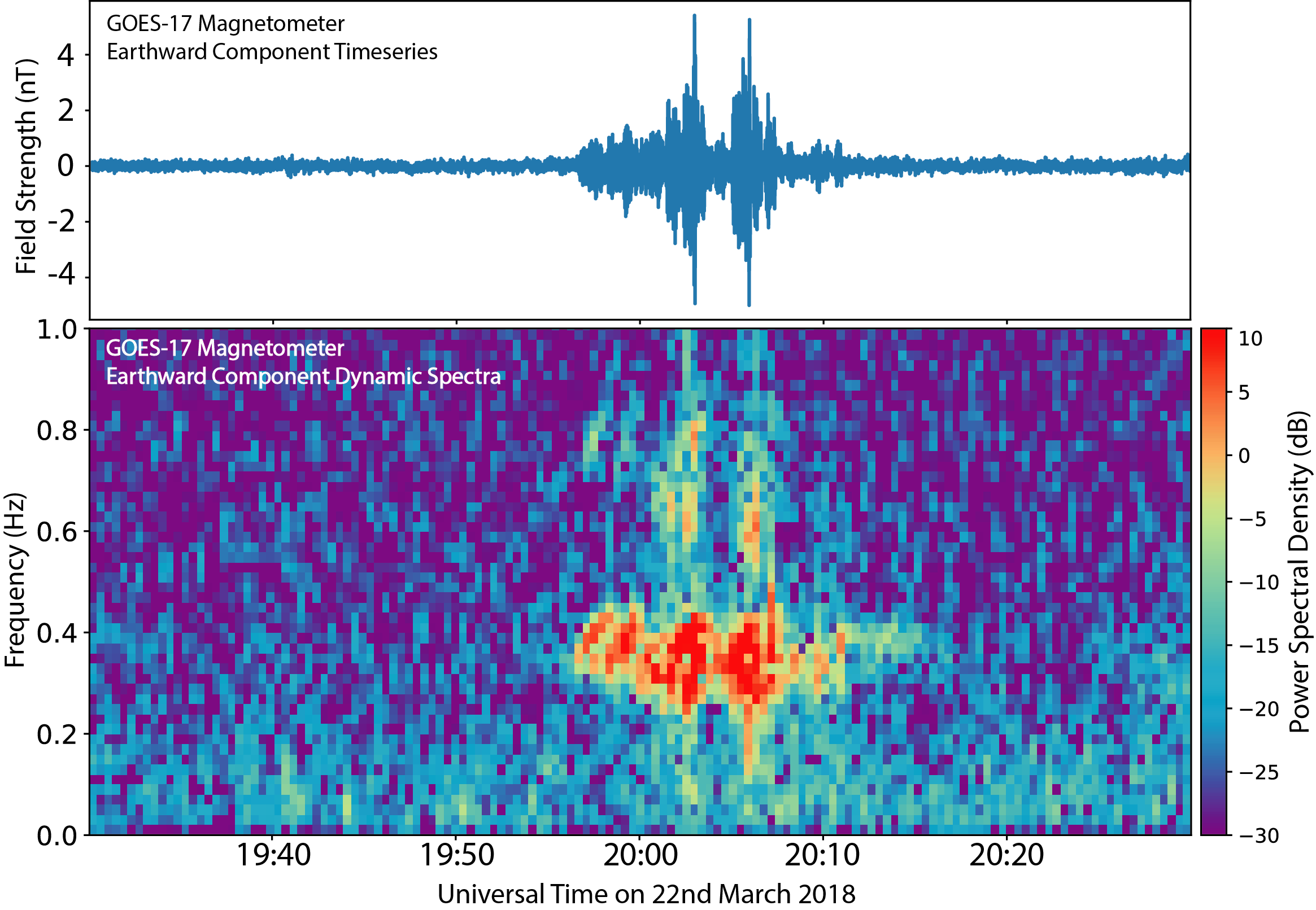
Magnetometer data showing the effects of plasma waves in 2018

- Solar Ultraviolet Imager (SUVI) for observing coronal holes, solar flares and coronal mass ejection source regions.
- Extreme Ultraviolet and X-ray Irradiance Sensors (EXIS) for monitoring solar irradiance in the upper atmosphere. It was built at the Laboratory for Atmospheric and Space Physics at Boulder, Colorado. It has three separate sensors: one for X-ray, one for extreme ultraviolet and a third one which is a combination of X-ray and extreme ultraviolet.
- The sensors aboard EXIS, XRS and EUVS, monitor solar flares in order to give warning of events strong enough to cause radio blackouts and both are used to make space weather predictions. More specifically, XRS monitors the X-ray variability from the Sun, and EUVS looks for short and long time scale variability in extreme-ultraviolet output from the Sun; both instruments intend to give a more clear picture of the Sun's varying influence on Earth's upper atmosphere.

=== Space environment measuring ===
- Space Environment In-Situ Suite (SEISS) for monitoring proton, electron and heavy ion fluxes in geostationary orbit
- Magnetometer (MAG) for the space environment magnetic field that controls charged particle dynamics in the outer region of the magnetosphere

=== Transponders ===
- The Geostationary Search and Rescue (GEOSAR) for relaying distress signals from users in difficulty to search and rescue centers
- Data Collection and Interrogation Service (DCIS) for data collection from in-situ Data Collection Platforms
