= GOES-19 =

NOAA weather satellite

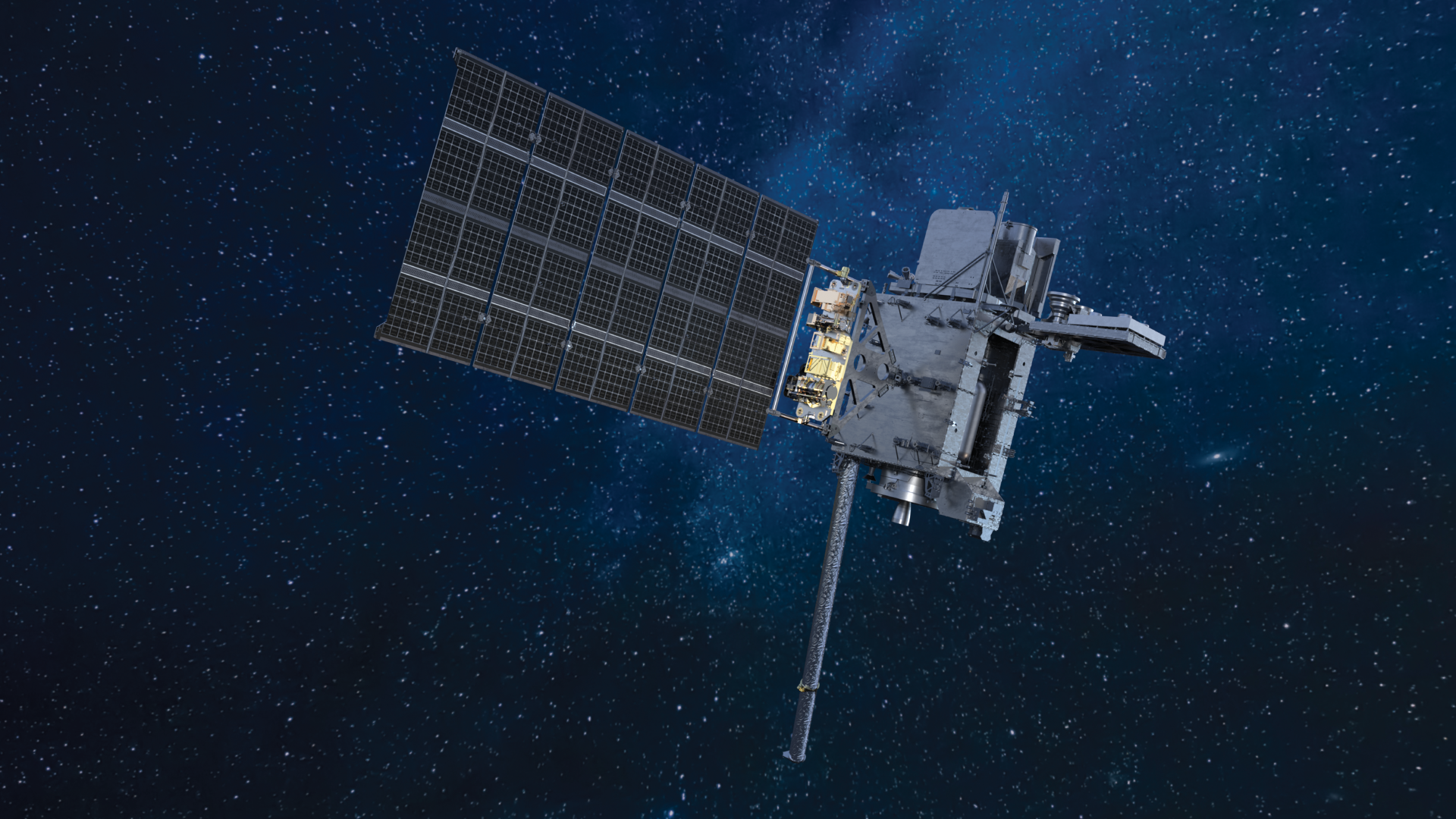
- Artistic rendering of GOES-U once deployed
- Names: Geostationary Operational Environmental Satellite-U
- Mission type: Earth weather forecasting
- Operator: NOAA / NASA
- COSPAR ID: 2024-119A
- SATCAT no.: 60133
- Mission duration: 15 years (planned); 752 days, 4 hours, 23 minutes (in progress)

Spacecraft properties
- Bus: A2100
- Manufacturer: Lockheed Martin
- Launch mass: 5,000 kg (11,023 lb)
- Dry mass: 2,925 kg (6,449 lb)

Start of mission
- Launch date: 25 June 2024, 21:26 UTC (5:26 pm EDT)
- Rocket: Falcon Heavy
- Launch site: Kennedy Space Center, LC-39A
- Contractor: SpaceX
- Entered service: 7 April 2025

Orbital parameters
- Reference system: Geocentric orbit
- Regime: Geostationary orbit
- Longitude: 75.2° west (planned)
- Semi-major axis: 41,845 km (26,001 mi)
- Eccentricity: 0.0045031
- Perigee altitude: 35,286.4 km (21,926.0 mi)
- Apogee altitude: 35,663.3 km (22,160.1 mi)
- Inclination: 0.1204°
- Period: 24 hours
- Epoch: July 12, 2024
- GOES-U mission insignia GOES Series

GOES-19 (designated GOES-U prior to reaching geostationary orbit) is a weather satellite, the fourth and last of the GOES-R series of satellites operated by the National Oceanic and Atmospheric Administration (NOAA). The GOES-R series will extend the availability of the Geostationary Operational Environmental Satellite (GOES) system until 2036. The satellite is built by Lockheed Martin, based on the A2100 platform. The satellite was placed into service as the GOES-East position and GOES-16 was stored as backup on April 7, 2025.

== Launch ==
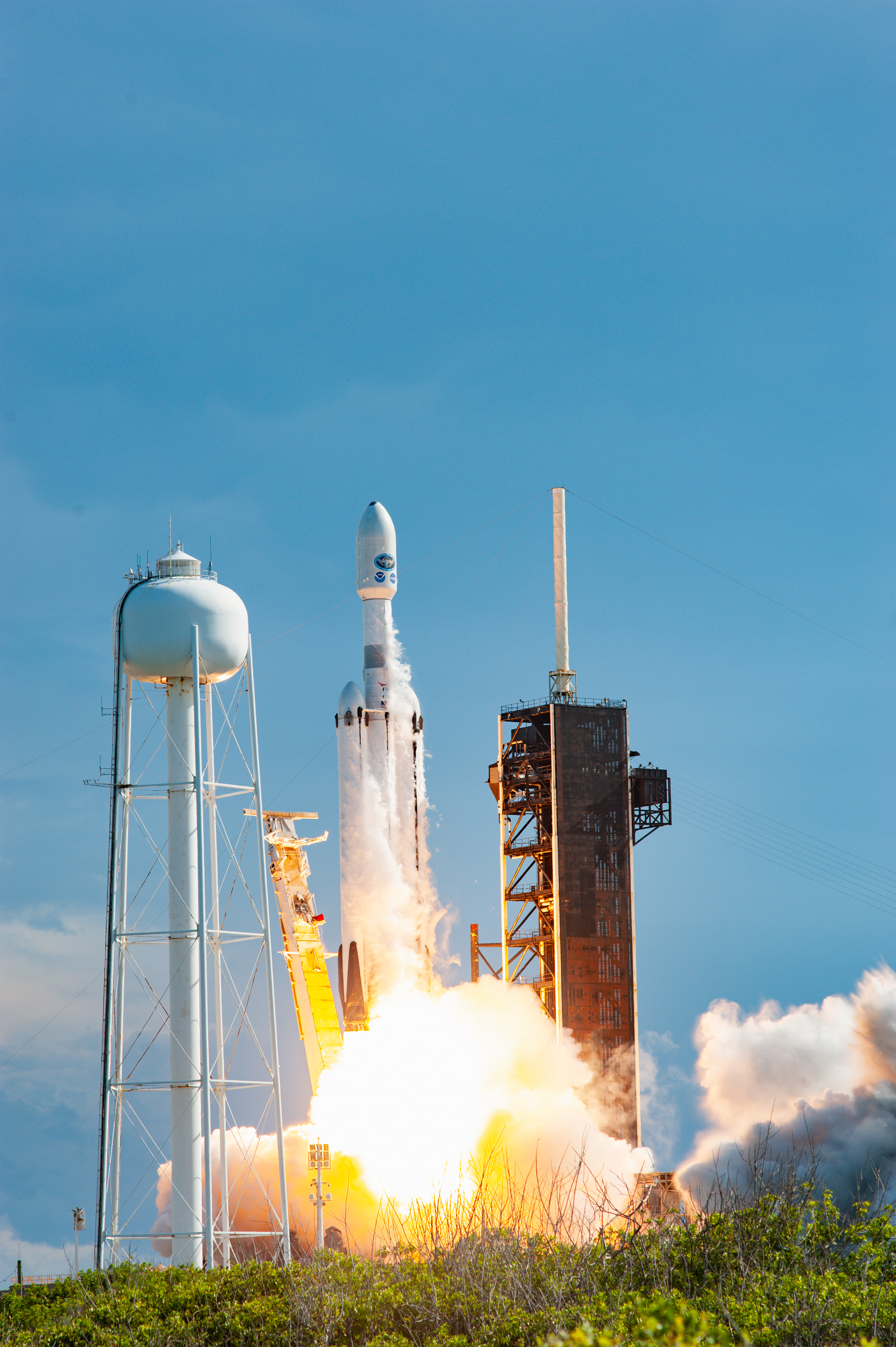
Launch of GOES-19

The satellite was successfully launched into space atop a SpaceX Falcon Heavy rocket on 25 June 2024 at 21:26 UTC (5:26 pm EDT local time at the launch site), from the Kennedy Space Center in Florida, United States. The redesign of the loop heat pipe to prevent an anomaly, as seen in GOES-17, was not expected to delay the launch as with GOES-T. GOES-19 has a dry mass of 2,925 kg (6,449 lb) and a fueled mass of 5,000 kg (11,023 lb).

GOES-19 also carries a copy of the Naval Research Laboratory's Compact CORonagraph (CCOR) instrument designated as CCOR-1 which, along with the CCOR carried onboard Space weather Observations at L1 to Advance Readiness - 1 (SOLAR-1), will allow continued monitoring of solar wind after the retirement of the NASA-ESA SOHO satellite in 2025. CCOR-1 on GOES-19 provides a field of view of 3.7 to 18.7 solar radii, partially comparable to LASCO C3's field of view onboard SOHO, with a 33 arcsecond spatial resolution.

== Malfunction ==
On 15 July 2026 at approximately 20:23 UTC (4:23 pm EDT) GOES-19 stopped transmitting data. Engineers reported the system had fallen back into a "safe hold" state due to an error, and on the next day the hold was resolved and the satellite was prepared for system recovery. On 16 July 2026 at 20:45 UTC (4:45 pm EDT) NOAA reported that updated images from the Advanced Baseline Imager (ABI) instrument were available again, but they were still awaiting restoration of the Geostationary Lightning Mapper (GLM) and Solar Ultraviolet Imager (SUVI) data. On 17 July at 22:46 UTC (6:46 pm EDT) 2026 NOAA reported that engineers had fully restored all instruments.

== Comet discoveries through CCOR-1 ==
The CCOR instrument carried aboard GOES-19 has allowed for the discovery of several sungrazer comets by researchers analyzing CCOR imagery. As of 11 July 2025, GOES-19's CCOR-1 has found 70 comets.

The faint comet 3I/ATLAS was observable from 18–24 October 2025 with GOES-19 as the satellite can see objects down to magnitude 12.
