= GOES-16 =

NOAA weather satellite

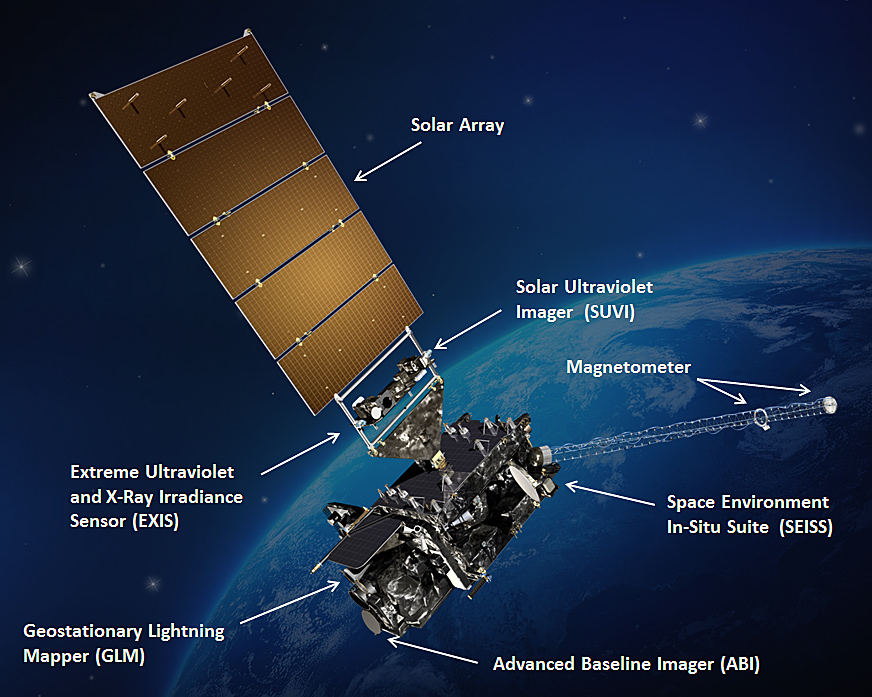
- Artist's impression of GOES-16 in orbit around Earth with major instruments labeled
- Names: GOES-R (before 29 November 2016)
- Mission type: Geostationary weather satellite
- Operator: NASA/NOAA
- COSPAR ID: 2016-071A
- SATCAT no.: 41866
- Website: www.goes-r.gov
- Mission duration: Planned: 15 years Elapsed: 9 years, 11 months, 30 days

Spacecraft properties
- Bus: A2100A
- Manufacturer: Lockheed Martin
- Launch mass: 5,192 kg (11,446 lb)
- Dry mass: 2,857 kg (6,299 lb)
- Dimensions: 6.1 × 5.6 × 3.9 m (20 × 18 × 13 ft)
- Power: 4 kW

Start of mission
- Launch date: 19 November 2016, 23:42 UTC
- Rocket: Atlas V 541 (AV-069)
- Launch site: Cape Canaveral SLC-41
- Contractor: United Launch Alliance
- Entered service: 18 December 2017

Orbital parameters
- Reference system: Geocentric
- Regime: Geostationary
- Longitude: 75.2° West
- Slot: GOES East (after 18 December 2017)
- Semi-major axis: 42,164.8 km (26,200.0 mi)
- Eccentricity: 0.0001538
- Perigee altitude: 35,780.2 km (22,232.8 mi)
- Apogee altitude: 35,793.1 km (22,240.8 mi)
- Inclination: 0.0363°
- Period: 1,436.1 minutes
- Epoch: 1 March 2018, 18:22:45
Instruments
- ABI: Advanced Baseline Imager
- GLM: Geostationary Lightning Mapper
- EXIS: Extreme Ultraviolet and X-ray Irradiance Sensors
- SUVI: Solar Ultraviolet Imager
- MAG: Magnetometer
- SEISS: Space Environment In-Situ Suite
- GOES-R mission insignia GOES

GOES-16, formerly known as GOES-R before reaching geostationary orbit, is the first of the GOES-R series of Geostationary Operational Environmental Satellites (GOES) operated by NASA and the National Oceanic and Atmospheric Administration (NOAA). GOES-16 serves as a backup for NOAA’s operational geostationary constellation. GOES-16 provides high spatial and temporal resolution imagery of the Earth through 16 spectral bands at visible and infrared wavelengths using its Advanced Baseline Imager (ABI). GOES-16's Geostationary Lightning Mapper (GLM) is the first operational lightning mapper flown in geostationary orbit. The spacecraft also includes four other scientific instruments for monitoring space weather and the Sun.

GOES-16's design and instrumentation began in 1999 and was intended to fill key NOAA satellite requirements published that year. Following nearly a decade of instrument planning, spacecraft fabrication was contracted to Lockheed Martin Space Systems in 2008; construction of GOES-16 began in 2012 and lasted until 2014 when the satellite entered the testing phase. After several launch delays, GOES-16 launched from Cape Canaveral on 19 November 2016 aboard a United Launch Alliance (ULA) Atlas V. The spacecraft reached an initial geostationary orbit several days later, beginning a yearlong non-operational checkout and validation phase. In November 2017, GOES-16 began a drift to its operational GOES East position, and was declared fully operational on 18 December 2017. The satellite is expected to have an operational lifespan of ten years, with five additional years as a backup for successive GOES spacecraft.

== Background ==
=== Instrument conceptualization ===
The Geostationary Operational Environmental Satellite (GOES) program began as a joint effort between the National Aeronautics and Space Administration (NASA) and the National Oceanic and Atmospheric Administration (NOAA) in 1975 to develop geostationary weather satellites following the success of the Applications Technology Satellite (ATS) and Synchronous Meteorological Satellite programs beginning in 1966. In the 1999 Operational Requirements Document (ORD) for the Evolution of Future NOAA Operational Geostationary Satellites, NOAA listed instrument requirements for the next generation of GOES imager and sounder. Top priorities included continuous observation capabilities, the ability to observe weather phenomena at all spatial scales, and improved spatial and temporal resolution for both the imager and sounder. These specifications laid the conceptual foundations for the instruments that would eventually be included with GOES-16.

More concrete development of GOES-16 began with the initial designs of an Advanced Baseline Imager (ABI), which started in June 1999 under the direction of Tim Schmitt of the National Environmental Satellite, Data, and Information Service (NESDIS). At its inception, ten spectral bands were considered for inclusion in the new ABI, derived from six instruments on other satellites. In September 1999, the NOAA Research and Development Council endorsed the continued development of the instrument with the suggested bandwidths and frequencies. As the instrument became further realized, the number of potential spectral bands increased from the initial ten, to twelve by October 1999. Alongside the ABI, development also began on the Advanced Baseline Sounder (ABS), which would form a part of a Hyperspectral Environmental Suite (HES) of instruments on the next generation GOES satellites. Like the ABI, the HES also marked significant improvements in resolution and spatial coverage. Initial forecasts were for the ABI to be included as part of GOES beginning with the projected launch of GOES-Q in 2008.

In 2001, NOAA planned for the GOES-R generation of GOES satellites to commence with the expected launch of GOES-R in 2012, with the ABI and ABS as expected instrumentation. GOES-R and its sister satellites were to lead to substantial improvements in forecast accuracy and detail by providing new operational products for users. Four years later, the number of proposed spectral bands on the ABI instrument increased to 16, covering a swath of visible and infrared wavelengths. In September 2006, NOAA dropped plans to include the HES aboard GOES-R, citing a lack of sufficient testing and major cost overruns in the development of the National Polar-orbiting Operational Environmental Satellite System (NPOESS). Although the GOES-R series was expected to cost US$6.2 billion in total, increased instrument complexity, revised inflation assumptions, and program reserves led to the Government Accountability Office estimating a much higher US$11.4 billion cost for the program in 2006.

=== Construction ===
In December 2008, NASA and NOAA selected Lockheed Martin Space Systems as the contractor for the fabrication of the first two satellites of the GOES-R generation, including GOES-R, for an estimated value of contract at US$1.09 billion. Preliminary design review was completed just over two years later, with critical design review being completed in May 2012. Construction of the satellite bus was contracted out to Alliant Techsystems (ATK) and work began shortly thereafter, with the core structure becoming test-ready in January 2013. The Extreme Ultraviolet and X-ray Irradiance Sensors (EXIS) became the first installation-ready instruments for GOES-R in May 2013, while the ABI became integration-ready in February 2014; spacecraft propulsion and system modules were delivered three months later, finalizing the initial construction phase and allowing for complete spacecraft integration and testing at Lockheed Martin's facilities in Colorado. The satellite was then transferred to Kennedy Space Center on 22 August 2016 to undergo additional tests and ready the spacecraft for launch.

== Spacecraft design ==
GOES-16 and other satellites of the GOES-R generation are based around a derivative of Lockheed Martin's A2100 spacecraft bus capable of supporting up to 2,800 kg (6,200 lb) dry mass with power capabilities exceeding 4 kW until the spacecraft's end-of-life. With propellant, GOES-16 had a total mass of 5,192 kg (11,446 lb), with a dry mass of 2,857 kg (6,299 lb). The spacecraft has dimensions of 6.1 m × 5.6 m × 3.9 m (20 ft × 18 ft × 13 ft). GOES-16 is powered by a solar array containing five solar panels that were folded at launch and unfurled after deployment. GOES-16 was designed to have a service lifetime of 15 years, including 10 years as an operational satellite and 5 additional years as a backup for successive GOES satellites. GOES-16's command and data handling subsystem is based around the SpaceWire bus; a modified version of the SpaceWire protocol was developed specifically for GOES-16 as a cost and risk reduction measure, with the associated application-specific integrated circuit being developed by British Aerospace. The GOES Reliable Data Delivery Protocol (GRDDP) complements preexisting SpaceWire capabilities and includes packet loss detection and recovery. The satellite's instruments collect and transfer payload data to the spacecraft at 10–100 Mbit/s. Spacecraft stability and accuracy is maintained by several reaction wheels, gyrometers, and a star tracker. GOES-16 is also the first geostationary civilian spacecraft to use GPS to assess its orbit. Such calibration equipment is intended to establish the satellite's position within a 100 m (330 ft) radius with a confidence of 3σ.

== Instruments ==
First data released from GOES-16 instruments

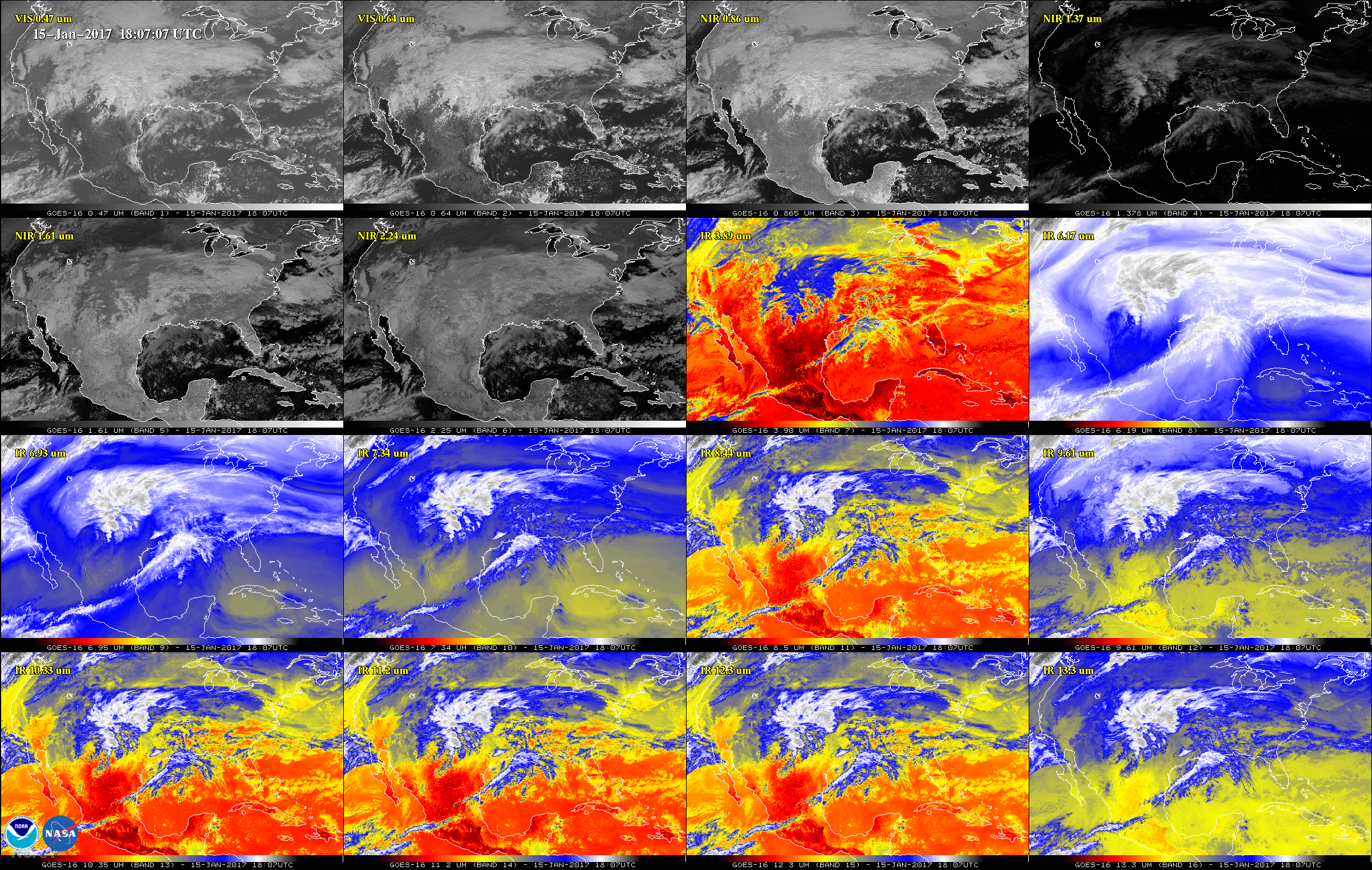
ABI – data from ABI's 16 spectral bands on 15 January 2017

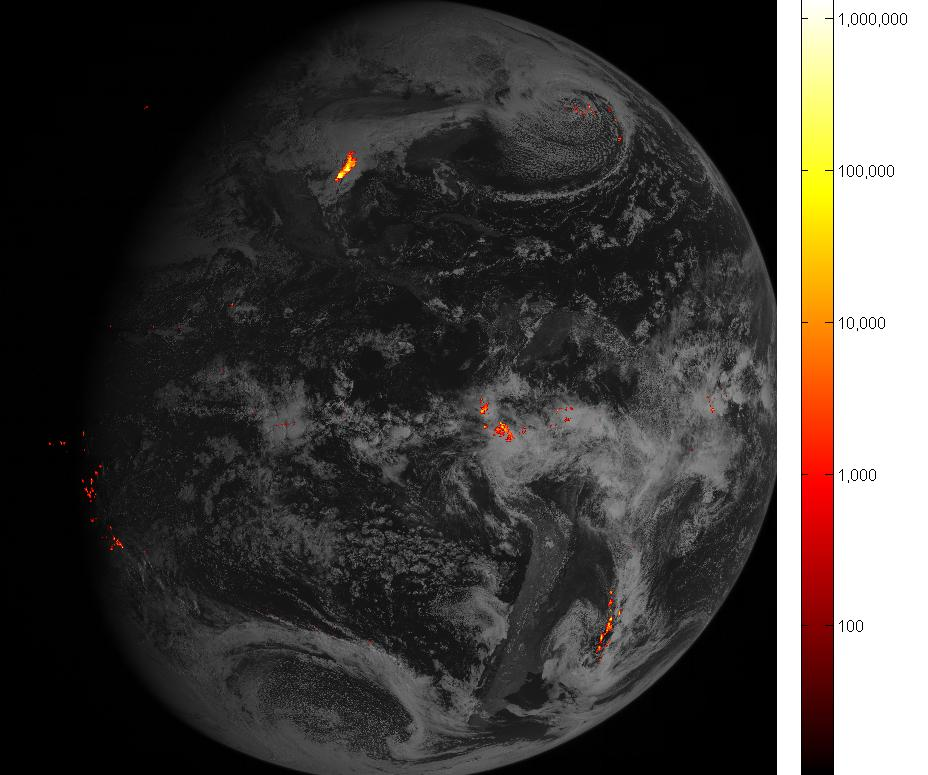
GLM – GLM data superimposed on ABI band 2 data on 14 February 2017

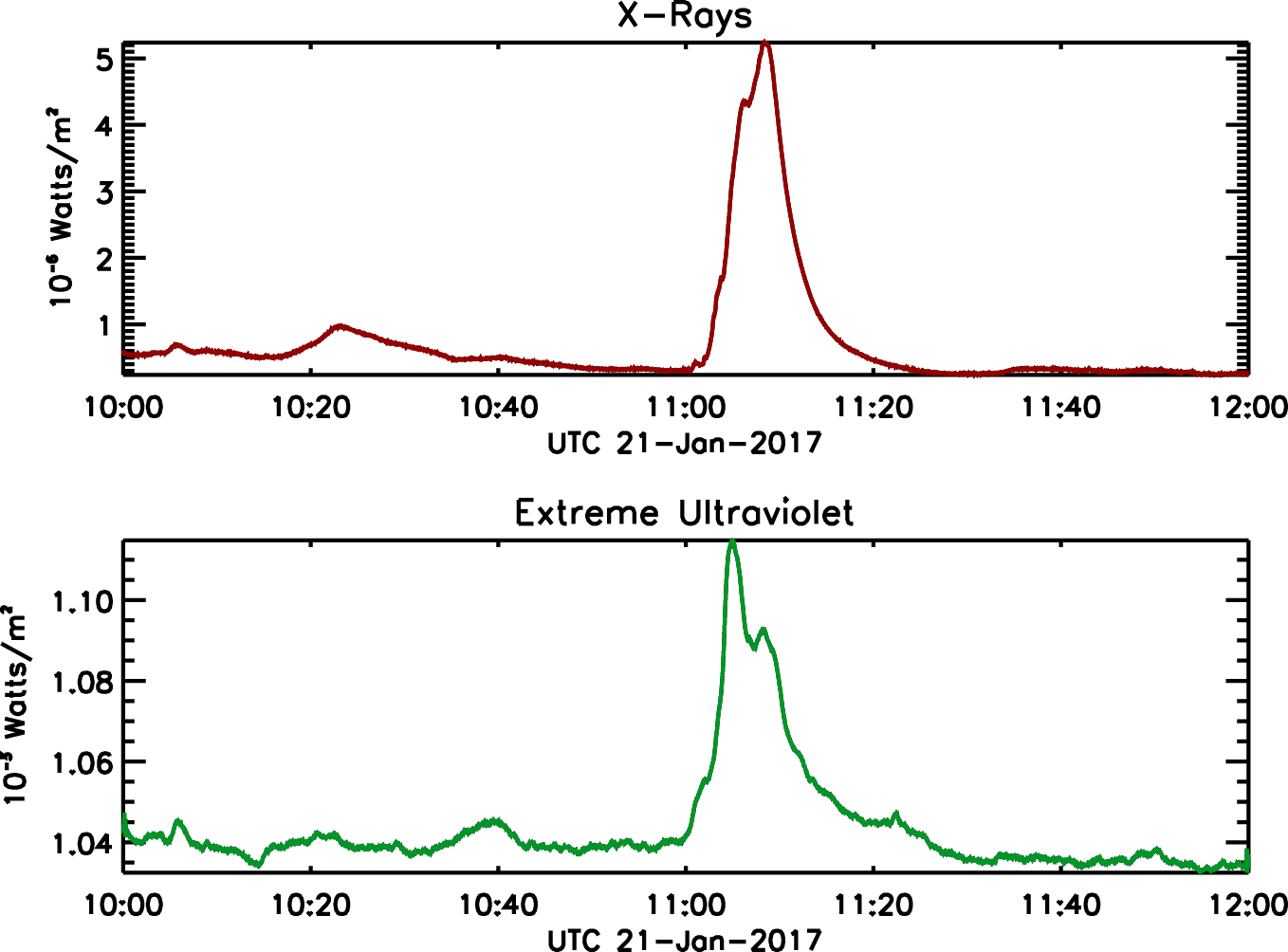
EXIS – plot of EXIS data showing a solar flare on 21 January 2017

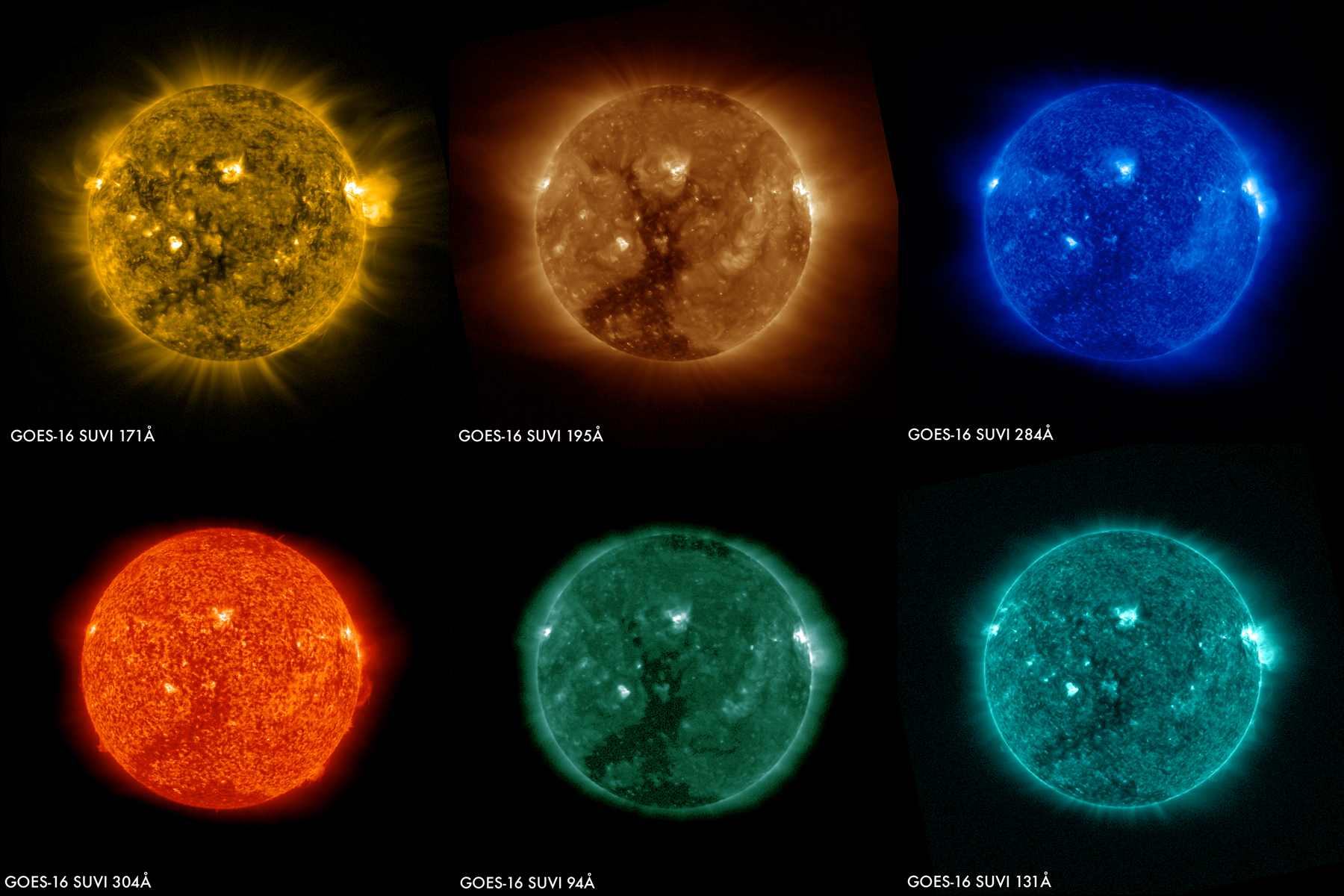
SUVI – data from SUVI's six spectral bands on 29 January 2017

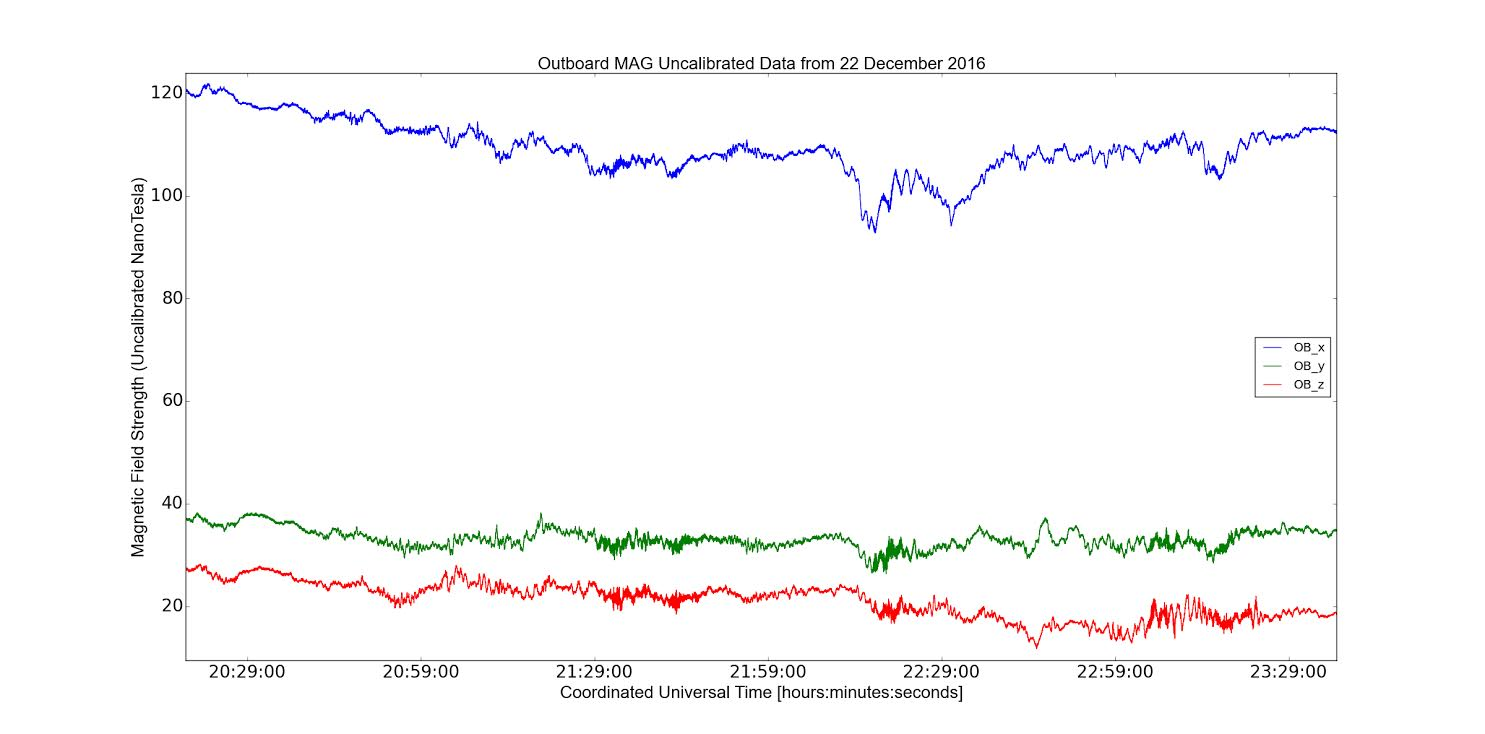
MAG – plot of MAG data on 22 December 2016

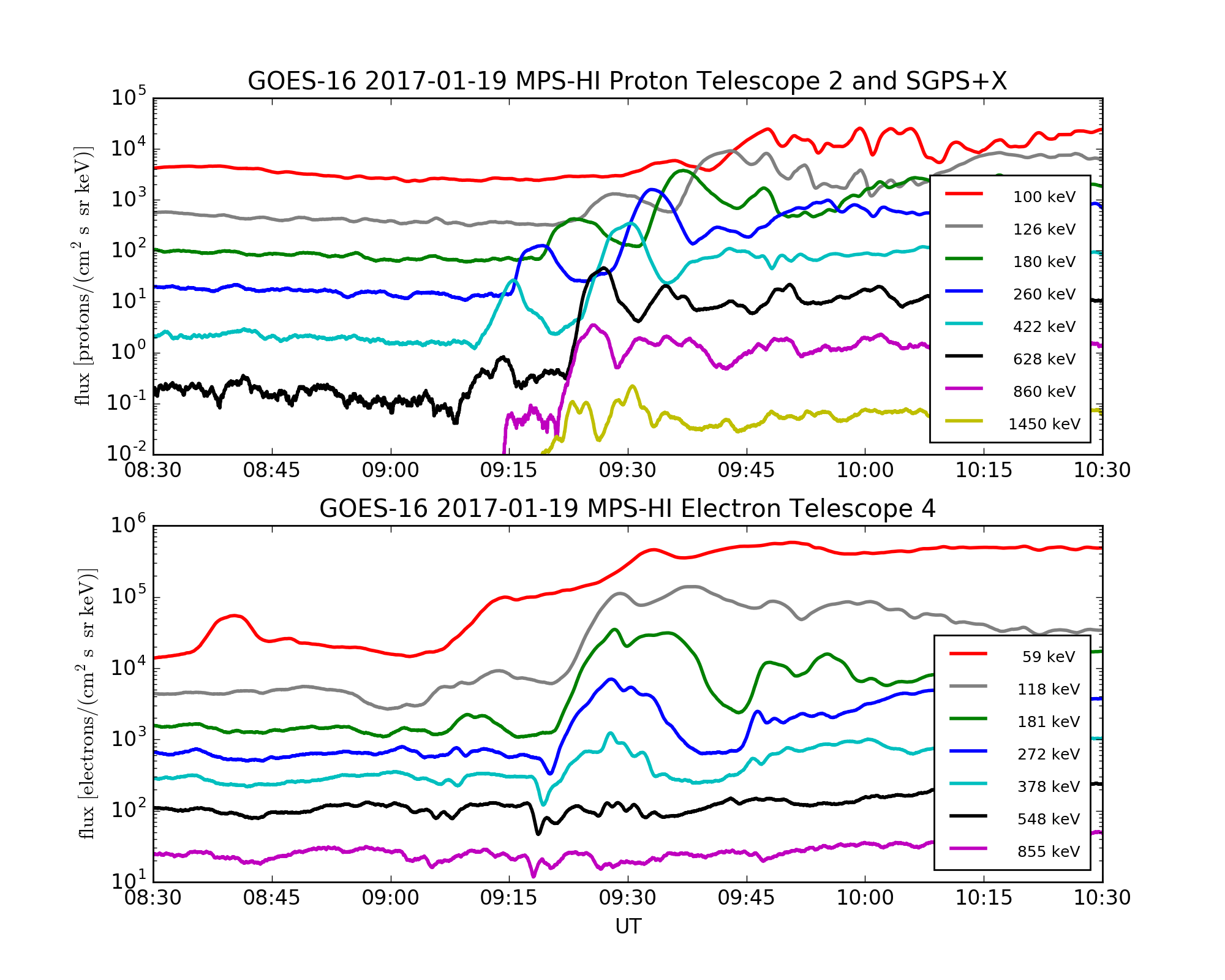
SEISS – plot of electron and proton fluxes from SEISS on 19 January 2017

=== Earth-facing ===
The Advanced Baseline Imager (ABI) and Geostationary Lightning Mapper (GLM) make up GOES-16's Earth-facing, or nadir-pointing, instruments. These are positioned on a stable precision-pointed platform isolated from the rest of the spacecraft.

==== Advanced Baseline Imager (ABI) ====
The Advanced Baseline Imager (ABI) is the primary imaging instrument on GOES-16, providing over 65 percent of all GOES-16 data products. A multi-channel passive imaging radiometer, ABI takes images of the Earth with 16 spectral bands, including two visible channels, four near-infrared channels, and ten infrared channels. The individual bands are optimized for various atmospheric phenomena, including cloud formation, atmospheric motion, convection, land surface temperature, ocean dynamics, flow of water, fire, smoke, volcanic ash plumes, aerosols and air quality, and vegetative health. ABI's "red" visible band 2 (λ = 0.64 μm) has the highest resolution among the 16 bands at 0.5 km (0.31 mi) per pixel. The other visible light and near-infrared bands have a resolution of 1 km (0.62 mi), while the infrared bands have a resolution of 2 km (1.2 mi) per pixel.

The sensors on the ABI are made of different materials depending on the spectral band, with silicon used for sensors operating in visible light and mercury cadmium telluride used for sensors operated in the near-infrared and infrared. An ABI electronics unit and cryocooler control electronics complement the sensor unit to power the imager and keep the instrument at cryogenic temperatures; all electronics and the sensor array are redundant to ensure operation longetivity. Development of the ABI was contracted to Harris Corporation of Fort Wayne, Indiana. Several other companies were involved in the development and fabrication of the ABI, including BAE Systems, BEI Technologies, Babcock Corporation, DRS Technologies, L3 Technologies SSG-Tinsley, and Northrop Grumman Space Technology.

The ABI takes images with three different geographic extents, with each image produced as a combination of stitched west-to-east narrow image scans made by the instrument. In the default "flex" mode (scan mode 3) of operation, the ABI produces full-disk images of the Earth every 15 minutes, with a spatial resolution of 0.5–2 km (0.31–1.24 mi). However, the ABI can also operate on continuous disk mode (scan mode 4), whereby full disk images are recorded every 5 minutes. Full-disk images are composed of 26 image strips, making it more efficient than the preceding GOES imager, which was made with 1,300 image strips. The instrument also images a 5,000 km × 3,000 km (3,100 mi × 1,900 mi) area centered on the contiguous United States every five minutes at a resolution of 0.5–2 km (0.31–1.24 mi). Where possible, the ABI can also image mesoscale phenomena over two selected 1,000 km × 1,000 km (620 mi × 620 mi) areas every 60 seconds at a resolution of 0.5–2 km (0.31–1.24 mi). The variable scanning modes make GOES-16 the first GOES satellite to be configurable while in orbit. In addition, a solar diffuser new to GOES-16 allows for calibration of the ABI imaging data. On 2 April 2019, the GOES-16 ABI was reconfigured to use scan mode 6 as a default, allowing full disk scans every 10 minutes.

The ABI onboard GOES-16 represents a significant improvement over the imager onboard previous GOES satellites. The sixteen spectral bands on the ABI, as opposed to the five on the previous GOES generation, represents a two-fold increase in spectral information. In addition, the ABI features up to four times greater spatial resolution and five times greater temporal resolution over the previous GOES imager. The ABI is nearly identical to the Advanced Himawari Imager (AHI) first used on the Japan Meteorological Agency's Himawari 8, which launched on 7 October 2014. The two instruments share 15 of the same spectral bands and have one spectral band unique to either instrument, with the ABI featuring a 1.37 μm near-infrared band for cirrus cloud detection while the AHI uses a 0.51 μm band optimized for reflectance around the green portion of the visible spectrum. Lacking an explicit band for green light, true-color imagery for ABI is created using the combination of the ABI's red and blue visible bands along with a synthesized green band; the simulated green band is created by applying algorithms based on MODIS and AHI onto existing ABI spectral bands.

ABI spectral bands
| Band | λ (μm) | Central λ (μm) | Pixel spacing (km) | Nickname | Classification | Primary function | Source |
|---|---|---|---|---|---|---|---|
| 1 | 0.45–0.49 | 0.47 | 1 | Blue | Visible | Aerosols | |
| 2 | 0.59–0.69 | 0.64 | 0.5 | Red | Visible | Clouds | |
| 3 | 0.846–0.885 | 0.865 | 1 | Veggie | Near-infrared | Vegetation | |
| 4 | 1.371–1.386 | 1.378 | 2 | Cirrus | Near-infrared | Cirrus | |
| 5 | 1.58–1.64 | 1.61 | 1 | Snow/Ice | Near-infrared | Snow/ice discrimination, cloud phase | |
| 6 | 2.225–2.275 | 2.25 | 2 | Cloud Particle Size | Near-infrared | Cloud particle size, snow cloud phase | |
| 7 | 3.80–4.00 | 3.90 | 2 | Shortwave Window | Infrared | Fog, stratus, fire, volcanism | |
| 8 | 5.77–6.6 | 6.19 | 2 | Upper-level Tropospheric Water Vapor | Infrared | Various atmospheric features | |
| 9 | 6.75–7.15 | 6.95 | 2 | Mid-level Tropospheric Water Vapor | Infrared | Water vapor features | |
| 10 | 7.24–7.44 | 7.34 | 2 | Lower-level Tropospheric Water Vapor | Infrared | Water vapor features | |
| 11 | 8.3–8.7 | 8.5 | 2 | Cloud-Top Phase | Infrared | Cloud-top phase | |
| 12 | 9.42–9.8 | 9.61 | 2 | Ozone | Infrared | Total column ozone | |
| 13 | 10.1–10.6 | 10.35 | 2 | Clean Infrared Longwave Window | Infrared | Clouds | |
| 14 | 10.8–11.6 | 11.2 | 2 | Infrared Longwave Window | Infrared | Clouds | |
| 15 | 11.8–12.8 | 12.3 | 2 | Dirty Infrared Longwave Window | Infrared | Clouds | |
| 16 | 13.0–13.6 | 13.3 | 2 | CO_{2} Longwave Infrared | Infrared | Air temperature, clouds | |

==== Geostationary Lightning Mapper (GLM) ====
The GOES-16 Geostationary Lightning Mapper (GLM) is a single-channel near-infrared detector that monitors for the short-lived light emitted by lightning. In mapping lightning, GLM data can be used to alert forecasters to nascent severe weather as developing storms or tornado progenitors often exhibit an increase in lightning activity due to updraft intensification; by extension, such information can also reduce false alarm rates of severe thunderstorm and tornado warnings. GOES-16 was the first spacecraft to carry a lightning mapper in geostationary orbit. The GLM can detect both cloud-to-cloud and cloud-to-ground lightning during daytime and nighttime, complementing land-based lightning detection. GLM's sensitivity results in a detection rate of 70–90% of all lightning strikes in its viewing area. The camera is a 1372 × 1300 pixel staring CCD sensitive to 777.4 nm light with a spatial resolution of 8 km (5.0 mi) at the nadir and 14 km (8.7 mi) near the edge of the instrument's field-of-view, resulting in a spatial resolution averaging roughly 10 km (6.2 mi). The 777.4 nm band was chosen as lightning strikes have three prominent spectral lines originating from atomic oxygen centered at 777.4 nm. The latitudinal coverage of the instrument is limited to between 52°N and 52°S. To limit interference of undesired light, a solar blocking filter and solar rejection filter are affixed to the front of the instrument's aperture. The GLM can take an image every 2 ms, or 500 frames per second, with a data downlink of 7.7 Mbit/s. Information from GLM is used to determine the frequency, location, and extent of lightning strikes. Data from the GLM can be mapped in real-time using open-source software that has also been adapted by the United States National Weather Service Development of the GLM was contracted by the Lockheed Martin Advanced Technology Center in Palo Alto, California.

Unforeseen during the instrument design, GLM is able to detect Bolides in the atmosphere and thereby facilitates meteor sciences.

=== Sun-facing ===
The Sun-facing, or solar-pointing, components of GOES-16 include the EXIS and SUVI, which are located on a Sun Pointing Platform (SPP) on the spacecraft's solar array yoke; the SPP tracks the seasonal and daily movement of the sun relative to GOES-16, and also supports GOES-16's Unique Payload Services.

==== Extreme Ultraviolet and X-ray Irradiance Sensors (EXIS) ====
The Extreme Ultraviolet and X-ray Irradiance Sensors (EXIS) are a pair of sensors that monitor solar irradiance in the Earth's upper atmosphere. In monitoring irradiance, EXIS can detect solar flares which can disrupt power grids, communications, and navigational systems on Earth and satellites. Variability in irradiance influences conditions in the ionosphere and thermosphere. The Extreme Ultraviolet Sensor (EUVS) monitors changes in solar extreme ultraviolet irradiance which shape upper atmospheric variability, with an ultraviolet wavelength range of 5–127 nm. Data from EUVS can anticipate radio blackouts for high frequency (HF) communications in low latitudes and the expansion of the thermosphere, which can induce increased drag and degrade instruments on satellites in low Earth orbit. The X-Ray Sensor (XRS) component of EXIS monitors solar flares through X-ray irradiance, allowing for the prediction of a solar particle event. The XRS detects X-rays with wavelengths between 0.05–0.8 nm. Together, the EXIS instrument weighs 30 kg (66 lb) and consumes 40 W of power.

==== Solar Ultraviolet Imager (SUVI) ====
The Solar Ultraviolet Imager (SUVI) is an ultraviolet telescope onboard GOES-16 that produces full-disk images of the sun in the extreme ultraviolet range, succeeding the former GOES Solar X-ray Imager instrument onboard previous GOES satellite generations. The goals of SUVI are to locate coronal holes, detect and locate solar flares, monitor changes that indicate coronal mass ejections, detect active regions beyond the Sun's east limb, and analyze the complexity of active regions on the sun. The telescope is composed of six different wavelength bands centered between 94–304 Å specialized for different solar features. The GOES-16's ultraviolet imager is analogous to the Extreme ultraviolet Imaging Telescope on the Solar and Heliospheric Observatory.

=== Space environment ===
GOES-16 features two instruments, the Magnetometer (MAG) and Space Environment In-Situ Suite (SEISS), that provide localized in-situ observations of high-energy particles and magnetic fields in geostationary orbit.

==== Magnetometer (MAG) ====
The GOES-16 Magnetometer (MAG) is a tri-axial fluxgate magnetometer that measures the Earth's magnetic field at the outer extents of the magnetosphere from geostationary orbit. MAG provides general data on geomagnetic activity, which can be used to detect solar storms and validate large-scale space environment modelling; charged particles associated with the interaction of the solar wind and the magnetosphere present dangerous radiation hazards to spacecraft and human spaceflight. The magnetometer samples the magnetic field at a resolution of 0.016 nT at a frequency of 2.5 Hz. On GOES-16, MAG consists of two sensors positioned on an 8 m (26 ft) deployable boom, separating the instruments from the main spacecraft body to reduce the influence of the satellite's own magnetic signature. The tri-axial design allows for the measurement of the orthogonal vector components of the Earth's magnetic field. Development of the instrument was contracted by Lockheed Martin Advanced Technology Center based in Palo Alto, California. The electronic and sensor components of MAG were built by Macintyre Electronic Design Associates, Inc. (MEDA) in Sterling, Virginia, while the deployable boom was built by ATK in Goleta, California.

Shortly after boom deployed on December 7, 2016, operators observed thermally induced offset possibly due to the "inadvertent application and subsequent removal" of magnetically susceptible tape to the thermal blanket. Because of this, NOAA relies on the outboard magnetometer for operational space weather monitoring while advising caution or avoiding the inboard sensor.

==== Space Environment In-Situ Suite (SEISS) ====
The Space Environment In-Situ Suite (SEISS) consists of four sensors with a wide variance in field-of-view that monitor proton, electron, and heavy ion fluxes in the magnetosphere. (Note: A heavy ion is an ion with a mass greater than helium-4.) The suite monitors 27 differential electron energy channels and 32 differential proton energy channels, an increase over the six electron energy channels and 12 proton energy channels monitored by the previous GOES-N generation of satellites. The Energetic Heavy Ion Sensor (EHIS) specifically measures heavy ion fluxes, including those trapped in Earth's magnetosphere and particles originated from the sun or in cosmic rays. There are two Magnetospheric Particle Sensors, Low and High (MPS-LO and MPS-HI, respectively) that measure electron and proton fluxes. MPS-LO measures low energy flux over a 30 eV–30 keV range; electrons with these energies can cause unintended charging of the spacecraft, causing electrostatic discharge or arcing across GOES-16 components, resulting in significant and permanent hardware damage. MPS-HI measures medium- to high-energy electrons with energies of up to 4 MeV and protons with energies of up to 12 MeV. Electrons at these energies easily penetrate spacecraft and may cause internal dielectric breakdown or discharge damage. The Solar and Galactic Proton Sensor (SGPS) instrument included in SEISS measures energetic protons from solar or galactic sources found in the magnetosphere. Such protons in large quantities can cause biological effects on humans at high altitudes, as well as HF blackouts in the polar regions. Development of SEISS was contracted by Assurance Technology Corporation in Carlisle, Massachusetts, and subcontracted to the University of New Hampshire.

== Launch and mission profile ==
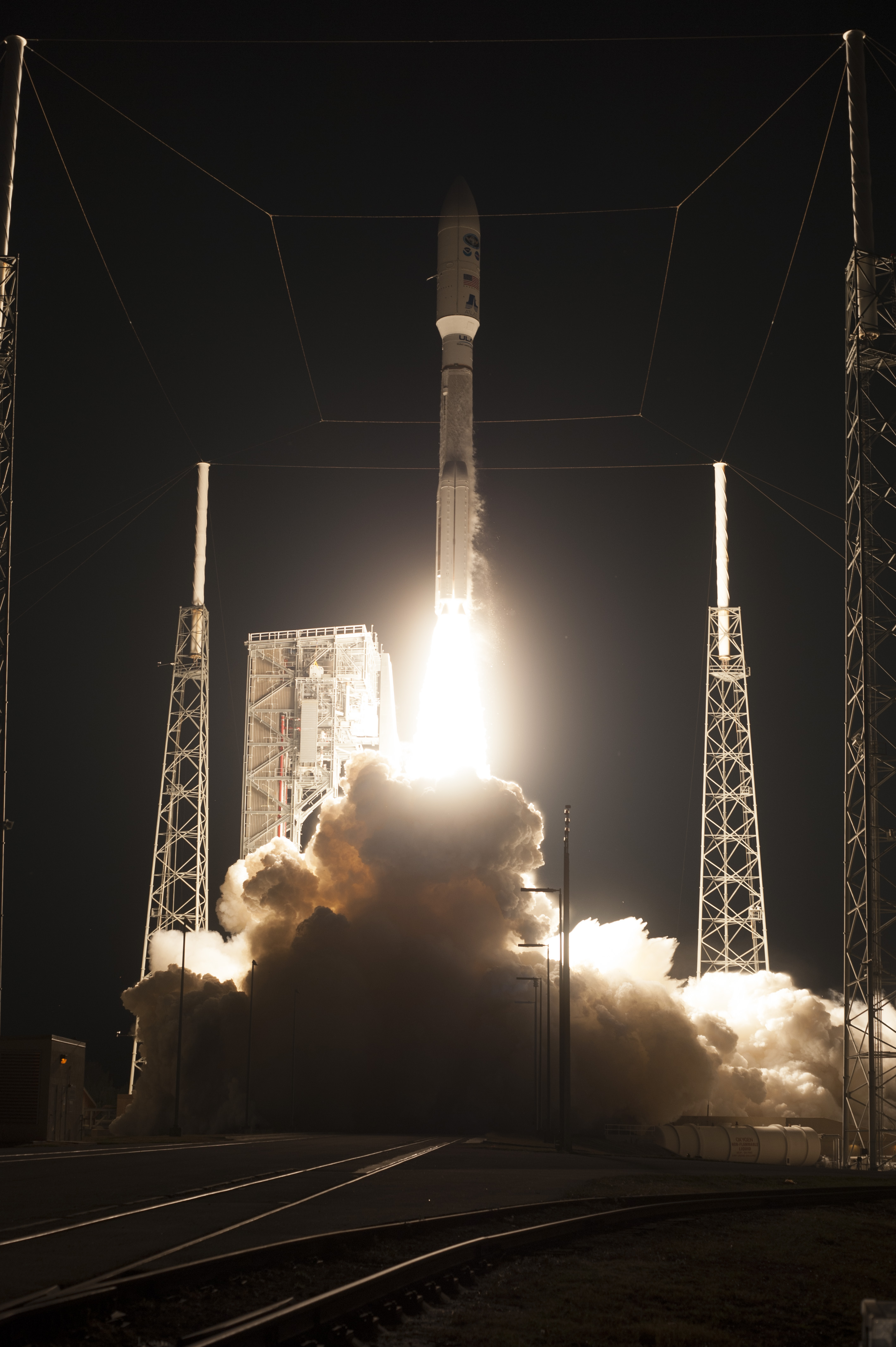
The launch of GOES-R aboard an Atlas V rocket on 19 November 2016

NASA selected the Atlas V 541 operated by United Launch Services as the launch vehicle for GOES-R on 5 April 2012, with a launch date slated for October 2015 from Cape Canaveral Air Force Station Space Launch Complex 41. Combined with the subsequent GOES-S, launch operations were expected to cost US$446 million. The launch date was chosen relatively early to maintain the operation of the GOES satellite constellation despite there being only a 48% confidence in meeting the October 2015 launch date; an audit by the Office of Inspector General of the Department of Commerce in April 2013 highlighted these concerns and projected a February 2016 launch which would reduce development stress at the cost of increasing the risk for gaps in satellite coverage should the operational backup satellites fail. Difficulties with GOES-R software and communications equipment caused the expected launch to be delayed to early 2016, and on 15 October 2015, the launch was pushed further to 13 October 2016. In early October 2016, GOES-R was secured in preparation for the close passage of Hurricane Matthew and did not sustain any damage. However, the tipping of a ground system rail van housing the spacecraft and the discovery of a booster fault on the Atlas V rocket—the same issue that had prevented the launch of WorldView-4 earlier in 2016—resulted in another delay of the launch window to 19 November 2016.

On 18 November 2016, the mated GOES-R spacecraft and the Atlas V launch vehicle were moved to the launch pad at Space Launch Complex 41. GOES-R was launched on 19 November 2016 at 23:42 UTC (6:42 p.m. EST) from Cape Canaveral Air Force Station Space Launch Complex 41 aboard an Atlas V rocket. An undisclosed issue on the Eastern Range and verification of a potential concern on another rocket had delayed the launch by an hour towards the end of the 19 November launch window. The Atlas V was in the 541 configuration with tail number AV-069 and was administered by United Launch Alliance; (Note: The digits of the 541 configuration indicate a payload fairing diameter of 5 m (16 ft), 4 AJ-60A solid rocket boosters complementing the Atlas V's first stage, and 1 engine on the Centaur upper-stage of the Atlas V.) the launch was the 100th of the Evolved Expendable Launch Vehicle program and 138th of the Atlas program. The Atlas V's ascent was directed slightly south of east over the Atlantic Ocean. Following the rocket's first stage, additional burns in subsequent stages steered the spacecraft towards the altitude needed for geosynchronous orbit. Spacecraft separation from the launch vehicle occurred over Indonesia roughly 3.5 hours after launch, placing GOES-R in an elliptical low-inclination geostationary transfer orbit with a perigee of 5,038 mi (8,108 km) and an apogee of 21,926 mi (35,286 km).

The spacecraft then initiated several burns using its own independent propulsion systems to refine its orbit to place it in the intended geostationary position, with eight days dedicated to increasing its orbital radius and four to orbital fine-tuning. During the first corrective burn, the truss holding the main engine nozzle warmed to anomalously high temperatures. Although the exceeded pre-flight temperature limits were revised, the subsequent four burns were limited to less than 41 minutes each in duration out of an abundance of caution, bringing it to its preliminary geostationary orbit ten days after launch. In reaching geostationary orbit, GOES-R was redesignated as GOES-16, beginning a yearlong extended checkout and validation phase. The spacecraft was initially positioned in a non-operational test position at 89.5°W, with GOES-13 and GOES-15 serving as the operational weather satellites in the traditional GOES East and GOES West positions, respectively. Instruments were initially kept dormant for a 30-day period to allow for outgassing and the clearing of any contaminants in the spacecraft. The first science data from GOES-16 was received from the MAG instrument on 22 December 2016, while the first images from ABI were collected on 15 January 2017 and released on 23 January 2017. On 25 May 2017, NOAA announced that GOES-16 would occupy the GOES East position once operational, succeeding GOES-13. GOES-16's move to its operational position began at around 13:30 UTC on 30 November 2017, drifting about 1.41° per day to a final longitude of 75.2°W; during this time, the spacecraft's instruments were kept in a diagnostic mode without data collection or transmission. GOES-16 reached the GOES East position by 11 December, and following a calibration period, resumed instrument data collection and transmission three days later. On 18 December 2017, GOES-16 was declared fully operational.

== Mission ==
NOAA retired GOES-16 from operational service on April 7, 2025, when it was replaced by GOES-19 as NOAA’s GOES East satellite. It's instruments were then shut off and it was put into a cold status. On June 12, 2025 it replaced GOES-17 and GOES-14 as the "GOES-BACKUP" satellite. It stands ready to replace GOES-18 or GOES-19 if needed. GOES-17 serves as an additional backup.

== Unique Payload Services and data processing ==
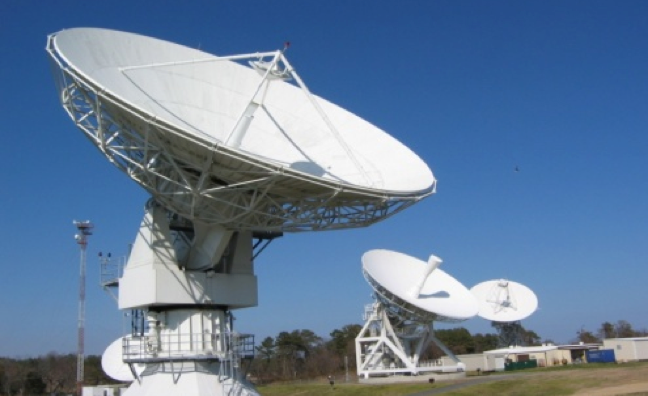
The Wallops Command and Data Acquisition Station on Wallops Island, Virginia serves as the primary point for telemetry, tracking, and command of GOES-16.

=== Unique Payload Services ===
In addition to its primary science payload, GOES-16 also features the Unique Payload Services (UPS) suite which provide communications relay services ancillary to the mission's primary operations:

- GOES Rebroadcast (GRB) – GOES-16's downlink is handled by the GRB system, which serves as the primary full resolution and near-real-time relay for the satellite's instrument data. The instrument data are processed as Level 1b data for all instruments and Level 2 data for the GLM. (Note: Level 1a refers to reconstructed, unprocessed instrument data at full resolution, time-referenced, and annotated with ancillary information, including radiometric and geometric calibration coefficients and georeferencing parameters. Level 1b data are Level 1A data that have been processed to sensor units. Level 2 data include derived geophysical variables at the same resolution and location as Level 1 source data.) The GRB replaces the former GOES VARiable (GVAR) service used by previous GOES spacecraft. The dual circular polarized signal is centered within the L band at 1686.6 MHz and consists of two 15.5 Mbit/s digital streams for a total data rate of 31 Mbit/s.
- Data Collection System (DCS) – GOES-16 also serves as a relay satellite that rebroadcasts in-situ ground environmental observations, typically from remote locations, to other ground receiving sites. The GOES-16 DCS supports 433 user-platform channels with a downlink frequency range of 1679.70–1680.10 MHz.
- Emergency Managers Weather Information Network (EMWIN) – EMWIN transmits products and other information from the United States National Weather Service. EMWIN is also coupled with the High Rate Information Transmission (HRIT) service, which broadcasts low-resolution GOES imagery and selected products to remotely located user HRIT terminals.
- Search and Rescue Satellite Aided Tracking (SARSAT) – A SARSAT transponder on GOES-16 can detect distress signals and relay them to local user terminals to aid in the coordination of rescue operations. The transponder can be accessed with a relatively low uplink power of 32 dBm, allowing it to detect weak emergency beacons.

=== Integrated ground system and data distribution ===
An integrated ground system for data acquisition, processing, and dissemination was specially designed for GOES-16 and other satellites in the GOES-R generation of GOES spacecraft. The NOAA Satellite Operations Facility in Suitland, Maryland, serves as the point of command for GOES mission operations, while the Wallops Command and Data Acquisition Station at Wallops Flight Facility on Wallops Island, Virginia, handles GOES-16 telemetry, tracking, command, and instrument data. A second station in Fairmont, West Virginia, serves as the designated Consolidated Backup to the Wallops facility. The antennas at Wallops are designed to withstand sustained winds of 110 mph (180 km/h) and gusts of up to 150 mph (240 km/h), conditions expected in a Category 2 hurricane. Together, the ground system involves 2,100 servers and 3 PB of data storage; data processing is handled by 3,632 processor cores capable of 40 trillion floating point operations per second. In 2009, NOAA contracted the Government Communications Systems Division of Harris Corporation with the development of the GOES-R ground system, with an estimated value of contract at US$736 million; Harris was also awarded a US$130 million contract to develop the ground antenna system, including six new large-aperture transceiving antennas and upgrades to four existing antennas at the NOAA Satellite Operations Facility. To aid in systems engineering and data distribution tools for the ground segment, Boeing was awarded a $55 million subcontract.

In addition to GRB, which can be accessed by any calibrated receiver, GOES data is also distributed through other channels. The National Weather Service receives data directly from GOES-16 through the Advanced Weather Interactive Processing System (AWIPS) interface, which integrates meteorological and hydrological data with the agency's forecast and warning issuance systems. Real-time GOES-16 data is available through the Product Distribution and Access (PDA) system, while archived data is stored on the Comprehensive Large Array-data Stewardship System (CLASS).

=== GOES-R Proving Ground ===
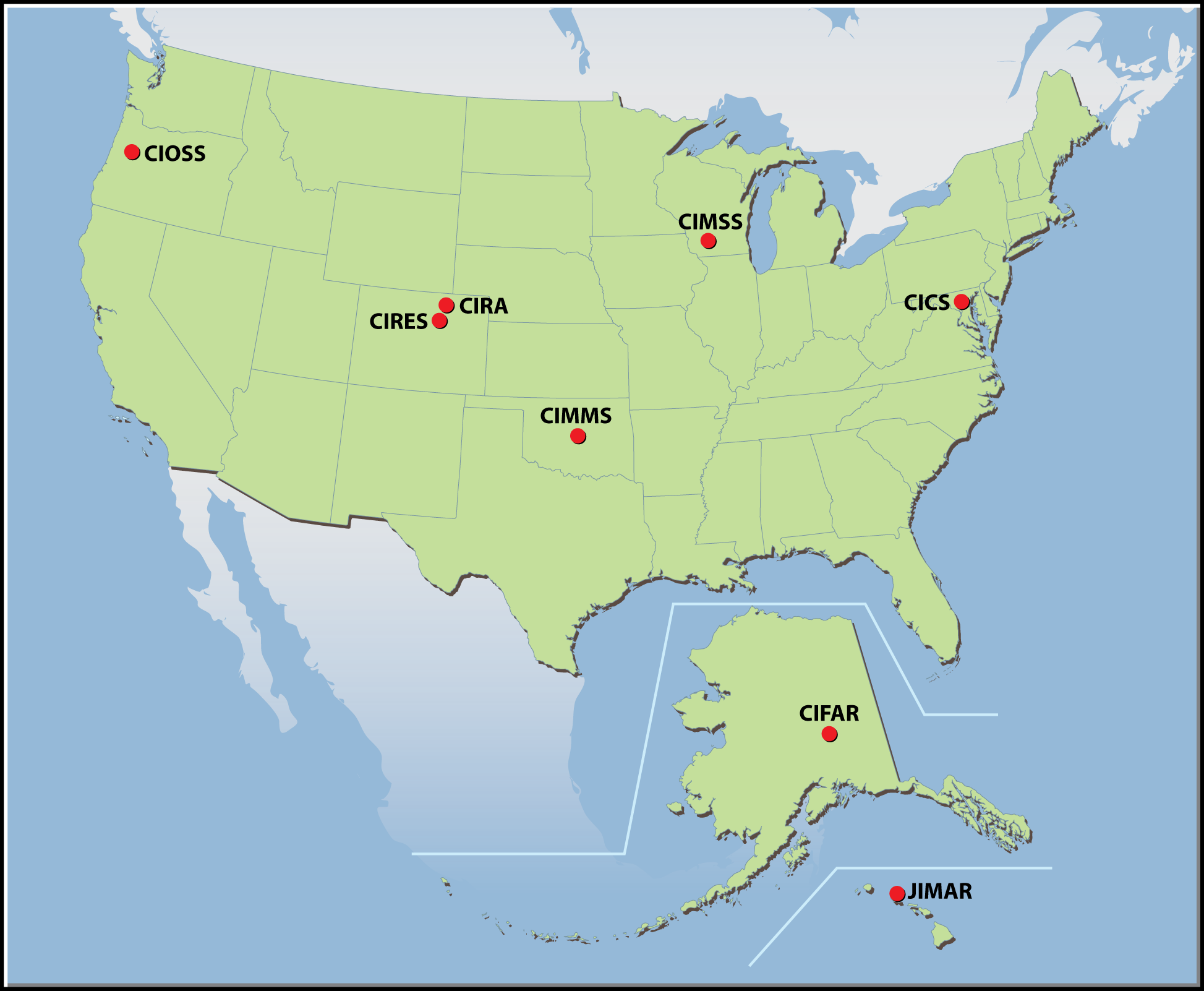
GOES-R Cooperative Institutes

The GOES-R Proving Ground was established in 2008 as a collaboration between the GOES-R series program office and a number of NOAA and NASA centers to prepare forecasters and other interests for new products that would be available with the GOES-R generation of weather satellites. The technological proving ground addressed recommendations from the National Research Council in 2000 for NOAA to develop teams demonstrating the scope of new sensors like those on GOES-16 in concert with instrument design. The AWIPS-centric program was designed to allow for evaluation and development of simulated GOES-R products and provide training for forecasters. Experimental products were based on both contemporaneous and synthetic data. The first six years from 2008 to 2014 were primarily dedicated to algorithm development, simulation design, decision aid development, and end-to-end testing, while the ensuing years up to spacecraft launch would deal primarily with tailoring products to user feedback.

Participants in the proving ground program were classified as developers—those developing the satellite algorithms and training materials for GOES-R products—or users—the recipients of those products. The three primary developers in the program were the Cooperative Institute for Meteorological Satellite Studies (CIMSS) and Advanced Satellite Products Branch (ASPB) at the University of Wisconsin in Madison, Wisconsin; the Cooperative Institute for Research in the Atmosphere (CIRA) and Regional and Mesoscale Meteorology Branch (RAMMB) at Colorado State University in Fort Collins, CO; and NASA's Short-term Prediction Research and Transition Center (NASA SPoRT) in Huntsville, Alabama. GOES-R testbed and technology demonstrations were focused on a variety of applications including tropical cyclone intensity estimation, severe storm development, aviation, and air quality.

== See also ==
- Cospas-Sarsat
- Earth observation satellite
- Geostationary orbit
- Geostationary Operational Environmental Satellite
- Remote sensing
- Space Weather Prediction Center
- Storm Prediction Center
- Weather satellite
