= GOES-18 =

NOAA weather satellite

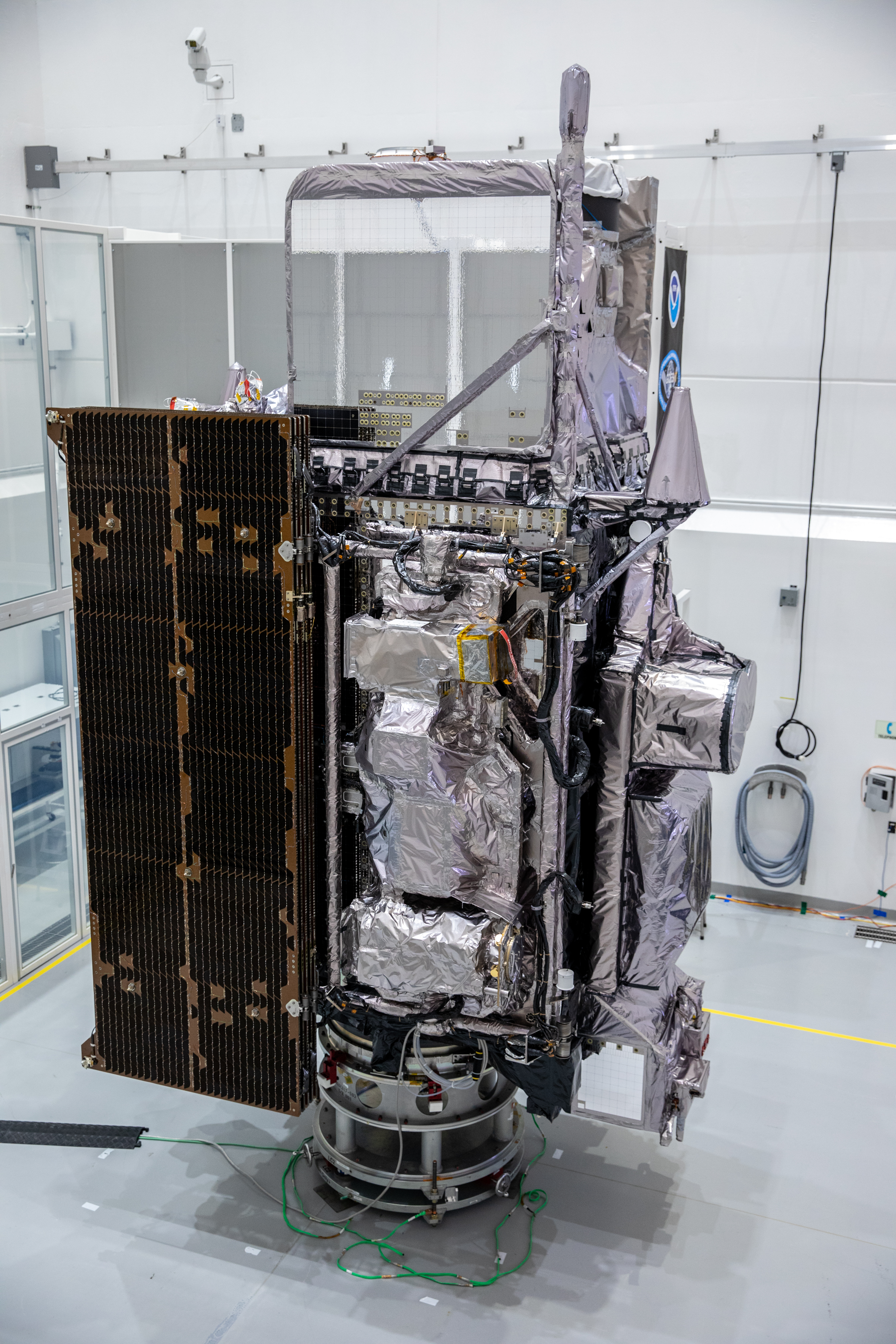
- GOES-T in the Astrotech Space Operations facility in Titusville, Florida in January 2022
- Mission type: Weather and Meteorology
- Operator: NOAA / NASA
- COSPAR ID: 2022-021A
- SATCAT no.: 51850
- Mission duration: 15 years (planned); 3 years, 4 months, 3 days (elapsed)

Spacecraft properties
- Spacecraft: GOES
- Spacecraft type: GOES-R Series
- Bus: LM-A2100A
- Manufacturer: Lockheed Martin
- Launch mass: 5,192 kg (11,446 lb)
- Dry mass: 2,857 kg (6,299 lb)
- Dimensions: 6.1 × 5.6 × 3.9 m (20 × 18 × 13 ft)
- Power: 4 kW

Start of mission
- Launch date: 1 March 2022, 21:38 UTC
- Rocket: Atlas V 541
- Launch site: Cape Canaveral, SLC-41
- Contractor: United Launch Alliance
- Entered service: 3 January 2023

Orbital parameters
- Reference system: Geocentric orbit
- Regime: Geostationary orbit
- Longitude: 136.9° west
- Semi-major axis: 42,164.0 km (26,199.5 mi)
- Eccentricity: 0.0001730
- Perigee altitude: 35,957 km (22,343 mi)
- Apogee altitude: 35,972 km (22,352 mi)
- Inclination: 0.0558°
- Period: 24 hours
- Epoch: June 2, 2022
Instruments
- ABI: Advanced Baseline Imager
- GLM: Geostationary Lightning Mapper
- EXIS: Extreme Ultraviolet and X-ray Irradiance Sensors
- SUVI: Solar Ultraviolet Imager
- MAG: Magnetometer
- SEISS: Space Environment In-Situ Suite
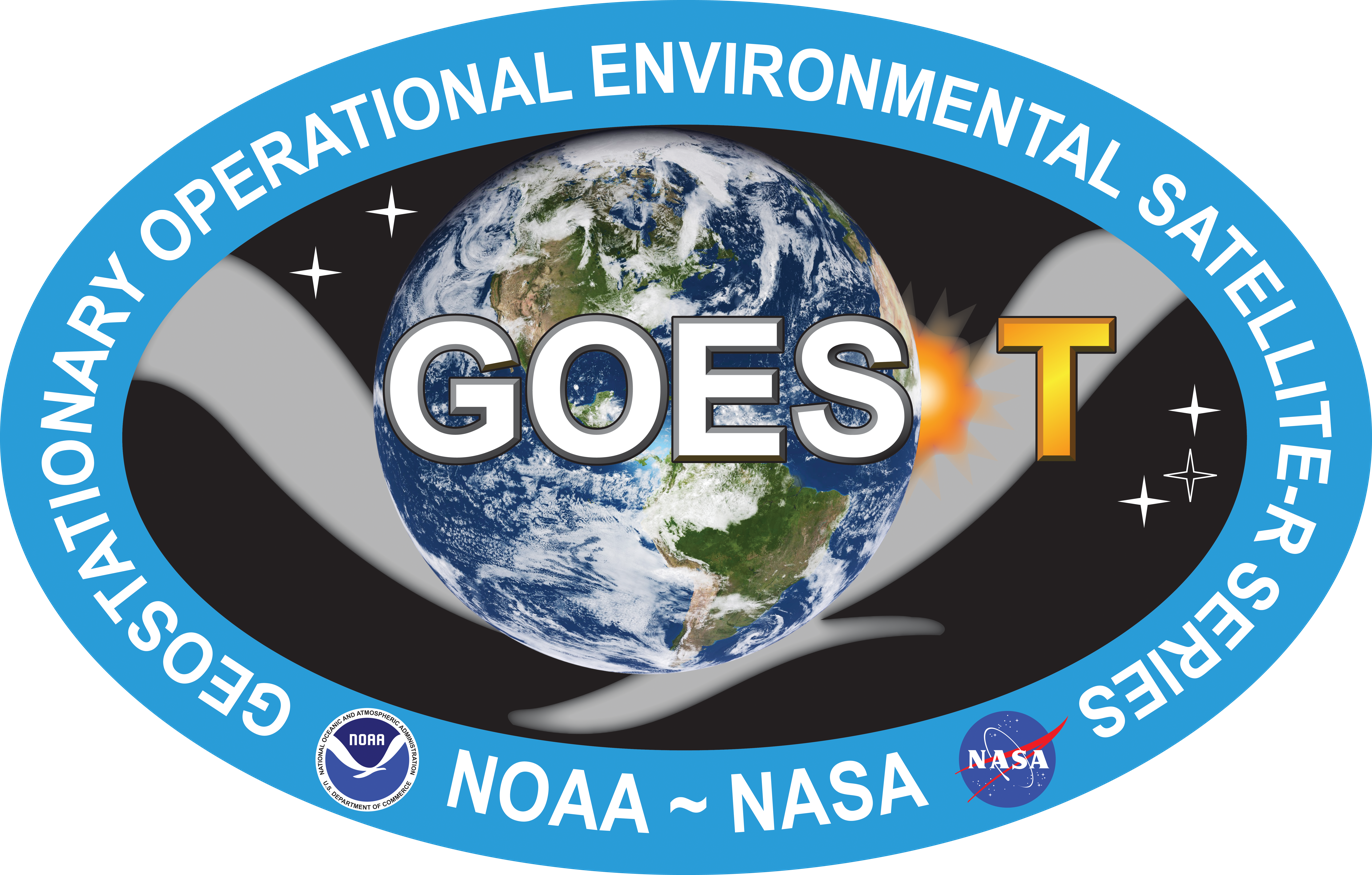
- GOES-T mission insignia GOES-R Series

GOES-18 (designated pre-launch as GOES-T) is the third of the "GOES-R Series", the current generation of weather satellites operated by the National Oceanic and Atmospheric Administration (NOAA). The current and next satellites of the Series (GOES-16, GOES-17, GOES-18, and GOES-19) will extend the availability of the Geostationary Operational Environmental Satellite (GOES) satellite system until 2037. The satellite is built by Lockheed Martin in Littleton, Colorado. It is based on the A2100A satellite bus and will have an expected useful life of 15 years (10 operational after five years in orbit replacement).

== Benefits and applications ==
- Better detection of heavy rainfall and flash flood risks
- Better fire detection and intensity estimation
- Better monitoring of smoke and dust
- Earlier warning of lightning ground strike hazards
- Improved air quality warnings and alerts
- Improved detection of low cloud / fog
- Improved transportation safety and aviation route planning
- Improved hurricane track and intensity forecasts
- Improved warning for communications and navigation disruptions and power blackouts
- Increased thunderstorm and tornado warning lead time
- More accurate monitoring of energetic particles responsible for radiation hazards

The GOES-R Series also continues the legacy Geostationary SAR (GEOSAR) function of the SARSAT system onboard NOAA's GOES satellites which has contributed to the rescue of thousands of individuals in distress. The GOES-R Series SARSAT transponder operates with a lower uplink power than the previous system, enabling GOES-R Series satellites to detect weaker beacon signals.

== Redesign ==
In May 2018, NOAA announced that the recently launched GOES-17 satellite was suffering from a severe malfunction in its instrument cooling system which resulted in degraded performance of its infrared sensors. The cause of the problem was determined to be with the loop heat pipe (LHP), which transports heat from the Advanced Baseline Imager (ABI) to a radiator for rejection into space. Since the LHP design was shared among all four GOES-R Series satellites, a redesign was required to prevent the anomaly from happening again on GOES-T and GOES-U. Lockheed Martin had already completed assembly of GOES-T and had to remove the ABI instrument in October 2018 and ship it to its manufacturer, Harris Corporation, to be rebuilt. (Note: The LHP was actually manufactured by Orbital ATK, which is now a part of Northrop Grumman, while the ABI was built by Exelis Inc., now a part of L3Harris Technologies.)

== Launch ==
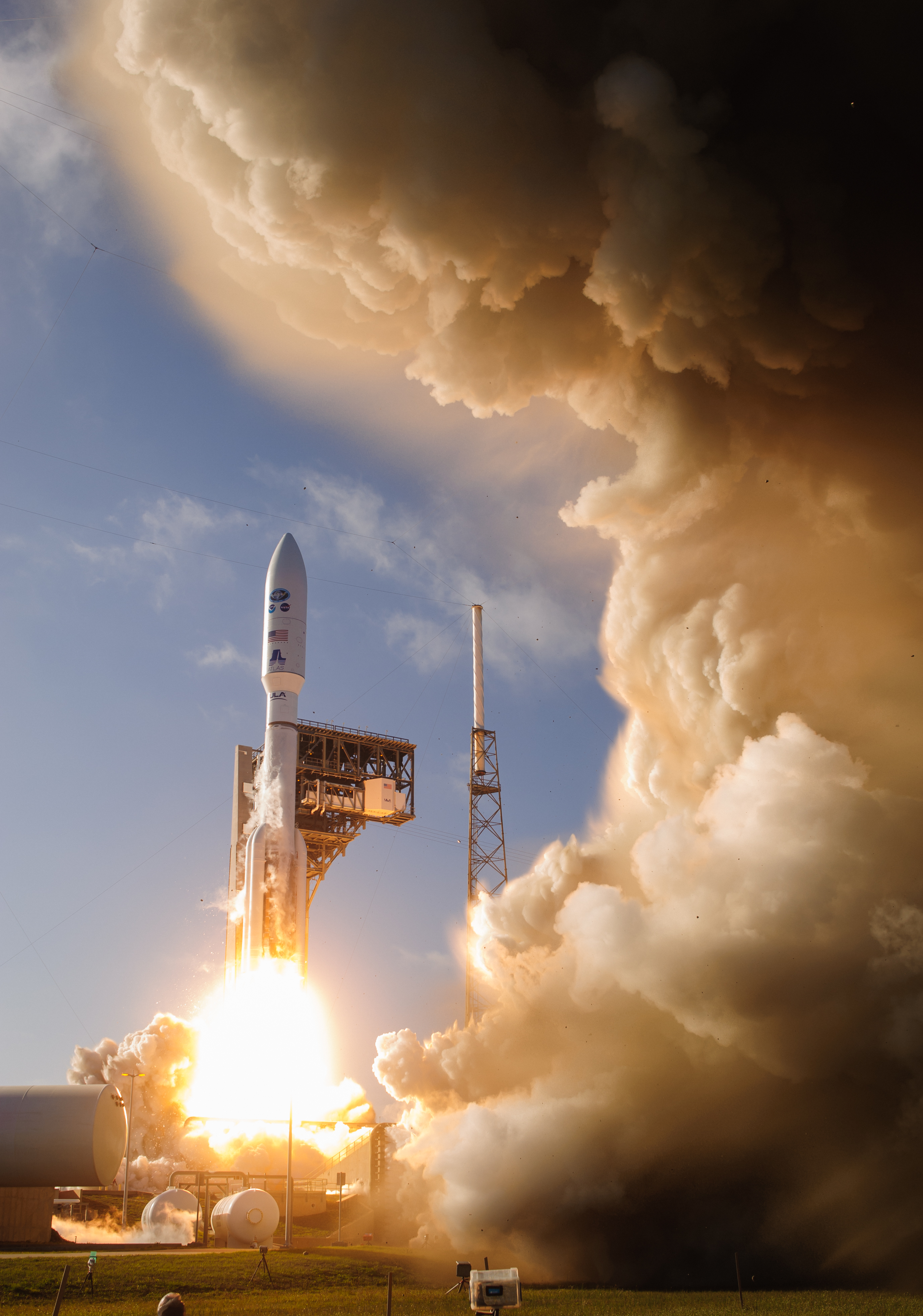
Launch of GOES-18

GOES-T was launched on March 1, 2022 from Cape Canaveral Space Force Station (CCSFS), Florida, United States. Because of the repairs to correct the loop heat pipe problem, the launch had slipped from its originally scheduled date of February 16, 2022.

GOES-T was renamed GOES-18 on March 14, 2022 after reaching geostationary orbit.

GOES-18 will undergo a "split" post-launch testing (PLT) phase that will get GOES-18 into position near the current GOES-West location in August 2022, so its Advanced Baseline Imager (ABI) data will be available for the "warm" period that degrades some GOES-17 imagery during the height of hurricane season.

The satellite was launched to the regular 89.5 degrees west checkout location and will undergo part one of PLT from this location. GOES-18 will then drift to 136.8 west and perform the remainder of PLT at that location near GOES-West. The 0.4 degree offset from GOES-17 will allow X-band RDL downlink from both GOES-17 and GOES-18. The 0.2 degree offset from 137.0W meet ground system product generation requirements. Both GOES-17 and GOES-18 images will be remapped to 137.0W.

The transition plan allows for early operational use of GOES-18 ABI data after Beta maturity is achieved and incorporates radio frequency conflict mitigation between GOES-17 and GOES-18 and telemetry and command uplinks and downlinks. Users will not need to repoint their antennas. GOES-18 ABI data will be available via a Cloud interface and interleaving with GOES-17 non-ABI product data.

After its operational transition, GOES-18 will be nudged over to the GOES-West position at 137.2W and GOES-17 will drift to 105W and placed in on-orbit storage. Assuming a normal launch and checkout, GOES-18 will transition to become the operational GOES-West satellite in early 2023.

NOAA announced plans to move the geostationary weather satellite into an operational role "as soon as possible" by ensuring GOES-T systems perform as expected before moving it into an operational role.

The ABI data of GOES-T is scheduled to be interleaved in GOES-17 data from August 1 to September 6 and October 15 to November 11, 2022, also the ABI warm periods of GOES-17. GOES-T became operational as GOES-West on January 4, 2023 joining GOES-16 (operating as GOES-East), while GOES-17 was moved to an intermediate position between the two to serve as backup.

The GOES-T launch was dedicated to Mark Timm, with the following message inscribed on the rocket fairing: "In memory of our colleague and friend - Mark Timm - The ULA Team"

== Imagery ==
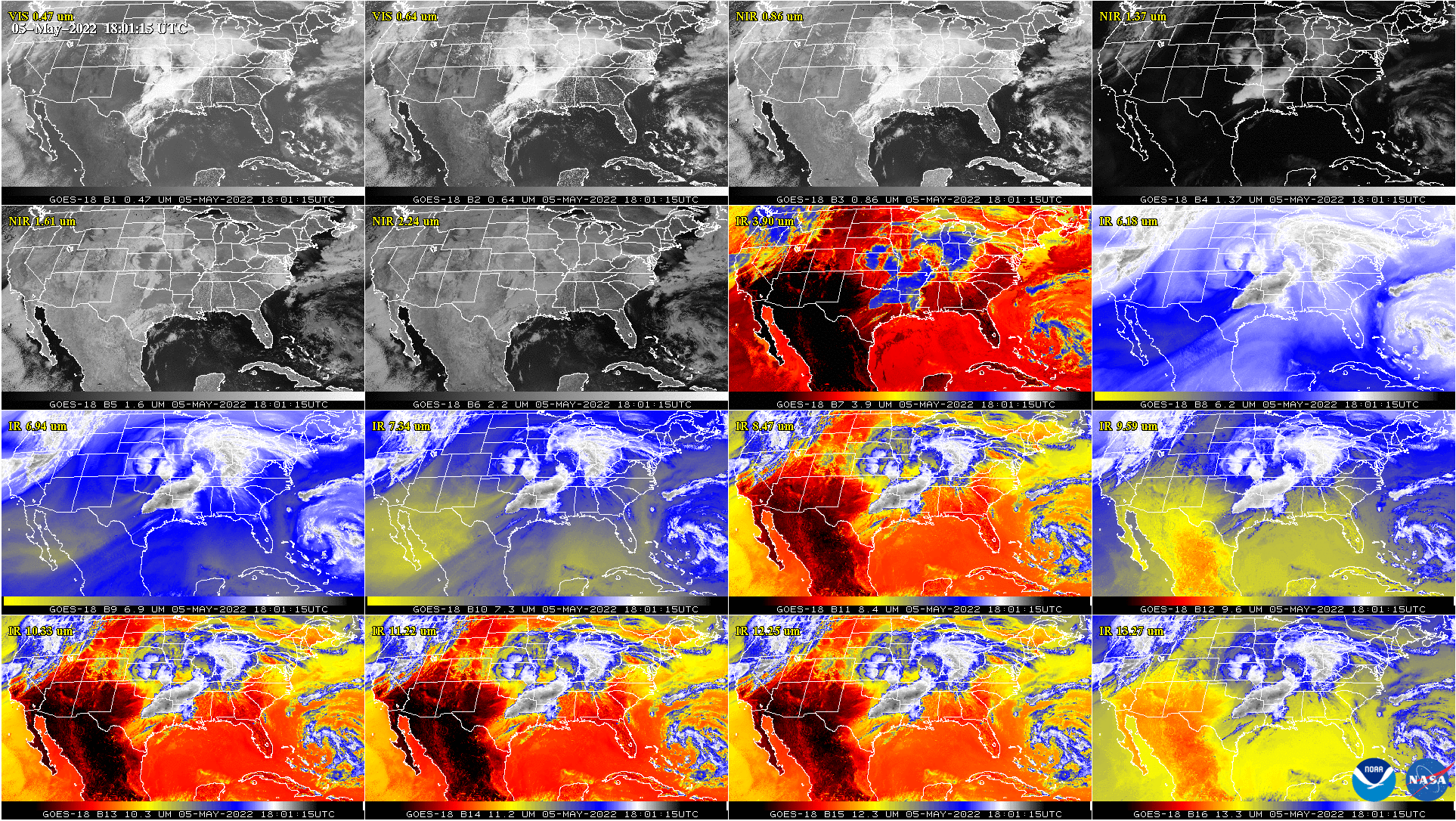
This GOES-18 image shows the contiguous United States observed by each of the ABI's 16 channels on May 5, 2022.

On May 11, 2022, NOAA shared the first images of the Western Hemisphere from its GOES-18 satellite. The satellite's Advanced Baseline Imager (ABI) instrument captured views of Earth. The ABI views Earth with sixteen different channels, each measuring energy at different wavelengths along the electromagnetic spectrum to obtain information about Earth's atmosphere, land, and ocean.

GOES-18 full disk GeoColor image from May 5, 2022

Data from multiple ABI channels can be combined to create imagery that approximates what the human eye would see from space. Combining data from different channels in different ways also allows meteorologists to highlight features of interest.
