= Dish Network =

American satellite TV provider

Dish Network LLC
- Logo since 2019

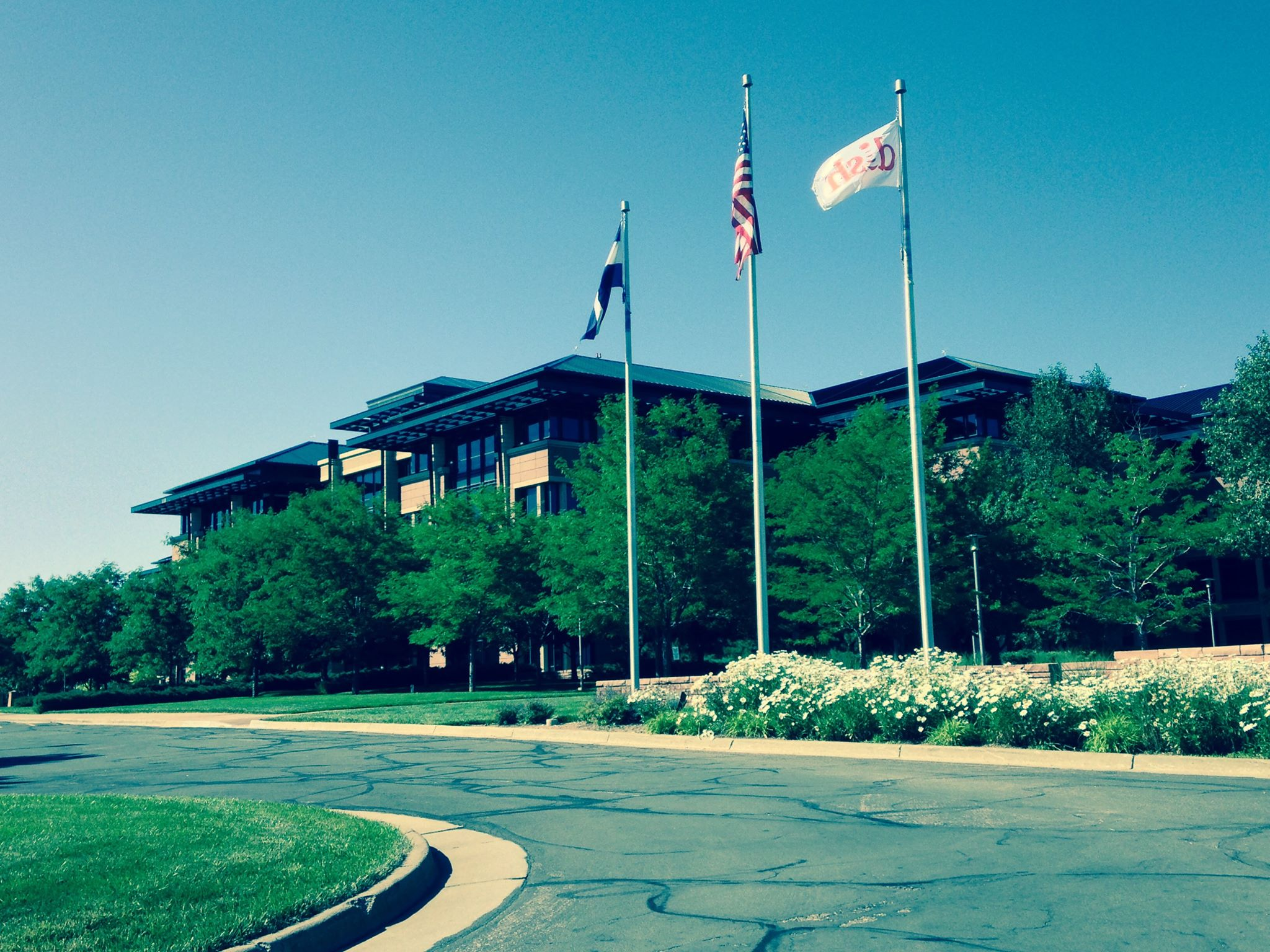
- Dish Network corporate headquarters
- Formerly: EchoStar Communications Corporation (1980–2007); DISH Network Corporation (2008–2023)
- Type: Subsidiary
- Traded as: Nasdaq: DISH
- Industry: Multichannel video programming distributor
- Predecessor: Voom HD Networks (satellite service)
- Founded: 1980; 46 years ago (as EchoStar Communications Corporation); January 1, 2008; 18 years ago (as Dish Network Corporation)
- Founders: Jim DeFranco; Charlie Ergen; Cantey Ergen
- Headquarters: Meridian, Colorado, U.S.
- Area served: United States
- Key people: Charlie Ergen (chairman); Hamid Akhavan (CEO)
- Products: Direct-broadcast satellite; Pay television; Pay-per-view; Over-the-top media services
- Number of employees: c. 14,200 (December 2022)
- Parent: EchoStar
- Subsidiaries: Sling TV; Blockbuster Video
- Website: dish.com

DISH Network LLC, often referred to as Dish, an abbreviation for Digital Sky Highway, formerly EchoStar Communications Corporation and DISH Network Corporation, is an American provider of satellite television and IPTV services and wholly owned subsidiary of EchoStar Corporation. Its primary competitor is DirecTV.

The company operates 4 office locations, 3 in Colorado, 1 in Arizona, including locations in Englewood (its headquarters), Denver, Littleton, and Phoenix.

The company was originally established as EchoStar Communications, and first launched its satellite television services under the DISH Network brand in 1996, utilizing its EchoStar I satellite. In 2007, EchoStar spun off its infrastructural business and the brand itself under a separate entity under the EchoStar name with the existing company rebranding to DISH Network Corporation. Both companies would remain under the control of EchoStar's co-founder Charlie Ergen.

After the spin-off, the company pursued further acquisitions and business initiatives, including acquiring video rental chain Blockbuster in an attempt to compete with Netflix, releasing a new set-top digital video recorder (DVR) with the controversial ability to automatically skip commercials in recordings. In 2015, the company launched over-the-top IPTV services via the new subsidiary Sling TV. In 2020, the company acquired the mobile virtual network operator (MVNO) Boost Mobile from Sprint Corporation as part of its merger with T-Mobile US, announcing an intent to develop a national 5G network in order to supplant Sprint as a fourth major carrier.

In 2023, DISH Network was merged back into EchoStar in an all-stock transaction.

== History ==
Original logo as EchoStar Communications used from 1980 to 2007.

Dish Network brand logo used by EchoStar from 2000 to 2005.

=== Founding, early growth and launch of DBS services ===
The company was formed in 1980 as EchoStar Communications by Charlie Ergen, Candy Ergen, and Jim DeFranco, as a distributor of C-band satellite television systems. In 1987, EchoStar applied for a satellite television broadcast license with the FCC and was granted access to orbital slot 119° west longitude in 1992. A year after the launch of its first satellite, EchoStar I, EchoStar launched its DBS broadcast services under the DISH Network name on March 4, 1996. That launch marked the beginning of its television services under a subscription business model.

=== Spin-off of infrastructural assets ===
In January 2007, EchoStar Communications completed the corporate spin-off of its technology and infrastructure assets into a separate company under the EchoStar name, and the remainder of the company was renamed DISH Network Corporation.

=== Acquisitions and expansion ===
Joseph Clayton became president and chief executive officer of the company in June 2011, while Charlie Ergen remained chairman. Clayton remained in the position until March 31, 2015, when he retired, leaving Ergen to resume the post. In December 2017, Ergen was replaced by Erik Carlson. In 2011, DISH Network spent over $3 billion in acquisitions of companies in bankruptcy, This included the April 6, 2011, purchase of Blockbuster in a bankruptcy auction for $322 million in cash and the assumption of $87 million in liabilities. DISH Network also acquired DBSD and TerreStar Corporation.

In September 2011, DISH would leverage Blockbuster's existing video on-demand and DVD-by-mail services as part of a new offering known as "Blockbuster Movie Pass"—an add-on for DISH Network television service incorporating movie channels, access to Blockbuster On Demand, and DVD-by-mail with unlimited in-store exchanges. The offering was positioned as a competitor to Netflix, and Redbox, with Blockbuster having touted that it received new releases for rental sooner than its competitors due to agreements they had reached requiring a 28-day delay. DISH Network also made a bid to purchase Hulu in October 2011, but Hulu's owners chose not to sell the company.

In January 2013, DISH bid $5 billion for Clearwire to add wireless internet and mobile video services. In April 2013, it made a $25 billion bid for Sprint Corporation. In 2011, Dish petitioned the Federal Communications Commission to combine the S-Band spectrum it acquired from DBSD and Terrestar, and combine this spectrum with LTE. Unlike LightSquared, Dish's spectrum has minimal risk of disrupting Global Positioning Systems.

At the 2012 Consumer Electronics Show, DISH Network announced it would shorten its trade name to "DISH", to emphasize new developments such as its Hopper DVR and broadband services.

After changing the position of a satellite orbital position from being over Mexico to Brazil in 2011, DISH sought companies that could make a deal, among them Telefónica. However, nothing ever came of this, and DISH decided to enter the country itself. According to the Brazilian Agency of Telecommunications (Anatel), they awaited the authorization of the application. In June 2019, nonetheless, DISH TV accepted to resign its satellite exploration rights assigned to EchoStar and thus ending the possibility of entering the Brazilian market.

In January 2015, the company launched a subsidiary, Sling TV—an IPTV service distributed as an over-the-top media service.

In 2019, EchoStar transferred the portion of its business which managed and provided broadcast satellite services, referred to as the BSS (Broadcast Satellite Services) business, to DISH to concentrate on broadband services and other initiatives.

==== Wireless ====
Logo used by DISH Wireless prior to its discontinuance as a distinct brand.

In 2019, as part of the merger of Sprint Corporation and T-Mobile US, DISH reached an agreement to acquire Sprint's prepaid wireless businesses, including Boost Mobile, in order to quell antitrust concerns. After the merger was approved by the Justice Department, DISH stated that it intended to supplant Sprint as a fourth major national wireless carrier, and had committed to building out a 5G network serving at least 70% of the U.S. population by June 2023. As part of the agreement, DISH would receive access to the T-Mobile network for seven years while it builds out its 5G-specific network. The $1.4 billion sale was completed on July 1, 2020.

With this purchase it officially launched its wireless business, DISH Wireless, offering prepaid service through the Boost brand as an MVNO on the T-Mobile network. DISH stated intentions to offer branded postpaid service in the future with the build-out of their own network.

DISH purchased Ting Mobile from Tucows on August 1, 2020, Republic Wireless on March 8, 2021, and Gen Mobile on September 1, 2021. On July 19, 2021, DISH announced a 10-year, non-exclusive agreement with AT&T Mobility for 4G and 5G roaming on its network, accompanying the existing T-Mobile agreement. The $5 billion deal also includes sharing of DISH wireless spectrum with AT&T.

In May 2022, DISH Wireless began to launch its self-developed 5G network, codenamed "Project Genesis", in Las Vegas; the company stated that it planned to serve at least 120 cities by the June 2023 deadline. In June 2022, DISH announced it had met a milestone requiring it to provide coverage to 20% of the U.S. population by June 2022. In December 2022, DISH Wireless launched a postpaid service under the spin-off brand Boost Infinite. In June 2023, the company announced that it had met the requirement to provide coverage to 70% of the U.S. population by June 14, 2023.

==== EchoStar merger ====
In August 2023, EchoStar announced that it would buy back DISH Network in an all-stock purchase, undoing their previous split. The acquisition, which was completed December 31, 2023, was part of an effort to bolster the company's wireless business, with Ergen stating that it would allow them to offer "an enhanced consumer connectivity business". As Ergen already held 90% of the voting stock in both companies, the FCC considered the "acquisition" to be a reorganization of assets with no change in effective control.

In July 2024, amid declines in subscribers, Boost Mobile underwent a relaunch with an updated brand identity, and Boost Infinite merged into the Boost Mobile business as part of a new plan lineup. EchoStar began referring to its 5G wireless network as the "Boost Mobile Network" and discontinued its usage of the DISH Wireless brand.

On June 6, 2025, it was reported that EchoStar Corporation was preparing to file for Chapter 11 bankruptcy protection after the Federal Communications Commission (FCC) suspended EchoStar's ability to plan out strategic decisions for its Boost Mobile subsidiary. In addition, other factors contributing to this decision included missing over $500 million in interest payments and the termination of the Dish Network acquisition by DirecTV.

On June 29, 2026, EchoStar announced that Dish DBS, which operates Dish Network's satellite pay-TV business, as well as Sling TV and Boost Mobile, would file for Chapter 11 bankruptcy protection by June 30. EchoStar blamed the decision on heavy debt and subscriber losses, as well as legal troubles with federal regulators on whether it has met obligations to deploy wireless spectrum licenses. On June 30, Dish DBS filed for prepackaged Chapter 11 bankruptcy in Texas, listing assets and liabilities between $10 billion and $50 billion. The filing allows for Dish to pay its debt obligations and complete the transition of its Dish Wireless, which is doing business as Boost Mobile, following spectrum transactions. Dish plans to emerge from bankruptcy by the third quarter of 2026 with plans to wind down operations at Dish Wireless.

==== Attempted acquisition by DirecTV ====
On September 30, 2024, DirecTV announced its intent to acquire DISH Network, under an arrangement under which TPG Inc. will acquire the remaining stake of DirecTV it does not already own from AT&T, and then acquire DISH Network's video business from Echostar for $1 while assuming its net debt. The combined company would have had a total of approximately 20 million television subscribers. DirecTV stated that it had no plans for any changes to the DISH or SlingTV services following the purchase. The sale comes amid declines in both services' customer bases amid cord-cutting and other factors. EchoStar CEO Hamid Akhavan stated that the agreement would allow the company to place a larger focus on expanding its wireless Boost Mobile network. In November, DirecTV abandoned the deal due to opposition from EchoStar's bondholders.

== Criticism and legal issues ==
DISH and its subsidiaries have faced legal action for some of its questionable practices, including fines for telemarketing tactics such as failure to disclose fees with full transparency. In 2012, DISH and a group of the United States' major television networks filed lawsuits over "AutoHop", a feature in its recently released Hopper set-top boxes that allowed users to detect and automatically skip commercials in their recordings. DISH later reached agreements with ABC, CBS, and Fox, under which it agreed to disable the feature for a certain window of time after a program's first airing.

In 2023 DISH was fined $150,000 by the FCC for failing to de-orbit its EchoStar VII satellite according to the terms of its license; this was the first fine ever issued to a company over the matter of "space debris".

=== Removal of regional sports programming ===
Dish Network has always refused to carry some of the higher-priced regional sports networks, most notably AT&T SportsNet Southwest, YES Network, and Spectrum SportsNet, which have never been available on Dish. The contract of the entire MSG Network had ended on October 1, 2010, early; CSN New England was dropped on August 6, 2014. In July 2019, Dish removed the entire slate of Fox Sports Networks channels (which have since been twice re-branded first as Bally Sports and then FanDuel Sports Network). This was the beginning of a trend with Altitude being removed in August and NBC Sports Chicago in October of that year. On April 1, 2021, Dish removed the remaining NBC Sports Regional Networks and the Mid-Atlantic Sports Network. Dish Network president Brian Neylon commented that "The current RSN model is fundamentally broken,” stating that he was in favor of offering the networks as an a la carte service. Six months later on October 1, 2021, Dish removed the entire AT&T SportsNet network of channels. In 2022, Dish, alongside Sling made The Walt Disney Company pull their programming from the services. This was only temporary, as they got brought back later. They had previously been pulled from YouTube TV in 2021, and were pulled from Spectrum for ten days in early-September 2023.

The last remaining regional sports network, NESN, was removed from DISH on December 20, 2021.

=== 2023 ransomware attack ===
In February 2023, Dish Network suffered a major ransomware attack which resulted in internal outages, loss of service at subsidiary companies such as Boost Mobile, and data theft. The company had to retain outside experts to resolve the issue, and the news caused a slide in the company's share price to a 14-year-low. Service outages lasted for more than a month, with customers reporting wait times for customer service stretching to more than 14 hours. In the aftermath of the ransomware attack, Dish Network was criticized for lack of transparency or communication with its customers.

== Services and devices ==
Year	Subscribers
1996	350,000
1997	1,040,000
1998	1,900,000
1999	3,400,000
2000	5,260,000
2001	6,830,000
2002	8,180,000
2003	9,425,000
2004	10,905,000
2005	12,040,000
2006	13,105,000
2007	13,780,000
2008	13,678,000
2009	14,100,000
2010	14,133,000
2011	13,967,000
2012	14,056,000
2013	14,057,000
2014	13,978,000
2015	13,897,000
2016	13,671,000
2017	13,242,000
2018	12,322,000
2019	11,986,000
2020	11,290,000
2021	10,707,000
2022	10,018,000

DISH's main service is satellite television and its offerings are comparable to other satellite and cable companies. Viewers can choose from a series of service bundles, paying more money for more channels. A la carte programming is available, however limited to premium channels such as HBO or Showtime. The company is currently working on diversifying its offerings. With its purchase of Blockbuster LLC, DISH owns the Blockbuster trademarks and has used its intellectual property agreement to offer streaming and mail-order video services.

=== DishNET ===
On September 27, 2012, DISH Network announced a satellite broadband service called DishNET, aimed at rural areas where cable is often not available.

=== OnTech Smart Services ===
DISH launched the direct-to-consumer smart home technology brand OnTech Smart Services in 2019; initially available in 11 metropolitan areas, the brand offers smart home devices and installation services.

=== Blockchain and cryptocurrency ===
DISH has been described as the first large company to accept cryptocurrency and being “comfortable with cryptocurrency”. The company has accepted Bitcoin since 2014. Four years later it began accepting Bitcoin Cash. In September 2021, it announced a partnership with Input Output Global (formerly known as IOHK) to build subscription services based on the Cardano blockchain. The following month it set up a system to expand 5G mobile network through customers using the Citizens Broadband Radio Service with rewards paid in cryptocurrency.

=== Charitable causes ===
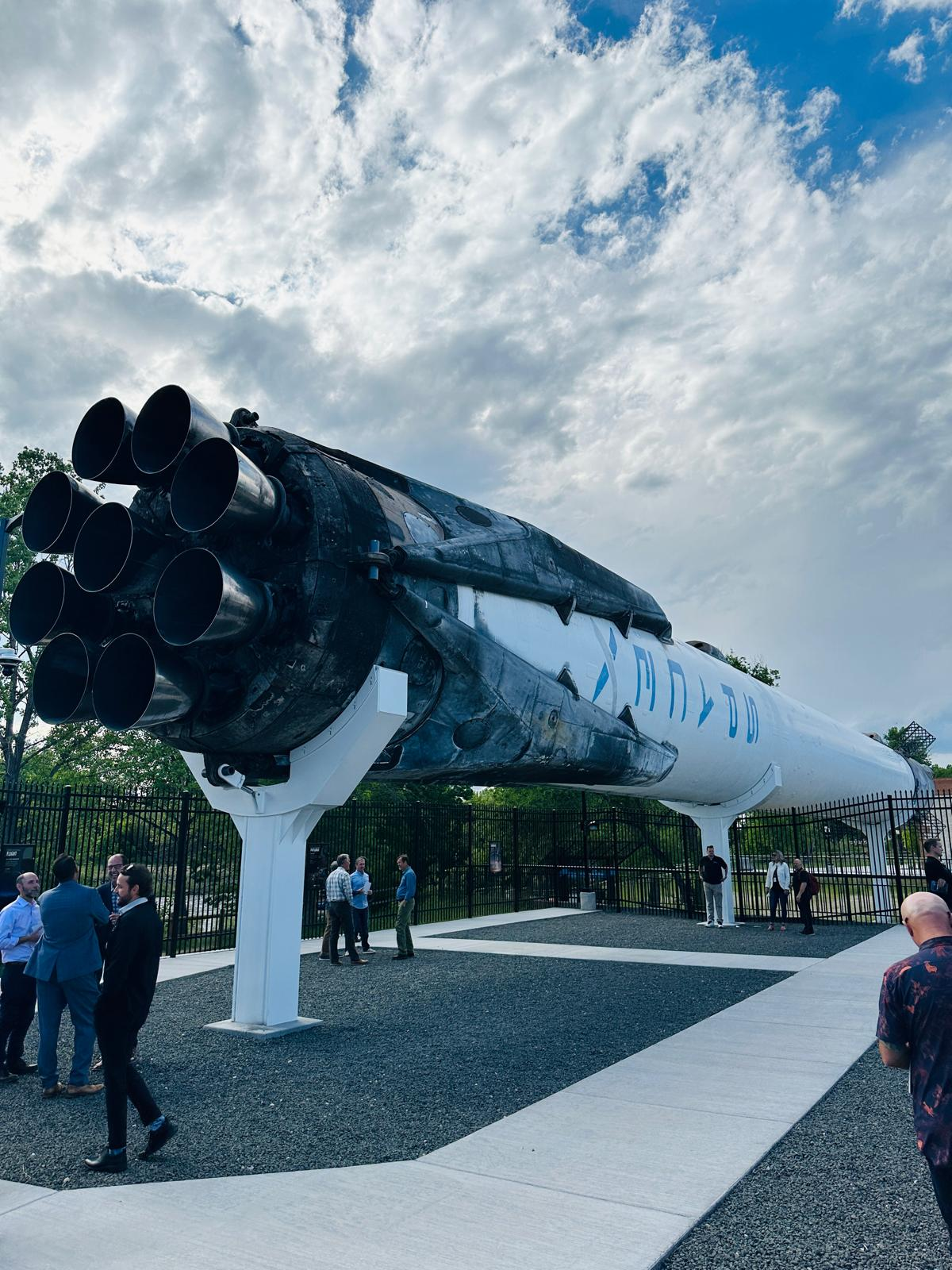
Falcon 9 Rocket Booster opened for general public at Dish Network's Littleton, CO office is a type of reusable rocket that SpaceX used for repeated launches

DISH Cares was launched in 2014 and focuses on community engagement, sustainability, and providing services following disasters. The company has engaged in disaster relief efforts, including after Hurricanes Katrina, Harvey, Irma, and Maria.

== Technical information ==
Both a standard receiver and a receiver with built-in digital video recorder (DVR) were available to subscribers. The DISH Network ViP722 HD DVR replacement for the ViP622 received generally positive reviews. It could record up to 350 hours of standard-definition (SD) broadcasts, or 55 hours of high-definition (HD). These set-top boxes (STBs) allow for HD on the primary TV and SD on the secondary TV (TV2) without a secondary box on TV2.

=== Receivers and devices ===
==== Earlier satellite dishes ====
DISH Network's first satellite antenna was simply called the "DISH Network" dish. It was retroactively named the "DISH 300" when legal and satellite problems forced delays of the forthcoming DISH 500 systems. It uses one LNB to obtain signals from the 119°W orbital location, and was commonly used as a second dish to receive additional high-definition or international programming from either the 148°W or 61.5°W orbital locations. The 119°W slot is one of two primary orbital locations, the other being 110°W, that provide core services.

==== Tailgater ====
The Tailgater is a portable satellite antenna; the tailgater can be purchased as a standalone device for $350. The Tailgater is compatible with the Wally and VIP211 receivers. Customers only need to pay for the period of time where the receiver is active on the account, the monthly cost for a Vip211 or Wally is $7 per month, if the receiver is the only one on the account, there is no charge. It weighs ten pounds, is protected from weather, and automatically searches for a signal. The only satellites that are currently compatible with the Tailgater are at DISH's 119 (SD/HD TV), 110 (SD/HD TV), and 129 (SD/HD TV) orbital slots.

==== Hopper and Joey ====
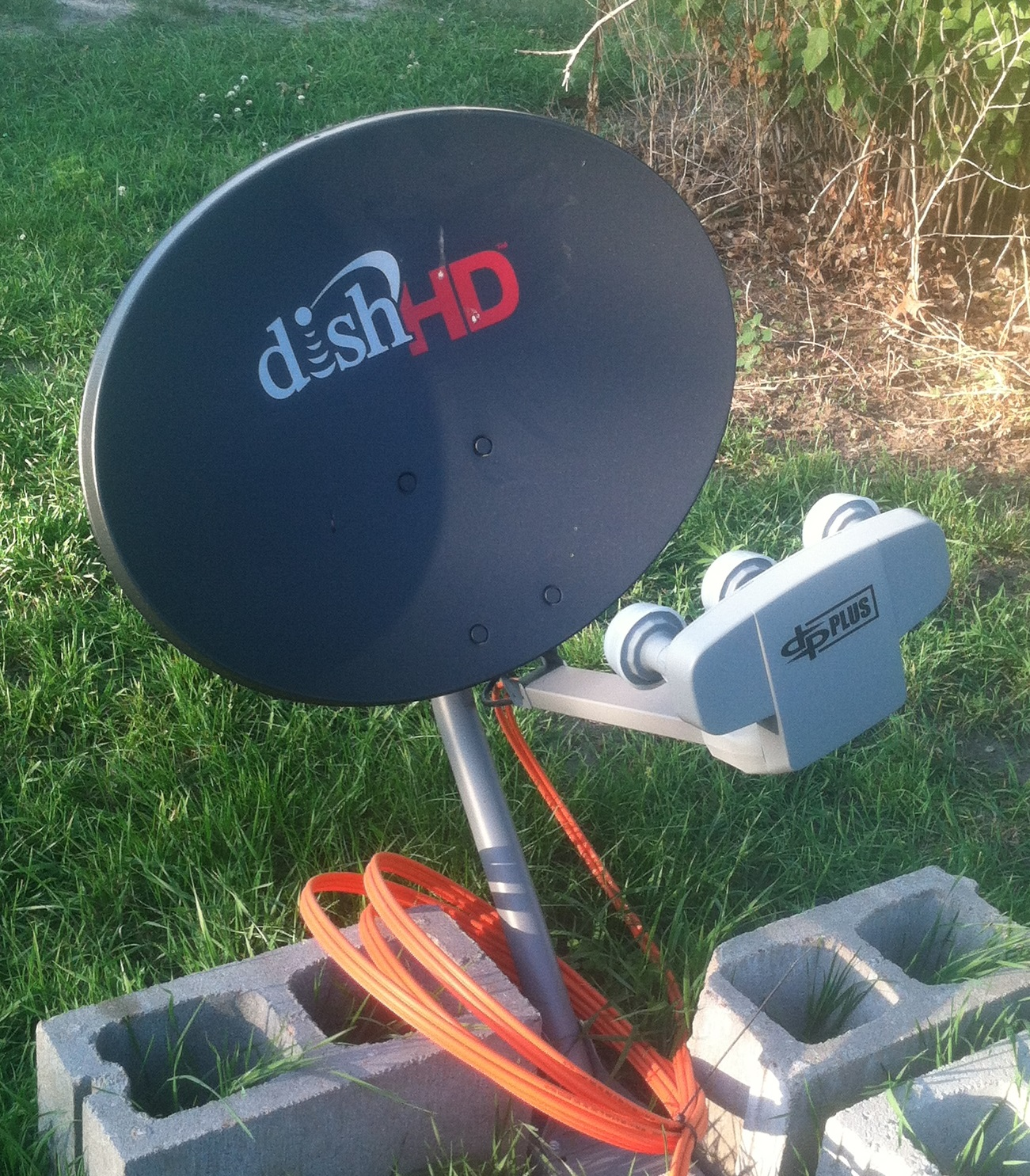
DISH HD, newest version used with the Hopper and Joey system

Hopper is a line of multi-tuner set-top boxes first introduced in 2012; they are digital video recorders that can be networked with accompanying "Joey" set-top boxes for multi-room access to recordings. DISH Network subsequently introduced updated versions of the Hopper, including Hopper with Sling (which adds integrated placeshifting capabilities), the Hopper 3, and the Hopper Plus which features 4K support and 16 tuners. Hopper supports a voice-activated remote, as well as Amazon Echo and Google Home integration.

=== Apps ===
DISH Anywhere

DISH Anywhere is DISH's subscriber-only streaming video service. The DISH Anywhere app combines Sling broadcast technology and internet to bring subscribers DISH content wherever they are. It also pairs with DISH On Demand, a library that has over 80,000 movies and shows.

As of late 2018, HBO and Cinemax were no longer available for DISH customers due to Contract disputes. However, Dish returned HBO and Cinemax programming as of August 2021.

==== Sling TV ====
In May 2012, DISH launched DISHWorld, a subscription-based over-the-top streaming IPTV service, as an app on Roku devices, offering access to over 50 international television channels via broadband streaming.

In 2014, DISH Network began to reach carriage deals with broadcasters for a new over-the-top service that would be aimed towards cord cutters as a low-cost alternative to traditional pay television. On January 5, 2015, DISH Network officially unveiled Sling TV, an over-the-top IPTV service designed to complement subscription video on-demand services such as Hulu and Netflix.

Some broadcasters have been hesitant about over-the-top services such as Sling TV, showing concern that they may undermine their carriage deals with larger conventional cable, satellite and Internet TV providers. Time Warner initially noted that the carriage of its channels on the service was only for a "trial" basis, while both Time Warner's CEO Jeffrey Bewkes and an analyst from the firm Macquarie Capital disclosed that current contract language in DISH's OTT carriage deals with the service's content distributors would cap the number of subscribers that the service is allowed to have at any given time to 5 million. Neither DISH Network or its content providers have confirmed any such cap. As of January 2022, the service has reached 2.49 million subscribers.

=== Satellite fleet ===
Until 2019, most of the satellites used by DISH Network were owned and operated by EchoStar Corporation. DISH frequently moves satellites among its many orbiting slots so this list may not be accurate. Refer to Lyngsat and DISH Channel Chart for detailed satellite information.

DISH Network satellites
Satellite	Location (degrees west)	Launched	Type	Notes
EchoStar I	77	December 28, 1995	Lockheed Martin Astro Space Series 7000 (AS-7000)	Can carry a limited number of services on odd numbered transponders. DISH is not licensed to serve CONUS customers in the United States from this location but may transmit local stations.
EchoStar II	148	September 10, 1996	Ariane 4	On 14 July 2008, EchoStar reported to the SEC that EchoStar II "experienced a substantial failure that appears to have rendered the satellite a total loss". Retired in mid-2008.
EchoStar III	61.5	October 5, 1997	Lockheed Martin Missiles and Space A2100AX	Replaced by EchoStar XV and was serving as an in-orbit spare. Placed on graveyard orbit by September 6, 2017.
EchoStar IV	77	May 8, 1998	Lockheed Martin Missiles and Space A2100AX	This satellite had a launch issue, is now in an inclined orbit and is not currently operational. It largely serves as a placeholder for EchoStar slots.
EchoStar V	Deorbited from 148	September 23, 1999	Space Systems/Loral FS-1300	EchoStar V was moved from 110 to 129 and finally to 148. International programming at 148 has moved to Anik F3/118.75°. Locals have moved to spot beams at other locations. The satellite was to serve as a placeholder for EchoStar at the 148 slot. The satellite was experiencing stability issues that made signal levels unstable for the short time it was located at 148. On July 31, 2009, all remaining programming at 148 ceased. Factors now indicate discontinuation of the 148 slot, at least for the short term, 3–4 years.
EchoStar VI	77	July 14, 2000	Space Systems/Loral FS-1300	Replaces EchoStar VIII.
EchoStar VII	119	February 21, 2002	Lockheed Martin Missiles and Space A2100AX	Currently an on orbit spare. Provides DISH Network's spot beam services to the western United States, as well as Muzak programming to businesses on leased bandwidth.
EchoStar VIII	77	August 21, 2002	Space Systems/Loral FS-1300	Formerly at 110. On January 30, 2011, the satellite experienced a single event upset and drifted out of its intended orbit, this required all services to be relocated to other available satellite capacity in the Eastern Arc. One week later some services were restored, but the satellite is expected to be taken out of service again and replaced temporarily by EchoStar VI in order to conduct further testing.
EchoStar X	110	February 15, 2006	Lockheed Martin Missiles and Space A2100AXS	First seen functioning May 2006 in the 110.0W slot and is still transmitting from the same location as of October 2016.
EchoStar XI	110	July 16, 2008	Space Systems/Loral LS-1300	
EchoStar XII	61.5	July 17, 2003	Lockheed Martin AS-2100	Originally known as Rainbow 1, this satellite was launched by Cablevision/Rainbow DBS and used for the Voom DBS service at 61.5° W until the satellite and transponder licenses were sold to EchoStar in 2005. Renamed EchoStar 12 in March 2006. Currently only used for spot beam capabilities.
Echostar XIV	119	March 20, 2010	Space Systems/Loral FS-1300	Replaced Echostar VII. EchoStar XIV launched on an International Launch Services Proton/Breeze M vehicle from the Baikonur Cosmodrome in Kazakhstan. Resides at an altitude of 22,000 miles.
EchoStar XV	61.5	July 10, 2010	Space Systems/Loral FS-1300	A CONUS only satellite.
Anik F3	118.75	April 12, 2007	Astrium Eurostar 3000	Customers use the 36 inch DISH 500+ or DISH 1000+ to receive this non-DBS, medium-powered signal. Anik F3 is leased by DISH from Telesat Canada to serve CONUS customers. It broadcasts on non-DBS FSS frequencies (~11.7–12.2 GHz) using circular polarity (the only satellite serving the United States in this mode). It permanently replaces AMC-16, which was temporarily placed at 118.75° W due to delays in Anik F3 production. AMC-16 moved back to 85° W when Anik F3 was fully operational. A primarily international satellite with international channels once on 61.5, 121, or 148.
Ciel-2	129	December 10, 2008	Thales Alenia Space Spacebus-4000C4	Replaced EchoStar V at the 129°W orbital location. Owned by Canadian Ciel Satellite Group, DISH leased the entire bandwidth of the Ciel-2 satellite. Used to provide national HD programming and HD spot beam locals. DISH discontinued use of orbital 129 in July 2023 and has moved all programming from this orbital over to 119 and 110
Nimiq 5	72.7	September 17, 2009	Space Systems/Loral LS-1300	A Canadian satellite operated by Telesat Canada. DISH leases the satellite's capacity.

== See also ==
- Bell Satellite TV, formerly Dish Network Canada
- Dish México
- DishHD (subsidiary Dish HD Asia serves China and Taiwan)
- List of multiple-system operators
- List of United States pay television channels
