= SuperDish =

Satellite dish by DISH Network

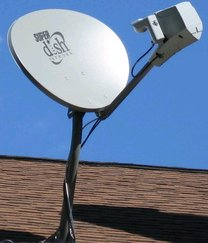
DISH Network's Super Dish 121 mounted on a rooftop.

The Super Dish is a satellite dish deployed by DISH Network in November 2003.

== Technology ==
The Super Dish has a dish shaped reflector that is 36" x 20". It receives signals from three orbiting satellites. The Super Dish Provides local channels from the K_{u} band from SES Americom's AMC-15 satellite. It also provides local and international channels from EchoStar 9, which is also known as Galaxy 23/EchoStar 9 due to a joint partnership with Intelsat.

These two satellite services, and their older Fixed Service Satellite technology, were added to provide additional capacity that allows the DISH Network to complete the Federal Communications Commission's "must-carry" requirements for local channels, and make room for HDTV channels. The Super Dish receives standard Direct broadcast satellite (DBS) services in circular polarization at 12.7 GHz from EchoStar's existing 110°W and 119°W slots. The 105°W and 121°W slots are received in same-frequency EM at 11.7 GHz at a lower power. Consequently, Super Dish-compatible receivers are capable of receiving both circularly-polarized and linearly-polarized signals across two distinct frequency bands, originating from as many as four satellites.

== Services ==
Local channels in most major cities were available as digital broadcasts over DISH Network using Super Dish, but HDTV has since been moved to the 61.5 and 129 satellites.

In 2007, most of the services at the 121° location were moved to the Anik F3 satellite at the 118.75° location. Existing Super Dish subscribers were retrofitted with a "repoint kit" to receive most of the same services via the Anik F3 satellite, also in the medium-power FSS band.

Business services were provided to several commercial customers, including many Wachovia Bank branches. These Wachovia branches, now owned by Wells Fargo, can still be seen with a Super Dish installed, through which they receive the "Wells Fargo TV" service.
