= EchoStar XIV =

Communications satellite

- Mission type: Communication
- Operator: EchoStar
- COSPAR ID: 2010-010A
- SATCAT no.: 36499
- Mission duration: 15 years planned

Spacecraft properties
- Bus: LS-1300
- Manufacturer: Space Systems/Loral
- Launch mass: 6,384 kilograms (14,074 lb)

Start of mission
- Launch date: 20 March 2010, 18:26:57 UTC
- Rocket: Proton-M/Briz-M
- Launch site: Baikonur 200/39
- Contractor: ILS

Orbital parameters
- Reference system: Geocentric
- Regime: Geostationary
- Longitude: 119° West
- Perigee altitude: 35,782 kilometers (22,234 mi)
- Apogee altitude: 35,803 kilometers (22,247 mi)
- Inclination: 0.01 degrees
- Period: 23.93 hours
- Epoch: 25 December 2013, 09:24:45 UTC

Transponders
- Band: 103 J band (IEEE K_{u} band)

EchoStar XIV is an American geostationary communications satellite which is operated by EchoStar. It is positioned in geostationary orbit at a longitude of 119° West, from where it is used to provide high-definition television direct broadcasting services to the continental United States for Dish Network.

EchoStar XIV was built by Space Systems/Loral, and is based on the LS-1300 satellite bus. It is equipped with 103 J band (IEEE K_{u} band) transponders, and at launch it had a mass of 6,384 kilograms (14,074 lb), with an expected operational lifespan of around 15 years.

The launch of EchoStar XIV was conducted by International Launch Services, using a Proton-M carrier rocket with a Briz-M upper stage. The launch occurred from Site 200/39 at the Baikonur Cosmodrome in Kazakhstan, at 18:26:57 UTC on 20 March 2010. The launch successfully placed EchoStar XIV into a geosynchronous transfer orbit. Following separation from the rocket, it manoeuvered into a geostationary orbit with a perigee of 35,785 kilometres (22,236 mi) and an apogee of 35,789 kilometres (22,238 mi).

== See also ==
- 2010 in spaceflight
