= AMC-18 =

Communications satellite launchedin 2006

- Names: GE-18
- Mission type: Communications
- Operator: SES Americom (2006–2009); SES World Skies (2009–2011); SES (2011–present)
- COSPAR ID: 2006-054B
- SATCAT no.: 29644
- Website: SES
- Mission duration: 15 years (planned); 19 years, 3 months, 16 days (elapsed)

Spacecraft properties
- Spacecraft: GE-18
- Spacecraft type: Lockheed Martin A2100
- Bus: LM-A2100A
- Manufacturer: Lockheed Martin
- Launch mass: 2,081 kg (4,588 lb)

Start of mission
- Launch date: 8 December 2006, 22:08 UTC
- Rocket: Ariane 5ECA (VA174)
- Launch site: Centre Spatial Guyanais, ELA-3
- Contractor: Arianespace
- Entered service: February 2007

Orbital parameters
- Reference system: Geocentric orbit
- Regime: Geostationary orbit
- Longitude: 83° West

Transponders
- Band: 24 C-band
- Bandwidth: 36 MHz
- Coverage area: Canada, United States, Mexico, Caribbean

AMC-18 is a geostationary Lockheed Martin A2100A communications satellite owned by SES Americom. It was launched on 8 December 2006 from Centre Spatial Guyanais aboard an Ariane 5 ECA launch vehicle and is situated at 83° West longitude, providing coverage of North America with twenty-four C-band transponders of 12–18 watts each. Future users in May 2007 include The CW Television Network, NASA TV and Canadian Broadcasting Corporation, among other services.

AMC-18 is used by thousands of terrestrial radio stations for network feeds using ground equipment from Starguide, X-Digital Systems, Wegener and International Datacasting. Major tenants are Cumulus Media Networks Satellite Services (which includes Citadel Media, Westwood One Networks, Talk Radio Network, WOR Radio Network and others), Skyview Networks (which includes ABC News, ABC Radio, California News Network, Arizona News Network, numerous Professional and Collegian Sports networks, and others), Orbital Media Networks (which includes United Stations Radio Networks, John Tesh, and others), Premiere Radio Networks, Dial Global, Westwood One, Learfield Communications, The Free Beer and Hot Wings Show, etc.

The spacecraft can deliver and receive signals from 50 states of United States, the Caribbean and Mexico and has been designated as the third HD-PRIME satellite. Originally built as a ground spare to the AMC-10 and AMC-11 satellite program, AMC-18 is optimized for digital television distribution from the center of the U.S. orbital arc. The satellite has an expected lifetime of at least 15 years.

== Transponder details ==
C-band payload: 24 × 36 MHz
Amp type	SSPA, 20 watts
Amp Redundancy:	16 for 12
Receiver redundancy:	4 for 2
Coverage:	Canada, United States, Mexico, Caribbean
