= Joe Clayton =

Joseph P. Clayton
- Born: October 11, 1949; Louisville, Kentucky, US
- Died: November 3, 2018 (aged 69)
- Occupation: Businessman
- Known for: CEO of satellite dish provider Dish Network

Joseph P. Clayton (11 October 1949 – 3 November 2018) was the CEO of Dish Network, a Colorado based Direct Broadcast Satellite provider. He both took the role from and was replaced by Charlie Ergen.

== Career ==
From 1992 to 1996, Clayton was executive vice president of marketing and sales in the Americas and Asia at Thomson S.A. (the Consumer Electronics Division at GE). During his tenure as EVP, Clayton was involved in developing and rolling out the consumer equipment for DirecTV.

In 1997, Clayton become the CEO of Frontier Communications (originally Rochester Telephone). He was CEO of Frontier until September 1999, during which time the company acquired GlobalCenter.

Clayton went on to become president of Global Crossing Ltd, the company that acquired Frontier Communications. He was president until November 2001.

From 2001 to 2004, Clayton was the CEO of Sirius XM Holdings, where he launched satellite radio. He then became the president of Sirius until 2008.

In May 2011, Clayton took over the role of CEO of DISH Network from Charlie Ergen. Clayton stepped down from his role in February 2015, and was replaced by Ergen.

Clayton died November 3, 2018, at the age of 69.
