= Galaxy 23 =

Geostationary communications satellite

- Mission type: Communications
- Operator: Intelsat / EchoStar
- COSPAR ID: 2003-034A
- SATCAT no.: 27854
- Mission duration: 12 years (design life)

Spacecraft properties
- Spacecraft: FS-1300
- Manufacturer: Space Systems/Loral

Start of mission
- Launch date: 8 August 2003, 3:31am GMT
- Launch site: Odyssey (Sea Launch)

Orbital parameters
- Longitude: 121° West

Transponders
- Band: 24 C-band x 36 MHz
- Coverage area: North America

Galaxy 23 is the name given to the C-band service of the Galaxy 23/EchoStar IX communications satellite jointly owned by Intelsat and EchoStar located at 121° W longitude (20Years, i=1° (2024)), serving the North American market. It was built by Space Systems/Loral, as part of its FS-1300 line. Galaxy 23 was formerly known as Intelsat Americas 13 or Telstar 13. The "Galaxy 23" portion of the service provides transponders in the C band. The "EchoStar IX" portion broadcasts K_{u} band, and K_{a} band transponders.

While the satellite itself is jointly owned through a partnership between Intelsat and Echostar, the K_{u} band payload is owned and operated by Echostar for international television programming and local television channels. That service is intended for Dish Network customers using a SuperDish system. The C-band payload is owned and operated by Intelsat. The K_{a} band payload is owned and operated by Echostar for as-yet-undisclosed purposes.

Current clients for Galaxy 23/EchoStar 9 include Dish Network, Direct TV, Genesis Networks, and Playboy.
