= AMC-10 =

AMC-10 may refer to:

- AMC-10 (satellite), a communications satellite that belonged to SES Americom
- USS Longspur (AMc-10), the USS Longspur was a coastal minesweeper that belonged to the US Navy
- AMC 10, the American Mathematics Competitions for students in grades 10 and below
