= Echo I =

Echo I or Echo 1 or variant, may refer to:

- Echo I-class submarine of the Soviet Navy
- Echo 1, a 1960 NASA Project Echo passive communications satellite that failed to make it to space
- Echo 1A, a 1960 NASA Project Echo passive communications satellite that was NASA's first comm satellite, thus also referred to as "Echo 1"

== See also ==
- EchoStar I, a 1990s communications satellite
- Echo (disambiguation)
