= Rainbow-1 =

American Commercial Communications satellite

Coordinates: 0°N 61.5°W

Rainbow-1 → EchoStar XII
- Mission type: Communication
- Operator: EchoStar
- COSPAR ID: 2003-033A
- SATCAT no.: 33207
- Mission duration: 15 years (planned); 23 years, 8 days (in progress)

Spacecraft properties
- Bus: A2100AXS
- Manufacturer: Lockheed Martin Commercial Space Systems
- Launch mass: 4,328 kilograms (9,542 lb)
- Dry mass: 2,760 kilograms (6,080 lb)
- Power: watts

Start of mission
- Launch date: July 17, 2003, 23:45 UTC
- Rocket: Atlas V 521 AV-003
- Launch site: Cape Canaveral SLC-41

Orbital parameters
- Reference system: Geocentric
- Regime: Geostationary
- Longitude: 86.4° West
- Inclination: 0 degrees
- Period: 1,437.0 minutes

Transponders
- Band: 36 K_{u} band
- Coverage area: Contiguous United States

Echostar 12 (E*12), also known as Cablevision-1 and Rainbow-1, is a commercial communications satellite in geosynchronous Earth orbit. It was launched on 17 July 2003, as Rainbow-1, on the third flight of the Atlas V rocket from Cape Canaveral, Florida. Its original purpose was to transmit digital television streams for the ill-fated Voom high definition direct broadcast satellite network.

Part of the A2100 series of commercial satellites, Rainbow-1 was constructed by the Lockheed Martin corporation at an approximate cost of $100 million USD, although this amount has not been verified. It is solar powered, has an approximate mass of 2,760 kilograms (6,080 lb) (launch vehicle mass 4,328 kilograms [9,542 lb]), and is capable of transmitting on the C- and K_{u} bands.

EchoStar (Dish Network spin off) now owns the satellite. The satellite was renamed Echostar 12 (or E*12) in March 2006.

EchoStar 12 is still in orbit and located at 61.5 degrees West longitude, over the Earth's equator. It is currently being used for Dish Network HDTV television signals, transmitted using DVB, on the K_{u} band transponders. The satellite has lost some capability due to degradation of its solar power system.
