= Vinaphone =

Vietnamese mobile network operator

VNPT VinaPhone Corporation
- Trade name: VNPT – VinaPhone
- Native name: Tổng Công ty Dịch vụ Viễn thông
- Type: Subsidiary
- Industry: Mobile telecommunications
- Founded: 26 June 1996; 30 years ago
- Headquarters: Hanoi, Vietnam
- Key people: Nguyen Truong Giang
- Products: Mobile networks, Telecom services
- Brands: VinaPhone
- Number of employees: 15000+
- Parent: VNPT
- Website: www.vinaphone.com.vn

VNPT VinaPhone Corporation (Vietnamese: Tổng Công ty Dịch vụ Viễn thông, lit. 'Telecommunications Services Corporation'), also recognized by its brand name VinaPhone (sometimes stylized all lowercase or alternatively Vinaphone), is a major mobile network operator in Vietnam and the core subsidiary of the state-owned Vietnam Posts and Telecommunications Group. Founded 26 June 1996, as a GSM launcher, VinaPhone is the second network (after MobiFone) and currently the second largest provider in Vietnam.

== Partnership ==
on 17 Nov. 2009, VinaPhone had joined Conexus Mobile Alliance In the beginning of September 2014 VinaPhone signed a strategic co-operation agreement with Vodafone.

== Market share and competitors ==
VinaPhone had a market share of 17.49% in 2023. Its main competitors are Viettel with a market share of 57.6%, MobiFone with 22.52%, and Vietnamobile with 1.75%. VinaPhone, along with MobiFone and Viettel, the three large state-owned providers, held a combined market share of almost 98%.

== History ==
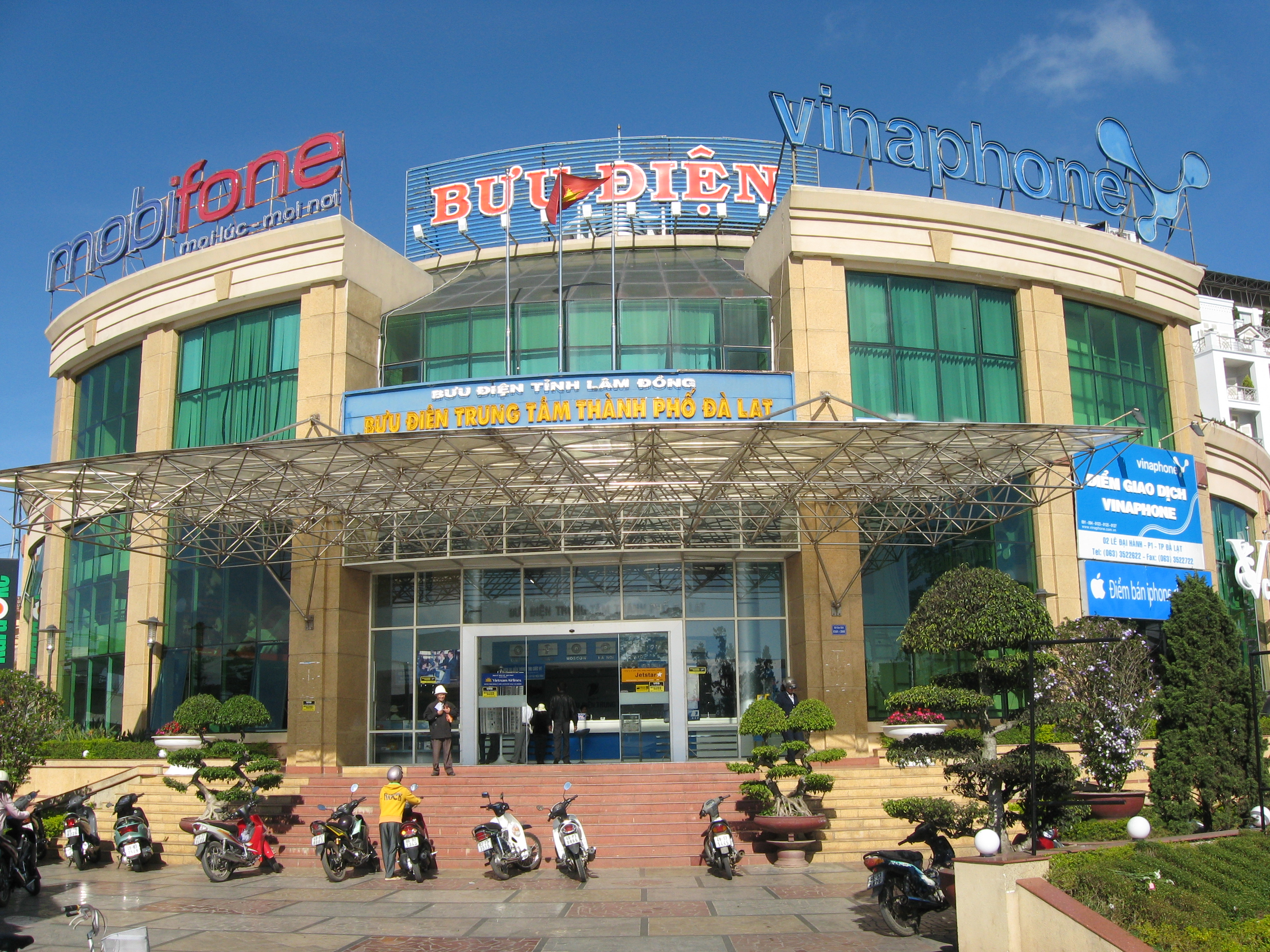
VinaPhone office at DaLat Post office

The VinaPhone network was established in 1996, followed by the formal creation of the Vietnam Telecom Services Company in 1997. During its initial years, the company established three regional telecom service centres to manage its operations. In 2006, following Vietnam's accession to the World Trade Organization, the company rebranded, changing its logo from GPC to the current VinaPhone brand.

The company launched 3G services in 2009, 4G services in 2015, and began trial deployment of 5G services in 2020.

== Popularity ==
VinaPhone is considered Operator of State Servants as most of its subscribers are civil service employees.

== Sponsorship ==
The company has been the official jersey sponsor of the Vietnamese national basketball team.
