= Lockheed Martin A2100 =

Satellite bus

The A2100 is a model of communications satellite spacecraft made by Lockheed Martin Space Systems. It is used as the foundation for telecommunications payloads in geosynchronous orbit, as well as GOES-R weather satellites and GPS Block III satellites. Over 40 satellites use the A2100 bus.

== History ==
The first satellite, AMC-1, was launched September 8, 1996, and has achieved 15-year on-orbit service life. Since 1996 there have been over 45 of the A2100 based satellites launched, with over 400 years of total on-orbit service. Other A2100 spacecraft include JCSAT-13 and VINASAT-2, which were launched May, 2012 on an Ariane 5 rocket, as well as Arabsat-6A and Hellas Sat 4/SaudiGeoSat-1 of Saudi Arabia's Arabsat-6G program.

In 2002, Lockheed Martin Commercial Space Systems was given a Frost and Sullivan Satellite Reliability Award for excellence in the production of flexible and reliable communications satellites used in geosynchronous Earth orbit.

A2100 customers includes communications companies around the world, including Astra, Telesat, SKY Perfect JSAT Group and others.

== Design ==
The Lockheed Martin A2100 geosynchronous spacecraft series is designed for a variety of telecommunications needs including K_{a} band broadband and broadcast services, fixed satellite services in C-band and K_{u} band payload configurations, high-power direct broadcast services using the K_{u} band frequency spectrum, and mobile satellite services using UHF, L-band and S-band payloads.

The A2100 satellite system was developed by the Astro Space team at its East Windsor, New Jersey facility, with team members delivering a flexible common bus with fewer components, lower spacecraft weight, and reduced customer delivery time.

The A2100 is being supplanted by the LM2100, an evolutionary upgrade with several new features. The military version is the LM2100 Combat Bus.

=== Propulsion system ===
The attitude control system includes reaction wheels, with momentum desaturation and main motor maneuver attitude control propulsion provided by small monopropellant hydrazine motors. This hydrazine supply is contained in a central propellant tank of 0.90 m diameter and up to 2.00 m length depending on the customer's requirements. This tank's maximum length was later increased to 2.55 m. The liquid apogee engine uses hydrazine fuel from the central tank along with nitrogen tetroxide oxidizer from two flanking tanks of 0.54 m diameter and up to 1.65 m long. Orbit maintenance is performed by the small hydrazine motors and ion thrusters. The maximum propellant supply (with the largest tanks at 95% fill factor) are 1368 kg of hydrazine fuel and 627 kg of nitrogen tetroxide oxidizer.

According to Moog-ISP, the A2100 platform uses its LEROS bipropellant Liquid Apogee Engine.

== Satellite orders ==
=== A2100A ===
Satellite	Country	Operator	Type	Coverage	Launch date (UTC)	Rocket	Changes	Status
GE-1	United States	SES Americom	Television broadcasting	24 C-band, 24 Ku-band	8 September 1996	Atlas IIA	Known as AMC 1	Active
GE-2	United States	SES Americom	Television broadcasting	24 C-band, 24 Ku-band	30 January 1997	Ariane-44L	Known as AMC 2	Retired
GE-3	United States	SES Americom	Television broadcasting	24 C-band, 24 Ku-band	4 September 1997	Atlas IIAS	Known as Eagle 1	Active
GE-7	United States	SES Americom	Television broadcasting	24 C-band	14 September 2000	Ariane 5G	Known as AMC 7	Retired
GE-8	United States	SES Americom	Television broadcasting	24 C-band	20 December 2000	Ariane 5G	Known as AMC 8 (Aurora 3)	Active
GE-10	United States	SES Americom	Television broadcasting	24 C-band	5 February 2004	Atlas IIAS		Retired
GE-11	United States	SES Americom	Television broadcasting	24 C-band	19 May 2004	Atlas IIAS		Active
GE-18	United States	SES Americom	Television broadcasting	24 C-band	19 May 2004	Ariane 5 ECA		Active
BSAT-3a	Japan	BSAT Corp	Television broadcasting	12 Ku-band	14 August 2007	Ariane 5 ECA		Active
BSAT-3b	Japan	BSAT Corp	Television broadcasting	12 Ku-band	28 October 2010	Ariane 5 ECA		Active
BSAT-3c	Japan	BSAT Corp	Television broadcasting	24 Ku-band	6 August 2011	Ariane 5 ECA		Active
GOES-R	United States	NOAA	Meteorology		19 November 2016	Atlas V 541	Known as GOES 16	Active
GOES-S	United States	NOAA	Meteorology		1 March 2018	Atlas V 541	Known as GOES 17	Active
GOES-T	United States	NOAA	Meteorology		1 March 2022	Atlas V 541	Known as GOES 18	Active
GOES-U	United States	NOAA	Meteorology		25 June 2024	Falcon Heavy	Known as GOES 19	Active
ABS-7	Bermuda	ABS	Television broadcasting	24 Ku-band, 6 Ka-band	4 September 1999	Ariane-42P	Known as ABS 7	Inclined
Nemesis 1	United States	National Reconnaissance Office	SIGINT, COMINT		8 September 2009	Atlas V 401	Known as PAN, PAN360, USA 207	Active
Nemesis 2	United States	National Reconnaissance Office	SIGINT, COMINT		17 September 2014	Atlas V 401	Known as CLIO, USA 257	Active
Telkom 1	Indonesia	Telkom Indonesia	Communications	24 C-band	12 August 1999	Ariane-42P		Retired
Vinasat-1	Vietnam	VNPT	Communications	8 C-band, 12 Ku-band	18 April 2008	Ariane 5 ECA		Active
Vinasat-2	Vietnam	VNPT	Communications	24 Ku-band	15 May 2012	Ariane 5 ECA		Active
Zhongwei 1	China	China Satcom	Communications	18 C-band, 20 Ku-band	30 May 1998	Long March 3B	Known as APStar 9A	Retired

=== A2100AX ===
Satellite	Country	Operator	Type	Coverage	Launch date (UTC)	Rocket	Changes	Status
EchoStar 3	United States	EchoStar	Television broadcasting	32 Ku-band	5 October 1997	Atlas IIAS		Retired
EchoStar 4	United States	EchoStar	Television broadcasting	32 Ku-band	7 May 1998	Proton-K Blok-DM3		Retired
EchoStar 7	United States	EchoStar	Television broadcasting	32 Ku-band	7 May 1998	Atlas IIIB-DEC		Retired
GE 1A	United States	SES Americom	Communications	28 Ku-band	1 October 2000	Proton-K Blok-DM3	Known as NSS 11	Active
GE 4	United States	SES Americom	Television broadcasting & satellite internet	24 C-band, 24 Ku-band	13 November 1999	Ariane-44LP	Known as AMC 4	Active
GE 6	United States	SES Americom	Television broadcasting & satellite internet	24 C-band, 24 Ku-band	21 October 2000	Proton-K Blok-DM3	Known as AMC 6 (Rainbow 2)	Active
LMI 1	Bermuda	ABS	Television broadcasting & satellite internet	28 C-band, 16 Ku-band	26 September 1999	Proton-K Blok-DM3	Known as ABS 6	Active
Nimiq 1	Canada	Telesat	Satellite internet	32 Ku-band	20 May 1999	Proton-K Blok-DM3		Active
Nimiq 2	Canada	Telesat	Satellite internet	32 Ku-band	29 December 2002	Proton-M		Active
N-SAT 110	Japan	SKY Perfect JSAT	Satellite internet	24 Ku-band	6 October 2000	Ariane-42L	Known as Superbird 5	Retired

=== A2100AXS ===
Satellite	Country	Operator	Type	Coverage	Launch date (UTC)	Rocket	Changes	Status
AMC-14	United States	SES Americom	Television broadcasting	32 Ku-band	14 March 2008	Proton-M Phase 1		Active
AMC-15	United States	SES Americom	Television broadcasting	24 Ku-band, 12 Ka-band	14 October 2004	Proton-M Phase 1		Active
AMC-16	United States	SES Americom	Television broadcasting	24 Ku-band, 12 Ka-band	14 October 2004	Proton-M Phase 1		Retired
Astra 1KR	Luxembourg	SES	Television broadcasting	32 Ku-band	20 April 2006	Atlas V 431		Active
Astra 1L	Luxembourg	SES	Television broadcasting	29 Ku-band, 2 Ka-band	4 May 2007	Ariane 5 ECA		Active
EchoStar 10	United States	EchoStar	Television broadcasting	42 Ku-band	15 February 2006	Zenit-3SL		Active
JCSat 9	Japan	SKY Perfect JSAT	Communications	20 C-band, 20 Ku-band, 1 S-band	12 April 2006	Zenit-3SL	Known as JCSat 5A	Active
JCSat 10	Japan	SKY Perfect JSAT	Communications	12 C-band, 30 Ku-band	11 August 2006	Ariane 5 ECA	Known as JCSat 3A	Active
JCSAT-11	Japan	SKY Perfect JSAT	Communications	12 C-band, 30 Ku-band	5 September 2007	Proton-M Phase 1		Launch failure
JCSat 12	Japan	SKY Perfect JSAT	Communications	12 C-band, 30 Ku-band	21 August 2008	Ariane 5 ECA	Known as JCSat RA	Active
JCSat 13	Japan	SKY Perfect JSAT	Communications	44 Ku-band	15 May 2012	Ariane 5 ECA	Known as JCSat 4B	Active
NSS-6	Netherlands	SES	Satellite internet	50 Ku-band	17 December 2002	Ariane 44L		Active
NSS-7	Netherlands	SES	Satellite internet	36 C-band, 36 Ku-band	16 April 2002	Ariane 44L		Retired
Rainbow-1	United States	EchoStar	Television broadcasting	36 Ku-band	17 July 2003	Atlas V 521	Known as EchoStar 12	Retired
Sirius 4 (Astra 4A)	Sweden	SES Sirius	Communications	52 Ku-band, 2 Ka-band	17 November 2007	Proton-M Phase 1		Active
Garuda 1	Indonesia	Asoa Cellular Satellite	Mobile communications	88 L-band	12 February 2000	Proton-K Blok-DM3		Active

=== A2100M (Military) ===
Satellite	Country	Operator	Type	Coverage	Launch date (UTC)	Rocket	Changes	Status
AEHF 1	United States	Air Force Space Command	Military communications		14 August 2010	Atlas V 531	Known as USA 214	Active
AEHF 2	United States	Air Force Space Command	Military communications		4 May 2012	Atlas V 531	Known as USA 235	Active
AEHF 3	United States	Air Force Space Command	Military communications		18 September 2013	Atlas V 531	Known as USA 246	Active
AEHF 4	United States	Air Force Space Command	Military communications		17 October 2018	Atlas V 551	Known as USA 288	Active
AEHF 5	United States	Air Force Space Command	Military communications		8 August 2019	Atlas V 551	Known as USA 292	Active
AEHF 6	United States	Air Force Space Command	Military communications		26 March 2020	Atlas V 551	Known as USA 298	Active
MUOS 1	United States	United States Navy	Military communications		24 February 2012	Atlas V 551		Active
MUOS 2	United States	United States Navy	Military communications		19 July 2013	Atlas V 551		Active
MUOS 3	United States	United States Navy	Military communications		21 January 2015	Atlas V 551		Active
MUOS 4	United States	United States Navy	Military communications		2 September 2015	Atlas V 551		Active
MUOS 5	United States	United States Navy	Military communications		24 June 2016	Atlas V 551		Active
GPS-III 01	United States	Air Force Space Command	Navigation		23 December 2016	Falcon 9	Known as Navstar 77, USA 289, Vespucci	Active
GPS-III 02	United States	Air Force Space Command	Navigation		22 August 2019	Delta IV M+ (4,2)	Known as Navstar 78, USA 293, Magellan	Active
GPS-III 03	United States	Air Force Space Command	Navigation		30 June 2020	Falcon 9	Known as Navstar 79, USA 304, Columbus	Active
GPS-III 04	United States	Air Force Space Command	Navigation		5 November 2020	Falcon 9	Known as Navstar 80, USA 309, Sacagawea	Active
GPS-III 05	United States	Air Force Space Command	Navigation		17 June 2021	Falcon 9	Known as Navstar 81, USA 320, Neil Armstrong	Active
GPS-III 06	United States	Air Force Space Command	Navigation		18 January 2023	Falcon 9	Known as Navstar 82, USA 343, Amelia Earhart	Active
GPS-III 07	United States	Air Force Space Command	Navigation		17 December 2024	Falcon 9	Known as Navstar 83, USA 440, Sally Ride	Active
GPS-III 08	United States	Air Force Space Command	Navigation		30 May 2025	Falcon 9	Known as Navstar 84, USA 522, Katherine Johnson	Active
GPS-III 09	United States	Air Force Space Command	Navigation		28 January 2026	Falcon 9	Known as Navstar 85, USA 574, Ellison Onizuka	Active
GPS-III 10	United States	Air Force Space Command	Navigation		Q4 2026	Vulcan Centaur 2S		Awaiting launch
SBIRS GEO 1	United States	Air Force Space Command	Early warning	2 SBIRS sensors	7 May 2011	Atlas V 401	Known as USA 230	Active
SBIRS GEO 2	United States	Air Force Space Command	Early warning	2 SBIRS sensors	19 March 2013	Atlas V 401	Known as USA 241	Active
SBIRS GEO 3	United States	Air Force Space Command	Early warning	2 SBIRS sensors	21 January 2017	Atlas V 401	Known as USA 273	Active
SBIRS GEO 4	United States	Air Force Space Command	Early warning	2 SBIRS sensors	20 January 2018	Atlas V 411	Known as USA 282	Active
GPS-IIIF 1	United States	Air Force Space Command	Navigation		Q2 2027	Vulcan Centaur		In production
GPS-IIIF 2	United States	Air Force Space Command	Navigation		Q2 2027	Vulcan Centaur		In production

=== LM2100 (Modernized) ===
Satellite	Country	Operator	Type	Coverage	Launch date (UTC)	Rocket	Changes	Status
Arabsat-6A	Saudi Arabia	Arabsat	Communications		11 April 2019	Falcon Heavy		Active
SaudiGeoSat-1/HellasSat-4	Saudi Arabia, Greece	Arabsat, Hellas Sat	Communications	Ku-band, Ka-band	5 February 2019	Ariane 5 ECA		Active
JCSAT-17	Japan	SKY Perfect JSAT	Mobile communications	S-band	18 February 2020	Ariane 5 ECA		Active
GeoXO 1	United States	NOAA	Meteorology		2030+			Planned
GeoXO 2	United States	NOAA	Meteorology		2030+			Planned
GeoXO 3	United States	NOAA	Meteorology		2030+			Planned

=== LM2100M (Modernized Military) ===
Satellite	Country	Operator	Type	Coverage	Launch date (UTC)	Rocket	Changes	Status
SBIRS GEO 5	United States	Air Force Space Command	Early warning	2 SBIRS sensors	18 May 2021	Atlas V 421	Known as USA 315	Operational
SBIRS GEO 6	United States	Air Force Space Command	Early warning	2 SBIRS sensors	4 August 2022	Atlas V 421		Operational
NG-OPIR-GEO 1	United States	Air Force Space Command	Early warning	2 NG-OPIR sensors	May 2026	Vulcan Centaur		Available for launch
NG-OPIR-GEO 2	United States	Air Force Space Command	Early warning	2 NG-OPIR sensors	2027	Vulcan Centaur		In production
NG-OPIR-GEO 3	United States	Air Force Space Command	Early warning	2 NG-OPIR sensors	2028			In production
GPS-IIIF 3	United States	Air Force Space Command	Navigation		2028	Vulcan Centaur		In production
GPS-IIIF 4	United States	Air Force Space Command	Navigation		2028			In production
GPS-IIIF 5-12	United States	Air Force Space Command	Navigation		2029-3031			Ordered

== Cancelled orders ==
Satellite	Country	Operator	Type	Coverage
GE-9	United States	SES Americom	Television broadcasting	24 C-band
Jabiru 1	Australia	NewSat Corporation	Communications	50 Ka-band, 18 Ku-band, 1 S-band
Rainbow KA-1	United States	Cablevision	Television broadcasting	Ka-band
Rainbow KA-2	United States	Cablevision	Television broadcasting	Ka-band
Rainbow KA-3	United States	Cablevision	Television broadcasting	Ka-band
Rainbow KA-4	United States	Cablevision	Television broadcasting	Ka-band
Rainbow KA-5	United States	Cablevision	Television broadcasting	Ka-band
Agrani 1	India	Agrani	Mobile communications	
Garuda 2	Indonesia	Asia Cellular Satellite	Mobile communications	88 L-band
Astrolink 1	United States	Astrolink	Mobile communications	Ka-band
Astrolink 2	United States	Astrolink	Mobile communications	Ka-band
Astrolink 3	United States	Astrolink	Mobile communications	Ka-band
Astrolink 4	United States	Astrolink	Mobile communications	Ka-band
SBIRS GEO 7	United States	Air Force Space Command	Early warning	2 SBIRS sensors
SBIRS GEO 8	United States	Air Force Space Command	Early warning	2 SBIRS sensors
