= Vinasat-2 =

Vietnamese satellite

VINASAT-2
- A rendering of VINASAT-2
- Mission type: Communications
- Operator: VNPT
- COSPAR ID: 2012-023B
- SATCAT no.: 38332
- Mission duration: 15 years

Spacecraft properties
- Bus: A2100A
- Manufacturer: Lockheed Martin
- Launch mass: 2,969 kilograms (6,546 lb)

Start of mission
- Launch date: 15 May 2012, 22:13 UTC
- Rocket: Ariane 5ECA VA206
- Launch site: Kourou ELA-3
- Contractor: Arianespace

Orbital parameters
- Reference system: Geocentric
- Regime: Geostationary
- Longitude: 132° east
- Perigee altitude: 35,782 kilometres (22,234 mi)
- Apogee altitude: 35,801 kilometres (22,246 mi)
- Inclination: 0.00 degrees
- Period: 23.93 hours
- Epoch: 27 October 2013, 18:17:43 UTC

Vinasat-2 (stylized all uppercase) is the second Vietnamese satellite to be placed in orbit. It was launched at 22:13 UTC on May 15, 2012 (5:13 am on May 16 in the Vietnam time zone) at the European Spaceport in Kourou in French Guiana in South America and entered orbit 35 minutes later. VINASAT is the national satellite program of Vietnam. The project aims to bring independence in satellite communications for Vietnam, besides other benefits such as enhancing national security, opening new economic opportunities, etc.

The satellite infrastructure is designed to support Vietnam's economic and public safety sectors by providing telecommunications links. It will provide communication for fishermen at sea, deliver weather forecasts and ensure defence security. The satellite cost about US$280 million, weighed 3,000 kilograms (6,600 lb), and was constructed by US-based Lockheed Martin. It will be able to provide capacity equal to 13,000 channels of telephone/internet/data communications or 150 television channels; greater number of sensor responses; and higher bandwidth capacity.

The Lockheed Martin A2100 satellite has 12 Ku band transponders and 8 C band transponders.

== See also ==
- Vinasat-1
