= Geostationary Extended Observations =

Planned weather satellite system

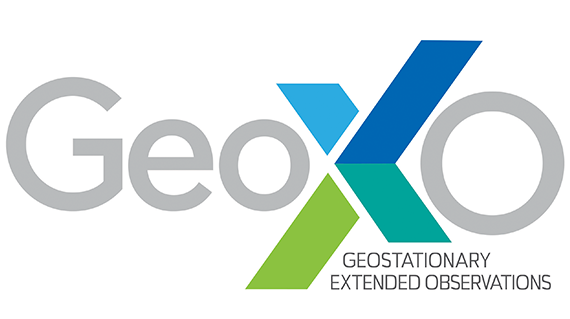
- Wordmark of the GeoXO system
- Manufacturer: Lockheed Martin; Maxar; L3Harris; BAE Systems Inc.
- Country of origin: United States
- Operator: NOAA; NASA

Specifications
- Bus: LM-2100; LS-1300
- Regime: Geostationary
- Design life: 20 years (planned)

Production
- Status: Planned
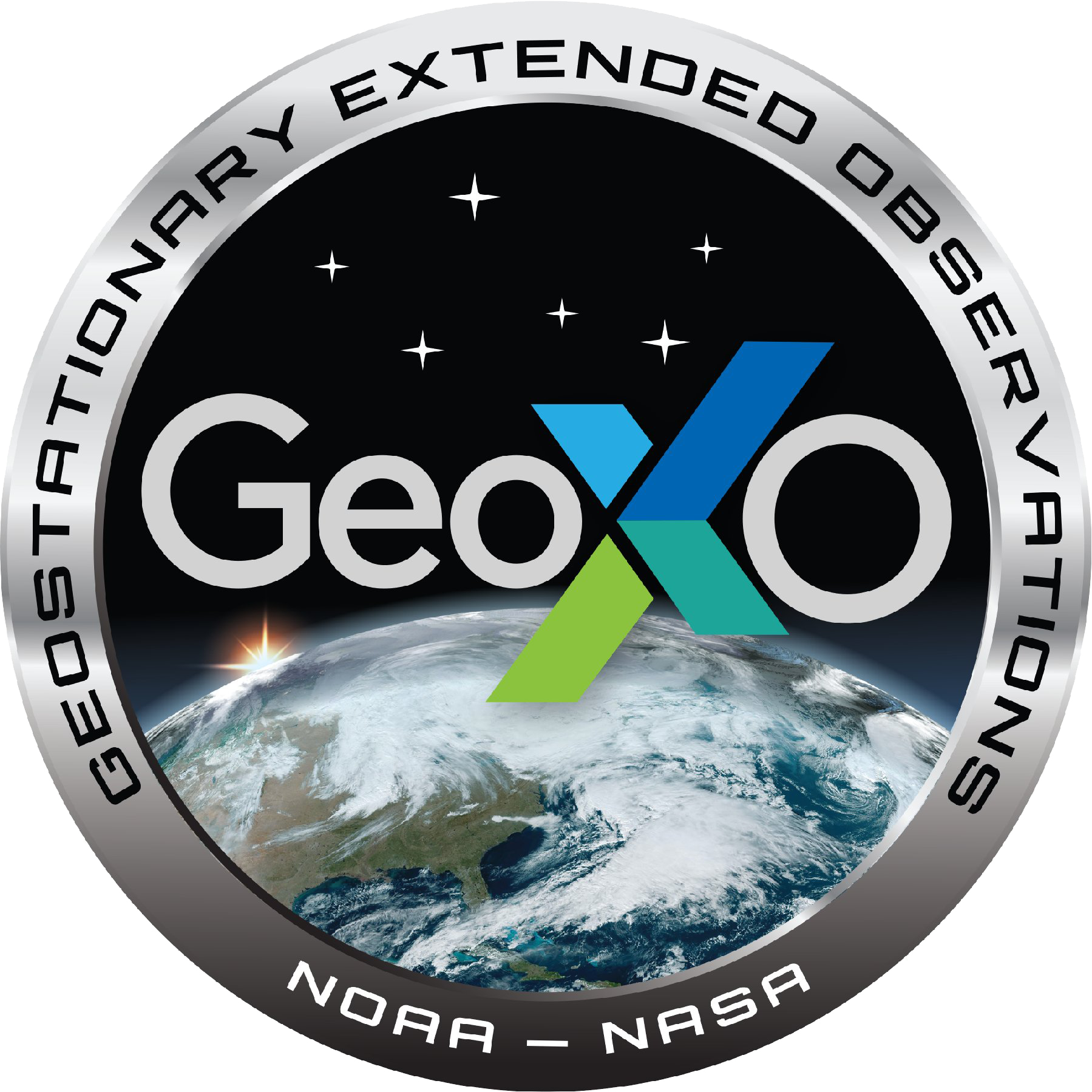
- GeoXO mission insignia

The Geostationary Extended Observations (GeoXO) satellite system is the National Oceanic and Atmospheric Administration (NOAA)'s planned replacement for the existing Geostationary Operational Environmental Satellite (GOES) satellites. These new geostationary satellites will make weather, ocean, and climate observations. The project aims to begin observations in the early 2030s as the GOES-R satellites reach their operational lifetime. The first GeoXO satellite is currently scheduled to be launched in 2032, with another following in 2034, and the mission will extend NOAA’s geostationary observations into the 2050s.

== Program history ==
=== Contract history ===
NASA is developing the satellites and awarded multiple "Phase A" contracts in 2021 and 2022, including ones with Lockheed Martin and Maxar to study using their LM-2100 and 1300-class satellite busses, respectively. The program was officially approved by the United States Department of Commerce in December 2022, moving the program from the study phase to the development phase, and in March 2023 NASA and NOAA awarded L3Harris a $765.5 million contract to develop the first two GeoXO Imager (GXI) instruments. On September 11, 2023, NASA and NOAA awarded Ball Aerospace (later sold to BAE Systems Inc.) a $486.9 million contract to develop the GeoXO Sounder (GXS) instrument.

Unlike the payloads carried on GOES-12 through GOES-19, GeoXO satellites will not carry any instruments for observing space weather. Continuity of space weather and environment observations after the retirement of the GOES system is to be provided through the Space Weather Follow On-Lagrange 1 (SWFO-L1) mission and the Space Weather Next program.

=== Initial designs ===
During the earlier stages of GeoXO before the beginning of the second Trump administration, six satellites were planned at an estimated cost of $19.6 billion, of which three satellites would operate concurrently at a time. The western and easternmost of these satellites, positioned at 137°W and 75°W respectively above the equator, would occupy the GEO-West and GEO-East positions (comparable to the preceding GOES constellation's GOES-West and GOES-East). Both of these satellites were planned to carry a new imager (GXI) which would replace the GOES-R series' Advanced Baseline Imager. GXI would offer new bands and increased resolution over ABI and was also initially planned to include a true green band absent on ABI which would allow for true color imagery, although this was later removed. The two satellites would carry a lightning mapper (LMX) which would double both the spatial and temporal resolution of lightning detection, as well as shift the northward extent of lightning detection northward compared to the GOES-R series of satellites, allowing for full coverage of Alaska. They would also carry an ocean color instrument (OCX) which would allow for monitoring of marine health. A third satellite, GEO-Central, would be positioned at 105°W longitude and would carry a hyperspectral infrared sounder (GXI). GXI would provide detailed atmospheric information about wind, temperature, and moisture in real time, and it would aid numerical weather prediction. GEO-Central would also carry an atmospheric composition instrument (ACX) would support monitoring of air pollutants and smoke, which would aid in tracking of air quality and allow for earlier detection of wildfire starts.

=== Program changes by the second Trump administration ===
In 2025, under the leadership of the second Trump administration, many program changes were made to GeoXO after the administration's FY2026 Presidential Budget Request (PBR) was proposed. Under direction from the White House, administration officials at NOAA moved to reduce the overall program cost to under $12 billion and move to a fixed annual contract of no more than $500 million per year. To achieve these ends, the overall number of satellites was cut to only 4 from the initially proposed 6, and contracts worth $852 million for the ocean color and atmospheric composition instruments were canceled. The contract for the GeoXO Lightning Mapper (LMX) was also canceled. The contract for the hyperspectral infrasounder was also at one point considered for cancelation. NOAA moved to have the first GeoXO satellite to launch in 2032, GEO-1 (which would replace GOES-18 as the first GEO-West satellite), use a spare Advanced Baseline Imager from the GOES-R series, while also proposing assembling a Geostationary Lightning Mapper (also used on the GOES-R series) from parts for it to carry rather than acquiring a new instrument. GEO-2, to replace GOES-19 in 2034 as GEO-East, would carry the new imager but would lack the lightning mapper, carrying the infrasounder planned for GEO-Central instead. Current and former NOAA officials criticized this imbalance between GEO-West and GEO-East for its reduction of redundancy in case of failures.

==== Congressional response ====
In March 2026, the U.S. Senate Committee on Commerce, Science, and Transportation unanimously passed the Weather Research and Forecast Innovation Reauthorization Act of 2026. This act would commit NOAA to modernizing weather-monitoring capabilities and ensure that sounding and imaging capabilities would continue to be present on all GeoXO satellites.

The following April, a Democratic Party minority staff report from the U.S. House Committee on Science, Space, and Technology criticized the administration for dismantling the Joint Agency Satellite Division. JASD was a division within NASA created in 2010 to support other federal agencies including NOAA with their earth observations systems, and had overseen the acquisition, development, and launch of several NOAA satellites, including those in the GOES-R and JPSS programs. It had also been providing similar oversight for the GeoXO and in doing so was responsible for administering substantial NOAA funds for the program. The committee report criticized NASA for unilaterally implementing the 2026 PBR as law at the direction of the Office of Management and Budget without any corresponding legislation ever being enacted by Congress, and said that irreversible policy changes were enacted by the administration before Congress knew what was happening. In a leaked document, OMB officials had previously criticized NASA's role as NOAA's acquisitions agent, in part because of its unwillingness to negotiate fixed-price contracts. JASD was dissolved in the following months, with NOAA later moving GeoXO to a fixed $500 million per year contract at OMB's direction.

The U.S. House Committee on Appropriations, in its 'Commerce, Justice, Science, and Related Agencies Appropriations Bill' for FY2027 in May 2026, "remind[ed] NOAA" of the Joint Explanatory Statement for the budget bill enacted in January 2026, which rejected significant cuts proposed by the FY2026 PBR. The referenced Joint Explanatory Statement endorsed a GeoXO architecture wherein both the east and west satellites would incorporate advanced imaging and atmospheric sounding capabilities. The FY2027 appropriations bill recommended $677 million for GeoXO, well over the $500 million proposed annual limit while reaffirming support for both satellites carrying the advanced GeoXO imager and sounder while meeting the target deadline of 2032. It also directed NOAA to provide an updated report on the GeoXO program, including revised mission architecture, how it would use FY2027 funds, and detail funding and any contingencies needed to ensure it could achieve "advanced imaging and sounding on first launch" without further delay.
