= Astrolink =

Communications satellite system joint venture

Astrolink was a joint venture for a communications satellite system consisting of four satellites for providing worldwide internet access via satellite. The joint venture was formed in September 1999. It would have been the first system for satellite internet access. Three American companies and one Italian company were in the $1.3 billion joint venture, which included:

1. Liberty Media, with a 31.6% share (joined December 1999)
2. Lockheed Martin, with a 31.2% share (original investor)
3. TRW Inc., with an 18.6% share (original investor)
4. Telespazio, with an 18.6% share (original investor)

The original plan was to have launched the first satellite in 2002 with the three subsequent satellites launched at six months intervals. The first two satellites would have covered North and South America, with the latter two satellites providing coverage for the rest of the world.

Customers for the system were envisioned to be “multinational corporations and government, and small to medium enterprises”. The program was intended to work together with Motorola in order to create ground-based infrastructure for the satellite communications network in order to provide full ground and satellite services to customers.

Work on the satellite was suspended in October 2001, and in January 2003 there was an attempt to restructure the venture with Liberty media buying out Lockheed Martin's and TRW's shares in the venture. But by October 2003 the venture was altogether scrapped. According to a report by the aviation magazine FlightGlobal, Astrolink likely failed due to a downturn in the communications satellite market that made the plan nonviable.

== Technology ==
The system planned to use four satellites based on the Lockheed Martin A2100 satellite bus, with a maximum of nine satellites depending on the success of the project. According to the Lockheed Martin Space Systems president Pete Kujawski, Astrolink would have allowed customers to purchase only throughput they needed rather than a much wider throughput, allowing clients to transmit data more affordably. Additionally, it used the K_{a} band which enables very high bandwidth.
