= EchoStar VII =

Communications satellite

- Mission type: Communication
- Operator: EchoStar
- COSPAR ID: 2002-006A
- SATCAT no.: 27378
- Mission duration: 12 years planned, 20 years actual

Spacecraft properties
- Bus: A2100AX
- Manufacturer: Lockheed Martin Space Systems
- Launch mass: 4,172 kg (9,198 lb)
- Dry mass: 1,943 kg (4,284 lb)

Start of mission
- Launch date: February 21, 2002, 05:21 UTC
- Rocket: Atlas IIIB-DEC
- Launch site: Cape Canaveral LC-36B
- Entered service: 2002

End of mission
- Disposal: parking orbit, 122 km above geosynchronous (see End-of-life problems)
- Deactivated: May 2022

Orbital parameters
- Reference system: Geocentric
- Regime: Geostationary
- Longitude: 119° West

Transponders
- Band: 32 K_{u} band
- Coverage area: United States and Puerto Rico

EchoStar VII was an American geostationary communications satellite which was operated by DISH Network, originally EchoStar. It was positioned in geostationary orbit at a longitude of 119° West, from where it was used to provide high-definition television direct broadcasting services to the United States.

EchoStar VII was built by Lockheed Martin Space Systems, and was based on the A2100 satellite bus. It was equipped with 32 Ku band transponders, and at launch it had a mass of 4,026 kilograms (8,876 lb), with an expected operational lifespan of around 12 years. The launch occurred from Launch Complex 36 at the Cape Canaveral Air Force Station in Florida, on 21 February 2002. It was issued a $150,000 fine in October 2023, making it the first satellite to be fined under the FCC's anti-space debris rule.

== End-of-life problems ==
In accordance with normal end-of-life planning for a geosynchronous satellite, the satellite was to be boosted to a disposal orbit at least 300 km above the operational orbit. (Note: This is not a 'deorbit' in the strict sense, as the satellite would remain in a parking orbit. However the term is used loosely to refer to satellite end-of-life operations.) Such a plan had been part of pre-launch planning, and was further modified in 2010. In 2012, a license extension was granted to May 2022, permitting a further 10 years of operational life. This incorporated a disposal plan based on a similar boosting, in the knowledge that the full lifetime available would be limited by the fuel available, and in having an adequate reserve available through the satellite's remaining working life.

In February 2022, a technical problem was discovered in that a scheduled thruster operation had not produced the expected change in orbit. (Note: Such maneuvers are a regular part of operating a geostationary satellite, to stop its orbit degenerating to a merely geosynchronous orbit with an analemma 'wobble'. For reception by fixed dish receivers such as domestic satellite TV, this wobble must be kept within tight limits.) This revealed that the satellite was unexpectedly low on propellant; not only might its life be curtailed, but there was already the possibility that there was no longer sufficient propellant for the planned disposal boost. Deorbit might thus be brought forward ahead of the planned end of license, but the license was already within its last few months. There was a further meeting between DISH and FCC in April 2022. On 6 May 2022, DISH notified the FCC that EchoStar-7 satellite had completed its end-of-life deorbit maneuvers and they surrendered its license. This notice showed that the satellite had been placed in a disposal orbit approximately 122 km above the operational orbit, but short of the planned disposal orbit of 300 km.

=== Penalties ===
In October 2023 its operator, DISH, was fined $150,000 by the US Federal Communications Commission (FCC) for failing to de-orbit the satellite according to the terms of its license. The fine was described as "modest", but was followed by 4% drop in share price, or loss of around $100 million.

DISH were further required to implement a compliance program and to 'Develop and Improve Upon Propellant Tracking', both by direct measurement of propellant quantities remaining, or by improved accounting for its consumption during operations. This would be applied across the whole DISH fleet. DISH would also review the 'End-of-Mission Disposal Plan' for each satellite annually, checking that the planned disposal would still be possible with the resources and vehicle condition remaining, the intention being to give greater warning of any shortfalls and so avoid the orbit becoming unreachable, as had happened with EchoStar-7.

The precedent of this penalty was seen as positive for orbital debris removal companies such as Japan's Astroscale and Switzerland's ClearSpace.

== See also ==
- 2002 in spaceflight
