= Charlie Ergen =

American businessman (born 1953)

- Born: Charles William Ergen; March 1, 1953 (age 73); Oak Ridge, Tennessee, US
- Education: University of Tennessee (BA); Wake Forest University (MBA)
- Occupation: Businessman
- Known for: Co-founder, Dish Network
- Title: Chairman of Dish Network and EchoStar Corporation
- Term: 1998-
- Spouse: Candy Ergen
- Children: 5

Charles William Ergen (born March 1, 1953) is an American billionaire businessman, and the co-founder and chairman of Dish Network and EchoStar. He was CEO of Dish Network until May 2011, when he was succeeded by Joseph Clayton. Ergen resumed the role in March 2015 after Clayton's retirement, until December 2017, when Erik Carlson, then president and COO, was promoted to CEO. Ergen remains chairman of the company. Ergen owns 48 percent of Dish and 46 percent of EchoStar shares, which gives him 78 percentage of Dish's and 72 percent of EchoStar's total voting power.

== Early career ==
After graduating with an M.B.A. from Wake Forest in 1976, Ergen worked as a financial analyst for Frito-Lay. He "retired" in 1978 in hopes of working for himself. Afterward, he was a professional gambler, playing poker and blackjack.

== EchoStar ==
In 1980, Ergen, his future wife Candy, and Jim DeFranco started a new business called EchoSphere Corporation, investing $60,000 to purchase two C-Band antennas, targeting rural Colorado. They drove around the Denver metro area on a small budget, selling satellite dishes from the back of their truck.

In 1990, Ergen elevated EchoStar's profile by raising $335 million in junk bonds and purchasing orbital slots for satellites. Two years later, EchoStar got a DBS license from the Federal Communications Commission, giving the company its own geostationary orbital slot. In 1993, EchoStar Communications was incorporated. Under Ergen, EchoStar's net income doubled to $20.4 million, in 1993.

== Dish ==
Under Ergen, Dish was the first satellite television provider to offer two-way high-speed internet access as an investor in and dealer for StarBand Communications' geostationary Ku-band satellite internet access service in the United States and the first to introduce a Digital video recorder in a set-top box. He was also instrumental in making satellite receivers available for under $200. In 2012, the Big Four Broadcasters, NBC, CBS, ABC and Fox filed a suit against Dish after it launched AutoHop, a technology that records broadcasting programming and plays it back without commercials. Dish filed a suit seeking a declaratory judgment asserting the legality of the judgment. Preliminary injunction by Fox to block the service was denied. Ergen has stated that Dish's present focus is on acquiring a significant share of the spectrum for cellular wireless services. Dish is also looking for a partner to build a Wireless network, with Google and AT&T speculated to be potential partners.

Under Ergen, EchoStar and Dish Network acquired multiple companies, after an $8 million deal for 22 channel assignments of DBSC.

== Litigation ==
Various lawsuits in which Ergen has been involved include:

- In 2013 and 2014, Harbinger Capital Partners, a hedge fund managed by Philip Falcone, sued Dish Network and Charles Ergen personally in federal court in New York City, alleging racketeering and claiming that Dish Network had illegally tried to take away the hedge fund's control over LightSquared Inc. during its bankruptcy. In 2015, the federal court dismissed the suit.
- The Iron Workers Mid-South Pension Fund filed suit against Ergen in federal court in Colorado in September 2013. Ergen bought large amounts of LightSquared's debt at deep discounts while it was in bankruptcy. Ergen then made a personal bid of $2 billion to acquire LightSquared's assets. This increased the price that Dish had to bid in order to acquire LightSquared's rights to wireless spectrum. Indeed, Ergen ordered Dish to bid $2.2 billion on these assets. The suit claims this was a breach of Ergen's fiduciary duties to Dish shareholders. Dish and Ergen prevailed in the litigation.
- In 2005, a discrimination lawsuit was filed against EchoStar in federal court in Denver by an employee who said that EchoStar had engaged in "hostile conduct" against her after she had a baby in 2001. The lawsuit was settled for an undisclosed amount in August 2005.

== Personal life ==
Ergen was born into an Episcopalian family in Oak Ridge, Tennessee, on March 1, 1953, the fourth of five children born to Viola (née Siebenthal) and William Krasny Ergen. His mother was one of the first female accountants in the state of Minnesota. His father was an Austrian immigrant who was working in Sweden as a nuclear physicist, and left Europe prior to World War II. His father coined the phrase "China syndrome". His parents married in Minnesota in 1944 and then moved to Camden, New Jersey, before settling in Oak Ridge where his father accepted a position at the Oak Ridge National Laboratory. Ergen graduated from Oak Ridge High School. He then received a Bachelor of Arts from the University of Tennessee at Knoxville, where he was a member of Phi Gamma Delta fraternity, and an M.B.A. from Wake Forest University. He was a professional blackjack and poker player.

Ergen is well known for his frugality. His office is furnished with second-hand couches and he does not fly first class. Ergen used to sign all the checks his company issued but currently signs only checks for $100,000 or more. Ergen's supporters call his negotiating style "patient and prudent."

He is married to Cantey ("Candy") McAdam. They have five children, including entrepreneur Chase Ergen. They live in The Village at Castle Pines, Colorado.

== Wealth ==
Ergen first appeared in the Forbes 400 list in 1999 at the age of 46, with a net worth of US$4.8 billion and was ranked 36th in the list, as Dish share price rose more than 702.1% from 1 January 1999 to 31 December 1999. He was also the third richest person in Colorado at that time. In 2000, Ergen first appeared in The World's Billionaires by Forbes and having a net worth of $11.2 billion, making him the 21st richest person in the world.

Net worth and ranking of Charles Ergen from 2000 to 2023 according to The World's Billionaires.
Year	Net Worth	Rank
2000	$11.2 billion	#21
2001	▼$8.8 billion	▼ #35
2002	▼$6.2 billion	▼ #42
2003	▼$5.9 billion	▼ #45
2004	▲$9.1 billion	▲ #34
2005	▼$7.2 billion	▼ #55
2006	▼$6.7 billion	▼ #80
2007	▲$10 billion	▲ #62
2008	▼$9.5 billion	▼ #87
2009	▼$3.9 billion	▼ #146
2010	▲$5.2 billion	▼ #148
2011	▲$7 billion	▲ #136
2012	▲$8.3 billion	▲ #106
2013	▲$10.6 billion	▲ #100
2014	▲$15 billion	▲ #65
2015	▲$20.1 billion	▲ #43
2016	▼$12.2 billion	▼ #77
2017	▲$18.3 billion	▲ #47
2018	▼$13.4 billion	▼ #106
2019	▼$9.6 billion	▼ #143
2020	▼$5.4 billion	▼ #304
2021	▲$9.6 billion	▲ #241
2022	▼$8.7 billion	#241
2023	▼$3.2 billion	▼ #905

Ergen appeared on the Forbes 400 list every year from 1999 until 2022, but he was dropped in 2023. On November 6, 2023, Dish Network's and EchoStar share price plunged 37.43% and 31.28% respectively after both companies reported earnings below analysts' expectations and a decline in subscriber numbers. As a result, Ergen lost $786 million in a day, causing his net worth to drop from $1.6 billion to $857.6 million, marking the first time in nearly 25 years that he lost his billionaire status. However, with series of corporate restructure of EchoStar in 2024, Ergen regained his billionaire status. As of September 2025, Forbes estimates his net worth at $11 billion.

== Recognition ==
Ergen was recognized with a Rocky Mountain News' Business Person of the Year Award in 1996, and honored a second time in 2001.

Ergen co-founded the Satellite Broadcasting and Communications Association. In 2012, Ergen was inducted into the Consumer Electronics Hall of Fame.
