= Vinasat-1 =

Vietnamese satellite

VINASAT-1
- A rendering of VINASAT-1
- Mission type: Communications
- Operator: VNPT
- COSPAR ID: 2008-018A
- SATCAT no.: 32767
- Mission duration: 15 years

Spacecraft properties
- Bus: A2100A
- Manufacturer: Lockheed Martin
- Launch mass: 2,637 kilograms (5,814 lb)

Start of mission
- Launch date: 18 April 2008, 22:17 UTC
- Rocket: Ariane 5ECA V182
- Launch site: Kourou ELA-3
- Contractor: Arianespace
- Entered service: 1 June 2008

Orbital parameters
- Reference system: Geocentric
- Regime: Geostationary
- Longitude: 132° east
- Perigee altitude: 35,782 kilometres (22,234 mi)
- Apogee altitude: 35,803 kilometres (22,247 mi)
- Inclination: 0.02 degrees
- Period: 23.93 hours
- Epoch: 29 October 2013, 15:56:24 UTC

Vinasat-1 (stylized all uppercase) is a satellite launched by Vietnam, marking a significant achievement for the nation. The launch took place on April 18, 2008, at 22:17 GMT, using an Ariane 5 ECA rocket from the Guiana Space Centre in Kourou, French Guiana, facilitated by Arianespace. Vinasat is the national satellite program of Vietnam, aimed to facilitate telecommunications links in the country.

Vietnam hopes to achieve various economic benefits due to the improved telecommunications links that the satellite will provide. Vietnam also hopes to provide radio, television, and telephone access throughout the country via the satellite.

Vinasat-1’s launch was postponed from its original plan in 2005. This was due to its frequency coordination procedures' complexity, which required adherence to the Radio Regulations of the International Telecommunication Union (ITU).

Satellite operations for Vinasat-1 were under the management of Lockheed Martin Commercial Space Systems (LMCSS), as per the delivery-in-orbit contract signed in Hanoi on May 12, 2006. The satellite utilizes the Lockheed Martin A2100's advanced features, which include 12 Ku band transponders and 8 C band transponders.

On 22 April 2024, the Ministry of Information and Communication directed the Radio Frequency Department and VNPT for submission of a plan to launch a new satellite to replace the expired VINASAT-1 satellite.

== See also ==
- Vinasat-2
