= EchoStar III =

Communications satellite

- Mission type: Communications
- Operator: EchoStar
- COSPAR ID: 1997-059A
- SATCAT no.: 25004
- Mission duration: 12 years

Spacecraft properties
- Bus: A2100AX
- Manufacturer: Lockheed Martin
- Launch mass: 3,674 kilograms (8,100 lb)
- Dry mass: 1,700 kilograms (3,700 lb)

Start of mission
- Launch date: October 5, 1997, 21:01 UTC
- Rocket: Atlas IIAS
- Launch site: Cape Canaveral LC-36B
- Contractor: NASA

Orbital parameters
- Reference system: Geocentric
- Regime: Geostationary
- Longitude: 61.5° west
- Semi-major axis: 42,164.0 kilometers (26,199.5 mi)
- Perigee altitude: 35,787.6 kilometers (22,237.4 mi)
- Apogee altitude: 35,798.8 kilometers (22,244.3 mi)
- Inclination: 2.1 degrees
- Period: 1,436.1 minutes
- Epoch: May 14, 2017

Transponders
- Band: 32 K_{u} band
- Coverage area: Contiguous United States

EchoStar III is a communications satellite operated by EchoStar. Launched in 1997 it was operated in geostationary orbit at a longitude of 61.5 degrees west for 12 years.

== Current status ==
EchoStar announced August 2, 2017, EchoStar III "experienced an anomaly of unknown origin" during a relocation maneuver in the previous week "that has caused communications with the satellite to be interrupted and intermittent." EchoStar III is now drifting westward at about 0.1 degrees per day, encountering other geostationary satellites. Echostar also said the satellite "is [now] a fully depreciated, non-revenue generating asset."

EchoStar III was finally placed in a graveyard orbit on September 6, 2017.

== Satellite ==
The launch of EchoStar I made use of an Atlas-II AS rocket flying from Launch Complex 36 at the Cape Canaveral Air Force Station, Florida. The launch took place at 21:01 UTC on October 5, 1997, with the spacecraft entering a geosynchronous transfer orbit. EchoStar III carried 16 (or more) Ku band transponders to provide direct voice and video communications to small dishes in North America after parking over 79 W or 135 W longitude.

== Specifications ==
- Launch mass: 3,674 kilograms (8,100 lb)
- Power: 2 deployable solar arrays, batteries
- Stabilization: 3-axis
- Propulsion: LEROS-1C
- Longitude: 61.5° west

== See also ==
- 1997 in spaceflight
