= EchoStar VIII =

Communications satellite

EchoStar VII
- Mission type: Communication
- Operator: EchoStar
- COSPAR ID: 2002-039A
- SATCAT no.: 27501
- Mission duration: 12 years planned

Spacecraft properties
- Bus: LS-1300
- Manufacturer: SSL
- Launch mass: 4,660 kg (10,270 lb)

Start of mission
- Launch date: August 22, 2002, 05:15 UTC
- Rocket: Proton-K/Blok-DM3
- Launch site: Baikonur 81/23

End of mission
- Deactivated: April 16, 2017

Orbital parameters
- Reference system: Geocentric
- Regime: Geostationary
- Longitude: 110° West

Transponders
- Band: 32 K_{u} band
- Coverage area: Contiguous United States and Mexico

EchoStar VIII was an American geostationary communications satellite which is operated by EchoStar. It was positioned in geostationary orbit at a longitude of 110° West, from where it was used to provide high-definition television direct broadcasting services to the Contiguous United States.

EchoStar VIII was built by Space Systems/Loral, based on the LS-1300 satellite bus. It is equipped with 32 Ku band transponders, and at launch it had a mass of 4,660 kilograms (10,270 lb), with an expected operational lifespan of around 12 years. The launch occurred from Baikonur Cosmodrome on 22 August 2002.

The satellite experienced an anomaly on April 16, 2017, and was moved to the graveyard orbit.

== See also ==
- 2002 in spaceflight
