= Vietnam Posts and Telecommunications Group =

Vietnamese telecommunications company

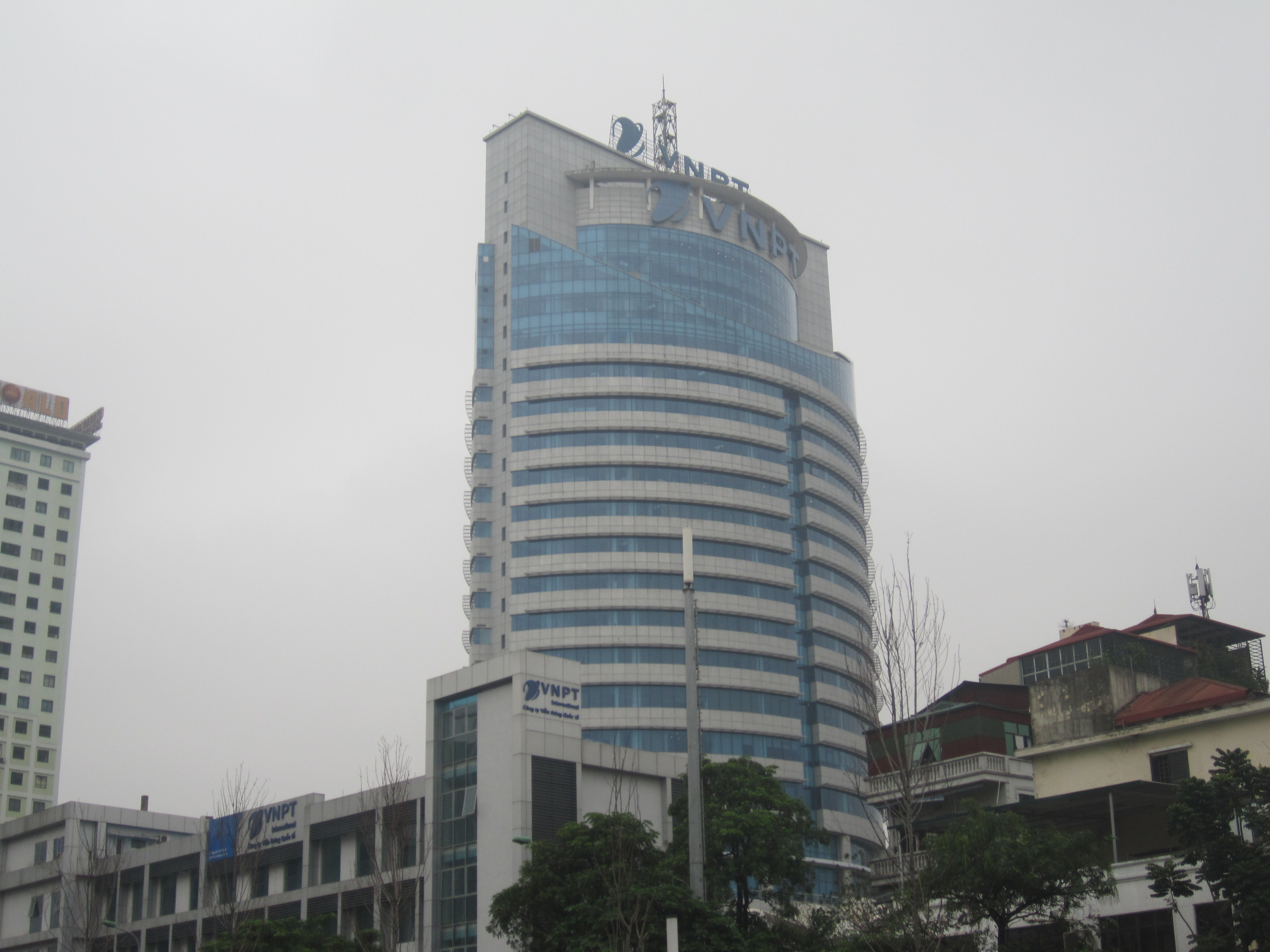
- Trade name: VNPT
- Native name: Tập đoàn Bưu chính Viễn thông Việt Nam
- Company type: State-owned company
- Industry: Telecommunications
- Founded: 26 March 2006; 20 years ago
- Headquarters: 57 Huynh Thuc Khang Str., Lang Ha Ward, Dong Da District, Hanoi, Vietnam
- Key people: Tô Dung Thai, Chairman; Huynh Quang Liem, President & CEO
- Products: Switching Equipment; Power Supply Equipment; Transmission Equipment; Terminal Equipment; Connection Equipment & Accessories; Lightning Protection Equipment; Optical Cables; Copper Cables; Software Manufactures
- Brands: VinaPhone
- Services: Data Transmission Services; Video Transmission Services; Satellite Services; Information System Solutions; Telephone Services; Postal Services
- Revenue: 144.747 trillion VND (around $6.5bn)
- Operating income: 9.126 trillion VND (around $400m)
- Owner: Ministry of Finance
- Number of employees: >30,000
- Website: vnpt.com.vn

Vietnam Posts and Telecommunications Group (Vietnamese: Tập đoàn Bưu chính Viễn thông Việt Nam), operating as its initialism VNPT, is a telecommunications company, owned by the Ministry of Finance, and was once the national post office of Vietnam. According to a list of UNDP in 2007, it is the second-largest company in Vietnam. It owns VinaPhone, one of the three largest mobile network operators in Vietnam.

VNPT was established on 30 April 1995. On 26 March 2006, it was formally restructured and operated under a new model. According to the decision of the Prime Minister, VNPT converted from the Corporation model to the Group model.

On 24 June 2010, VNPT changed its operating mode. According to Decision No. 955/QD-TTg of the Prime Minister of Vietnam, VNPT converted to a single-member limited liability company model owned by the State. In 2010, VNPT was awarded the title of Hero of Labor by the Vietnamese government for its many achievements from 1999 to 2008.

VNPT is granted the right by the Vietnamese Government to operate and exploit the two Vietnamese satellites VINASAT-1 and VINASAT-2.

On May 5, 2026, the Ministry of Science and Technology proposed transferring ownership of VNPT.
