= EchoStar IV =

Communications satellite

- Mission type: Communications
- Operator: EchoStar
- COSPAR ID: 1998-028A
- SATCAT no.: 25331
- Mission duration: 12 years

Spacecraft properties
- Bus: A2100AX
- Manufacturer: Lockheed Martin
- Launch mass: 3,478 kg (7,668 lb)
- Dry mass: 1,400 kg (3,100 lb)
- Power: 10 kW

Start of mission
- Launch date: May 7, 1998, 23:45 UTC
- Rocket: Proton-K/Blok-DM3
- Launch site: Baikonur 81/23

End of mission
- Deactivated: July 2011

Orbital parameters
- Reference system: Geocentric
- Regime: Geostationary
- Longitude: 77° west
- Semi-major axis: 42,538.0 kilometers (26,431.9 mi)
- Perigee altitude: 36,085.2 kilometers (22,422.3 mi)
- Apogee altitude: 36,250.7 kilometers (22,525.1 mi)
- Inclination: 7.0 degrees
- Period: 1,455.3 minutes
- Epoch: May 14, 2017

Transponders
- Band: 32 K_{u} band
- Frequency: Uplink: 17.3 - 17.8 GHz; Downlink: 12.2 - 12.7 GHz
- Bandwidth: 24 MHz
- Coverage area: United States, Mexico and Puerto Rico
- EIRP: 53 dBW

EchoStar IV is a communications satellite operated by EchoStar. Launched in 1998 it was operated in geostationary orbit at a longitude of 77 degrees west for 12 years.

== Satellite ==
The launch of EchoStar IV made use of a Proton rocket flying from Site 81 at the Baikonur Cosmodrome, Kazakhstan. The launch took place at 23:45 UTC on May 7, 1998, with the spacecraft entering a geosynchronous transfer orbit. EchoStar IV carried 32 Ku band transponders to provide direct voice and video communications to small dishes in North America after parking over 119° W or 148° W longitude.

== Specifications ==
- Launch mass: 3,478 kilograms (7,668 lb)
- Power: 2 deployable solar arrays, batteries
- Stabilization: 3-axis
- Propulsion: LEROS-1C
- Longitude: 77° west

== See also ==
- 1998 in spaceflight
