= EchoStar II =

Communications satellite

- Mission type: Communications
- Operator: EchoStar
- COSPAR ID: 1996-055A
- SATCAT no.: 24313
- Mission duration: 12 years

Spacecraft properties
- Bus: AS-7000
- Manufacturer: Lockheed Martin
- Launch mass: 2,885 kg (6,360 lb)
- Dry mass: 2,000 kg (4,400 lb)
- Power: 7 kW

Start of mission
- Launch date: September 11, 1996, 00:59 UTC
- Rocket: Ariane-42P H10-3
- Launch site: Kourou ELA-2

End of mission
- Deactivated: July 14, 2008

Orbital parameters
- Reference system: Geocentric
- Regime: Geostationary
- Longitude: 80° West (current position)
- Semi-major axis: 42,146.0 km (26,188.3 mi)
- Perigee altitude: 35,764.4 km (22,223.0 mi)
- Apogee altitude: 35,787.2 km (22,237.1 mi)
- Inclination: 7.1 degrees
- Period: 1,435.2 minutes
- Epoch: November 28, 2017

Transponders
- Band: 16 K_{u} band
- Frequency: Uplink: 17.3 - 17.8 GHz; Downlink: 12.2 - 12.7 GHz
- Bandwidth: 24 MHz
- Coverage area: Contiguous United States
- EIRP: 53 dBW

EchoStar II is a communications satellite operated by EchoStar. Launched in 1996 it was operated in geostationary orbit at a longitude of 148 degrees west for 12 or 15 years.

== Satellite ==
The launch of EchoStar I made use of an Ariane 4 rocket flying from Guiana Space Centre in Kourou, French Guiana. The launch took place at 00:59 UTC on September 11, 1996, with the spacecraft entering a geosynchronous transfer orbit. The spacecraft carried 16 Ku band transponders to enable direct broadcast communications and television channels through 0.5 metres (1 ft 8 in) dishes on the ground in the Contiguous United States.

From September 1996 to November 2001, it was at position 118.8° W, while from December 2001 until July 2008, it was at position 148° W. The satellite ended its activities on July 14, 2008.

== Specifications ==
- Launch mass: 2,885 kilograms (6,360 lb)
- Power source: 2 deployable solar arrays, batteries
- Stabilization: 3-axis
- Propulsion: 2 × LEROS-1B

== See also ==
- 1996 in spaceflight
