= EchoStar V =

Communications satellite

EchoStar V (Ciel-1, Sky 1A, MCI 1)
- Mission type: Communications
- Operator: EchoStar (1999-2009); Ciel Satellite Group (2005-2009)
- COSPAR ID: 1999-050A
- SATCAT no.: 25913
- Mission duration: Planned: 12 years Final: 9 years, 10 months

Spacecraft properties
- Bus: SSL-1300
- Manufacturer: SSL
- Launch mass: 3,602 kg (7,941 lb)
- Dry mass: 1,500 kg (3,300 lb)

Start of mission
- Launch date: September 23, 1999, 06:02 UTC
- Rocket: Atlas-II AS
- Launch site: Cape Canaveral LC-36A
- Contractor: NASA

End of mission
- Deactivated: July 2009

Orbital parameters
- Reference system: Geocentric
- Regime: Geostationary
- Longitude: 148° west
- Epoch: September 28, 2017

Transponders
- Band: 32 K_{u} band
- Coverage area: United States and Puerto Rico

EchoStar V was a communications satellite built by Space Systems/Loral based in Palo Alto, CA and operated by EchoStar. Launched in 1999 it was operated in geostationary orbit at a longitude of 148 degrees west. EchoStar V was used for direct-to-home television broadcasting services.

== Satellite ==
The launch of EchoStar V made use of an Atlas rocket flying from Launch Complex 36 at the Cape Canaveral Air Force Station, United States. The launch took place at 06:02 UTC on September 23, 1999, with the spacecraft entering a geosynchronous transfer orbit.

== Specifications ==
- Launch mass: 3,602 kilograms (7,941 lb)
- Power: 2 deployable solar arrays, batteries
- Stabilization: 3-axis
- Longitude: 148° West

== See also ==
- 1999 in spaceflight
