= EchoStar =

Global satellite services provider

EchoStar Corporation
- Type: Public
- Traded as: Nasdaq: ECHO (Class A); S&P 500 component
- Industry: Telecommunications; Satellite television
- Predecessor: The first incarnation of EchoStar (Dish Network)
- Founded: January 1, 2008; 18 years ago
- Headquarters: Englewood, Colorado, U.S.; Arapahoe County, Colorado (satellite HQ)
- Key people: Charles Ergen (chairman); Hamid Akhavan (CEO)
- Products: Direct-broadcast satellite; Pay television; Pay-per-view; Streaming platform; Mobile telephony; Wireless broadband
- Revenue: ▼US$15.005 billion (2025)
- Operating income: ▼ −US$17.7 billion (2025)
- Net income: ▼ −US$14.5 billion (2025)
- Total assets: ▼US$43.016 billion (2025)
- Total equity: ▼US$5.766 billion (2025)
- Number of employees: 12,100 (2025)
- Subsidiaries: Dish Network; Boost Mobile; EchoStar Mobile; Hughes Network Systems
- Website: echostar.com

EchoStar Corporation is an American telecommunications company, specializing in satellite communication, wireless telecommunications, and internet services. Echostar also provides multichannel video programming and mobile services through its subsidiaries: Dish Network, Boost Mobile, Sling TV, EchoStar Mobile, and Hughes Network Systems.

Originally establishing the Dish Network brand name in 1996, EchoStar later reacquired Dish as a wholly owned subsidiary in 2023. EchoStar was included on the Fortune 500 list in 2024, ranking #242.

== History ==
EchoStar was originally formed in 1980 by its chairman Charles Ergen as a distributor of C band TV systems. In 1987, it applied for a direct broadcast satellite (DBS) license with the Federal Communications Commission (FCC), and was granted access to orbital slot 119° west longitude in 1992.

On December 28, 1995, the firm successfully launched its first satellite, EchoStar I. On March 4, 1996, it established the Dish Network brand name to market its home satellite TV system.

On January 2, 2008, the Dish Network business was spun-off from the technology and infrastructure side of the business. A split in the shares created two companies; the former EchoStar Communications Corporation changed its name to Dish Network Corporation which consisted mainly of the Dish Network business, and EchoStar Corporation, which retained ownership of the technology side including the satellites, Sling Media, and the set-top box development arm. Dish Network completed its distribution to EchoStar of its digital set-top box business, certain infrastructure, and other assets and related liabilities, including certain of their satellites, uplink and satellite transmission assets, and real estate. Following the spin-off, EchoStar and Dish Network operated as separate, publicly traded companies, until they were reunited in 2023.

On February 14, 2011, EchoStar announced that it would acquire Hughes Communications in a deal valued at US$1.3 billion.

On January 31, 2017, EchoStar announced that it had reached an agreement with DISH to transfer the EchoStar Technologies businesses, which designed, developed and distributed digital set-top boxes, provided satellite uplinking and broadcast services and developed and supported streaming video technology back to DISH. The transaction was completed on January 31, 2017, substantially returning DISH to its pre-2008 status as a set-top-box hardware manufacturer.

In March 2017, after two delays caused by weather concerns, SpaceX delivered EchoStar XXIII into orbit. The satellite was launched on a Falcon 9 Rocket and provides broadcast services for Brazil. Because EchoStar XXIII is a heavy satellite, this mission did not include a rocket landing post-takeoff, as it would require too much fuel. This was the first time a purely commercial satellite was launched from a pad that once served as the base for Apollo moon trips and space shuttle flights.

On May 20, 2019, EchoStar announced that it had reached an agreement with Dish Network Corporation to transfer the portion of the business which managed and provided broadcast satellite services, referred to as the BSS (Broadcast Satellite Services) business, to Dish in order to concentrate on broadband services and other initiatives. The transaction was completed on September 10, 2019.

On August 8, 2023, The Hollywood Reporter reported that Ergen was proposing a remerger between Dish and EchoStar. Later that day, the acquisition was formally announced by both companies. On January 2, 2024, it was announced that the transaction had been completed on December 31, 2023.

In May 2024, EchoStar announced that it has been awarded a U.S. Navy wireless and telecommunications contract to provide 5G smart devices and services for the Department of Defense and federal agencies.

In May 2024, Dish Network and Hughes Network Systems announced a new bundle of Dish satellite TV with Hughesnet satellite internet.

On September 30, 2024, EchoStar announced that it would divest its video distribution unit, Dish Network, to rival DirecTV in a debt exchange transaction that includes a payment of $1 and the assumption of approximately $9.8 billion in debt. The deal also included $2.5 billion of financing from TPG Angelo Gordon and other co-investors to allow EchoStar to refinance the company's November 2024 debt maturity. The deal would've allowed EchoStar to reduce its debt and refocus its resources toward its wireless Boost Mobile and satellite connectivity businesses. The deal was expected to close in the fourth quarter of 2025, contingent on regulatory approval and bondholders writing off nearly $1.6 billion in Dish-related debt. In November, DirecTV called off the deal due to opposition from EchoStar bondholders.

On June 6, 2025, it was reported that EchoStar was preparing to file for Chapter 11 bankruptcy protection after the FCC had effectively frozen its decision-making for its Boost Mobile subsidiary. EchoStar is facing an FCC probe, investigating whether the corporation is hitting 5G deployment requirements in order to keep its spectrum licenses. SpaceX is also a rival to EchoStar for two GHz band spectrum licenses. Other contributing factors to the FCC investigation included over $500 million in missed interest payments and the termination of the Dish Network acquisition by DirecTV.

In June 2025, EchoStar reported market penetration of 75% of new subscribers in certain markets for mobile communications. This was "in exchange for the Federal Communications Commission extending buildout deadlines elsewhere last year" and "had already met its other commitments, which include 24,000 5G sites nationwide and a low-cost plan, among other things". Meeting the deadlines for progress in building its networks based on satellites is a serious matter for EchoStar, as another provider has challenged the company's right to its license for 2 GHz spectrum from the FCC, and that challenge has made it difficult to borrow funds for construction and stay afloat until the license is assured. The new FCC chairman is reviewing the situation, and the administration urges a deal to keep the company afloat.

On August 26, 2025, AT&T announced that it would acquire spectrum licenses from EchoStar for $23 billion, in a cash deal expected to close in mid-2026. On September 8, 2025, SpaceX announced it had struck a $17 billion cash and stock deal to purchase the rights to some of EchoStar's wireless spectrum licenses. Echostar said it believed that the two spectrum deals with AT&T and SpaceX would resolve the FCC's inquiries.

In November 2025, EchoStar announced that founder Charlie Ergen will return as CEO amid a $19.6B SpaceX spectrum deal.

On June 29, 2026, EchoStar announced that Dish DBS, which operates Dish Network's satellite pay-TV business, as well as Sling TV and Boost Mobile, would file for Chapter 11 bankruptcy protection by June 30. EchoStar blamed the decision on heavy debt and subscriber losses, as well as legal troubles with federal regulators on whether it has met obligations to deploy wireless spectrum licenses.

EchoStar completed the sale of its 3.45 GHz and 600 MHz licenses to AT&T for $23 billion on July 28, 2026.

On August 2, 2026, EchoStar's Hughes Network Systems unit filed for bankruptcy protection when it could not pay down debt that matured on August 1, 2026.

== Satellite fleet ==
Orbital locations may change

Since EchoStar frequently moves satellites among its many orbiting slots this list is not necessarily up-to-date.

EchoStar satellites
| Satellite | Location | Launch date | Launcher | Satellite bus | Status |
|---|---|---|---|---|---|
| EchoStar I | | December 28, 1995 | Long March 2E/EPKM | | Decommissioned |
| EchoStar II | | September 11, 1996 | Ariane 42P H10-3 | | Decommissioned |
| EchoStar III (DBSC 1) | | October 5, 1997 | Atlas IIAS | | Decommissioned |
| EchoStar IV | | May 7, 1998 | Proton-K/DM-03 | | Decommissioned |
| EchoStar V | | September 23, 1999 | Atlas IIAS | | Decommissioned |
| EchoStar VI | | July 14, 2000 | Atlas IIAS | | Decommissioned |
| EchoStar VII | | February 21, 2002 | Atlas IIIB-DEC | | Decommissioned |
| EchoStar VIII | | August 22, 2002 | Proton-K/DM-03 | | Decommissioned |
| EchoStar IX (Galaxy 23) | 121° W | August 8, 2003 | Zenit-3SL | FS-1300 | In service |
| EchoStar X | 110° W | February 15, 2006 | Zenit-3SL | A2100AXS | In service |
| EchoStar XI | | July 16, 2008 | Zenit-3SL | | In service |
| EchoStar XII (Rainbow 1) | 61°W | July 17, 2003 | Atlas V521 | | In service |
| EchoStar XIII (CMBstar 1) | | - | Proton-M/Briz-M | | Cancelled |
| EchoStar XIV | 119° W | March 20, 2010 | Proton-M/Briz-M | | In service |
| EchoStar XV | 61.5° W | July 10, 2010 | Proton-M/Briz-M | LS-1300 | In service |
| EchoStar XVI | 61.5° W | November 20, 2012 | Proton-M/Briz-M | LS-1300 | In service |
| EchoStar XVII (Jupiter 1) | 107.0° W | July 5, 2012 | Ariane 5 | LS-1300 | In service |
| EchoStar XVIII | | June 18, 2016 | Ariane 5ECA | | In service |
| EchoStar XIX (Jupiter 2) | 97.1° W | December 18, 2016 | Atlas V431 | SSL 1300 | In service |
| EchoStar XXIII | 109.9° W | March 16, 2017 | Falcon 9 | SSL 1300 | In service |
| EchoStar XXIV (Jupiter 3) | 105.2° W | July 29, 2023 | Falcon Heavy | SSL 1300 | In service |
| EchoStar XXV | | March 10, 2026 | Falcon 9 | | In service |
| EchoStar 105 (SES-11) | 105.0° W | October 11, 2017 | Falcon 9 | Eurostar E3000 | In service |
