= AMC-10 (satellite) =

American geostationary communications satellite

- Names: GE-10; AMC-10 (2004-present)
- Mission type: Communications
- Operator: SES Americom (2004-2009); SES World Skies (2009-2011); SES S.A. (2011-present)
- COSPAR ID: 2004-003A
- SATCAT no.: 28154
- Mission duration: 15 years (planned); 21 years, 1 month, 1 day (elapsed)

Spacecraft properties
- Spacecraft: GE-10
- Spacecraft type: Lockheed Martin A2100
- Bus: A2100A
- Manufacturer: Lockheed Martin
- Launch mass: 2,315 kg (5,104 lb)

Start of mission
- Launch date: 5 February 2004, 23:46:02 UTC
- Rocket: Atlas IIAS (AC-165)
- Launch site: Cape Canaveral, LC-36A
- Contractor: Lockheed Martin
- Entered service: April 2004

Orbital parameters
- Reference system: Geocentric orbit
- Regime: Geostationary orbit
- Longitude: 135° West

Transponders
- Band: 24 C-band
- Coverage area: Canada, United States, Mexico, Caribbean

AMC-10 (formerly GE-10) is an American geostationary communications satellite that was launched by an Atlas-IIAS launch vehicle at 23:46:02 UTC on 5 February 2004. The 2,315 kg (5,104 lb) satellite will provide high-definition digital video channels to North America through its 24 C-band transponders, over 135° West longitude. It will replace the current GE Satcom C-4 satellite after a few months of tests.
