= EchoStar I =

Communications satellite

- Mission type: Communications
- Operator: EchoStar
- COSPAR ID: 1995-073A
- SATCAT no.: 23754
- Mission duration: 12 years

Spacecraft properties
- Bus: AS-7000
- Manufacturer: Lockheed Martin Astro Space
- Launch mass: 3,287 kilograms (7,247 lb)
- Dimensions: 4.08 × 2.22 × 2.54 m (13.4 × 7.3 × 8.3 ft)
- Power: 5 kW

Start of mission
- Launch date: December 28, 1995, 11:50 UTC
- Rocket: Long March 2E EPKM
- Launch site: Xichang LC-2

Orbital parameters
- Reference system: Geocentric
- Regime: Geostationary
- Longitude: 77° West
- Semi-major axis: 42,164.0 kilometers (26,199.5 mi)
- Perigee altitude: 35,780.7 kilometers (22,233.1 mi)
- Apogee altitude: 35,806.7 kilometers (22,249.3 mi)
- Inclination: 0.7 degrees
- Period: 1,436.1 minutes
- Epoch: May 14, 2017

Transponders
- Band: 16 K_{u} band
- Coverage area: Contiguous United States
- EIRP: 53 dBW

EchoStar I was a communications satellite operated by EchoStar. Launched in 1995, it was operated in geostationary orbit at a longitude of 77 degrees west for 12 or 15 years. The company has approved the transfer of the 77 degree west orbital position to QuetzSat as of September 22, 2010. It appears to be retired as of 2023.

== Satellite ==
The launch of EchoStar made use of a Long March rocket flying from Xichang Satellite Launch Center in Sichuan province of the People's Republic of China. The launch took place at 11:50 UTC on December 28, 1995, with the spacecraft entering a geosynchronous transfer orbit. The spacecraft carried 16 Ku band transponders to enable direct broadcast communications and television channels through 0.5-metre (1 ft 8 in) dishes on the ground in the American continents.

== Specifications ==
- Launch mass: 3,287 kilograms (7,247 lb)
- Power source: 2 deployable solar arrays, batteries
- Stabilization: 3-axis
- Propulsion: 2 × LEROS-1B
- Telemetry in the C band: 4.1986 & 4.1996 GHz
- Command: 5.926 & 6.423 GHz

== See also ==
- 1995 in spaceflight
