= Television receive-only =

Reception of satellite television from FSS-type satellites

Television receive-only (TVRO) is a term used chiefly in North America and South America to refer to the reception of satellite television from FSS-type satellites, generally on C-band analog; free-to-air and unconnected to a commercial DBS provider. TVRO was the main means of consumer satellite reception in the United States and Canada until the mid-1990s with the proliferation of encryption and the arrival of direct-broadcast satellite television services such as PrimeStar, USSB, Bell Satellite TV, DirecTV, Dish Network, Sky TV that transmit K_{u} signals. While these services are at least theoretically based on open standards (DVB-S, MPEG-2, MPEG-4), the majority of services are encrypted and require proprietary decoder hardware. TVRO systems relied on feeds being transmitted unencrypted and using open standards, which heavily contrasts to DBS systems in the region.

The term is also used to refer to receiving digital television "backhaul" feeds from FSS-type satellites. Reception of free-to-air satellite signals, generally K_{u} band Digital Video Broadcasting, for home viewing is still common in Europe and India, although the TVRO nomenclature was never used there. Free-to-air satellite signals are also very common in the People's Republic of China, as many rural locations cannot receive cable television and solely rely on satellites to deliver television signals to individual homes.

== "Big ugly dish" ==
The term "BUD" (big ugly dish) is a colloquialism for C-Band satellite dishes used by TVRO systems. BUDs range from 4 to 16 feet in diameter, with the most popular large size being 10 feet. The name comes from their perception as an eyesore.

== History ==
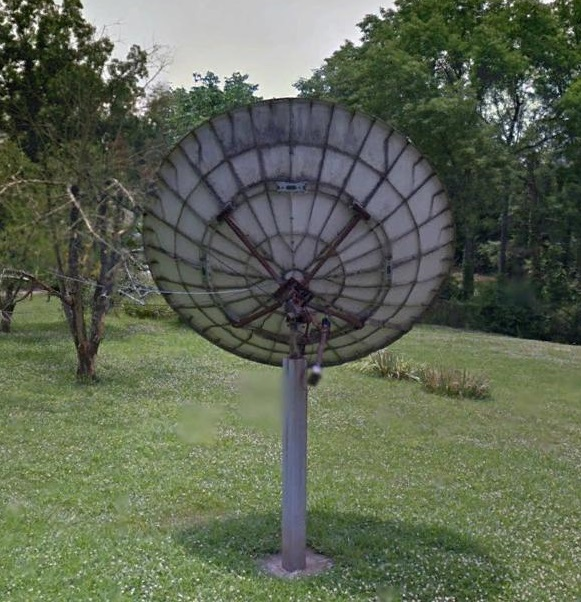
The back side of a C-Band satellite dish showing the pole, mount, motor, counterweight, and structure of the dish.

TVRO systems were originally marketed in the late 1970s. On October 18, 1979, the FCC began allowing people to have home satellite earth stations without a federal government license. The dishes were nearly 20 feet (6.1 m) in diameter, were remote controlled, and could only pick up HBO signals from one of two satellites.

Originally, the dishes used for satellite TV reception were 12 to 16 feet in diameter and made of solid fiberglass with an embedded metal coating, with later models being 4 to 10 feet and made of wire mesh and solid steel or aluminum. Early dishes cost more than $5,000, and sometimes as much as $10,000. The wider the dish was, the better its ability to provide adequate channel reception. Programming sent from ground stations was relayed from 18 satellites in geostationary orbit located 22,300 miles above the Earth. The dish had to be pointed directly at the satellite, with nothing blocking the signal. Weaker signals required larger dishes.

The dishes worked by receiving a low-power C-Band (3.7–4.2 GHz) frequency-modulated analog signal directly from the original distribution satellite – the same signal received by cable television headends. Because analog channels took up an entire transponder on the satellite, and each satellite had a fixed number of transponders, dishes were usually equipped with a modified polar mount and actuator to sweep the dish across the horizon to receive channels from multiple satellites. Switching between horizontal and vertical polarization was accomplished by a small electric servo motor that moved a probe inside the feedhorn throat at the command of the receiver (commonly called a "polarotor" setup). Higher-end receivers did this transparently, switching polarization and moving the dish automatically as the user changed channels.

By Spring of 1984, 18 C-Band satellites were in use for United States domestic communications, owned by five different companies.

Satellite name	Owner	Orbital location (degrees longitude)
Comstar 1	Comsat/AT&T	76
Comstar 2	Comsat/AT&T	76
Comstar 3	Comsat/AT&T	87
Comstar 4	Comsat/AT&T	127
Telstar 301	Comsat/AT&T	96
Galaxy 1	Hughes Communications	134
Galaxy 2	Hughes Communications	74
Satcom 1	RCA	139
Satcom 1R	RCA	139
Satcom 2	RCA	131
Satcom 2R	RCA	72
Satcom 3R	RCA	131
Satcom 4	RCA	84
Satcom 5	RCA	143
Westar 1	Western Union	79
Westar 3	Western Union	91
Westar 4	Western Union	99
Westar 5	Western Union	123

The retail price for satellite receivers soon dropped, with some dishes costing as little as $2,000 by mid-1984. Dishes pointing to one satellite were even cheaper. Once a user paid for a dish, it was possible to receive even premium movie channels, raw feeds of news broadcasts or television stations from other areas. People in areas without local broadcast stations, and people in areas without cable television, could obtain good-quality reception with no monthly fees. Two open questions existed about this practice: whether the Communications Act of 1934 applied as a case of "unauthorized reception" by TVRO consumers; and to what extent it was legal for a service provider to encrypt their signals in an effort to prevent its reception.

The Cable Communications Policy Act of 1984 clarified all of these matters, making the following legal:

- Reception of unencrypted satellite signals by a consumer
- Reception of encrypted satellite signals by a consumer, when they have received authorization to legally decrypt it

This created a framework for the wide deployment of encryption on analog satellite signals. It further created a framework (and implicit mandate to provide) subscription services to TVRO consumers to allow legal decryption of those signals. HBO and Cinemax became the first two services to announce intent to encrypt their satellite feeds late in 1984. Others were strongly considering doing so as well. Where cable providers could compete with TVRO subscription options, it was thought this would provide sufficient incentive for competition.

HBO and Cinemax began encrypting their west coast feeds services with VideoCipher II 12 hours a day early in 1985, then did the same with their east coast feeds by August. The two networks began scrambling full time on January 15, 1986, which in many contemporary news reports was called "S-Day". This met with much protest from owners of big-dish systems, most of which had no other option at the time for receiving such channels. As required by the Cable Communications Policy act of 1984, HBO allowed dish owners to subscribe directly to their service, although at a price ($12.95 per month) higher than what cable subscribers were paying. This sentiment, and a collapse in the sales of TVRO equipment in early 1986, led to the April 1986 attack on HBO's transponder on Galaxy 1. Dish sales went down from 600,000 in 1985 to 350,000 in 1986, but pay television services were seeing dishes as something positive since some people would never have cable service, and the industry was starting to recover as a result. Through 1986, other channels that began full time encryption included Showtime and The Movie Channel on May 27, and CNN and CNN Headline News on July 1. Scrambling would also lead to the development of pay-per-view, as demonstrated by the early adoption of encryption by Request Television, and Viewer's Choice. Channels scrambled (encrypted) with VideoCipher and VideoCipher II could be defeated, and there was a black market for illegal descramblers.

By the end of 1987, 16 channels had employed encryption with another 7 planned in the first half of 1988. Packages that offered reduced rates for channels in bulk had begun to appear. At this time, the vast majority of analog satellite TV transponders still were not encrypted. On November 1, 1988, NBC began scrambling its C-band signal but left its K_{u} band signal unencrypted in order for affiliates to not lose viewers who could not see their advertising. Most of the two million satellite dish users in the United States still used C-band. ABC and CBS were considering scrambling, though CBS was reluctant due to the number of people unable to receive local network affiliates.

The growth of dishes receiving K_{u} band signals in North America was limited by the Challenger disaster, since 75 satellites were to be launched prior to the suspension of the Space Shuttle program. Only seven K_{u} band satellites were in use.

In addition to encryption, DBS services such as PrimeStar had been reducing the popularity for TVRO systems since the early 1990s. Signals from DBS satellites (operating in the more recent K_{u} band) are higher in both frequency and power (due to improvements in the solar panels and energy efficiency of modern satellites) and therefore require much smaller dishes than C-band, and the digital signals now used require far less signal strength at the receiver, resulting in a lower cost of entry. Each satellite also can carry up to 32 transponders in the K_{u} band, but only 24 in the C band, and several digital subchannels can be multiplexed (MCPC) or carried separately (SCPC) on a single transponder. General advances, such as HEMT, in noise reduction at microwave frequencies have also had an effect. However, a consequence of the higher frequency used for DBS services is rain fade where viewers lose signal during a heavy downpour. C-band's immunity to rain fade is one of the major reasons the system is still used as the preferred method for television broadcasters to distribute their signal.

=== Popularity ===
TVRO systems were most popular in rural areas, beyond the broadcast range of most local television stations. The mountainous terrain of West Virginia, for example, makes reception of over-the-air television broadcasts (especially in the higher UHF frequencies) very difficult. From the late 1970s to the early 1990s DBS systems were not available, and cable television systems of the time only carried a few channels, resulting in a boom in sales of systems in the area, which led to the systems being termed the "West Virginia state flower". The term was regional, known mostly to those living in West Virginia and surrounding areas. Another reason was the large sizes of the dishes. The first satellite systems consisted of "BUDs" twelve to sixteen feet in diameter. They became much more popular in the mid-1980s when dish sizes decreased to about six to ten feet, but have always been a source of much consternation (even local zoning disputes) due to their perception as an eyesore. Neighborhoods with restrictive covenants usually still prohibit this size of dish, except where such restrictions are illegal. Support for systems dried up when strong encryption was introduced around 1994. Many long-disconnected dishes still occupy their original spots.

== TVRO on ships ==
The term TVRO has been in use on ships since it was introduced in the 1980s. One early provider of equipment was SeaTel with its first generation of stabilized satellite antennas that was launched in 1985, the TV-at-Sea 8885 system. Until this time ships had not been able to receive television signals from satellites due to their rocking motion rendering reception impossible. The SeaTel antenna however was stabilized using electrically driven gyroscopes and thus made it possible to point to the satellite accurately enough, that is to within 2°, in order to receive a signal. The successful implementation of stabilised TVRO systems on ships immediately led to the development of maritime VSAT systems. The second generation of SeaTel TVRO systems came in 1994 and was the 2494 antenna, which got its gyro signal from the ship rather than its own gyros, improving accuracy and reducing maintenance.

As of 2010, SeaTel continues to dominate the market for stabilized TVRO systems and has according to the Comsys group, a market share of 75%. Other established providers of stabilised satellite antennas are Intellian, KNS, Orbit, EPAK and KVH.

== Current uses ==
Most of the free analogue channels that BUDs were built to receive have been taken offline. Due to the number of systems in existence, their lack of usefulness, and because many people consider them an eyesore, used BUDs can be purchased for very little money. As of 2009, there are 23 C-band satellites and 38 K_{u}/K_{a} band satellites.

There were over 150 channels for people who want to receive subscription channels on a C-band dish via Motorola's 4DTV equipment via two vendors Satellite Receivers Ltd (SRL) and Skyvision. The 4DTV subscription system shutdown on August 16, 2016.

The dishes themselves can be modified to receive free-to-air and DBS signals. The stock LNBs fitted to typical BUDs will usually need to be replaced with one of a lower noise temperature to receive digital broadcasts. With a suitable replacement LNB (provided there is no warping of the reflector) a BUD can be used to receive free-to-air (FTA) and DBS signals. Several companies market LNBs, LNBFs, and adaptor collars for big-dish systems. For receiving FTA signals the replacement should be capable of dual C/K_{u} reception with linear polarization, for DBS it will need a high band K_{u} LNBF using circular polarization. Older mesh dishes with perforations larger than 5mm are inefficient at K_{u} frequencies, because the smaller wavelengths will pass through them. Solid fiberglass dishes usually contain metal mesh with large-diameter perforations as a reflector and are usually unsuitable for anything other than C band.

Large dishes have higher antenna gain, which can be an advantage when used with DBS signals such as Dish Network and DirecTV, virtually eliminating rain fade. Restored dishes fitted with block upconverters can be used to transmit signals as well. BUDs can still be seen at antenna farms for these reasons, so that video and backhauls can be sent to and from the television network with which a station is affiliated, without interruption due to inclement weather. BUDs are also still useful for picking-up weak signals at the edge of a satellite's broadcast "footprint" – the area at which a particular satellite is aimed. For this reason, BUDs are helpful in places like Alaska, or parts of the Caribbean.

=== Modern equivalents ===
Large parabolic antennas similar to BUDs are still in production. New dishes differ in their construction and materials. New mesh dishes have much smaller perforations and solid dishes are now made with steel instead of fiberglass. New systems usually include a universal LNB that is switched electronically between horizontal and vertical polarization, obviating the need for a failure-prone polar rotor. As a complete system they have a much lower noise temperature than old BUDs, and are generally better for digital K_{u} reception. The prices of these dishes have fallen dramatically since the first BUDs were produced for several thousand dollars to as little as $200 for an 8 ft mesh started BUD sold on eBay or amazon as of 2014. Typical uses for these systems include receiving free-to-air and subscription services.

== See also ==
- Direct-broadcast satellite television
- Polar mount
