= Integrated receiver/decoder =

Electronic device

An integrated receiver/decoder (IRD) is an electronic device used to receive a radio-frequency signal and convert digital information transmitted in it.

== Consumer IRDs ==
Consumer IRDs, commonly called set-top boxes, are used by end users and are much cheaper compared to professional IRDs. To curb content piracy, they also lack many features and interfaces found in professional IRDs such as outputting uncompressed SDI video or ASI transport stream dumps. They are also designed to be more aesthetically pleasing.

== Professional IRDs ==
Commonly found in radio, television, cable and satellite broadcasting facilities, the IRD is generally used for the reception of contribution feeds that are intended for re-broadcasting. The IRD is the interface between a receiving satellite dish or telco networks and a broadcasting facility video/audio infrastructure.

Professional IRDs have various features that consumer IRDs lack such as:

- SDI outputs.
- ASI inputs / outputs.
- TSoIP inputs.
- AES/EBU Audio decoding.
- VBI reinsertion.
- WSS data and pass through.
- Transport stream demultiplexing.
- Genlock input.
- Frame synchronization of digital video output to analogue input.
- Closed captions and VITS/ITS/VITC Insertion.
- Video test pattern generator.
- Remote management over LAN/WAN.
- GPI interface - For sending external alarm triggers.
- Rack mountable.

== Uses ==
- direct broadcast satellite (DBS) television applications like DirecTV, Astra or DishTV
- fixed service satellite (FSS) applications like VideoCipher, DigiCipher, or PowerVu
- digital audio radio satellite (DARS) applications like XM Satellite Radio and Sirius Satellite Radio
- digital audio broadcasting (DAB) applications like Eureka 147 and IBOC
- digital video broadcasting (DVB) applications like DVB-T and ATSC

== See also ==
- ATSC tuner
