= Satellite subcarrier audio =

Audio signal transmitted by satellite

Satellite subcarrier audio is audio transmitted by way of satellite that uses a separate analog or digital signal carried on a main radio transmission (usually video) on a specific satellite transponder. More technically, it is an already-modulated signal, which is then modulated into another signal of higher frequency and bandwidth. In a more general sense, satellite subcarrier audio is an early form of satellite radio not intended for the consumer market but was initially unencrypted, thus receivable to satellite hobbyists.

Original analog video only has one channel per transponder, with subcarriers for audio and automatic transmission identification service ATIS. Non-multiplexed radio stations can also travel in single channel per carrier (SCPC) mode, with multiple carriers (analog or digital) per transponder. This allows each station to transmit directly to the satellite, rather than paying for a whole transponder, or using landlines to send it to an earth station for multiplexing with other stations.

== Analog subcarriers ==
Satellite subcarrier audio was initially transmitted in analog form. This method of audio transmission was first employed by Fujitsu in 1973 as part of a data line between the United States and Spain. By the early 1980s, the use of analog subcarriers for radio network distribution had become well-established.

=== Standard subcarrier audio ===
Initially, satellite subcarrier audio was tuned using commercial receivers or consumer-grade TVRO "big dish" satellite receivers. The audio ranged in frequency from 5.0 to 8.5 MHz for both left and right audio channels. Fine tuning options included monaural and discrete stereo tuning with three bandwidth modes: narrow (130 kHz), normal (280 kHz) and wide (500 kHz).

=== Single channel per carrier (analog SCPC) ===
Single channel per carrier (SCPC) refers to using a single signal at a given frequency and bandwidth. Most often, this is used on broadcast satellites to indicate that radio stations are not multiplexed as subcarriers onto a single video carrier, but instead independently share a transponder. It may also be used on other communications satellites, or occasionally on non-satellite transmissions. In an SCPC system, satellite bandwidth is dedicated to a single source.

Analog SCPC subcarrier audio is received using dedicated satellite receivers. SCPC audio receivers tune a frequency range of 50 to 90 MHz with both wide and narrow bandwidth options. Receivers in the hobbyist price range included the Heil SC-One and the Universal Electronics SCPC-100 and SCPC-200.

=== FM Squared (FM²) ===
The FM Squared satellite audio format was developed in 1986 by Wegener Communications and Subcarrier Systems (later SpaceCom Systems, Inc.).

FM Squared is a method of transmitting analog satellite audio where video would normally be transmitted on a satellite transponder. FM Squared was once used to distribute Muzak and similar "business" music (sometimes referred to as elevator music) to retailers. FM Squared audio receivers tune a frequency range of 100 kHz to 9 MHz. Receivers that fell within the hobbyist price range included the Universal Electronics SC-50.

== Digital subcarriers ==
Although not widely used until the early 2000s, digital subcarrier audio has existed almost as long as its analog technology counterpart. In 1972, the BBC deployed a digital audio transmission system linking their broadcast center to their remote transmitters. This technology wasn't applied to satellite communications, however, until the early 1980s.

=== DATS and SEDAT ===
The first widespread digital satellite audio distribution system was Digital Audio Transmission System (DATS). DATS was developed in 1982 by Scientific Atlanta. The DATS distribution system was first used by the largest U.S. radio networks such as Westwood One, ABC Radio Networks and NBC. The DATS system transmitted up to four 15 kHz analog audio channels at a data rate of 1.544 Mbit/s (384 kbit/s each) between their originating radio studios and a C-band earth station where they were de-multiplexed, re-multiplexed, and uplinked with additional digital audio channels using BPSK digital modulation. The 15 kHz channels had a dynamic range of 81 dB which was suitable for FM broadcasting. The system could also support up to twice as many 7.5 kHz channels suitable for AM broadcast.

DATS was later superseded by the Spectrum Efficient Digital Audio Transmission (SEDAT) satellite audio distribution system. SEDAT allows more audio channels to be carried in the same frequency range as DATS. SEDAT, also developed by Scientific Atlanta, was primarily used by ABC Radio Networks. SEDAT transmissions ended in 2001.

=== Digital SCPC and MCPC ===
As digital subcarrier audio encoding and modulation methods have matured, less-expensive "standard" systems of satellite audio distribution have developed. This trend started with the emergence of VSAT technology in 1986 and was further supplanted by leased space on DBS systems such as DirecTV and Dish Network. The two de facto methods for digital satellite audio transmission are digital single channel per carrier and multiple channel per carrier multiplexing.

In digital radio systems, several variable bit-rate data streams are multiplexed together to a fixed bitrate transport stream by means of statistical multiplexing. This makes it possible to transfer several video and audio channels simultaneously over the same frequency channel, together with various services. On communications satellites that carry broadcast television networks and radio networks, this is known as multiple channel per carrier or MCPC. Where multiplexing is not practical (such as where there are different sources using a single transponder), single channel per carrier mode (SCPC) is used. Digital SCPC differs from the older analog SCPC transmission method in that a digital SCPC signal carries more than just a single audio channel (two are used) but also coding and decoding information, ancillary and control data, and network identification data. Digital SCPC and MCPC subcarrier transmissions use satellite broadcast standards such as DVB-S and its successor DVB-S2 along with MPEG-2 and MPEG-4 compression formats, respectively. BPSK modulation has been replaced with newer modulation schemes such as QPSK (quadrature phase-shift keying).

=== StarGuide ===
StarGuide was the second-generation system of digital audio distribution via satellite. Many of the largest U.S. radio networks upgraded from or supplanted DATS/SEDAT audio feeds with StarGuide II and III audio receivers. The StarGuide platform is a proprietary MCPC digital audio distribution system that uses proprietary MX3 multiplexing technology. The StarGuide II receiver handles data rates from 0.512 to 6.144 Mbit/s (in MX3 mode) and up to 8.192 Mbit/s in normal mode. The StarGuide III receiver can handle data rates up to 25 Mbit/s and is capable of a larger number of data and code rates than its predecessor. Both the StarGuide II and III receivers can use proprietary StarGuide Service Module expansion cards, including the ability to interface with local area networks (LAN) using 10/100 Ethernet connections.

=== X-Digital (XDS) format ===
The X-Digital Systems format is (as of 2011) the newest generation of digital satellite subcarrier audio technology used by the large radio networks in the United States. In 2007, X-Digital Systems acquired specific assets and patent licensing of StarGuide Digital Networks technology from DG FastChannel, Inc. The X-Digital Systems platform has been deployed by Clear Channel Communications, Premiere Networks (now an iHeartMedia subsidiary) and Citadel Broadcasting (who also owns the former ABC Radio Networks).
