= Solar transit =

Period where an object moves in front of the Sun

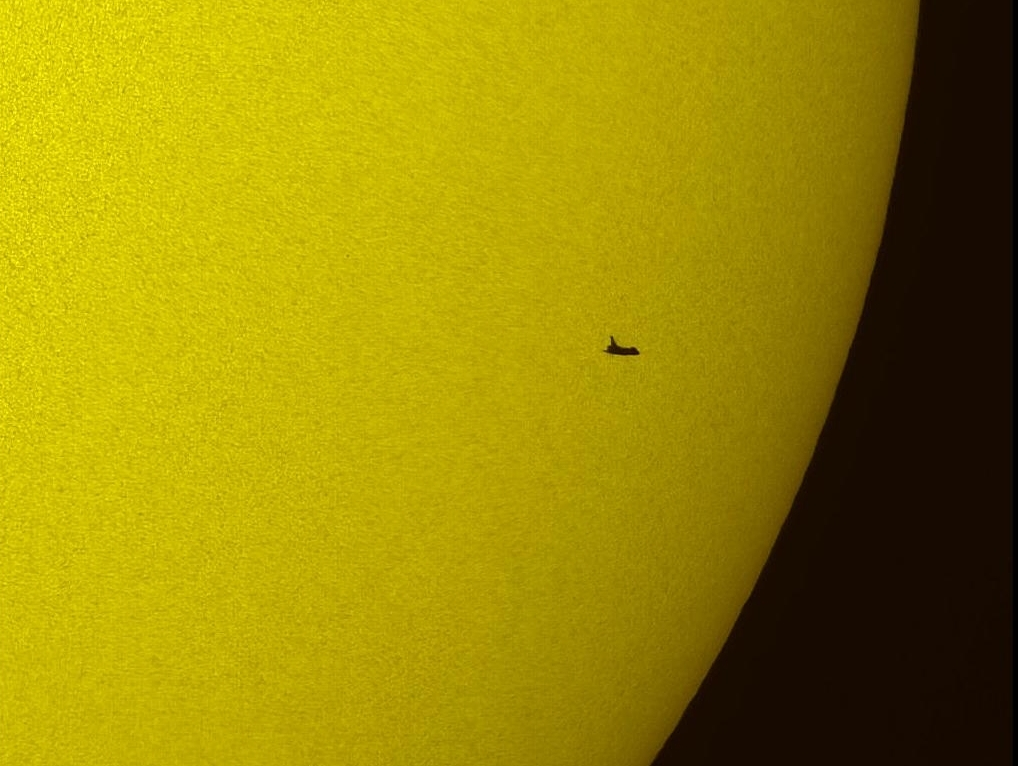
An image of the Space Shuttle Atlantis as it transits the Sun

In astronomy, a solar transit is a movement of any object passing between the Sun and the Earth. This includes the planets Mercury and Venus (see Transit of Mercury and Transit of Venus). A solar eclipse is also a solar transit of the Moon, but technically only if it does not cover the entire disc of the Sun (an annular eclipse), as "transit" counts only objects that are smaller than what they are passing in front of. Solar transit is only one of several types of astronomical transit

A solar transit (also called a solar outage, sometimes solar fade, sun outage, or sun fade) also occurs to communications satellites, which pass in front of the Sun for several minutes each day for several days straight for a period in the months around the equinoxes, the exact dates depending on where the satellite is in the sky relative to its earth station. Because the Sun also produces a great deal of microwave radiation in addition to sunlight, it overwhelms the microwave radio signals coming from the satellite's transponders. This enormous electromagnetic interference causes interruptions in fixed satellite services that use satellite dishes, including TV networks and radio networks, as well as VSAT and DBS.

Only downlinks from the satellite are affected, uplinks from the Earth are normally not, as the planet "shades" the Earth station when viewed from the satellite. Satellites in geosynchronous orbit are irregularly affected based on their inclination. Reception from satellites in other orbits are frequently but only momentarily affected by this, and by their nature the same signal is usually repeated or relayed on another satellite, if a tracking dish is used at all. Satellite radio and other services like GPS are not affected, as they use no receiving dish, and therefore do not concentrate the interference. (GPS and certain satellite radio systems use non-geosynchronous satellites.)

Solar transit begins with only a brief degradation in signal quality for a few moments. At the same time each day, for the next several days, it gets longer and gets worse, until finally gradually improving after several more days. For digital satellite services, the cliff effect will eliminate reception entirely at a given threshold. Reception is typically lost for only a few minutes on the worst day, but the beam width of the dish can affect this. Signal strength also affects this, as does the bandwidth of the signal. If the power is concentrated into a narrower band, there is a higher signal-to-noise ratio. If the same signal is spread wider, the receiver also gets a wider swath of noise, degrading reception.

The exact days and times of solar transit outages, for each satellite and for each receiving point (Earth station) on the Earth, are available at various websites. For broadcast networks, the network feed must be pre-recorded, replaced with local programming, fed via another satellite in a different orbital position, or fed via another method entirely during these times.

In the Northern Hemisphere, solar transit is usually in early March and October. In the Southern Hemisphere, solar transit is usually in early September and April. The time of day varies mainly with the longitude of the satellite and receiving station, while the exact days vary mainly with the station's latitude. Stations along the equator will experience solar transit right at the equinoxes, as that is where geostationary satellites are located directly over.

== See also ==
- Sun outage
- Transit of Mercury
- Transit of Venus
