= 4DTV =

Type of broadcasting standard

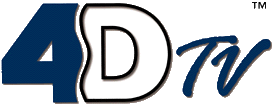

4DTV is a proprietary television broadcasting standard and technology for digital cable broadcasting and satellite television from Motorola, using General Instrument's DigiCipher II for encryption. It was designed to use both analog VideoCipher II and digital DCII channels.

== History ==
4DTV technology was originally developed in 1997 (the same year that DigiCipher was developed) by General Instrument/NextLevel and Motorola, now a division of ARRIS. The 4DTV format is contemporary to the DVB-based digital television broadcast standard but its completion came before that of DVB and thus it is incompatible.

On December 31, 2010, Motorola abandoned support for 4DTV after 13 years when it was developed.

On August 24, 2016, at 9:18 a.m. EST, Headend In The Sky (the primary provider for 4DTV/DigiCipher II programming) transitioned to DVB-S2 (MPEG-2/256 QAM), meaning that support for 4DTV on TVRO systems ended on that date. Shaw Direct ended 4DTV DBS service one year later as part of the transition to full HD, effectively ending the 4DTV era.

== Usage ==
4DTV is designed for C-band/Ku-band satellite dishes (both TVRO/direct-broadcast) in conjunction with the DigiCipher II system (for digital SD and HD signals) and the VideoCipher II system (for analog signals). It was also used on Canada's Shaw Direct (previously known as Star Choice) until the transition to full HD. Standard DigiCipher II continues to be used on Shaw Direct to this day.

=== Receiver/Decoders ===
4DTV receivers were designed to receive analog NTSC (except the DSR-905) in the clear or VideoCipher and DigiCipher encrypted channels and feeds as a TVRO satellite system on both C and Ku band satellite dishes.

Four models were produced, all of which have been discontinued:

- DSR-920 (discontinued as of 2003)
- DSR-921 (discontinued as of 2003)
- DSR-922 (made available in Fall 2000, discontinued)
- DSR-905 (DigiCipher II only, discontinued)

=== High definition access ===
The HDD-200 is a peripheral for 4DTV receivers, it is used to access high definition channels via the Multi-Media Access Port. This peripheral is no longer in production.

=== Programming providers ===
In the United States, National Programming Service, LLC (NPS) was the primary provider of subscription programming to 4DTV C band/K_{u} band TVRO consumers. They ceased operations as of December 26, 2010 after making a failed attempt of converting all of their customers over to Dish Network.

=== Advantages ===
4DTV TVRO providers made use of first-generation digital master feeds on several satellites and hundreds of channels. Therefore, a high quality signal was received, compared to other programming options that are typically compressed and re-uplinked. When used with a C-band system, 4DTV had the advantage of signal stability, great satellite footprint and no rain fade. This is a problem with services such as Dish Network and DirecTV satellite providers since they re-uplink on Ku and Ka bands.

=== Disadvantages ===
The master feeds for the many channels available were often scattered amongst multiple satellites. The actuator has to slowly rotate a large dish into the desired satellite's signal path, and then a further short delay for signal acquisition and lock. This made rapid "channel surfing" impossible outside channels on one satellite.
