= Ingenius =

Ingenius can refer to the following:

- Ingenius, the mythical British king.
- InGenius, a now-defunct newsfeed service for personal computers, previously known as X*Press X*Change.
