= T5 (satellite) =

Dormant communication satellite

Coordinates: 0°N 109.8°W

- Mission type: Communications
- Operator: DirecTV
- COSPAR ID: 2002-023A
- SATCAT no.: 27426
- Mission duration: Elapsed: 24 years, 5 months, 26 days

Spacecraft properties
- Bus: LS-1300
- Manufacturer: Space Systems/Loral

Start of mission
- Launch date: May 7, 2002, 17:00:00 UTC
- Rocket: Proton-K/DM3
- Launch site: Baikonur 81/24
- Contractor: International Launch Services

Orbital parameters
- Reference system: Geocentric
- Regime: Geostationary
- Longitude: 109.8° West
- Perigee altitude: 35,780 kilometres (22,230 mi)
- Apogee altitude: 35,805 kilometres (22,248 mi)
- Inclination: 0.01 degrees
- Period: 1436.010 minutes
- Epoch: 24 January 2015, 08:51:48 UTC

T5 (formerly DirecTV-5) is a dormant communications satellite launched from Baikonur Cosmodrome, Kazakhstan in May, 2002 to provide mainly Spanish language satellite television programs to DirecTV customers from the 119 degrees West longitudinal orbit. It was built by Space Systems/Loral, as part of its LS-1300 line. In May 2004, DIRECTV successfully launched DIRECTV 7S (later T7S), their second high powered spot beam. T7S is located at the 119 degree orbital slot. The satellite was renamed to T5 in 2017.

T5 was originally known as Tempo 1, and was originally intended for satellite provider ASkyB, who later sold the satellites to PrimeStar in the process of going out of business. PrimeStar's other satellite, Tempo 2 (later DirecTV-6) was launched in 1997, while Tempo 1 was stored until the company and both satellites were purchased by DirecTV. DirecTV eventually launched the Tempo 1 satellite after years of delays as the DirecTV-5 satellite in 2002. In 2015, the satellite was renamed to T5, after AT&T purchased DirecTV and took over operations of the satellite fleet.

T5 is located at 109.8°W and provided MPEG-2 high definition channels to the continental U.S. from sometime in 2003 or 2004 to March 2010 and MPEG-2 standard definition channels for the Puerto Rico market from December 17, 2012 to or around December 7, 2018. Due to DirecTV’s decision to remove the 110° position from its fleet, T5 stopped broadcasting all of its channels on or around December 7, 2018 and is currently dormant. Despite this, the satellite remains in geostationary orbit.

== See also ==
- DirecTV satellite fleet
