= Satellite television =

Broadcasting of television using artificial satellites

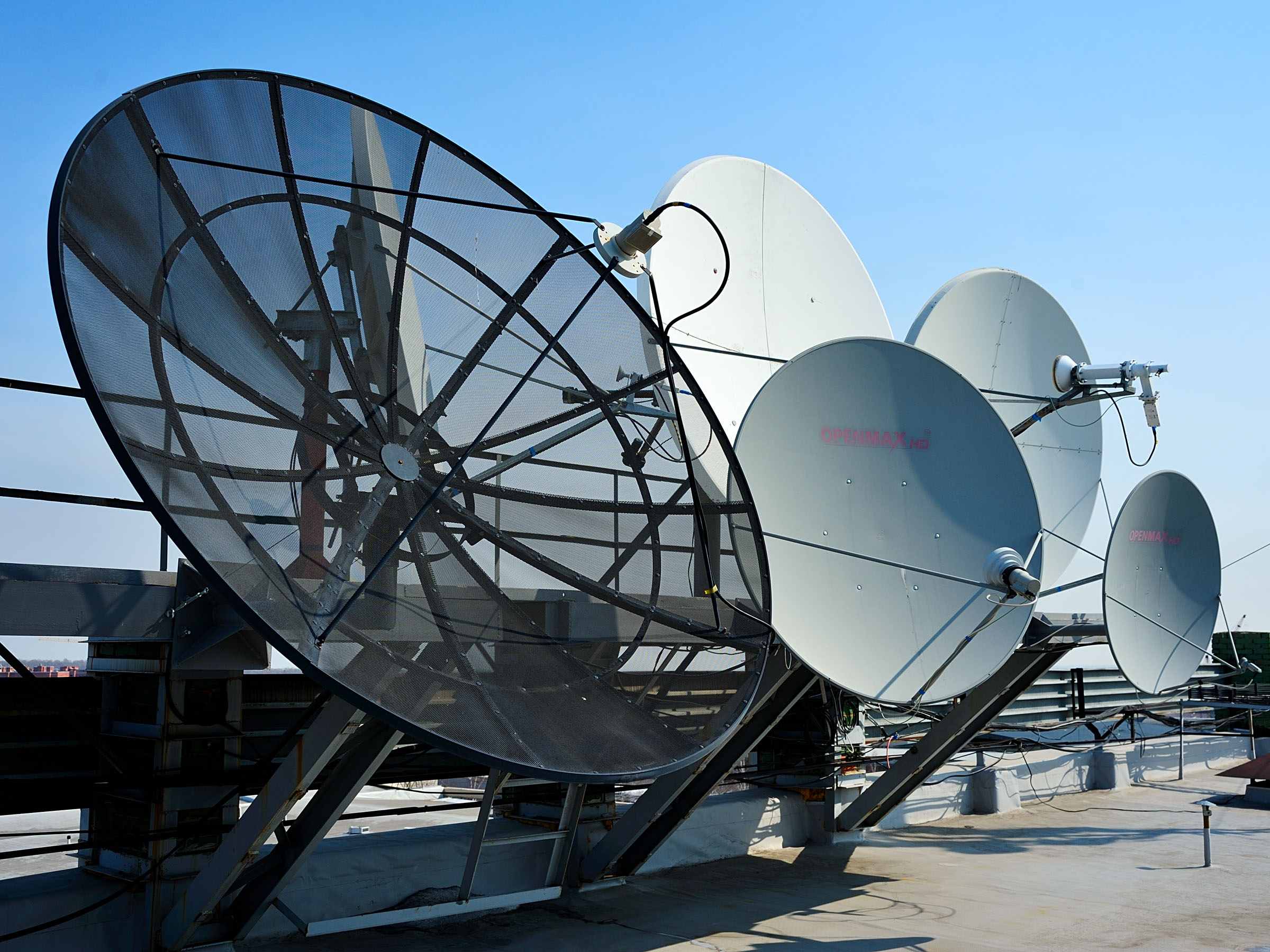
A number of satellite dishes

Satellite television is a service that delivers television programming to viewers by relaying it from a communications satellite orbiting the Earth directly to the viewer's location. The signals are received via an outdoor parabolic antenna commonly referred to as a satellite dish and a low-noise block downconverter.

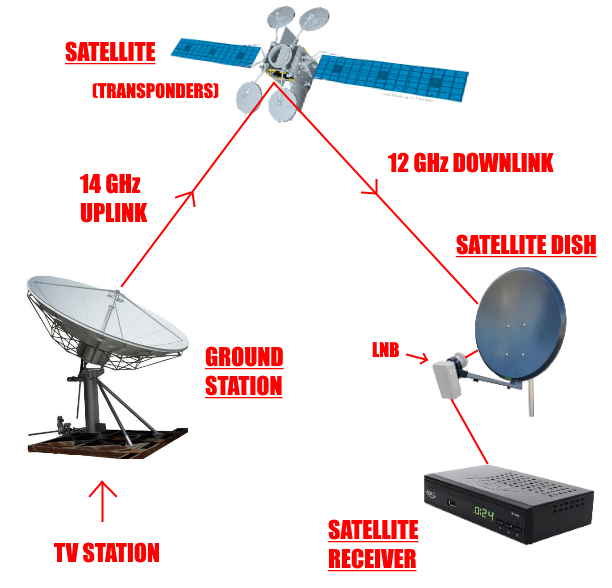
Diagram showing how modern satellite television works

A satellite receiver decodes the desired television program for viewing on a television set. Receivers can be external set-top boxes, or a built-in television tuner. Satellite television provides a wide range of channels and services. It is usually the only television available in many remote geographic areas without terrestrial television or cable television service. Different receivers are required for the two types. Some transmissions and channels are unencrypted and therefore free-to-air, while many other channels are transmitted with encryption. Free-to-view channels are encrypted but not charged-for, while pay television requires the viewer to subscribe and pay a monthly fee to receive the programming.

Modern systems signals are relayed from a communications satellite on the X band (8–12 GHz) or K_{u} band (12–18 GHz) frequencies, requiring only a small dish less than a meter in diameter. The first satellite TV systems were a now-obsolete type known as television receive-only. These systems received weaker analog signals transmitted in the C-band (4–8 GHz) from FSS type satellites, requiring the use of large 2–3-meter dishes. Consequently, these systems were nicknamed "big dish" systems, and were more expensive and less popular. Early systems used analog signals, but modern ones use digital signals, which allow transmission of the modern television standard high-definition television, due to the significantly improved spectral efficiency of digital broadcasting. Star One D2 from Brazil was the last satellite to broadcast in analog signals until 2025, when TV Verdade stopped analog satellite TV broadcasts on August 25, 2025.

== Technology ==
The satellites used for broadcasting television are usually in a geostationary orbit 36,000 km (22,000 mi) above the earth's equator. The advantage of this orbit is that the satellite's orbital period equals the rotation rate of the Earth, so the satellite appears at a fixed position in the sky. Thus the satellite dish antenna which receives the signal can be aimed permanently at the location of the satellite and does not have to track a moving satellite. A few systems instead use a highly elliptical orbit with inclination of +/−63.4 degrees and an orbital period of about twelve hours, known as a Molniya orbit.

Satellite television, like other communications relayed by satellite, starts with a transmitting antenna located at an uplink facility. Uplink satellite dishes are very large, as much as 9 to 12 meters (30 to 39 feet) in diameter. The increased diameter results in more accurate aiming and increased signal strength at the satellite. The uplink dish is pointed toward a specific satellite and the uplinked signals are transmitted within a specific frequency range, so as to be received by one of the transponders tuned to that frequency range aboard that satellite. The transponder re-transmits the signals back to Earth at a different frequency (a process known as translation, used to avoid interference with the uplink signal), typically in the 10.7–12.7 GHz band, but some still transmit in the C-band (4–8 GHz), K_{u}-band (12–18 GHz), or both. The leg of the signal path from the satellite to the receiving Earth station is called the downlink.

A typical satellite has up to 32 K_{u}-band or 24 C-band transponders, or more for K_{u}/C hybrid satellites. Typical transponders each have a bandwidth between 27 and 50 MHz. Each geostationary C-band satellite needs to be spaced 2° in longitude from the next satellite to avoid interference; for K_{u} the spacing can be 1°. This means that there is an upper limit of 360/2 = 180 geostationary C-band satellites or 360/1 = 360 geostationary K_{u}-band satellites. C-band transmission is susceptible to terrestrial interference while K_{u}-band transmission is affected by rain (as water is an excellent absorber of microwaves at this particular frequency). The latter is even more adversely affected by ice crystals in thunder clouds. On occasion, sun outage will occur when the sun lines up directly behind the geostationary satellite to which the receiving antenna is pointed.

The downlink satellite signal, quite weak after traveling the great distance (see path loss), is collected with a parabolic receiving dish, which reflects the weak signal to the dish's focal point. Mounted on brackets at the dish's focal point is a device called a feedhorn or collector. The feedhorn is a section of waveguide with a flared front-end that gathers the signals at or near the focal point and conducts them to a probe or pickup connected to a low-noise block downconverter (LNB). The LNB amplifies the signals and downconverts them to a lower block of intermediate frequencies (IF), usually in the L-band.

The original C-band satellite television systems used a low-noise amplifier (LNA) connected to the feedhorn at the focal point of the dish. The amplified signal, still at the higher microwave frequencies, had to be fed via very expensive low-loss 50-ohm impedance gas filled hardline coaxial cable with relatively complex N-connectors to an indoor receiver or, in other designs, a downconverter (a mixer and a voltage-controlled oscillator with some filter circuitry) for downconversion to an intermediate frequency. The channel selection was controlled typically by a voltage-controlled oscillator with the tuning voltage being fed via a separate cable to the headend, but this design evolved.

Designs for microstrip-based converters for amateur radio frequencies were adapted for the 4 GHz C-band. Central to these designs was the concept of a block downconversion of a range of frequencies to a lower, more easily handled IF.

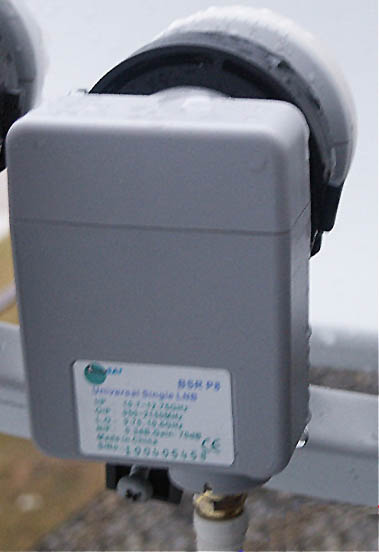
Back view of a linear polarised LNB

The advantages of using an LNB are that cheaper cable can be used to connect the indoor receiver to the satellite television dish and LNB, and that the technology for handling the signal at L-band and UHF was far cheaper than that for handling the signal at C-band frequencies. The shift to cheaper technology from the hardline and N-connectors of the early C-band systems to the cheaper and simpler 75-ohm cable and F-connectors allowed the early satellite television receivers to use, what were in reality, modified UHF television tuners which selected the satellite television channel for down conversion to a lower intermediate frequency centered on 70 MHz, where it was demodulated. This shift allowed the satellite television DTH industry to change from being a largely hobbyist one where only small numbers of systems costing thousands of US dollars were built, to a far more commercial one of mass production.

In the United States, service providers use the intermediate frequency ranges of 950–2150 MHz to carry the signal from the LNBF at the dish down to the receiver. This allows for the transmission of UHF signals along the same span of coaxial wire at the same time. In some applications (DirecTV AU9-S and AT-9), ranges of the lower B-band and 2250–3000 MHz, are used. Newer LNBFs in use by DirecTV, called SWM (Single Wire Multiswitch), are used to implement single cable distribution and use a wider frequency range of 2–2150 MHz.

The satellite receiver or set-top box demodulates and converts the signals to the desired form (outputs for television, audio, data, etc.). Often, the receiver includes the capability to selectively unscramble or decrypt the received signal to provide premium services to some subscribers; the receiver is then called an integrated receiver/decoder or IRD. Low-loss cable (e.g. RG-6, RG-11, etc.) is used to connect the receiver to the LNBF or LNB. RG-59 is not recommended for this application as it is not technically designed to carry frequencies above 950 MHz, but may work in some circumstances, depending on the quality of the coaxial wire, signal levels, cable length, etc.

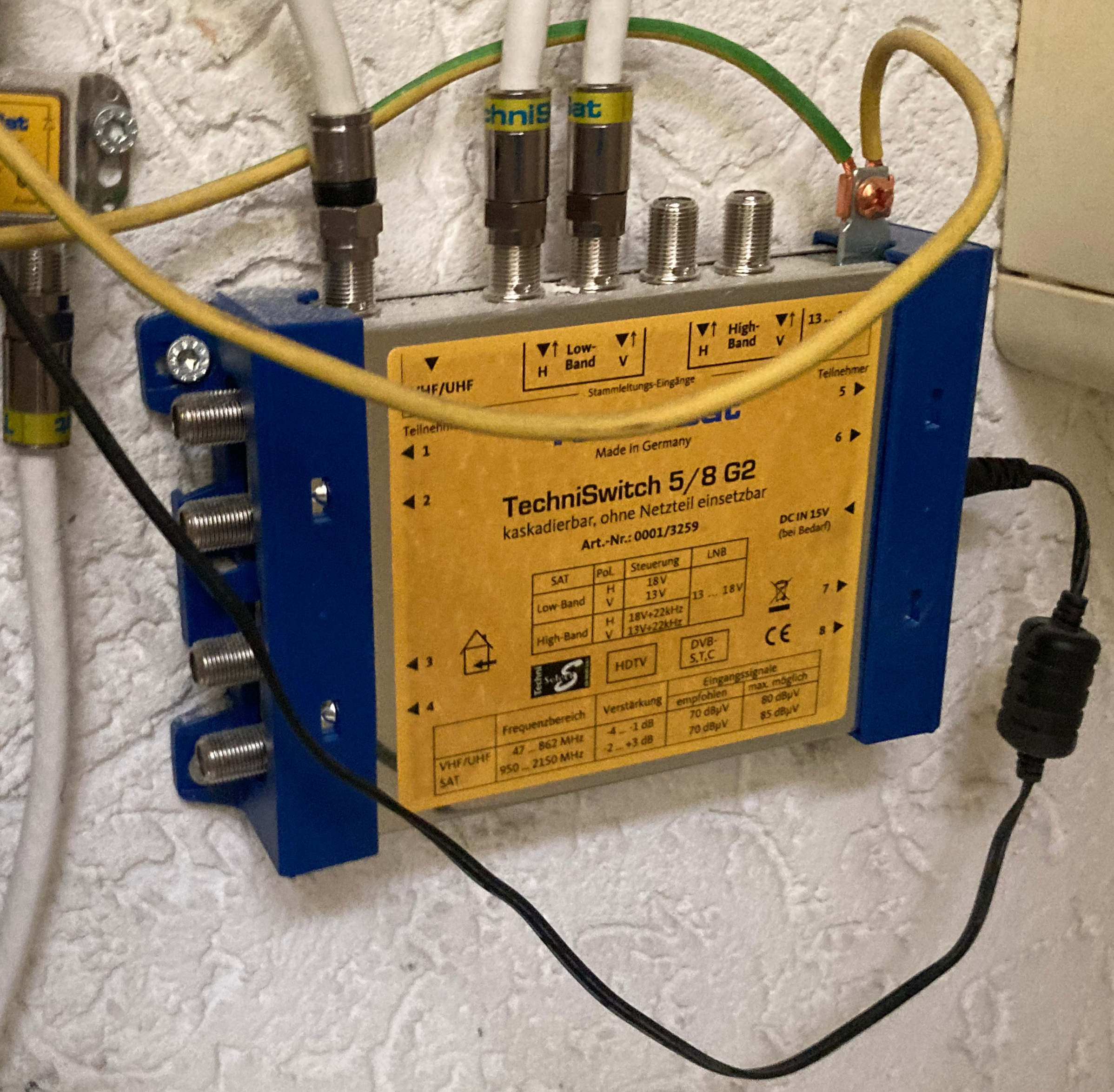
A multiswitch made by TechniSat

A practical problem relating to home satellite reception is that an LNB can basically only handle a single receiver. This is because the LNB is translating two different circular polarizations (right-hand and left-hand) and, in the case of K-band, two different frequency bands (lower and upper) to the same frequency range on the cable. Depending on which frequency and polarization a transponder is using, the satellite receiver has to switch the LNB into one of four different modes in order to receive a specific "channel". This is handled by the receiver using the DiSEqC protocol to control the LNB mode. If several satellite receivers are to be attached to a single dish, a so-called multiswitch will have to be used in conjunction with a special type of LNB. There are also LNBs available with a multi-switch already integrated. This problem becomes more complicated when several receivers are to use several dishes (or several LNBs mounted in a single dish) pointing to different satellites.

A common solution for consumers wanting to access multiple satellites is to deploy a single dish with a single LNB and to rotate the dish using an electric motor. The axis of rotation has to be set up in the north–south direction and, depending on the geographical location of the dish, have a specific vertical tilt. Set up properly the motorized dish when turned will sweep across all possible positions for satellites lined up along the geostationary orbit directly above the equator. The dish will then be capable of receiving any geostationary satellite that is visible at the specific location, i.e. that is above the horizon. The DiSEqC protocol has been extended to encompass commands for steering dish rotors.

There are five major components in a satellite system: the programming source, the broadcast center, the satellite, the satellite dish, and the receiver. "Direct broadcast" satellites used for transmission of satellite television signals are generally in geostationary orbit 37,000 km (23,000 mi) above the earth's equator. The reason for using this orbit is that the satellite circles the Earth at the same rate as the Earth rotates, so the satellite appears at a fixed point in the sky. Thus satellite dishes can be aimed permanently at that point, and do not need a tracking system to turn to follow a moving satellite. A few satellite TV systems use satellites in a Molniya orbit, a highly elliptical orbit with inclination of +/-63.4 degrees and an orbital period of about twelve hours.

Satellite television, like other communications relayed by satellite, starts with a transmitting antenna located at an uplink facility. Uplink facilities transmit the signal to the satellite over a narrow beam of microwaves, typically in the C-band frequency range due to its resistance to rain fade. Uplink satellite dishes are very large, often as much as 9 to 12 metres (30 to 39 ft) in diameter to achieve accurate aiming and increased signal strength at the satellite, to improve reliability. The uplink dish is pointed toward a specific satellite and the uplinked signals are transmitted within a specific frequency range, so as to be received by one of the transponders tuned to that frequency range aboard that satellite. The transponder then converts the signals to K_{u} band, a process known as "translation," and transmits them back to earth to be received by home satellite stations.

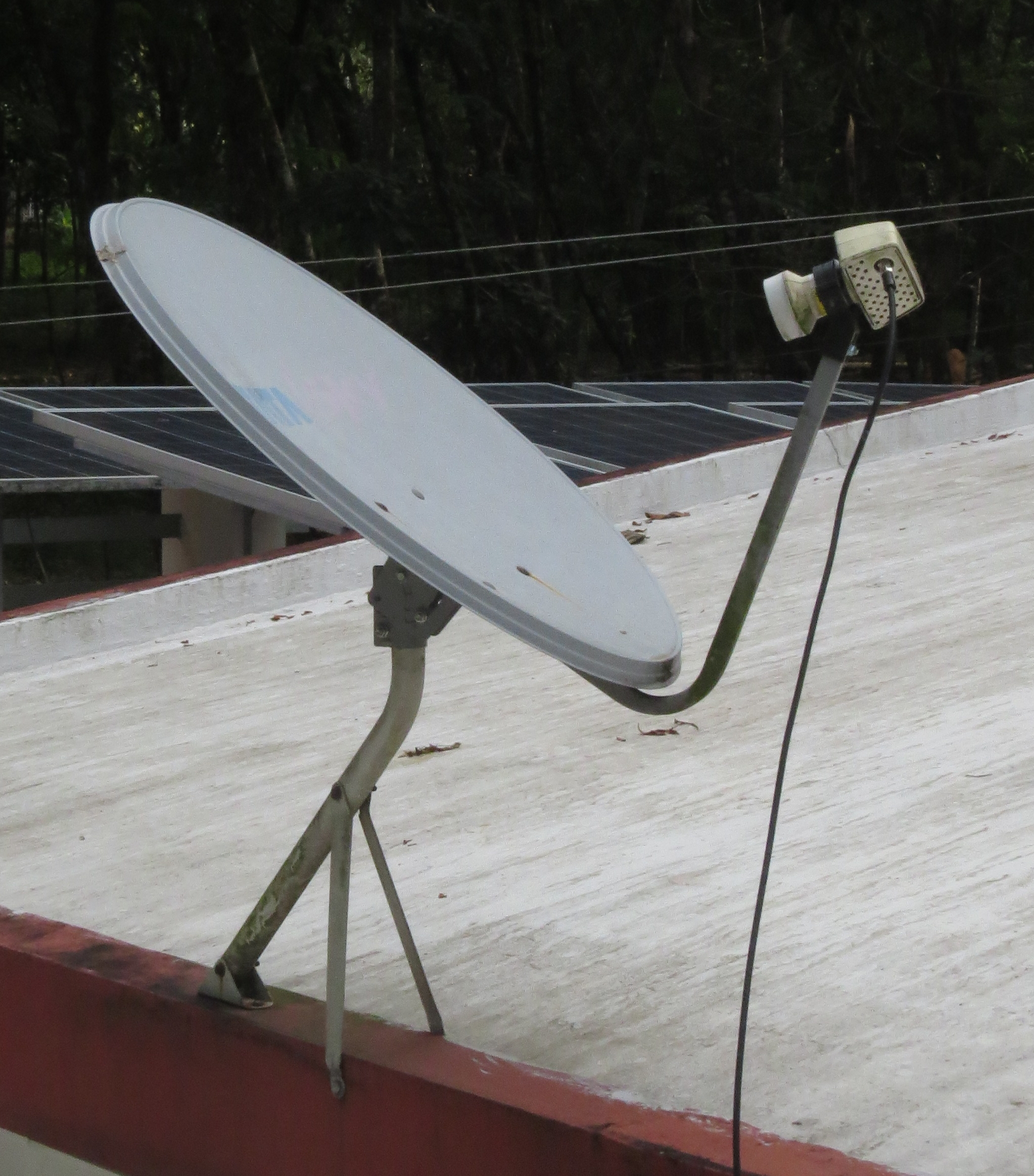
A DTH Satellite dish from India

The downlinked satellite signal, weaker after traveling the great distance (see path loss), is collected by using a rooftop parabolic receiving dish ("satellite dish"), which reflects the weak signal to the dish's focal point. Mounted on brackets at the dish's focal point is a feedhorn which passes the signals through a waveguide to a device called a low-noise block converter (LNB) or low noise converter (LNC) attached to the horn. The LNB amplifies the weak signals, filters the block of frequencies in which the satellite television signals are transmitted, and converts the block of frequencies to a lower frequency range in the L-band range. The signal is then passed through a coaxial cable into the residence to the satellite television receiver, a set-top box next to the television.

The reason for using the LNB to do the frequency translation at the dish is so that the signal can be carried into the residence using cheap coaxial cable. To transport the signal into the house at its original K_{u} band microwave frequency would require an expensive waveguide, a metal pipe to carry the radio waves. The cable connecting the receiver to the LNB are of the low loss type RG-6, quad shield RG-6, or RG-11. RG-59 is not recommended for this application as it is not technically designed to carry frequencies above 950 MHz, but will work in many circumstances, depending on the quality of the coaxial wire. The shift to more affordable technology from the 50 ohm impedance cable and N-connectors of the early C-band systems to the cheaper 75 ohm technology and F-connectors allowed the early satellite television receivers to use, what were in reality, modified UHF television tuners which selected the satellite television channel for down conversion to another lower intermediate frequency centered on 70 MHz where it was demodulated.

An LNB can only handle a single receiver. This is due to the fact that the LNB is mapping two different circular polarisations – right hand and left hand – and in the case of the K_{u}-band two different reception bands – lower and upper – to one and the same frequency band on the cable, and is a practical problem for home satellite reception. Depending on which frequency a transponder is transmitting at and on what polarisation it is using, the satellite receiver has to switch the LNB into one of four different modes in order to receive a specific desired program on a specific transponder. The receiver uses the DiSEqC protocol to control the LNB mode, which handles this. If several satellite receivers are to be attached to a single dish a so-called multiswitch must be used in conjunction with a special type of LNB. There are also LNBs available with a multi-switch already integrated. This problem becomes more complicated when several receivers use several dishes or several LNBs mounted in a single dish are aimed at different satellites.

The set-top box selects the channel desired by the user by filtering that channel from the multiple channels received from the satellite, converts the signal to a lower intermediate frequency, decrypts the encrypted signal, demodulates the radio signal and sends the resulting video signal to the television through a cable. To decrypt the signal the receiver box must be "activated" by the satellite company. If the customer fails to pay their monthly bill the box is "deactivated" by a signal from the company, and the system will not work until the company reactivates it. Some receivers are capable of decrypting the received signal itself. These receivers are called integrated receiver/decoders or IRDs.

Analog television which was distributed via satellite was usually sent scrambled or unscrambled in NTSC, PAL, or SECAM television broadcast standards. The analog signal is frequency modulated and is converted from an FM signal to what is referred to as baseband. This baseband comprises the video signal and the audio subcarrier(s). The audio subcarrier is further demodulated to provide a raw audio signal.

Later signals were digitized television signals or multiplex of signals, typically QPSK. In general, digital television, including that transmitted via satellites, is based on open standards such as MPEG and DVB-S/DVB-S2 or ISDB-S.

The conditional access encryption/scrambling methods include NDS, BISS, Conax, Digicipher, Irdeto, Cryptoworks, DG Crypt, Beta digital, SECA Mediaguard, Logiways, Nagravision, PowerVu, Viaccess, Videocipher, and VideoGuard. Many conditional access systems have been compromised.

=== Sun outage ===
An event called sun outage occurs when the sun lines up directly behind the satellite in the field of view of the receiving satellite dish. This happens for about a 10-minute period daily around midday, twice every year for a two-week period in the spring and fall around the equinox. During this period, the sun is within the main lobe of the dish's reception pattern, so the strong microwave noise emitted by the sun on the same frequencies used by the satellite's transponders drowns out reception.

== Uses ==
=== Direct-to-home and direct broadcast satellite ===
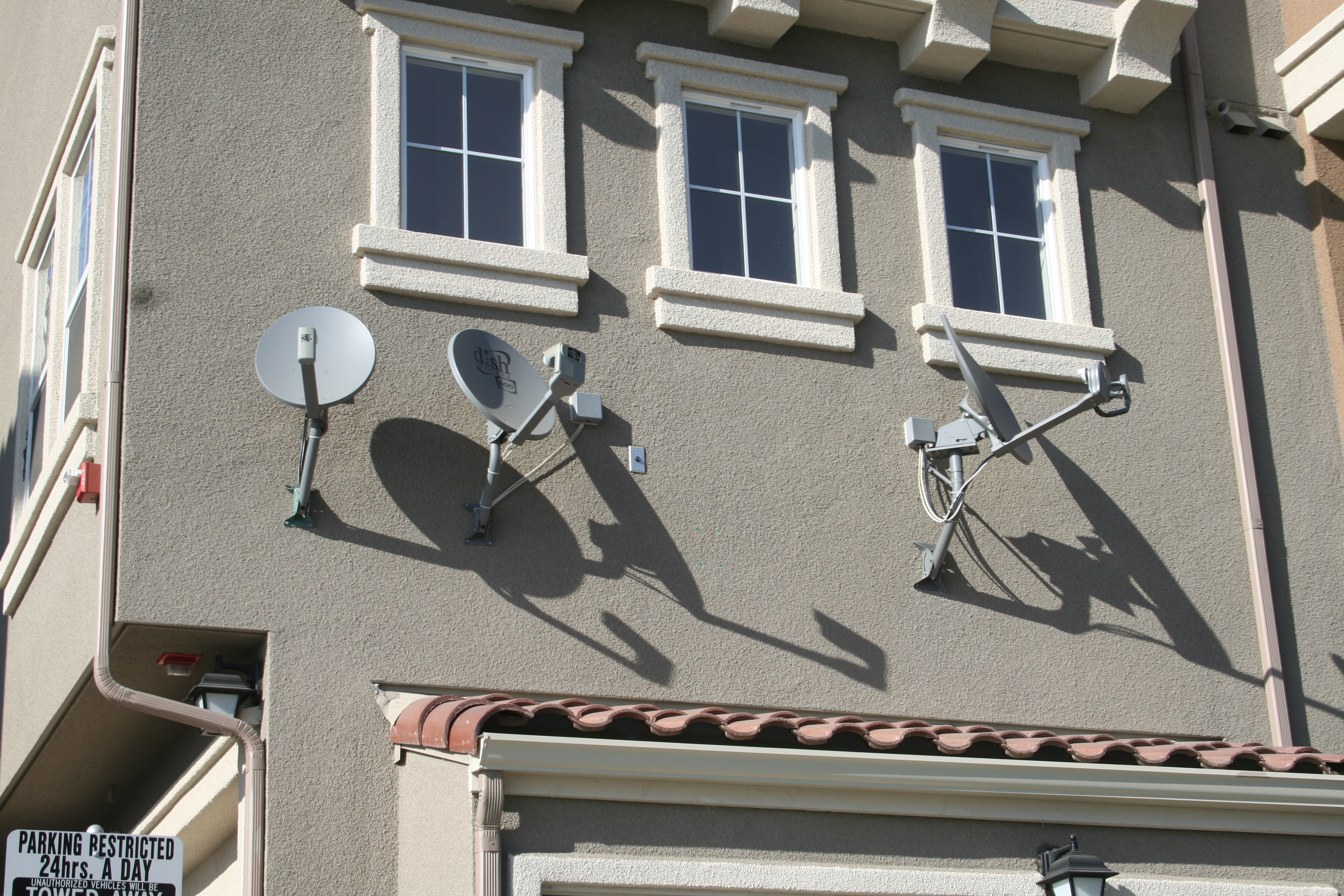
DBS satellite dishes installed on an apartment complex in San Jose, CA (2006)

Direct-to-home (DTH) can either refer to the communications satellites themselves that deliver service or the actual television service. Most satellite television customers in developed television markets get their programming through a direct broadcast satellite (DBS) provider. Signals are transmitted using K_{u} band (12 to 18 GHz) and are completely digital which allows for higher picture and sound quality.

Programming for satellite television channels comes from multiple sources and may include live studio feeds. The broadcast center assembles and packages programming into channels for transmission and, where necessary, encrypts the channels. The signal is then sent to the uplink where it is transmitted to the satellite. With some broadcast centers, the studios, administration and up-link are all part of the same campus. The satellite then translates and broadcasts the channels.

Most systems use the DVB-S standard for transmission. With pay television services, the data stream is encrypted and requires proprietary reception equipment. While the underlying reception technology is similar, the pay television technology is proprietary, often consisting of a conditional-access module and smart card. This measure assures satellite television providers that only authorized, paying subscribers have access to pay television content but at the same time can allow free-to-air channels to be viewed even by the people with standard equipment available in the market.

Some countries operate satellite television services which can be received for free, without paying a subscription fee. This is called free-to-air satellite television. Germany is likely the leader in free-to-air with approximately 250 digital channels (including 83 HDTV channels and various regional channels) broadcast from the Astra 19.2°E satellite constellation. These are not marketed as a DBS service, but are received in approximately 18 million homes, as well as in any home using the Sky Deutschland commercial DBS system. All German analogue satellite broadcasts ceased on 30 April 2012.

The United Kingdom has approximately 160 digital channels (including the regional variations of BBC channels, ITV channels, Channel 4 and Channel 5) that are broadcast without encryption from the Astra 28.2°E satellite constellation, and receivable on any DVB-S receiver (a DVB-S2 receiver is required for certain high definition television services). Most of these channels are included within the Sky EPG, and an increasing number within the Freesat EPG.

India's national broadcaster, Doordarshan, promotes a free-to-air DBS package as "DD Free Dish", which is provided as in-fill for the country's terrestrial transmission network. It is broadcast from GSAT-15 at 93.5°E and contains about 80 FTA channels.

While originally launched as backhaul for their digital terrestrial television service, a large number of French channels are free-to-air on satellites at 5°W, and have recently been announced as being official in-fill for the DTT network.

In North America (United States, Canada and Mexico) there are over 80 FTA digital channels available on Galaxy 19 (with the majority being ethnic or religious in nature). Other FTA satellites include AMC-4, AMC-6, Galaxy 18, and Satmex 5. A company called GloryStar promotes FTA religious broadcasters on Galaxy 19.

Satellite TV has seen a decline in consumers since the 2010s due to the cord-cutting trend where people are shifting towards internet-based streaming television and free over-the-air television.

=== Television receive-only ===
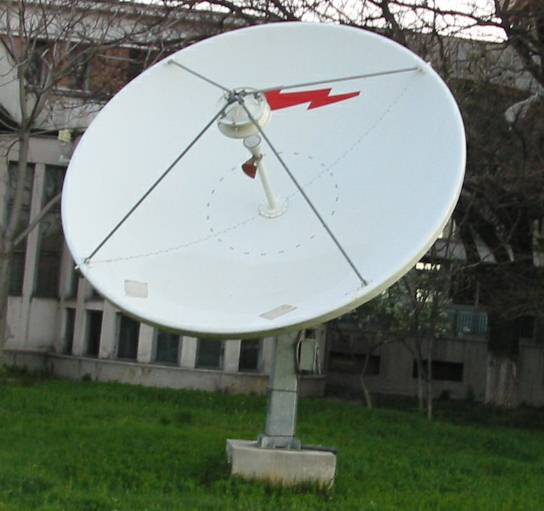
A C-band Andrew Corporation satellite dish used by TVRO systems

The term television receive-only, or TVRO, arose during the early days of satellite television reception to differentiate it from commercial satellite television uplink and downlink operations (transmit and receive). This was the primary method of satellite television transmissions before the satellite television industry shifted, with the launch of higher powered DBS satellites in the early 1990s which transmitted their signals on the K_{u} band frequencies. Satellite television channels at that time were intended to be used by cable television networks rather than received by home viewers. Early satellite television receiver systems were largely constructed by hobbyists and engineers. These early TVRO systems operated mainly on the C-band frequencies and the dishes required were large; typically over 3 meters (9.8 ft) in diameter. Consequently, TVRO is often referred to as "big dish" or "Big Ugly Dish" (BUD) satellite television.

TVRO systems were designed to receive analog and digital satellite feeds of both television or audio from both C-band and K_{u}-band transponders on FSS-type satellites. The higher frequency K_{u}-band systems tend to resemble DBS systems and can use a smaller dish antenna because of the higher power transmissions and greater antenna gain. TVRO systems tend to use larger rather than smaller satellite dish antennas, since it is more likely that the owner of a TVRO system would have a C-band-only setup rather than a K_{u} band-only setup. Additional receiver boxes allow for different types of digital satellite signal reception, such as DVB/MPEG-2 and 4DTV.

The narrow beam width of a normal parabolic satellite antenna means it can only receive signals from a single satellite at a time. Simulsat or the Vertex-RSI TORUS, is a quasi-parabolic satellite earthstation antenna that is capable of receiving satellite transmissions from 35 or more C- and K_{u}-band satellites simultaneously.

== History ==
=== Early history ===
In 1945 British science fiction writer Arthur C. Clarke proposed a worldwide communications system which would function by means of three satellites equally spaced apart in Earth orbit. This was published in the October 1945 issue of the Wireless World magazine and won him the Franklin Institute's Stuart Ballantine Medal in 1963.

The first satellite relayed communication was achieved early on in the space age, after the first relay test was conducted by Pioneer 1 and the first radio broadcast by SCORE at the end of 1958, after at the beginning of the year Sputnik I became the first satellite in history.

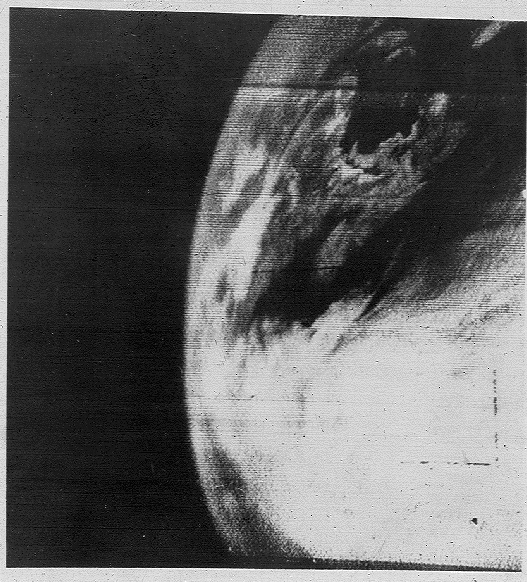
In 1960 TIROS 1 sent back the first televised image of Earth from space, becoming the first weather satellite.

=== First satellite relayed broadcasts ===
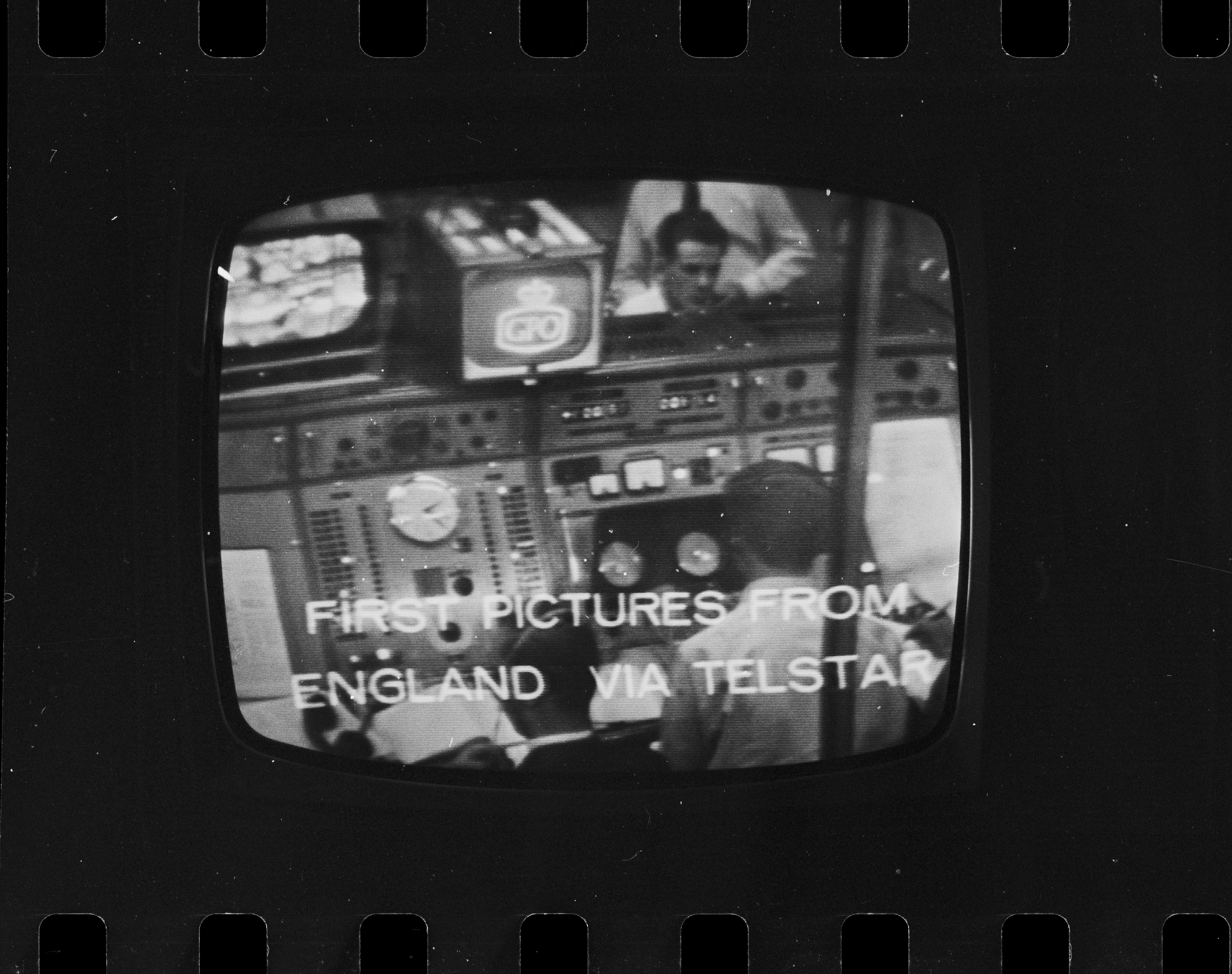
AT&T Telstar 1 test (first satellite TV broadcast, July 11, 1962)

The first public satellite television signals from Europe to North America were relayed via the Telstar satellite over the Atlantic ocean on 23 July 1962, although a test broadcast had taken place almost two weeks earlier on 11 July. The signals were received and broadcast in North American and European countries and watched by over 100 million. Launched in 1962, the Relay 1 satellite was the first satellite to transmit television signals from the US to Japan. The first geosynchronous communication satellite, Syncom 2, was launched on 26 July 1963. The subsequent first geostationary Syncom 3, orbiting near the International Date Line, was used to telecast the 1964 Olympic Games from Tokyo to the United States.

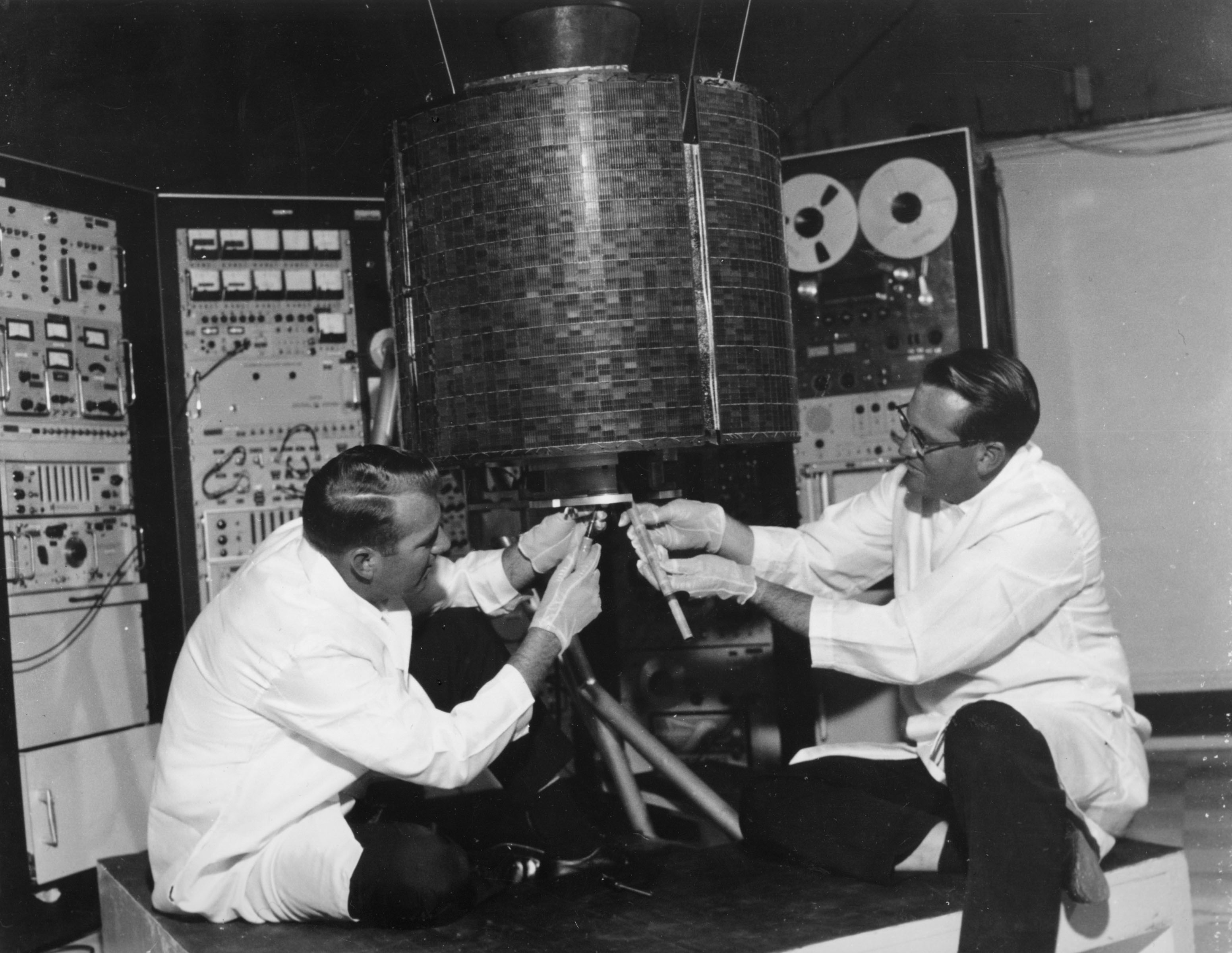
Intelsat I (1965), the world's first commercial communications satellite, was used among others to relay the Our World multi-national broadcast (1967), the first multi-satellite relayed television broadcast.

The world's first commercial communications satellite, called Intelsat I and nicknamed "Early Bird", was launched into geosynchronous orbit on April 6, 1965. The first national network of television satellites, called Orbita, was created by the Soviet Union in October 1967, and was based on the principle of using the highly elliptical Molniya satellite for rebroadcasting and delivering of television signals to ground downlink stations.

Clip of the international broadcast of the first Moon landing, Neil Armstrong making humanity's first step onto an extraterrestrial body, transmitted from Honeysuckle Creek Tracking Station and distributed globally via the Intelsat III F-4 satellite

=== Development of the direct satellite TV industry ===
The first domestic satellite to carry television transmissions was Canada's geostationary Anik 1, which was launched on 9 November 1972.

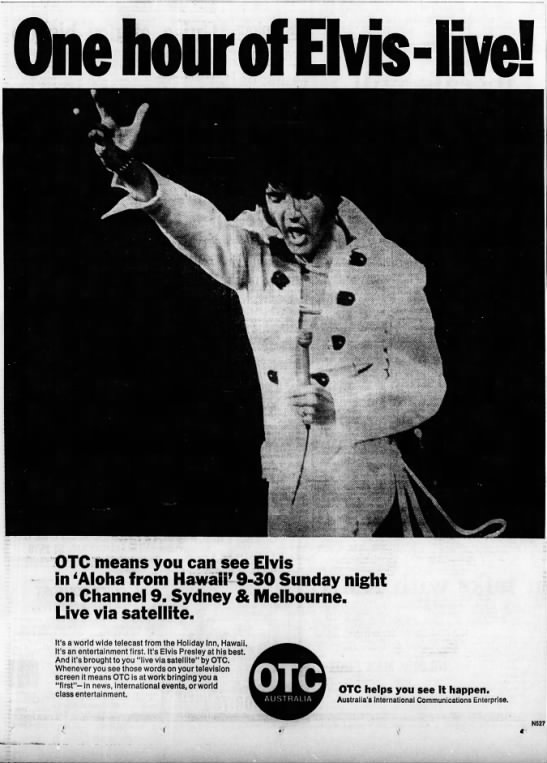
An advertisement by the Australian Overseas Telecommunications Commission (OTC) for the Aloha from Hawaii via Satellite, broadcast via the Intelsat IV F-4 satellite, an early international broadcast event featuring Elvis Presley live in concert

ATS-6, the world's first experimental educational and direct broadcast satellite (DBS), was launched on 30 May 1974. It transmitted at 860 MHz using wideband Frequency Modulation (FM) and had two sound channels. The transmissions were focused on the Indian subcontinent but experimenters were able to receive the signal in Western Europe using home constructed equipment that drew on UHF television design techniques already in use.

The first in a series of Soviet geostationary satellites to carry direct-to-home television, Ekran 1, was launched on 26 October 1976. It used a 714 MHz UHF downlink frequency so that the transmissions could be received with existing UHF television technology rather than microwave technology.

The satellite television industry developed in the US from the cable television industry as communication satellites were being used to distribute television programming to remote cable television headends. Home Box Office (HBO), Turner Broadcasting System (TBS), and Christian Broadcasting Network (CBN, later The Family Channel) were among the first to use satellite television to deliver programming. Taylor Howard of San Andreas, California, became the first person to receive C-band satellite signals with his home-built system in 1976.

In the US, PBS, a non-profit public broadcasting service, began to distribute its television programming by satellite in 1978.

In 1979, Soviet engineers developed the Moskva (or Moscow) system of broadcasting and delivering of TV signals via satellites. They launched the Gorizont communication satellites later that same year. These satellites used geostationary orbits. They were equipped with powerful on-board transponders, so the size of receiving parabolic antennas of downlink stations was reduced to 4 and 2.5 metres. On October 18, 1979, the Federal Communications Commission (FCC) began allowing people to have home satellite earth stations without a federal government license. The front cover of the 1979 Neiman-Marcus Christmas catalogue featured the first home satellite TV stations on sale for $36,500. The dishes were nearly 20 feet (6.1 m) in diameter and were remote controlled. The price went down by half soon after that, but there were only eight more channels. The Society for Private and Commercial Earth Stations (SPACE), an organisation which represented consumers and satellite TV system owners, was established in 1980.

Early satellite television systems were not very popular due to their expense and large dish size. The satellite television dishes of the systems in the late 1970s and early 1980s were 10 to 16 feet (3.0 to 4.9 m) in diameter, made of fibreglass or solid aluminum or steel, and in the United States cost more than $5,000, sometimes as much as $10,000. Programming sent from ground stations was relayed from eighteen satellites in geostationary orbit located 22,300 miles (35,900 km) above the Earth.

=== TVRO/C-band satellite era, 1980–1986 ===
By 1980, satellite television was well established in the US and Europe. On 26 April 1982, the first satellite channel in the UK, Satellite Television Ltd. (later Sky One), was launched. Its signals were transmitted from the ESA's Orbital Test Satellites. Between 1981 and 1985, TVRO systems' sales rates increased as prices fell. Advances in receiver technology and the use of gallium arsenide FET technology enabled the use of smaller dishes. Five hundred thousand systems, some costing as little as $2000, were sold in the US in 1984. Dishes pointing to one satellite were even cheaper. People in areas without local broadcast stations or cable television service could obtain good-quality reception with no monthly fees. The large dishes were a subject of much consternation, as many people considered them eyesores, and in the US most condominiums, neighborhoods, and other homeowner associations tightly restricted their use, except in areas where such restrictions were illegal. These restrictions were altered in 1986 when the Federal Communications Commission ruled all of them illegal. A municipality could require a property owner to relocate the dish if it violated other zoning restrictions, such as a setback requirement, but could not outlaw their use. The necessity of these restrictions would slowly decline as the dishes got smaller.

Originally, all channels were broadcast in the clear (ITC) because the equipment necessary to receive the programming was too expensive for consumers. With the growing number of TVRO systems, the program providers and broadcasters had to scramble their signal and develop subscription systems.

In October 1984, the U.S. Congress passed the Cable Communications Policy Act of 1984, which gave those using TVRO systems the right to receive signals for free unless they were scrambled, and required those who did scramble to make their signals available for a reasonable fee. Since cable channels could prevent reception by big dishes, other companies had an incentive to offer competition. In January 1986, HBO began using the now-obsolete VideoCipher II system to encrypt their channels. Other channels used less secure television encryption systems. The scrambling of HBO was met with much protest from owners of big-dish systems, most of which had no other option at the time for receiving such channels, claiming that clear signals from cable channels would be difficult to receive. Eventually HBO allowed dish owners to subscribe directly to their service for $12.95 per month, a price equal to or higher than what cable subscribers were paying, and required a descrambler to be purchased for $395. This led to the attack on HBO's transponder Galaxy 1 by John R. MacDougall in April 1986. One by one, all commercial channels followed HBO's lead and began scrambling their channels. The Satellite Broadcasting and Communications Association (SBCA) was founded on December 2, 1986, as the result of a merger between SPACE and the Direct Broadcast Satellite Association (DBSA).

Videocipher II used analog scrambling on its video signal and Data Encryption Standard–based encryption on its audio signal. VideoCipher II was defeated, and there was a black market for descrambler devices which were initially sold as "test" devices.

=== 1987 to present ===
By 1987, nine channels were scrambled, but 99 others were available free-to-air. While HBO initially charged a monthly fee of $19.95, soon it became possible to unscramble all channels for $200 a year. Dish sales decreased from 600,000 in 1985 to 350,000 in 1986, but pay television services saw dishes as positive since some people would never have cable service, and the industry was starting to recover as a result. Scrambling also led to the development of pay-per-view events. On November 1, 1988, NBC began scrambling its C-band signal but left its K_{u} band signal unencrypted so affiliates would not lose viewers who could not see their advertising. Most of the two million satellite dish users in the United States still used C-band. ABC and CBS were considering scrambling, though CBS was reluctant due to the number of people unable to receive local network affiliates. The piracy on satellite television networks in the US led to the introduction of the Cable Television Consumer Protection and Competition Act of 1992. This legislation enabled anyone caught engaging in signal theft to be fined up to $50,000 and to be sentenced to a maximum of two years in prison. A repeat offender can be fined up to $100,000 and be imprisoned for up to five years.

Satellite television had also developed in Europe but it initially used low power communication satellites and it required dish sizes of over 1.7 metres. On 11 December 1988, however, Luxembourg launched Astra 1A, the first satellite to provide medium power satellite coverage to Western Europe. This was one of the first medium-powered satellites, transmitting signals in K_{u} band and allowing reception with small dishes (90 cm). The launch of Astra beat the winner of the UK's state Direct Broadcast Satellite licence holder, British Satellite Broadcasting, to the market.

Commercial satellite broadcasts have existed in Japan since 1992 led by NHK which is influential in the development of regulations and has access to government funding for research. Their entry into the market was protected by the Ministry of Posts and Telecommunications (MPT) resulting in the WOWOW channel that is encrypted and can be accessed from NHK dishes with a decoder.

In the US in the early 1990s, four large cable companies launched PrimeStar, a direct broadcasting company using medium power satellites. The relatively strong transmissions allowed the use of smaller (90 cm) dishes. Its popularity declined with the 1994 launch of the Hughes DirecTV and Dish Network satellite television systems.

Digital satellite broadcasts began in 1994 in the United States through DirecTV using the DSS format. They were launched (with the DVB-S standard) in South Africa, Middle East, North Africa and Asia-Pacific in 1994 and 1995, and in 1996 and 1997 in European countries including France, Germany, Spain, Portugal, Italy and the Netherlands, as well as Japan, North America and Latin America. Digital DVB-S broadcasts in the United Kingdom and Ireland started in 1998. Japan started broadcasting with the ISDB-S standard in 2000.

On March 4, 1996, EchoStar introduced Digital Sky Highway (Dish Network) using the EchoStar 1 satellite. EchoStar launched a second satellite in September 1996 to increase the number of channels available on Dish Network to 170. These systems provided better pictures and stereo sound on 150–200 video and audio channels, and allowed small dishes to be used. This greatly reduced the popularity of TVRO systems. In the mid-1990s, channels began moving their broadcasts to digital television transmission using the DigiCipher conditional access system.

In addition to encryption, the widespread availability, in the US, of DBS services such as PrimeStar and DirecTV had been reducing the popularity of TVRO systems since the early 1990s. Signals from DBS satellites (operating in the more recent K_{u} band) are higher in both frequency and power (due to improvements in the solar panels and energy efficiency of modern satellites) and therefore require much smaller dishes than C-band, and the digital modulation methods now used require less signal strength at the receiver than analog modulation methods. Each satellite also can carry up to 32 transponders in the K_{u} band, but only 24 in the C band, and several digital subchannels can be multiplexed (MCPC) or carried separately (SCPC) on a single transponder. Advances in noise reduction due to improved microwave technology and semiconductor materials have also had an effect. However, one consequence of the higher frequencies used for DBS services is rain fade where viewers lose signal during a heavy downpour. C-band satellite television signals are less prone to rain fade.

In a return to older (but proven) technologies of satellite communication, the current DBS-based satellite providers in the US (Dish Network and DirecTV) now utilize additional capacity on the K_{u}-band transponders of existing FSS-class satellites, in addition to the capacity on their own existing fleets of DBS satellites. This was done to provide more channel capacity for their systems, as required by the increasing number of High-Definition and simulcast local station channels. The reception of the channels carried on the K_{u}-band FSS satellite's respective transponders was achieved by DirecTV & Dish Network issuing to subscribers dishes twice the diameter (36") than the previous 18" (& 20" for the Dish Network "Dish500") dishes used initially, equipped with 2 circular-polarized LNBFs (for reception of 2 native DBS satellites of the provider, 1 per LNBF), and 1 standard linear-polarized LNB for reception of channels from an FSS-type satellite. These newer DBS/FSS-hybrid dishes, marketed by DirecTV and Dish Network as the "SlimLine" and "SuperDish" models respectively, are the current standard for both providers, with their original 18"/20" single or dual LNBF dishes either now obsolete, or only used for program packages, separate channels, or services only broadcast over the providers' DBS satellites.

On 29 November 1999 US President Bill Clinton signed the Satellite Home Viewer Improvement Act (SHVIA). The act allowed Americans to receive local broadcast signals via direct broadcast satellite systems for the first time.

== Legal ==
The 1963 Radio Regulations of the International Telecommunication Union (ITU) defined a "broadcasting satellite service" as a "space service in which signals transmitted or retransmitted by space stations, or transmitted by reflection from objects in orbit around the Earth, are intended for direct reception by the general public."

In the 1970s some states grew concerned that external broadcasting could alter the cultural or political identity of a state leading to the New World Information and Communication Order (NWICO) proposal. However, satellite broadcasts can not be restricted on a per-state basis due to the limitations of the technology. Around the time the MacBride report was released, satellite broadcasting was being discussed at the UN Committee on the Peaceful Uses of Outer Space (COPUOS) where most of the members supported prior consent restrictions for broadcasting in their territories, but some argued this would violate freedom of information. The parties were unable to reach a consensus on this and in 1982 submitted UNGA Res 37/92 ("DBS Principles") to the UN General Assembly which was adopted by a majority vote, however, most States capable of DBS voted against it. The "DBS Principles" resolution is generally regarded as ineffective.

== See also ==
- Basic Interoperable Scrambling System
- Cable television
- List of satellite television companies
- Television receive-only
- Satellite television by region
- Commercialization of space
- Free-to-air
- Microwave antenna
- Molniya orbit
- Murphy v Media Protection Services Limited
- Satellite dish
- Satellite subcarrier audio
- Smart TV: provides television via internet connection
- SMATV
- Television antenna
