= DC2 =

DC2 may refer to:

- Device Control Two, one of the C0 and C1 control codes
- DigiCipher 2, a proprietary standard format of digital signal transmission and encryption
- Douglas DC-2, a 14-seat twin-engined airliner produced by the American company Douglas Aircraft Corporation 1934–1939
- Acura/Honda Integra DC2 chassis
- Dance Central 2, a 2011 video game
- Dino Crisis 2, a 2000 video game

== See also ==
- DCII (disambiguation)
