= DCII =

DCII may refer to:

- Douglas DC-2
- 602, year in Roman numerals
- The number 602 in Roman numerals.
- Da Capo II
- DigiCipher 2
- An abbreviation for the DirectCU II cooling system from Asus

See also

- DC2 (disambiguation)
