= PrimeStar =

Defunct American direct broadcast satellite company

- Industry: Direct broadcast satellite broadcasting
- Founded: November 1990; 35 years ago
- Defunct: September 30, 2000; 25 years ago
- Fate: Acquired by DirecTV
- Successor: DirecTV
- Headquarters: Denver, Colorado
- Website: Primestar.com

PrimeStar was an American direct broadcast satellite broadcasting company formed in November 1990 by seven cable television companies including Comcast Corp. and TCI Communications Corp. PrimeStar was the first medium-powered DBS system in the United States but slowly declined in popularity with the arrival of DirecTV in 1994 and Dish Network in 1996.

== Technology ==
PrimeStar was a medium-powered DBS-style system utilizing FSS technology that used a larger 3-foot (91 cm) satellite dish to receive signals.

Broadcast originally in analog, they later converted to digital technology. The system used the DigiCipher 1 system for conditional access control and video compression. The video format was MPEG-2. Primestar's satellite receivers were made by General Instrument.

PrimeStar was owned by a consortium of cable television companies who leased equipment to subscribers through the local cable company.

The company was in the process of converting to a high-powered DBS platform when it was purchased and shut down by DirecTV. The Tempo-1 and Tempo-2 DBS satellites acquired by PrimeStar from the defunct ASkyB were renamed DirecTV-5 and DirecTV-6, respectively.

== History ==
The system initially launched using medium-powered FSS satellites that were facing obsolescence with the onset of high-powered DBS and its much smaller, eighteen-inch satellite dishes. In a move to convert the platform to DBS, PrimeStar, originally based in Bala Cynwyd, Pennsylvania before moving to the suburbs of Denver, Colorado in 1997, bid for the 110-degree satellite location that was eventually awarded to a never-launched direct broadcast satellite service by MCI and News Corporation called ASkyB, or American Sky Broadcasting, named after News Corp's British Sky Broadcasting, also named as a combination of the merged companies British Satellite Broadcasting and Sky Television.

The ASkyB company sold the incomplete Tempo 1 and Tempo 2 DBS satellites to PrimeStar in the process of going out of business. PrimeStar launched Tempo-2 in 1997 but it was not used for many years. PrimeStar stored the other satellite, Tempo-1, until the company and the two satellites were purchased by DirecTV. DirecTV eventually launched the Tempo 1 satellite after years of delays as the DirecTV-5 satellite in 2002. Meanwhile, ASkyB's license for the 110-degree satellite location, and an uplink center, was resold to EchoStar, the parent company of Dish Network. The 110-degree satellite is now named EchoStar West 110 and is the most commonly used satellite, along with 119 as both can be received with a single wide-format parabolic dish, providing signal to North America.

PrimeStar Partners sold its assets to DirecTV in 1999 and after briefly being known as PrimeStar by DirecTV all subscribers were converted to the DirecTV platform in 2000. The PrimeStar brand and its FSS broadcast platform was shut down. Meanwhile, Tempo 1 and Tempo 2 satellite remained and were renamed DirecTV-5 and DirecTV-6, respectively, and moved to several locations to serve DirecTV customers.

== Features ==
During Primestar's years as a competing satellite television provider, it originally had a 95-channel lineup. However, beginning on April 20, 1997, Primestar announced it would add 65 channels, for a total of 160 channels. However, due to a lack of capacity on the FSS platform, many channels only aired for part of the day or week (e.g., MuchMusic USA aired weekdays from 2:00 a.m. to 5:00 p.m. ET, and weekends from 12:00 to 5:00 p.m. ET). Primestar, also at this time in 1997, grouped their channels by category, (e.g., "NEWS", "FAMILY", "SPORTS", "MOVIES", etc.), and added a color-coded button on the remote for each category. When pressed, it would bring the user to the beginning of that category, (e.g., pressing the orange "FAMILY" button would bring the user to Nickelodeon which was first in that category). Primestar called this feature "Hyper-Surfing". (Earlier remotes that lacked the buttons could instead use repetitive channel numbers to bring them to the desired category.)

== New uses for old equipment ==
Old PrimeStar satellite dishes are popular among hobbyists for free-to-air (FTA) satellite broadcasts on the K_{u} band transponders of FSS satellites.

The dishes are also popular for wireless computer networking as high-gain Wi-Fi antennas. The antennas are also used by amateur (ham) radio operators to transmit two-way amateur television.

== See also ==
- AlphaStar (satellite broadcasting service), a defunct satellite broadcaster that also used medium-powered FSS satellites and larger dishes.
- DirecTV, a direct competitor using high-powered DBS satellites and smaller dishes.
- Dish Network, a direct competitor using high-powered DBS satellites and smaller dishes.
- Orby TV, a short-lived discount DBS operator that leased service instead of operating their own fleet.
- Shaw Direct, a Canadian broadcaster using medium-powered FSS satellites and larger dishes.
- Bell Satellite TV, a Canadian broadcaster using high-powered DBS satellites and smaller dishes.
- Free-to-air
