= General Instrument =

American electronics manufacturer

- Final logo used from 1994 until 1997
- Traded as: NYSE: GRL (1967–2000)
- Founded: 1939; 87 years ago in Montgomery County, Pennsylvania, United States
- Defunct: 1997; 29 years ago
- Fate: Split/Acquired
- Headquarters: Horsham, Pennsylvania, United States
- Key people: Moses Shapiro, Chairman; Frank G. Hickey, chief executive officer; Donald Rumsfeld, chief executive officer
- Products: Electronics
- Parent: Motorola

General Instrument (GI) was an American electronics manufacturer based in Horsham, Pennsylvania, specializing in semiconductors and cable television equipment. They formed in New York City in 1923 as an electronics manufacturer. During the 1950s, the company began a series of acquisitions under the direction of Moses Shapiro. Among the more notable purchases was General Transistor in 1960, which led to GI becoming a major producer of transistors, and later, integrated circuits (ICs). By the late 1960s, the company was mostly depending on sales into the television industry, which was further bolstered by the 1967 purchase of Jerrold Electronics.

The company changed markets continually. Through the 1970s they focused mostly on the off-track betting market through their purchase of American Totalisator, but this market faced significant competition in the late 1970s. At this time, GI became well known for their ICs including the CP1600 used in the Mattel Intellivision game console, the AY-3-8910 series of sound chips that were used in a huge variety of designs, and the PIC microcontrollers which remain in production as of 2026. They also became increasingly active in the cable television field, emerging as the primary supplier in this market by the late 1980s. They sold off their IC division to form Microchip Technology in 1987, leaving them almost entirely dependent on the television market.

GI became a major leader in the development of high definition television. As this market began to saturate, the company split into three parts in 1997; CommScope took the cable infrastructure products, NextLevel the consumer television side, and General Semiconductor the power electronics products. NextLevel took over the GI name the next year. This new GI was purchased by Motorola in 2000, which was in turn purchased by Google who spun out the television side to ARRIS. ARRIS was then purchased by CommScope in 2018, once again bringing together all of GI's original television divisions. General Semiconductor continues to operate separately.

== History ==
Moses Shapiro, father of former Monsanto head Robert B. Shapiro, was chairman from 1969 to 1975. Frank G. Hickey was chief executive officer from 1975 to 1990, and Donald Rumsfeld from 1990 to 1993.

=== Shapiro era ===
The company initially formed in New York City in 1923 as an electronics manufacturer.

In the 1950s, the company president Moses Shapiro began buying a variety of electronics companies, mostly from the New York area. An early purchase was F. W. Sickles Company, a radio manufacturer, which was fully merged in 1951. In April 1957 they added Radio Receptor Company, in 1959 Harris Transducer, and among their more notable purchases, closed General Transistor in 1960. Most of these were left to operate as wholly owned but independent divisions. The buying continued through the 1960s, added Signalite in 1966 and Universal Controls and American Totalisator in 1967. A more major purchase was Jerrold Electronics in December 1967, which became the company's consumer-facing brand for television-related products, mostly through their cable television products.

1970 saw a series of layoffs and downsizing as the poorly performing parts of the conglomerate began to drag down profits. As part of this, the company's interest in several cable television stations were sold off, mostly through their Jerrold division. As soon as the company's financials improved, the buying spree started anew, buying another five companies by 1975. This had turned them into a $500-million-a-year company, but left them deeply in debt.

=== Hickey era ===
Shapiro retired in 1975 and was replaced by Frank Hickey, who focused the company on its two most profitable markets, cable television and gaming. The gaming market was primarily through their purchase of American Totalisator, who ran racetrack systems. GI expanded this into off-track betting and by 1979 they supplied 90% of all the off-track systems in North America.

By 1980, Hickey had managed to sell off most of the poorly-performing divisions and company debt had been reduced from 100% of assets to 20%. The success with American Totalisator began to wane as other companies, notably Control Data and Datatrol, began to push down profits. But any losses in this market were overshadowed by the massive expansion of cable television, which quickly took over from the betting systems as the company's primary profit center. In October 1982 they won a $100 million contract to supply over 300 cable TV stations with head end systems.

Through the mid-1980s the company suffered a series of reversals. Looking for new markets, in 1986 they bought M/A-COM's cable division. M/A-COM had earlier purchased VideoCipher, who had developed the industry-standard system for scrambling and decoding satellite television signals, VideoCipher II. This product took some time to start to sell, but by 1987 they were seeing demand outstrip supply. By the end of the year they had total sales of $1.16 billion. This success was short-lived, and by 1990 they were once again operating at a loss.

=== Rumsfeld era ===
In August 1990, the company was purchased in a friendly leveraged buyout of $1.6 billion by the FLGI Holding. In October 1990, they announced that Hickey would be replaced by Donald Rumsfeld. He sold off several divisions to cut overhead. The company then began investing heavily in the emerging high definition television (HDTV) market. To continue operations they laid off large numbers of staff, mostly at the headquarters. In 1992 they demonstrated their HDTV system and won a contract for 100,000 compressors. This led Rumsfeld to launch an initial public offering in 1993, after which he left the company in August.

=== Breakup ===
The HDTV market stabilized the company for a time, but by the mid-90s other entrants were once again eroding the company's profits. In 1997 the company split into three parts, General Semiconductor (power electronics), CommScope (cable infrastructure) and NextLevel Systems (cable and satellite systems). NextLevel took over the GI name in February 1998.

The "new" GI Corporation was acquired by Motorola in January 2000 for $17 billion and became the new Broadband Communication Sector (BCS) along with an acquisition of Zenith Network Systems a few months later. After being called Connected Home Solutions, it was renamed Home and Networks Mobility in 2007. When Motorola split on January 4, 2011, this division became part of Motorola Mobility. On December 19, 2012, ARRIS announced that it would acquire Motorola Mobility's Home unit (the former GI company) from Google for $2.35 billion in cash and stock. The acquisition was completed on April 17, 2013.

On November 8, 2018, CommScope announced that it would acquire ARRIS in a cash deal valued at $7.4 billion including the repayment of debt. This acquisition brings back together two of the former General Instrument companies from the 1997 split.

== VideoCipher Division ==
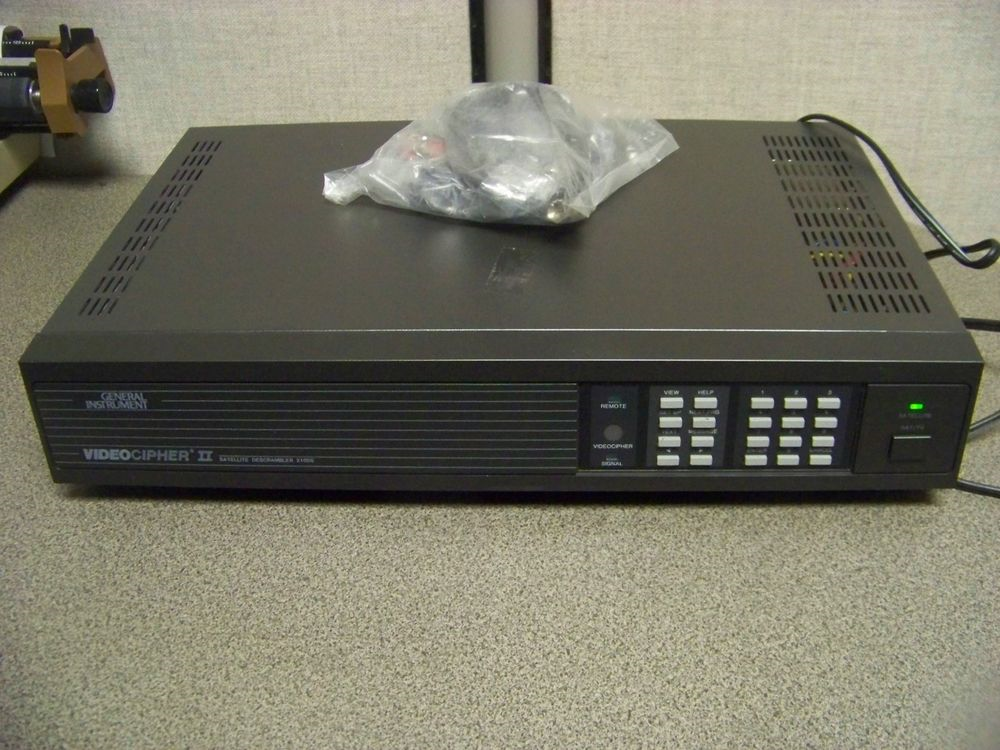
Videocipher II satellite descrambler

General Instrument produced receivers for old C and Ku band satellites. They also produced Videocipher units as well as digital equipment. 4DTV was a system for picking up free and encrypted analog and digital satellite subscription channels. It also included an interactive guide. The product line included:

- 2700 Series: on screen displays, C/Ku switching, digital sound, satellite memory increases with the model number.
- 2600 Series: similar to 2400 except with on-screen displays.
- 2400/2500 Series: There were no on-screen displays: everything was controlled from the remote and front panel. Two alphanumeric displays indicated the current satellite and transponder. A GI 2000PS was needed to use a dish motor. Digital Stereo Audio was available on VideoCipher channels, C/Ku compatible. The 2400 was re-branded in the early 1990s by Rural Cable and sold with a fixed C band dish pointed at Galaxy 5.
- 350 Regular: simple receiver with a separate dish mover (some will have a stationary G5 satellite).
- 350i Super: extensive on-screen displays, 50 satellites (C or Ku with external switch), digital sound.
- 450i/550i/650i: extensive on-screen displays, C/Ku pre-programmed satellites, digital sound, extras.
- 4DTV: interactive program guide, two favorite lists, C/Ku band, many other features.
- InfoCipher 1500P: an early satmodem used with one-way data services, such as X*Press X*Change.

== American Totalisator Corporation/AmTote ==
American Totalisator was a division of General Instrument Corp. It manufactured tote boards for the horse racing industry. It is now owned by horse-track operator Magna Entertainment Corporation.

== Underseas Lab (Harris ASW) ==
Underseas Lab, a division of General Instrument Corp., located in Westwood, Massachusetts. It invented and manufactured multibeam sonars used in ocean floor mapping. It was acquired by Channel Technologies and is now owned by L-3 Communications.

== Jerrold ==
Jerrold was GI's original cable TV brand, active from 1948 into the early 1990s. Around 1993, GI dropped the Jerrold name from their product lines. The Jerrold brand was prominent on both addressable and non-addressable cable TV converter boxes that were used on non-cable ready sets and cable-ready sets with premium pay services. "Jerrold" is the middle name of the company's founder, Milton Jerrold Shapp, who became Pennsylvania's 40th governor in 1971. Shapp's given name was Milton Shapiro.

== GI Microelectronics ==
General Instrument wordmark introduced c. 1980

GI Microelectronics monogram used in the 1970s

GI Microelectronics monogram used in the 1980s (both as seen etched and silkscreened on chips and printed circuit boards)

GI Microelectronics was a manufacturer of LSI circuits and a pioneer in MOS technology and Electrically Alterable ROM (EAROM), with both off-the-shelf and custom circuits. GI spun the division off as Microchip Technology in 1987.

In 1980, their product catalog included:

- 16-bit Microprocessor: CP1600 and 1610, a 16-bit CPU, used in the GIMINI TV-game set and in Mattel's Intellivision
- 8-bit Microcontroller: the PIC1650, an NMOS chip. The CMOS version of this chip is the basis of today's PIC microcontrollers.
- ROM
- EAROM
- Telecommunications chips

Other products included the famous AY-3-8910/11/12/14 series of sound chips, the AY-3-85xx, 86xx, 87xx series of game chips and a single-chip speech synthesizer, the SP0256 Narrator. A version of the SP0256 appeared in Mattel's Intellivoice. The popular SP0256-AL2 variant came with a set of allophones built in.

In 1965, Frank Wanlass moved to General Instrument Microelectronics Division in New York. Wanlass and other GI engineers promoted four-phase logic throughout the industry. J. L. Seely, manager of MOS Operations at General Instrument Microelectronics Division, also wrote about four-phase logic in late 1967.

== See also ==
- GTE mainStreet
- Morris Chang
