= Sun outage =

Satellite signal loss due to solar alignment

A Sun outage, Sun transit, or Sun fade is an interruption in, or distortion of geostationary satellite signals caused by interference (background noise) of the Sun when it falls directly behind a satellite which an Earth station is trying to receive data from or transmit data to. It usually occurs briefly to such satellites twice per year and such Earth stations install temporary or permanent guards to their receiving systems to prevent equipment damage.

Sun outages occur before the March equinox (in February and March) and after the September equinox (in September and October) for the Northern Hemisphere, and occur after the March equinox and before the September equinox for the Southern Hemisphere. At these times, the apparent path of the Sun across the sky takes it directly behind the line of sight between an Earth station and a satellite. The Sun radiates strongly across the entire spectrum, including the microwave frequencies used to communicate with satellites (C band, K_{u} band, and K_{a} band), so the Sun swamps the signal from the satellite. The effects of a Sun outage range from partial degradation (increase in the error rate) to the total destruction of the signal. The effect sweeps from north to south from approximately 20 February to 20 April, and from south to north from approximately 20 August to 20 October, affecting any specific location for less than 12 minutes a day for a few consecutive days.

== Effect on Indian stock exchanges ==
In India, the BSE (Bombay Stock Exchange) and NSE (National Stock Exchange) use VSATs (Very Small Aperture Terminals) for members (e.g. stockbrokers) to connect to their trading systems. VSATs depend upon satellites for connectivity between the terminals/systems. Hence, these exchanges are, with considerable predictability, affected by sun outages.

Until 2009, both BSE and NSE interrupted trading sessions due to sun outages. As of 2009, this practice ended, with the stock exchanges urging members to "review their current connectivity set up" and making "alternative arrangements for continuing trading without any disruption".

== Other locations ==
Saint Helena suffers from island-wide loss of Internet and telecommunications connections during Sun outages because all telecommunications traffic to and from the island is carried on a single satellite link. Sun outage times are published in local newspapers.

As the majority of rural Alaska is served by satellite, population centers like Utqiaġvik, Kotzebue, and Nome suffer from this as well. Nome is the terminus of the annual Iditarod Trail Sled Dog Race, and due to its timing, announcements of the finishers are often delayed during these Sun outages.

== See also ==
- Satellite warfare
- Solar transit
