= Polar mount =

Movable mount for satellite dishes

A polar mount is a movable mount for satellite dishes that allows the dish to be pointed at many geostationary satellites by slewing around one axis. It works by having its slewing axis parallel, or almost parallel, to the Earth's polar axis so that the attached dish can follow, approximately, the geostationary orbit, which lies in the plane of the Earth's equator.

== Description ==
Polar mounts are popular with home television receive-only (TVRO) satellite systems where they can be used to access the TV signals from many different geostationary satellites. They are also used in other types of installations such as TV, cable, and telecommunication Earth stations although those applications usually use more sophisticated altazimuth or fix angle dedicated mounts. Polar mounts can use a simplified one axis design because geostationary satellite are fixed in the sky relative to the observing dish and their equatorial orbits puts them all in a common line that can be accessed by swinging the satellite dish along a single arc approximately 90 degrees from the mount's polar axis. This also allows them to use a single positioner to move the antenna in the form of a "jackscrew" or horizon-to-horizon gear drive. Polar mounts work in a similar way to astronomical equatorial mounts in that they point at objects at fixed hour angles that follow the astronomical right ascension axis. Like equatorial mounts, polar mounts require polar alignment. They differ from equatorial mounts in that the objects (satellites) they point at are fixed in position and usually require no tracking, just accurate fixed aiming.

=== Adjustments ===
When observed from the equator, geostationary satellites follow exactly the imaginary line of the Earth's equatorial plane on the celestial sphere (i.e. they follow the celestial equator). But when observed from other latitudes the fact that geostationary satellites are at a fixed altitude of 35,786 km (22,236 mi) above the Earth's equator, and vary in distance from the satellite dish due to the dish's position in latitude and longitude, means polar mounts need further adjustments to allow one axis slewing:

Declination angle
The declination angle or just "declination", from the astronomical term declination for the vertical value (north/south) on the celestial sphere, is a "tipping down" of the dish on the mount to allow it to observe geostationary satellites. When observed from any latitude other than the equator the observer is actually looking "down" on the satellite making it look as if it is just below the celestial equator, an angle from the celestial equator that increases with latitude. Polar mounts have mechanisms that allow the dish to be tipped down in a permanently fixed angle to match the declination angle. Mounts may also have a variable declination control to allow them to point at geosynchronous satellites in inclined orbits since those satellites have a constantly changing declination. (Adding such a declination axis to a polar mount results in an equatorial mount).
Declination offset
Because satellites toward the Eastern and Western sky are further away from the observing antenna, there is a change in the declination angle: towards the eastern and western limits the satellites get closer to the celestial equator because they are further out along the lines of perspective. To aim at this apparent shift in the arc of geostationary satellites polar mounts incorporate a slight offset in the angle of their polar axis towards the equator, called a declination offset, to more closely follow this arc. Slewing around a fixed axis which is not parallel with the Earth's rotation axis causes the dish to aim at a track in the equatorial plane which is (unless the dish is on the equator) an ellipse rather than a circle. Since the geostationary orbit is circular, the mount does not aim precisely at satellites at all longitudes. These slight differences in tracking have negligible effect on home C band and K_{u} band TVRO dishes since they have relatively wide-beam designs.

== See also ==
- Diseqc
- Equatorial mount
