= X*Press X*Change =

Obsolete computer-based news-ticker-style newsfeed service

X*Press X*Change is an obsolete computer-based news-ticker-style newsfeed service that existed during the late 1980s and much of the 1990s. The X*Press service debuted in late 1986 as a low cost, publicly available newswire service that used personal computers to read and process the real-time data. X*PRESS Information Services, Ltd. was a partnership between McGraw-Hill and former cable television giant Tele-Communications, Inc. (purchased by AT&T Corporation and later spun off). Data included delayed stock ticker quotes and news headlines from the Associated Press, Agence France-Presse, McGraw-Hill, Standard & Poor's, Reuters, and UPI. News from outside the U.S. was contributed by Kyodo, ITAR-TASS and Xinhua.

The X*Press service was transmitted by way of satellite. Specifically, the system's data stream was carried on C-Band satellite onboard CNN's (later WGN's) transponder using General Instrument (now part of Motorola) InfoCipher 1500P satmodem technology. The InfoCipher modem was an add-on to VideoCipher II+/RS TVRO receivers and received the data at 9600 bits per second.

Participating cable companies could also send the data signal over their distribution systems to cable subscribers, who used a cable TV version of the InfoCipher modem and software on a home computer to decode and display the information stream. The software — called X*Press X*Change and X*Press Executive — was available for the Amiga, Apple Macintosh, Apple II, Atari ST, and MS-DOS platforms, although the Macintosh version was considered superior to the MS-DOS version. Sometime in the 1990s, the X*Press X*Change service was renamed InGenius, and faded into obscurity shortly afterward with the rise of the modern Internet as well as improved cable television on-screen graphics technology. The X*Change/InGenius service was discontinued in 1997.

== Data protocol and user-developed software ==
X*PRESS kept the data stream protocol secret, revealing the specifications to certain software developers only under non-disclosure agreements.

Several users, unhappy with the limited capabilities of the PC software provided by X*PRESS or using computer systems for which X*PRESS did not provide any software, attempted to reverse-engineer the protocol of the data stream. This effort was helped by the fact that the Amiga version of X*Press X*Change was distributed on a floppy disk that had, by mistake, some random portions of the software source code on some of its unused blocks. The accidentally released source code provided some details and terminology used to describe the protocol, and other parts were purely reverse-engineered. It was never completely clear whether it was legal to publish or use the various forms of underground software that circulated among a small community of users.
