= All American Direct =

Television service provider based in Indianapolis, Indiana

All American Direct was an American brand-name consumer-electronics retailer and a distant-network satellite television service provider based in Indianapolis, Indiana. Prior to 2014, the company had an agreement with satellite TV company DISH Network to market and sell DISH Network products, as well as to provide DISH Network customers in remote locations with access to broadcast network programming from distant markets.

Notably, All American Direct was not a DISH Network subsidiary. Subscribers to the company's My Distant Network Package had to pay subscription fees separately and in addition to their monthly DISH Network subscription fees.

== History ==
All American Direct was founded in 1983 as nationwide C-Band satellite service provider and retailer National Programming Service, LLC. According to a company Web site, NPS continues to provide C-Band products and services and claims to be the largest C-Band programming provider in the U.S.

NPS first began offering C-Band programming in 1987 and first switched from selling large 7–12 foot-diameter C-Band dish antennae to providing small-dish services and equipment as DISH Network affiliate All American Dish in 2003. In 2006, All American Dish launched AllAmericanDirect.com, which "offer[s] a wide variety of consumer electronic products, such as High Definition televisions, Sirius Satellite Radio, Verizon Wireless, High-Speed Internet, and other related products."

== EchoStar Agreement ==
In late 2006 NPS entered into a multi-year contract with DISH Network parent company EchoStar Corporation that saw EchoStar provide NPS with domestic satellite capacity on EchoStar VII at 119° West longitude and on EchoStar X at 110° West longitude. The partnership came after a Florida court ordered EchoStar to cease providing distant-network programming in October 2006 after a 10-year legal battle over whether the satellite TV provider had violated the Copyright Act; in December 2006 DISH Network ceased all transmission of distant-network programming.

Initially, many satellite-TV industry commentators predicted that DISH Network would lose as much as $50 million per year in revenue as a result of the Florida decision; they also assumed that many DISH Network customers would abandon the satellite TV provider for competitor DirecTV. However, following its deal with EchoStar, AllAmericanDirect.com began offering distant network channels in connection with EchoStar, allowing DISH Network to defy these forecasts.

From December 2006 until February 2014, AllAmericanDirect.com offered ABC, NBC, CBS, and FOX as part of its Distant Network Package subscription service. Distant Network Package channels through All American Direct were accessible to DISH Network subscribers on channel ranges 241 to 248 for standard-definition broadcast networks. On January 30, 2013, Dish began carrying the channels in the 907 to 914 range. This was due to them moving the channels to accommodate Dish's new direction of grouping channels by genre. After February 13, the distant networks would disappear from the 241 to 248 range, and they would be found exclusively in the 907 to 914 range. Distant Network Package subscription fees ranged between $3.00 and $15.00 per month, or between $40 and $170 per year, on a channel-by-channel basis. These fees were paid directly to All American Direct and are separate and in addition to the subscriber's monthly DISH Network bill.

In December 2010, National Programming Service announced it would cease providing C-Band programming as of midnight, Dec. 26, 2010.

== Closure ==
All American Direct ceased operations on February 25, 2014, at 11:59 pm., resulting in the loss of services, including Distant Network channels, for millions of Dish Network subscribers nationwide.
