= Backhaul (broadcasting) =

Uncut program content

In the context of broadcasting, backhaul refers to uncut program content that is transmitted point-to-point to an individual television station or radio station, broadcast network or other receiving entity where it will be integrated into a finished TV show or radio show. The term is independent of the medium being used to send the backhaul, but communications satellite transmission is very common. When the medium is satellite, it is called a wildfeed.

Backhauls are also referred to sometimes as clean feeds, being clean in the sense that they lack any of the post-production elements that are added later to the feed's content (i.e. on-screen graphics, voice-overs, bumpers, etc.) during the integration of the backhaul feed into a finished show. In live sports production, a backhaul is used to obtain live game footage (usually for later repackaging in highlights shows) when an off-air source is not readily available. In this instance the feed that is being obtained contains all elements except for TV commercials or radio ads run by the host network's master control. This is particularly useful for obtaining live coverage of post-game press conferences or extended game highlights (melts), since the backhaul may stay up to feed these events after the network has concluded their broadcast.

Electronic news gathering, including live via satellite interviews, reporters' live shots, and sporting events are all examples of radio or television content that is backhauled to a station or network before being made available to the public through that station or network. Cable TV channels, particularly public, educational, and government access (PEG) along with (local origination) channels, may also backhauled to cable headends before making their way to the subscriber. Finished network feeds are not considered backhauls, even if local insertion is used to modify the content prior to final transmission.

There exists a dedicated group of enthusiasts who use TVRO (TV receive-only) gear such as satellite dishes to peek in on backhaul signals that are available on any of the dozens of broadcast satellites that are visible from almost any point on Earth. In its early days, their hobby was strengthened by the fact that most backhaul was analog and in the clear (unscrambled or unencrypted) which made for a vast smorgasbord of free television available for the technically inclined amateur. In recent years, full-time content and cable channels have added encryption and conditional access, and occasional signals are steadily becoming digital, which has had a deleterious effect on the hobby.

Some digital signals remain freely accessible (sometimes using K_{u} band dishes as small as one meter) under the international DVB-S standard or the US Motorola-proprietary Digicipher system. The small dishes may either be fixed (much like DBS antennas), positioned using a rotor (usually DiSEqC-standard) or may be toroidal in design (twin toroidal reflectors focus the incoming signal as a line, not a point, so that multiple LNBs may receive signals from multiple satellites). A blind-search receiver is often used to try every possible combination of frequency and bitrate to search for backhaul signals on individual communication satellites.

== Documentaries containing backhauled content ==
The 1992 documentary Feed was compiled almost entirely using unedited backhaul from political campaign coverage by local and network television. A similar documentary about the 1992 U.S. presidential election named Spin was made in the same way in 1995.
