= Videocipher =

Cable/satellite TV scrambling/descrambling brand

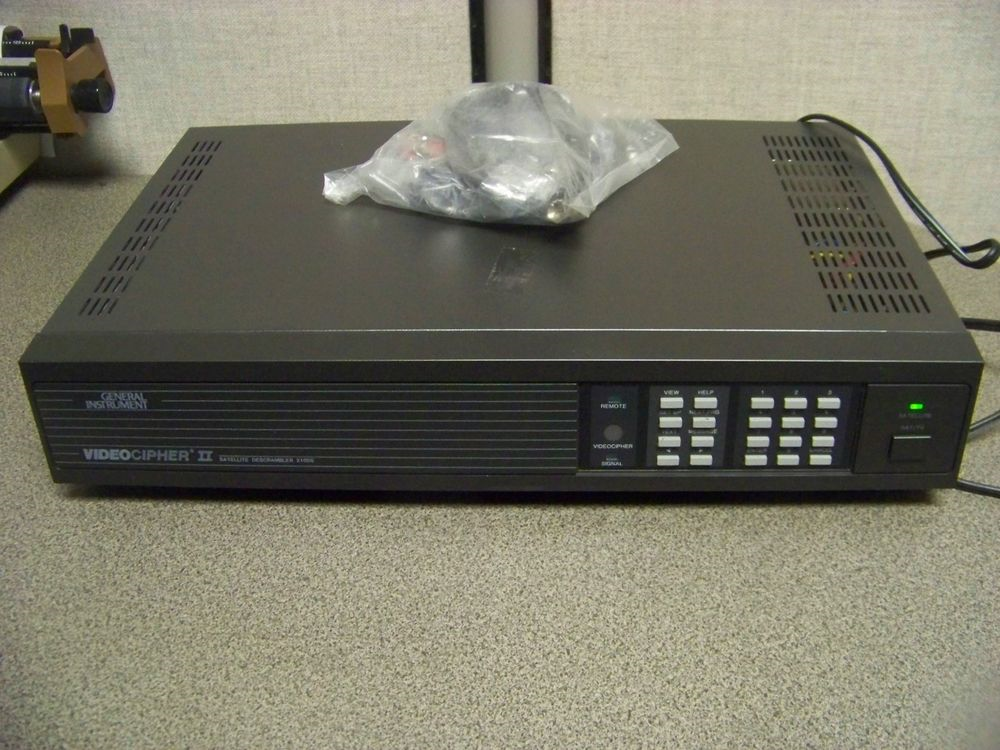
Videocipher II satellite descrambler stand-alone box sold by General Instrument

VideoCipher is a brand name of analog scrambling and de-scrambling equipment for cable and satellite television invented primarily to enforce Television receive-only (TVRO) satellite equipment to only receive TV programming on a subscription basis.

The second version of Videocipher, Videocipher II, was especially notable due to the widespread compromise of its encryption scheme.

== Background ==
=== Satellite providers ===
Through the first half of the 1980s, HBO, Cinemax and other premium television providers with analog satellite transponders faced a fast growing market of TVRO equipment owners. Satellite television consumers could watch these services simply by pointing their dish at a satellite, and tuning into the provider's transponder. Two open questions existed about this practice: whether the Communications Act of 1934 applied as a case of "unauthorized reception" by TVRO consumers; and to what extent it was legal for a service provider to encrypt their signals in an effort to prevent its reception.

The Cable Communications Policy Act of 1984 clarified all of these matters, making the following legal:

- Reception of unencrypted satellite signals by a consumer
- Reception of encrypted satellite signals by a consumer, when they have received authorization to legally decrypt it

This created a framework for the wide deployment of encryption on analog satellite signals. It further created a framework (and implicit mandate to provide) subscription services to TVRO consumers to allow legal decryption of those signals. HBO and Cinemax became the first two services to announce intent to encrypt their satellite feeds late in 1984.

=== Videocipher technology ===
Videocipher was invented in 1983 by Linkabit Corporation (later bought out by M/A-COM in 1985, operated as M/A-COM Linkabit). In the mid 1980s, M/A-COM began divesting divisions which fell outside their core RF & Microwave component and subsystem products. The Linkabit division was acquired by General Instrument in 1987.

Videocipher was used throughout the 1990s by Indonesian television networks RCTI and SCTV to encrypt some foreign programs (such as sports events and movies) as part of the term of their rights, to prevent overseas access so that the programs could only be accessed through the RCTI and SCTV networks via the national UHF/VHF frequency. Indovision also used Videocipher to encrypt their channels as a counteract against piracy between 1994 and 1997.

== Variants ==
There were several variants of the Videocipher scrambling system:

=== Videocipher I ===
This was the first version of the Videocipher system that was first demonstrated by Linkabit in 1983.

Also known as Videocipher IB, this variation on Videocipher was commonly used by sports backhauls. CBS used this system from 1987 to the mid-1990s to encrypt its transmissions to affiliates on the Telstar 301 and Telstar 302 satellites.

In Canada, the CTV television network also used this technology on its network feeds. With this system the video is scrambled by means of re-ordering the video scan lines, while all audio remains in the clear. This system was in use as late as the early 2000s.

Videocipher I (VCI) system was initially considered for use by HBO in the 1980s. HBO tested VCI extensively, but was ultimately rejected in favor of Videocipher II. HBO's use of VCI would have required descramblers for home satellite viewers. Due to costs involved with VC1, maintaining VCI a descrambler was determined to be too expensive for consumer use.

PBS in the USA used VideoCipher I on its satellite feeds to its member stations in the mid-80s to take advantage of the high-fidelity digital audio capability offered by VCI. This was desirable for some of the programming PBS would air in that era, such as classical concerts and other musical programming, some of which were simulcast by partnering public radio stations using the same audio feed. PBS had attempted in 1979 to send its program audio digitally to its member stations using a system called DATE (Digital Audio for TElevision), which used the existing analog video's vertical blanking interval (VBI) to send digital audio. VCI provided this same feature while freeing up the VBI for other purposes like closed-captioning and teletext, making DATE obsolete by the mid-1980s (however, DATE did offer 4 channels of audio as opposed to VideoCipher I's 2-channel stereo).

The Leitch Viewguard scrambling system used for satellite feeds as well used the same video line re-ordering as well, while also leaving the audio intact. ABC and Fox used Viewguard as well on their analog network feeds to their affiliate stations shortly before switching to digital satellite distribution in 2005 (for ABC) and 2004 (for Fox).

=== Videocipher II ===
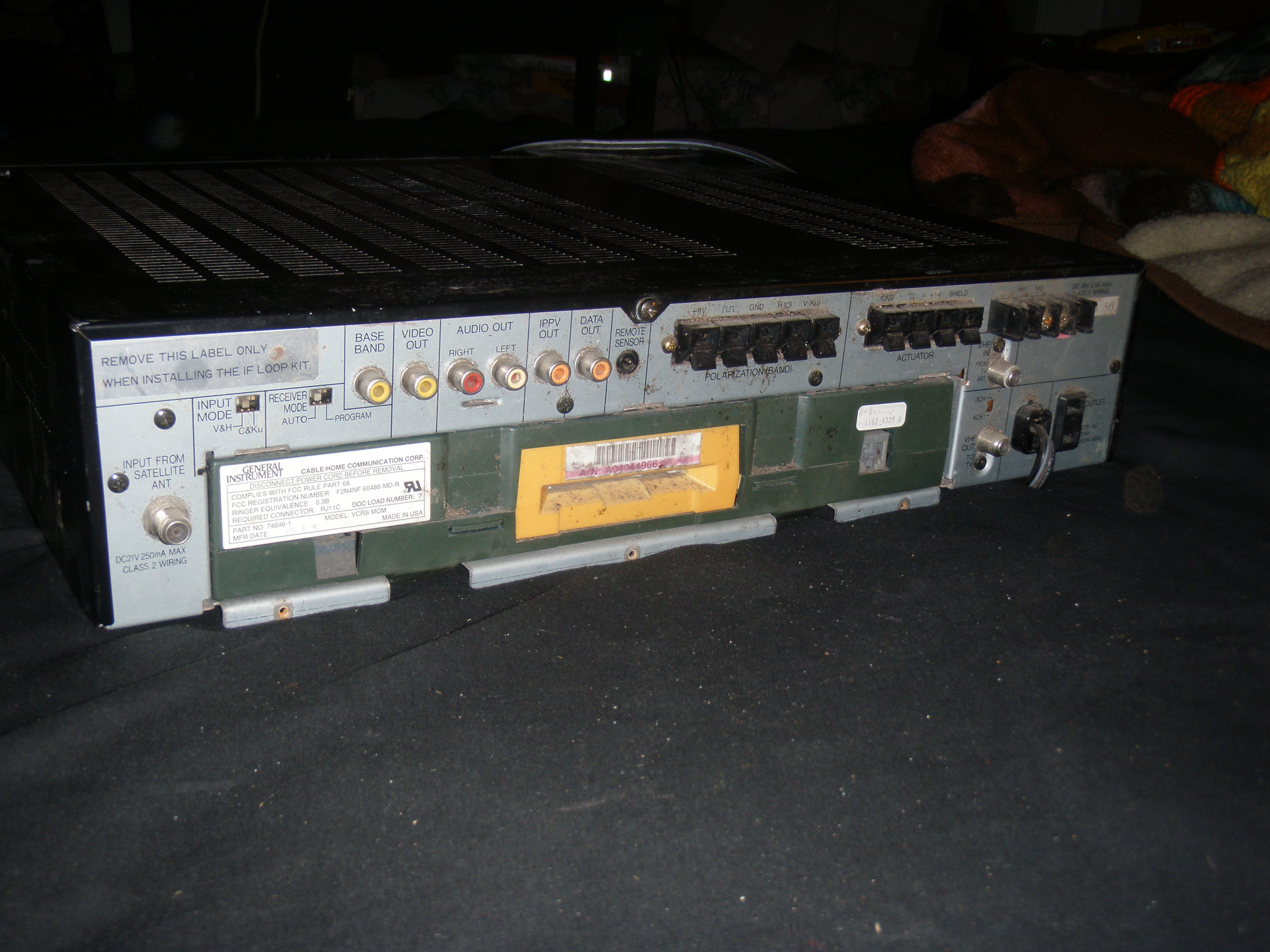
Back of a 1992 Toshiba satellite receiver with an installed VideoCipher II module

Videocipher II was the first consumer TVRO scrambling system. HBO and Cinemax, which had transponders on Satcom 3R and Galaxy 1, began encrypting their west coast feeds services with Videocipher II 12 hours a day early in 1985, then did the same with their east coast feeds by August. The two networks began scrambling full time on January 15, 1986, which in many contemporary news reports was called "S-Day". Within two years, encryption through Videocipher II was used by a majority of major cable television programmers. However, lapses in its security enabled some pirate decryption, modifying a consumer descrambler to receive free programming. Beginning in 1991, programmers began to phase out the VCII system in favor of the more secure Videocipher II Plus (RS) system. The system was fully phased out in 1993. Originally sold as a stand-alone decoder box that consisted of a fully electronic decoder and descrambler module, other satellite system manufacturers began to make their receivers with the GI descrambler module installed. This VCII system digitally encrypts stereo audio using the DES encryption scheme and scrambles video by inverting the video polarity and moving color information to a nonstandard area frequency. It is noteworthy that the Videocipher II Plus design did not alter the video scrambling scheme (only the audio encryption was improved). As such, a Videocipher II decoder is still capable of decoding the video portion of a Videocipher II Plus encrypted stream. In the late eighties and early nineties, VideoCipher II modules that had been pirated, began to receive constant Electronic Counter Measures (ECM).

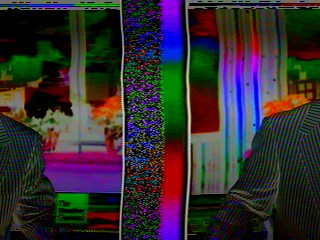
Example of encryption using VideoCipher II

In the early nineties, programmers increased the frequency of the top tier DES keys from monthly to near daily. Companies (such as Magna Systems) began offering services whereby users could continue to receive keys via fax electronic modifications/add-on boards such as "VMS" modems. These add-on modem modules would dial into a bulletin board system and automatically download the required keys to view all available programming.

Eventually (about 1992), HBO completely left the VideoCipher II datastream in favor of the more secure VideoCipher II Plus (RS) datastream; other programmers followed suit. Due to the differences of the VideoCipher II Plus datastream, video could appear to "flicker" or struggle on an old VideoCipher II module (modules with a newer "pirate chip" installed, tended to be less prone to this issue).

VideoCipher II was subject to ITAR restrictions on export of cryptography from the United States because of its use of DES, but an exception for consumer descramblers was added to the US Munitions List in 1992.

Videocipher II was implemented on Texas Instruments TMS7000 processors.

=== Videocipher II+/RS ===
In 1992, following years of security breaches with the Videocipher II system, General Instruments introduced the Videocipher II Plus descrambler module. In 1993, some VCII programming was phased out, especially premium movie channels and pay per view. For a time, many networks, like SportsChannel America, remained on the VC II stream. The Videocipher II+ was a higher-security system with two variants. The Videocipher-RS system (RS for Renewable Security) is the Videocipher II Plus system with a slot in the back of the descrambler module to where a card could be inserted to upgrade the security if the VCII Plus system were ever breached.

== Technological obsolescence ==
General Instrument discontinued production of VC II+ RS modules in 1998 in favor of its DigiCipher system. Over the next ten years, broadcasters migrated to digital transmission delivery and discontinued their analog feeds. In October 2008, Motorola (who acquired General Instruments in January 2000) announced that their authorization center would no longer authorize any new decoders after December 31, 2008, and that the current remaining analog Videocipher channels would switch entirely to digital transmission after that same date. The Weather Channel, the last major television network to utilize the VideoCipher II system, discontinued its analog signal on AMC 11 transponder 13 on June 26, 2014, effectively ending the Videocipher era.

== Legacy ==
Within the years of the change of signal scrambling from VC II to VCII+, DirecTV began to take on many former C band VideoCipher subscribers and illegal receivers of programming. Many who were involved with providing illegal VideoCipher II programming moved over to hacking and providing users illegal access to the (at the time) digital direct broadcast satellite systems.

== See also ==
- Television encryption
