= Headend in the Sky =

Cable channel distribution service

Managed Satellite Distribution (formerly known as Headend in the Sky/HITS) is Comcast's satellite multiplex service that provides cable channels to cable television operations.

Managed Satellite Distribution was founded in 1994 and its namesake product is commonly recognized as the pioneer of digital television in the United States. Managed Satellite Distribution was launched by TCI before their later 1999 purchase by the old AT&T, then merged with the smaller Comcast in 2002 as part their purchase of AT&T Broadband (formerly TCI). The Managed Satellite Distribution headquarters in Centennial, Colorado, formerly known as the National Digital Television Center, is now called the Comcast Media Center.

As of 2010, Managed Satellite Distribution offers 6 standard-definition multiplexes on SES Americom's SES-1, 12 standard-definition multiplexes and 8 HD multiplexes on AMC-18, 1 standard-definition multiplex on AMC-10, and 1 standard definition multiplex on Intelsat's Galaxy 17. As of 2010, HITS delivers more than 280 digitally compressed video and audio television programming signals to more than 2000 cable operation sites across the US.

== See also ==
- Cable television in the United States
