= PowerVu =

Conditional access system for digital television

PowerVu is a conditional access system for digital television developed by Scientific Atlanta. It is used for professional broadcasting, notably by Retevision, Bloomberg Television, Discovery Channel, AFRTS, ABS-CBN, GMA Network, and American Forces Network. It is also used by cable companies to prevent viewing by unauthorized viewers and non-cable subscribers.

PowerVu has decoders that decode signals from certain satellites for cable distribution services. These decoders can also be used just like the FTA (Free-To-Air) satellite receivers if properly configured.

== See also ==
- Basic Interoperable Scrambling System
