= Galaxy 1 =

TV and communications satellite (1983–1994)

- Mission type: Communication
- Operator: Hughes
- COSPAR ID: 1983-065A
- SATCAT no.: 14158
- Mission duration: 9 years (planned)

Spacecraft properties
- Bus: HS-376
- Manufacturer: Hughes Aircraft
- Dry mass: 1218 kg

Start of mission
- Launch date: 28 June 1983, 22:08:00 UTC
- Rocket: Delta-3920 / PAM-D
- Launch site: Cape Canaveral

End of mission
- Disposal: Graveyard orbit
- Deactivated: 1994

Orbital parameters
- Reference system: Geocentric orbit
- Regime: Geostationary orbit
- Longitude: 169.0° West

Transponders
- Band: 24 C-band
- Coverage area: United States

Galaxy 1 was the first in a line of Galaxy communications satellites launched by Hughes Communications in 1983.

It helped fill a hole in satellite broadcasting bandwidth created by the loss of RCA's Satcom 3 in 1979. Unlike satellite owners RCA and Western Union, Hughes did not lease time on their transponders in the fashion of a common carrier, but instead sold transponders outright to content providers. This created a stable lineup of content attractive enough for cable providers to dedicate Earth station receivers to it full-time.

Among the services on Galaxy 1 by mid-1984: HBO, Cinemax, The Movie Channel, Showtime, The Disney Channel, TBS, CNN, ESPN, and The Nashville Network.

== Retirement of Galaxy 1 ==
Galaxy 1 was originally slated for retirement in 1992 and replacement by Galaxy 1R, but the replacement was lost during launch on 22 August 1992, due to a failure of the booster rocket's second stage Centaur engine. Galaxy 1 was eventually replaced in 1994 by Galaxy 1RR.

== Home Box Office ==
The HBO (Home Box Office) signal on transponder 23 of Galaxy 1 was interrupted during the infamous Captain Midnight attack on 27 April 1986. The attack was directed at HBO for their adoption of the Videocipher system and for charging high prices for access to the HBO and Cinemax services with that system.

== See also ==
- List of Intelsat satellites
