= Single channel per carrier =

Dedicated use of satellite bandwidth

Single channel per carrier (SCPC) refers to using a single signal at a given frequency and bandwidth. Most often, this is used on broadcast satellites to indicate that radio stations are not multiplexed as subcarriers onto a single video carrier, but instead independently share a transponder. It may also be used on other communications satellites, or occasionally on non-satellite transmissions.

In an SCPC system, satellite bandwidth is dedicated to a single source. This makes sense if it is being used for something like satellite radio, which broadcasts continuously. Another very common application is voice, where a small amount of fixed bandwidth is required. However, it does not make sense for burst transmissions like satellite internet access or telemetry, since a customer would have to pay for the satellite bandwidth even when they were not using it.

Where multiple access is concerned, SCPC is essentially FDMA. Some applications use SCPC instead of TDMA, because they require guaranteed, unrestricted bandwidth. As satellite TDMA technology improves however, the applications for SCPC are becoming more limited.

== Advantages ==
- simple and reliable technology
- low-cost equipment
- any bandwidth (up to a full transponder)
  - usually 64 kbit/s to 50 Mbit/s
- easy to add additional receive sites (earth stations)

== Disadvantages ==
- inefficient use of satellite bandwidth for burst transmissions, typically encountered with packet data transmission
- usually requires on-site control
- When used in remote locations, the transmitting dish must be protected.

== MCPC ==
SCPC was the successor multiple channels per carrier (MCPC).

With MCPC, several subcarriers are combined or multiplexed into a single bitstream before being modulated onto a carrier transmitted from a single location to one or more remote sites. This uses time-division multiplexing (TDM) as well as frequency-division multiplexing. It is a retronym of sorts, as it was the only way radio networks were transmitted ("piggybacked" on television networks) until SCPC.

In digital radio and digital television, an ensemble or other multiplex or multichannel stations can be considered MCPC, though the term is generally only applied to satellites.

The major disadvantage of MCPC is that all of the signals must be sent to a single place first, then combined for retransmission — a major reason for using SCPC instead.

== Frequency hopping ==
SCPC became somewhat obsolete after the invention of frequency hopping.

Frequency hopping (FHSS) is a system invented by Hedy Lamarr in which radio signals rapidly change frequency to avoid interception. FHSS required the use of MCPC, as SCPC cannot change frequency mid-broadcast. FHSS was the basis for many technological advancements like Wi-Fi, Bluetooth, and GPS, which could not have been achieved with SCPC.
