= DigiCipher 2 =

Proprietary digital signal transmission format

DigiCipher 2, or simply DCII, is a proprietary standard format of digital signal transmission and it doubles as an encryption standard with MPEG-2/MPEG-4 signal video compression used on many communications satellite television and audio signals. The DCII standard was originally developed in 1997 by General Instrument, which then became the Home and Network Mobility division of Motorola, then bought by Google in Aug 2011, and lastly became the Home portion of the division to Arris.

The original attempt for a North American digital signal encryption and compression standard was DigiCipher 1, which was used most notably in the now-defunct PrimeStar medium-power direct broadcast satellite (DBS) system during the early 1990s. The DCII standard predates wide acceptance of DVB-based digital terrestrial television compression (although not cable or satellite DVB) and therefore is incompatible with the DVB standard.

Approximately 70% of first-generation digital cable networks in North America use the 4DTV/DigiCipher 2 format. The use of DCII is most prevalent in North American digital cable television set-top boxes. DCII is also used on Motorola's 4DTV digital satellite television tuner and Shaw Direct's DBS receiver.

The DigiCipher 2 encryption standard was reverse engineered in 2016.

== Technical specifications ==
DigiCipher II uses QPSK and BPSK at the same time. The primary difference between DigiCipher 2 and DVB lies in how each standard handles SI metadata, or System Information, where DVB reserves packet identifiers from 16 to 31 for metadata, DigiCipher reserves only packet identifier 8187 for its master guide table which acts as a look-up table for all other metadata tables. DigiCipher 2 also extends the MPEG program number that is assigned for each service in a transport stream with the concept of a virtual channel number, whereas the DVB system never defined this type of remapping preferring to use a registry of network identifiers to further differentiate program numbers from those used in other transport streams. There are also private non-standard additions to DVB that add virtual channel remapping using logical channel numbers. Also unlike DVB, all text used in descriptors can be compressed using standard Huffman coding which saves on broadcast bandwidth and loading times. DigiCipher II uses Dolby Digital AC-3 audio for all channels, although MPEG-1 Level 2 audio is not supported.
