= Canal+ (French TV channel) =

French television channel

- Country: France
- Headquarters: 50 rue Camille Desmoulins, 92130, Issy-les-Moulineaux, France

Programming
- Language: French
- Picture format: 2160p UHDTV (downscaled to 1080i and 576i for the HD and SD feeds respectively)

Ownership
- Owner: Canal+

History
- Launched: 1983; 43 years ago (company); 4 November 1984; 41 years ago (channel)
- Founder: Léo Scheer; André Rousselet; Pierre Lescure

Links
- Website: canalplus.com/canal+

Canal+ (French: [kanal plys], meaning "Channel Plus"), also spelt Canal Plus and sometimes abbreviated C+ or Canal, is a French premium television channel owned by Canal+. The channel was launched in Paris and Issy-les-Moulineaux on 4 November 1984, and broadcasts to Metropolitan France. It broadcasts several kinds of programming, mostly encrypted, but some unencrypted content can be viewed free of charge.

Canal+ was co-founded by André Rousselet and Pierre Lescure. An early pioneer was Alain de Greef, who joined in 1986.

== History ==
First logo, 1984–1995

In 1978, six years before Canal's launch, Jean Frydman, who had the TVCS (Télévision Communication Services) project, was planning a project to launch a fourth television channel in France, which had its roots in the previous Canal 10 project. Whilst waiting for a billing to create an encrypted TV channel, the TVCS project had first planned to produce and broadcast their own programmes during time slots when three French television channels began broadcasting a test card at night and in the morning. One year later in July 1979, it was announced that the channel had chosen to broadcast the programmes produced by public national television channel and the TVCS company Antenne 2 (now known as France 2) who had broadcast encrypted programmes that were originally intended for businesses or certain professionals.

In March 1984, eight months before the official launch, Canal+ started its retransmission tests in the Île-de-France region. Those first broadcasts were scheduled every day from 2 to 6 p.m. and consisted of music videos, animated short films, and various movie trailers.

Canal+ was launched in November 1984, when there were only three government-owned channels available in France. The company was co-founded by André Rousselet, president of the French multinational advertising company Havas, and Pierre Lescure (born c. 1945), who proved very popular with media professionals and politicians. It got off to a slow start, and some politicians, including Prime Minister Laurent Fabius, railed against the idea of having a commercial TV channel. However, Rousselet was a personal friend of the president, François Mitterrand, and so obtained favourable terms for the setup. Pierre Lescure was director-general at that time. A combination of political connections and clever programming – giving the French public American hit comedies and French drama not available on the government channels – worked, and subscriptions soon increased. Government regulations required that the channel give several hours of free programming each day, which was used by Canal+ to promote the subscription service. Its first logo was used from inception until 1995.

The channel initially had to use 45% of its airtime on films until the film industry pushed back. Sport, interview shows, documentaries, and soft pornography joined films as the main staples of programming at this time. Starting in 1985, Canal+ has had a tradition of showing one pornographic film every month at midnight, generally on the first Saturday of the month. In 1985, the government opened up the market to other private commercial television stations, offering some serious competition. However, aggressive marketing and policies ensured that the company kept growing.

Alain de Greef (c. 1947 – 29 June 2015) joined in 1986 joining his longtime friend Pierre Lescure. De Greef was first appointed director of production, then head of programmes, and finally director general (1986–2000). De Greef was later described as a pioneer and visionary, who set the tone and created the "Canal Plus spirit", which embodied anti-conformism along with edgy satire that became very popular. He created the satirical puppet show Les Guignols de l'Info and cult talk shows Nulle part ailleurs, Groland, and Les Deschiens.

In 1987, Canal+ went public. By 1989, Canal+ had almost three million subscribers. The company expanded into some European markets, notably Belgium, Spain, and Germany, and started setting up subsidiaries as it developed into Groupe Canal+.

In 1994, Rousselet quit the board and was replaced by director-general Lescure.

Digital satellite provider CanalSat was launched as a wholly owned subsidiary of Canal+ on 6 December 1991. On 27 April 1996, Canal+ received two new sister channels: Canal+ Jaune and Canal+ Bleu. A fourth channel, called Canal+ Vert, came along on 31 August 1998. The channels changed their names to Canal+ Confort (now known as Canal+ Décalé since 2005), Canal+ Cinéma, and Canal+ Sport on 1 November 2003.

In January 2000, the Lagardère Group purchased a major stake in the digital television division. In December 2000, Vivendi acquired Canal+. In 2001, co-founder Alain De Greef was fired from his position as director-general and replaced by Michel Denisot, when the organisation was restructured under the leadership of Jean-Marie Messier, chief executive of Vivendi. Criticism of Vivendi's poor share performance since the takeover grew, and in April 2002, De Greef's co-founder and CEO, Pierre Lescure, clashed with Messier and was fired.

An alternative logo was used between 2006 and 2009.

Alternative logo, 2006–2009

In September 2005, Canal+, Canal+ Cinéma, and Canal+ Sport started broadcasting in the French digital terrestrial television network. The free-to-air parts of Canal+ had already been broadcasting for a few months by then. In August 2008, Canal+ started broadcasting the encrypted parts of its main channel in high definition on the terrestrial network. Canal+ announced plans to turn off the analogue terrestrial signals by 2010.

In April 2014, Ligue 1, France's top association football league, sold broadcast rights for 2016–2020 to Canal+ for 726 million euros.

In July 2024, reports emerged that Vivendi was exploring a potential London Stock Exchange listing for Canal+. In December 2024, Canal+ Group was spun out as an independent company. The channel will leave the terrestrial platform in France in June 2025, alongside Canal+ Cinéma, Canal+ Sport and Planète+, as a result of the cut in its agreement with Arcom to keep its licences afloats as a response to the non-renewal of its free-to-air channel C8 by the Arcom. Only 70,000 subscribers receive Canal+ on terrestrial. From 6 June 2025, France 4 will take over its slot; from that day, the new digital terrestrial channel plan will be introduced. The number of subscribers has been decreasing to less than 30,000 on its final day of terrestrial broadcasts. Most terrestrial subscribers have easy access to other means where Canal+ can be found, such as satellite, IPTV decoders, and smart TVs. The said subscriber base is not affected. Terrestrial subscriptions did not account for their advertising revenue, only their mobile application. The channel alone saved €5-6 million per channel by leaving the terrestrial platform, for an approximate total of €20-24 million.

== Description ==
Canal+ broadcasts to Metropolitan France. Its programming is mostly encrypted, but some unencrypted programming can be viewed free of charge. The channel does not broadcast advertising, except when broadcasting on free-to-air slots. Almost all foreign films and series can be viewed either in their original language with French subtitles (on a secondary audio channel) or dubbed in French. All programs are subtitled in French for deaf people and those who struggle with hearing. Some programs also have audio description for those who are visually impaired.

Canal+ is a supporter of the Hybrid Broadcast Broadband TV (HbbTV) initiative, which promotes and establishes an open European standard for hybrid set-top boxes for the reception of broadcast TV and broadband multimedia applications with a single user interface.

== Encryption ==
=== Analogue ===
Originally, subscribers would be mailed a code to punch in on their decoder's control panel to view the encrypted service (using the RITC Discret 1 system); the code would be based upon the decoder's serial number (stored in the box's ROM). To avoid problems with customers' codes not being delivered on time by the postal system, Canal+ would switch to encryption based on a generic key, between the last day of the month (beginning at midnight) and the first Monday of the next month (until 9 AM). During this time, all decoders—even those with lapsed subscriptions—would be able to view the channel.

However, signal piracy was rampant, especially after the magazine Radio Plans printed decoder plans in its December 1984 issue. As a result of this, Canal+ switched to the much stronger Nagravision encryption system beginning in 1992; the Discret system was fully phased out by 1995. The new decoders utilised smart cards, cut into the shape of a key, and inserted into the front of the decoder. Different decoders using the D2-MAC standard were also deployed during this time, mostly for cable subscribers. With the launch of CanalSatellite, the Mediaguard encryption system was instituted, created by SECA (Société Européenne de Contrôle d'Accès), a firm owned by Canal+ and Bertelsmann; Canal+ eventually bought out Bertelsmann's stake and rebranded SECA as Canal+ Technologies. This firm was sold by 2003 to Thomson SA. The MediaGuard system's use in Britain (by the now defunct OnDigital/ITV Digital) led to hackers in the employ of Rupert Murdoch's rival encryption company NDS breaking into the MediaGuard system, resulting in new cards being issued to Canal+ subscribers in 2002 and Canal+ starting legal action against Murdoch. The Nagravision system continued in use until 30 November 2011, when all analog television broadcasting in France ceased.

== Sister channels ==
Les Chaînes Canal+ is the offer name regrouping the premium Canal+-branded channels in France. From 2003 to 2008 it was called Canal+ Le Bouquet.

Channel	Launched	Notes	Availability				Format
Channel	Launched	Notes	DTT	Satellite	IPTV	Cable	Format
Canal+	4 November 1984		Yes	Yes	Yes	Yes	16:9 Ultra HD
Canal+ Cinéma(s)	27 April 1996	A dedicated movie channel, previously known as Canal+ Jaune	No	Yes	Yes	Yes	1080i HDTV
Canal+ Sport	31 August 1998	A sports channel, previously known as Canal+ Vert	No	Yes	Yes	Yes	1080i HDTV
Canal+ Kids	9 September 2021	A channel broadcasting children's programmes, series, and cartoons, previously known as Canal+ Family	No	Yes	Yes	Yes	1080i HDTV
Canal+ Docs	9 September 2021	documentaries	No	Yes	Yes	Yes	1080i HDTV
Canal+ Grand Écran	8 February 2022	A dedicated movie channel	No	Yes	Yes	Yes	1080i HDTV
Canal+ Sport 360	31 August 2022	A sports channel, previously known as Canal+ Bleu and Canal+ Décalé	No	Yes	Yes	Yes	1080i HDTV
Canal+ Foot	31 August 2022	A sport channel, focused on football	No	Yes	Yes	Yes	1080i HDTV
Canal+ Box Office	1 September 2023	A dedicated movie channel, focused on recent cinema hits	No	Yes	Yes	Yes	1080i HDTV
Canal+ Live	10 September 2024	A bouquet of sports channels part of sports offers, previously known as Kiosque, Ciné+/À La Carte, and Multisports	No	Yes	Yes	Yes	1080i HDTV

== Programmes ==
=== Cinema ===
- Box-Office
- Canal+ Premières
- Coup de Cœur
- Surprises

==== Cinema Magazine ====
- Têtàtête(s)
- Tchi tcha
- L'hebd'Hollywood
- Le cercle cinéma
- Le journal du hard

=== Series ===
- Création Décalée
- Création Originale
- Fiction
- Une série Canal+

==== Series Magazine ====
- Le cercle séries
- Les coulisses d'une création originale

=== Sport ===
==== Sport Coverage ====
- Formula 1
- Masters Tournament
- MotoGP
- Premier League
- Ryder Cup
- Top 14
- UEFA Champions League
- UEFA Europa League
- UEFA Conference League

==== Sport Magazine ====
- Canal champions club
- Canal football club
- Canal rugby club
- Débrief moto
- En pôle
- Formula one
- Golf+ le mag
- La grille
- Match of ze day
- Soir d'Europe

==== Sport Documentary ====
- Doc sport
- Intérieur sport

=== Documentary ===
- Les bouveaux explorateurs
  - Alexia cuisine la france
  - Culture & street
  - Fatou en mode…
  - Jérôme, les yeux dans le bleu
  - L'enfant de la forêt
  - Les nouveaux éclaireurs
  - Les terroirs de Fred Chesneau
  - Voyages au bout de l'effort

=== Magazine ===
- Clique
- En aparte

=== Entertainment ===
- Déambulations
- Hot Ones
- Jamel Comedy Club
- Saturday Night Live
- Spectacle
- Viendez au Groland

== See also ==
- Canal+ S.A., the channel's parent company
- StudioCanal
