= Conditional-access module =

Content decryption key

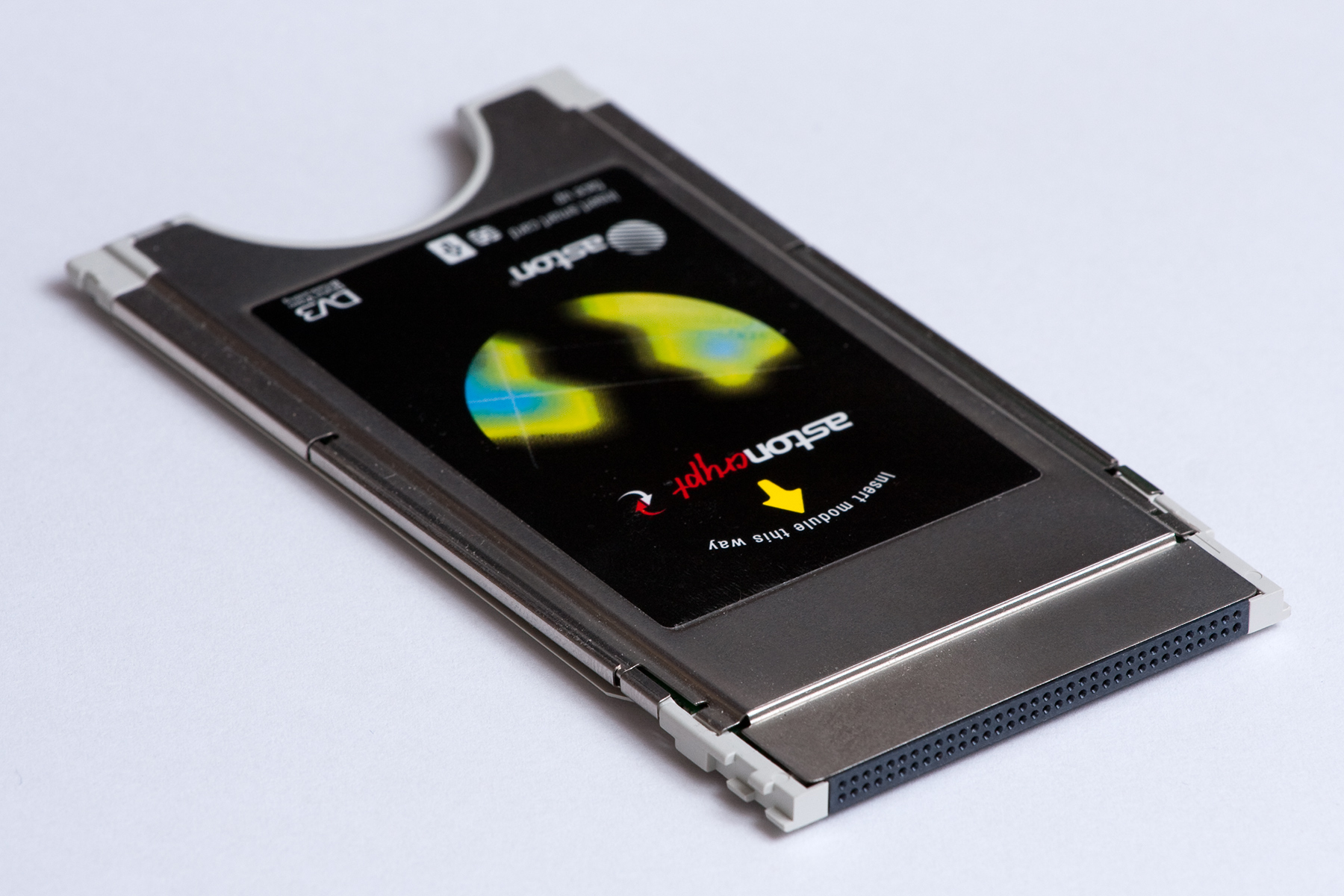
Conditional Access Module

Various types of CAM

A conditional access module (CAM) is an electronic device, usually incorporating a slot for a smart card, which equips an integrated digital television or set-top box with the appropriate hardware facility to view conditional access content that has been encrypted using a conditional access system. They are normally used with direct-broadcast satellite (DBS) services, although digital terrestrial pay TV suppliers also use CAMs. PC Card form factor is used as the Common Interface form of Conditional Access Modules for DVB broadcasts. Major CAM manufacturers are Airmod.tech and SMIT. Airmod, created in 2022, regroup CAM formerly managed by Neotion and SmarDTV.

Some encryption systems for which CAMs are available are Logiways, Nagravision, Viaccess, Mediaguard, Irdeto, KeyFly, Verimatrix, Cryptoworks, Mascom, Safeview, Diablo CAM and Conax. NDS VideoGuard encryption, the preferred choice of Sky Digital can only be externally emulated by a Dragon brand CAM. The NDS CAM that the Sky viewing card ordinarily uses is built into the Sky Digibox and thus not visible. Dragon and Matrix, two popular cams with satellite television enthusiasts are Multicrypt meaning each is capable of handling more than one encryption system. Matrix CAMs can be upgraded via the PC Card port in a laptop personal computer whereas a Dragon cam update is done via separate programmer hardware. Although not officially supported or acknowledged, Multicrypt and programmable modules are a grey market in the pay-TV industry.

The primary purpose of the CAM is to derive control words, which are short-term decryption keys for video. The effectiveness of a CAM depends on the tamper resistance of the hardware; if the hardware is broken, the functionality of the CAM can be emulated, enabling the content to be decrypted by non-subscribers. CAMs are normally removable so that they can be replaced after the hardware security is breached. Replacement of the CAMs in a system is called a card swap-out.

CAM Modules come in two types: standard, intended for a single TV consumer, and professional, made for an array of televisions connected to a rack of CAMs, like in a hospital or a hotel.

The standard format for a CAM is a PC card which takes a smart card to authenticate, although CAMs with the 'smart card' burnt into memory, known as Cardless CAM, can be found. With the CI+ 2.0 certification came a new USB dongle form factor. In addition, CAM emulators exist for many systems, either providing an interface to allow the use of more than one type of card, or a card not designed for that receiver.

== See also ==
- CableCARD
- Common Interface (CI)
- Conditional access
- Television encryption
