= Cryptoworks =

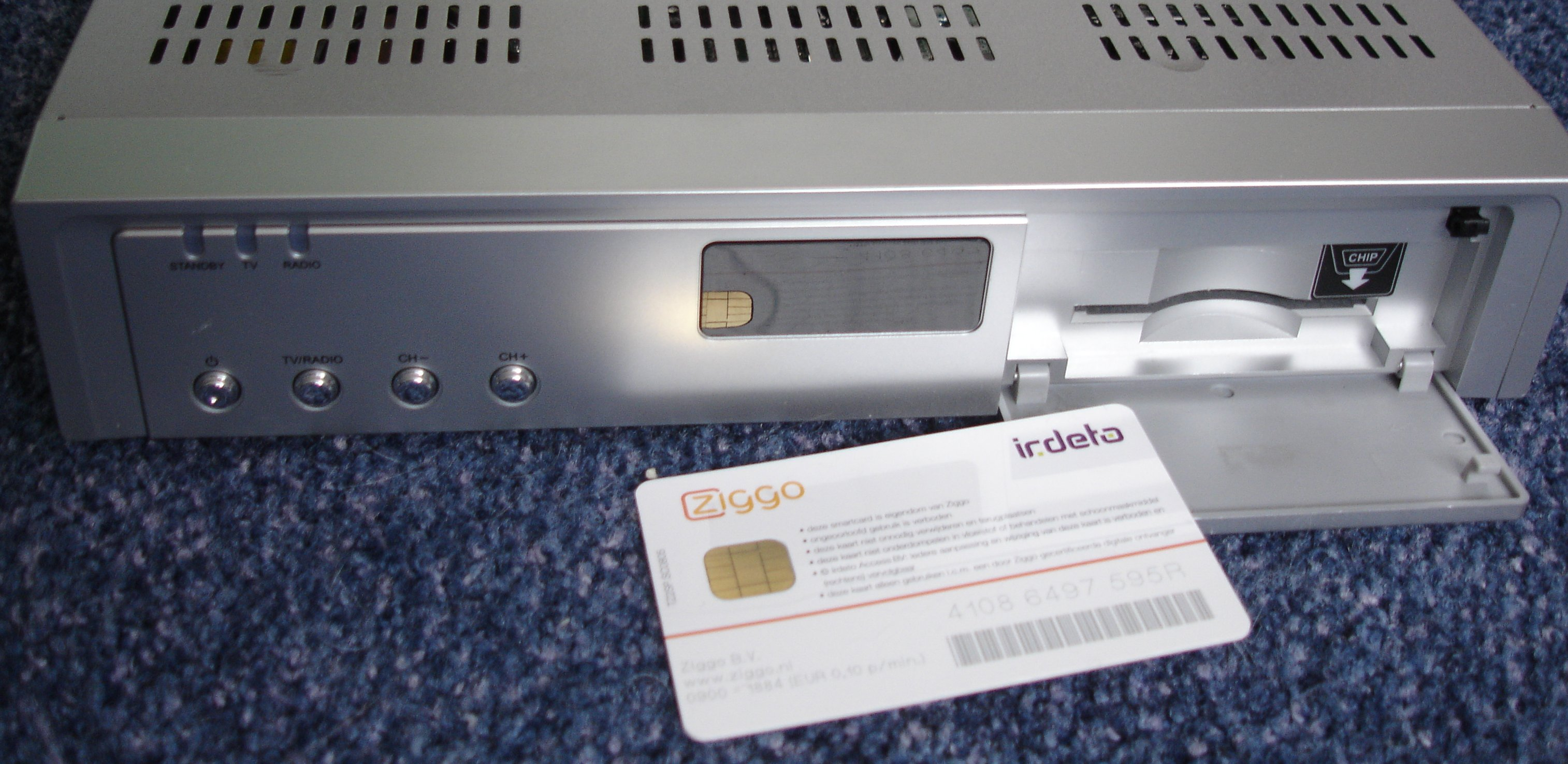
Logo Irdeto, decoder (Humax) and smartcard (Ziggo NL)

In television encryption, Cryptoworks is a DVB conditional access system, developed by Philips CryptoTec but now belonging to Irdeto.

Cryptoworks is used by the following pay TV providers:

- OSN
- Digiturk (before 2011)
- the BFBS satellite service
- UPC Direct
- ITV Partner
- ORF
- Skylink
- JSTV
- Ziggo

It is also used to encrypt some feeds to cable television head-ends.

In 2006, Cryptoworks was transferred to Irdeto.

Other conditional access systems include Irdeto, VideoGuard, Nagravision, Mediaguard
