= KeyFly =

Conditional access system

KeyFly is a conditional access (CA) system developed by SIDSA which is compatible with the DVB-CSA platform. The system is based on SIDSA MACtsp processors, and conditional-access modules for it can integrate the card directly into the CAM.

== Overview ==
KeyFly is a platform for digital television. In addition to offering security as a CA system, it is a platform that allows new sources of revenues for pay-TV or free TV operators. The platform has been created to meet new requirements and challenges of digital television, going further than traditional subscription payment systems, incorporating more flexible business models with no need for permanent subscriptions, value-added services to free TV, as well as new payment techniques via mobile phones. KeyFly allows different options such as with or without smart card, CAS embedded into set-top box or into Common Interface CAMs, with or without need for subscription. KeyFly supports different methods for rights management from traditional pay-TV Systems to Free TV with new value-added services.

== Subscription models ==
KeyFly provides for impulse-purchase of pay-per-view events or subscription periods, which can be paid for via SMS or the internet. Subscription types cover simple time-based subscriptions to renewable subscription models where the content is requested via mobile phone or internet.

== Users ==
- Al Jazeera Sports use KeyFly as one of two simulcrypted encryption services on their European broadcasts
- A number of channels on Hotbird including InXtc, 247 Sex TV, Sex Asians and SuperSex TV use KeyFly as one of their encryption formats.
- TVE on Hispasat also use this type of encryption.
