= Free-to-view =

Free-of-charge but encrypted audiovisual transmissions

Free-to-view (FTV) is a term used for audiovisual transmissions that are provided free without any form of continual subscription. It differs from free-to-air (FTA) in that the program is encrypted.

== Free-to-view vs. free-to-air ==
The free-to-view system contrasts with free-to-air (FTA), in which signals are transmitted in the clear, without encryption, and can be received by anyone with a suitable receiving dish antenna and DVB-compliant receiver (although these services can include proprietary encrypted data services such as an EPG that is only available to reception equipment made for, or authorised by, the FTA broadcaster). Free-to-view services are broadcast encrypted and can only be viewed with reception equipment that includes a suitable conditional-access module and viewing card, in the same way as a pay-TV satellite service. However, the FTV service viewing card is not subject to a continuing subscription payment for viewing the service's channels and may be available for a regular fee, a one-off payment or even for free.

Services which charge a regular fee for reception can still be considered free-to-view, and not pay-TV if the fee is not for the programming content but for the delivery. For example, the HD+ service in Germany, which broadcasts HD versions of channels which are also available free-to-air in standard definition, defended its service fee saying it "is related to the reception of the offer and not to specific content, parts or packages of the offer".

== Commercial restrictions and targeting ==
The free-to-view system allows for restricting access based on location of the viewer. For example, in the UK prior to the launch of Astra 2D, UK channels broadcasting from the Astra 28.2°E satellites used a wide beam and could be received across Europe on small dishes. Those channels which were non-subscription but aimed at the UK only, or restricted from broadcasting outside the UK by way of programme rights (such as Channel 5) or governance (such as the BBC channels), were broadcast encrypted using Videoguard (as used by Sky (UK) for its pay-TV services) with viewing cards made available to UK residents only.

The launch of Astra 2D with a broadcast beam narrowly aimed only at the UK and Ireland enabled UK channels to switch from broadcasting free-to-view to free-to-air, while maintaining their UK exclusivity. The decline of UK free-to-view in favour of narrow-beamed free-to-air has been gradual:

- The BBC's eight digital channels were encrypted under the scheme from their launch on digital satellite until 14 July 2003, when they became free-to-air.
- Shortly after this, ITV stated its intentions to go free-to-air eventually, and launched their newest channel, ITV3, in the clear on 1 November 2004.
- This was followed up by ITV moving its Men & Motors channel to FTA in July 2005.
- This gradual conversion was completed on 1 November 2005, with ITV1 and ITV2 going FTA. ITV's latest channel, ITV4, was launched at the same time, also as a free-to-air service. All the BBC and ITV channels at this time could be viewed FTA without any subscription or purchase from Sky.
- However, in June 2008, some ITV regional channels were encrypted again due to one of their narrow beam transponder agreements ending.
- In April, 2011, high definition Channel 4 HD moved from being a free-to-view channel to a free-to-air channel (when moving to a transponder on Eurobird).
- 1 December 2011, 5USA, 5USA+1, 5* and 5*+1 became free-to-air after moving to Astra 1N.
- 6 June 2012, Pick TV and Pick TV +1 became free-to-air.
- During October 2012, the final free-to-view regions of ITV1, ITV1 +1 and ITV1 HD became free-to-air.
- 25 March 2013, Viva went free-to-air.
- 28 October 2013, Channel 5 HD switched from free-to-view became a subscription channel on the Sky digital satellite platform and is no longer a channel.
- LFC TV switched from free-to-view to Sky subscription only.
- 7 February 2017, 4Music became free-to-air, although it reverted to being free-to-view on 12 December 2018, but later became free-to-air again on 1 February 2022.

The remaining channel aimed exclusively at the UK that use the Astra satellites at 28.2°E with a Europe-wide beam and remain free-to-view and encrypted is regions STV HD (Dundee & Edinburgh), London TV and they can be viewed with a Sky Videoguard receiver and a Sky viewing card, either an inactive former Sky pay-TV card or one for the Freesat from Sky package, bought for a one-off fee.

== Free-to-view networks ==
- Japanese television

All television broadcasts in Japan, with the exception of 1seg mobile television, are broadcast encrypted and require a B-CAS card for reception, which comes included with most televisions and tuner boxes. This applies to both terrestrial and satellite broadcasters. The B-CAS card can also be used for authentication with pay-TV providers.

- Freesat from Sky

A UK satellite service from Sky (UK) that offerred 240 free-to-air and free-to-view TV channels and the Sky EPG, with a one-off payment for a Sky receiver, dish, installation and viewing card.

- Freesat from Everyone TV

A UK satellite service from Everyone TV offering 170 free-to-air and free-to-view TV channels and the EPG, with a one-off payment for a receiver, dish, installation and viewing card.

- HD+

A package of 21 high definition digital satellite TV channels for German-speaking viewers and a subsidiary company of satellite owner SES, with a monthly or annual fee for the viewing card.

- Viewer Access Satellite Television

Australian satellite television platform providing digital TV and radio services to remote and rural areas, and terrestrial black spots. VAST is partly funded by the Australian Government and requires a certified set-top box and viewing card.

- Fransat

A package of mostly HD channels broadcast to residents of France who cannot receive the digital terrestrial TV channels. Can be received all over Europe on Eutelsat 5WA, historical position for French free TV. Viewing card does not expire.

- Tivùsat

Italian package of 68 free-to-air and free-to-view satellite channels for viewers unable to receive them on national terrestrial TV networks. Requires a Nagravision receiver and viewing card.

- TNTSAT

Same as Fransat, TNTSAT broadcasts the all-HD channels from French free digital terrestrial television. TNTSAT is issued by Canal + group on its main position, Astra 1. Viewing card has to be renewed every four years. TNTSAT compatible equipment is also compatible with CANALSAT pay TV.

- Tricolor TV

Russian satellite TV service partly operating within the free-to-view model.

- SAT HD Regional

A Brazilian satellite TV service from Grupo Globo and Claro Brasil. Can be received all over Brazil on Star One D2.

- Nova Parabólica

A Brazilian satellite TV service from SKY Brasil. Can be received all over Brazil on Sky Brasil-1 (also called Intelsat 32e).

- MagicTV

A Chilean satellite TV service from Ríos y Compañía SpA.. Can be received all over Chile on Hispasat 74W-1.

- TDT Complementar

Portuguese satellite TV service from MEO for viewers unable to receive them on national terrestrial TV networks. Requires a Nagravision receiver and viewing card. Can be received all over Portugal on Hispasat 30W-5 (also called Hispasat 1E).

== See also ==
- Free TV Alliance – European organisation promoting free-to-air and free-to-view TV
