= TV/COM International =

TV/COM International is a company that developed the Compression NetWORKS digital broadcasting system. The system later evolved into the DVB-S standard for digital satellite broadcasting. It was used by the short-lived AlphaStar satellite platform for content delivery and conditional access. TV/COM was formed from the former Oak Communications in San Diego to develop its Compression NetWORKS system. The company was bought by Hyundai in 1994 and became a wholly owned subsidiary of Hyundai. It was eventually closed and its intellectual property sold to Irdeto in The Netherlands.

== See also ==
- Conditional access
- AlphaStar (satellite broadcasting service)
- EchoStar
- Satellite television
