= Free TV Alliance =

Digital satellite television broadcasters' collaboration

Logo of the Free TV Alliance

The Free TV Alliance is a collaboration between the four major European free digital satellite television broadcasters to promote free satellite TV and the technology used in its broadcasts and reception.

The aims of the alliance are 'to promote the harmonisation of satellite TV services and technology across Europe' to support the growth of free TV services in Europe and to make the manufacturer of reception equipment easier and cheaper. In particular the Free TV Alliance intends to establish 'common service approaches, open source specifications and preferred technologies that work across all products in all markets'.

== Members ==
The Free TV Alliance is made up of the four main European free-to-air and free-to-view satellite broadcasters.

- Freesat

The free-to-air digital satellite television joint venture between the BBC and ITV plc to serve the United Kingdom. Formed in 2007, Freesat broadcasts in SD and HD from the Astra 28.2°E position.

- HD+

The free-to-view package of high-definition digital satellite TV channels for German-speaking viewers owned by SES. Founded in 2009, HD+ broadcasts from the Astra 19.2°E position.

- Fransat

The free-to-view package of SD and HD channels broadcast to residents of France who cannot receive the digital terrestrial TV channels. Fransat broadcasts from the Eutelsat 5 West A satellite.

- Tivù Sat

A package of free-to-air and free-to-view Italian-language channels available on national TV networks, owned by a consortium of Italian communications companies including RAI. Formed in 2009, Tivù Sat broadcasts from the Eutelsat Hot Bird satellites.

== History ==
The formation of the Free TV Alliance was announced at the 2014 IBC broadcasting show in Amsterdam on September 12, 2014 as a partnership between Freesat, Fransat and Tivù Sat. Germany's HD+ was slated to be a founding member but was not included at this time.

HD+ announced that it had joined the Free TV Alliance on October 29, 2014.

In March 2015, the Free TV Alliance issued its first suite of technical specifications, offering a common way for an operator’s mobile app to control the TV viewing experience on the TV screen, aimed at harmonising the technology across Europe and removing complexities for equipment manufacturers.

== FTA and FTV ==
Free satellite TV services (i.e. not pay-TV) in Europe take the form of either free-to-air (FTA) or free-to-view (FTV) broadcasts. Free-to-air services are transmitted in the clear without encryption and can be received by anyone with a suitable receiving dish antenna and DVB-compliant receiver. These services can include proprietary data services such as an EPG that is only available to reception equipment made for, or authorised by, the FTA broadcaster. Free-to-view services are broadcast encrypted and can only be viewed with reception equipment that includes a suitable conditional-access module and viewing card, in the same way as a pay-TV satellite service. However, the FTV service viewing card is usually a means to restrict access to the service to a specific geographic area or to pay for the delivery of the platform as a whole and not to authorise viewing of individual channels or packages of channels, and may be made available for a regular fee, a one-off payment or even for free.

HD+, in particular, has come in for criticism for describing itself as Free-to-view and joining the Free TV Alliance because of the service fee charged for its viewing cards. However, that all the HD+ channels are also available free to Sky Deutschland HD subscribers underlines that the HD+ service fee is for the provision of the platform, as explained in 2009 by Ferdinand Kayser, then president and CEO of SES Astra, "The fact that a free TV channel, financed by advertising or public fees, is encrypted, does not mean that it becomes a pay-TV channel. Cable TV, for example, is also not pay-TV just because the access to the cable costs money. The same applies to public TV for which you have to pay a [licence] fee. And the same principle applies to HD+: the annual cost ... is a service fee ... which is related to the reception of the offer and not to specific content, parts or packages of the offer.”

== See also ==
- Freesat free satellite TV service
- HD+ free satellite TV service
- tivùsat free satellite TV service
