= Tee-Comm Electronics =

Canadian satellite television equipment manufacturer

Tee-Comm Electronics was a Canadian satellite television equipment manufacturer that founded the AlphaStar and co-founded the Bell Satellite TV satellite direct-to-home television services.

It produced components for both pay phones and satellite television systems. It wholly owned AlphaStar and operated it from 1994 through 1996 after which the company ceased operating as a business.

== See also ==
- DirecTV
- DVB-S
