= DTV receiver =

A USB digital TV receiver with its antenna

A DTV receiver is a set-top box that permits the reception of digital television. Its components are very similar to a desktop PC. The DTV receiver is a vital link in the chain of television system. The goal of a broadcasting system is to concentrate the hardware requirements at the source to simplify the receivers and makes it as inexpensive as possible.

It is usually connected to the TV set or incorporated in the TV set. The main features of a DTV receiver may be classified as follows:

- decodes the incoming digital signal;
- verifies access rights and security levels;
- displays cinema quality pictures on the TV set;
- outputs digital surround sound;
- processes and renders Internet and interactive TV services.

== Overview ==
The tuner in the box receives a digital signal from a cable, a satellite, or terrestrial network and isolates a particular channel. The signal is then forwarded to a demodulator and converted to binary format. Once in binary format, the demodulator will check for error and forward the binary signal to a demultiplexer that will extract audio, video, and data from the binary stream. Once the demultiplexer has finished with the signal, the decoders will transform the digital bits into a format suitable for viewing on the television set.

As the architecture of a DTV receiver can vary in function of the network operator or the set-box manufacturer, we have chosen to divide the physical components into the following categories:

- system board,
- tuner,
- modulator and demodulator,
- demultiplexer and decryptor,
- decoders,
- graphics processor,
- CPU and memory,
- storage devices,
- physical interfaces,
- physical characteristics.

== Architecture ==
=== System board ===
All the main hardware components of the receiver are connected to the system board. Buses are used to carry the digital TV information between the hardware components.

=== DTV Tuner ===
The ATSC tuner module is available for accessing QAM-, OFDM, and QPSK-based networks. In addition to receiving inputs from digital networks, most tuners are also capable of tuning analog broadcasts. Tuners can be divided into three broad categories:

- Broadcast In-band (IB) Tuner. Once the signal arrives from the physical transmission media, the IB tuner will isolate a physical from a multiplex of channels and convert to baseband. The term baseband is used to describe a single channel or digital signal, extracted from broadband signal which is a stream of multiple channels.
- Out Of Band (OOB) Tuner. This type of tuner facilitates the transfer of data between the head-end systems and the set-box. They are widely used in cable set-top boxes for providing subscribers with a medley of interactive services. Implementations of the OOB tuner tend to operate within 100 to 350 MHz frequency band.
- Return Path Tuner. This tuner allows a subscriber to activate the return of path and send data back to the interactive services provider. Implementations of this tuner tend to operate within the 5 to 60 MHz frequency band.

=== Modulator and demodulator ===
The function of the demodulator is to convert the analog signal to a digital bitstream. Then, it checks for errors and forward the bitstream to the demultiplexer. The modulator reverses the actions of a demodulator and its function is to deliver a signal to the return path tuner.

=== Demultiplexer and decryptor ===
The technology used in DTV television is MPEG-2. The demultiplexer selects particular packets, decrypts, and forwards to a specific decoder.

=== Decoders ===
A DTV receiver will normally contain three separate decoders for converting the digital bit-stream back into a format that can be heard and viewed by the subscriber.

A video decoder It transforms video packets into a sequence of pictures, which are displayed by the TV monitor. An audio decoder It decompresses the audio bit-stream. Different audio modes are usually supported by the DTV receiver: mono and dual channel, stereo, and joint stereo. A data decoder.

Graphics Processor

The main purpose of a graphics processor is to render a range of Internet file formats and proprietary interactive TV file formats.

=== Central processing unit ===
The CPU, like in a desktop PC, is the brain of the DTV receiver. Functions provided by a CPU include:

- initializes the various hardware components;
- processes a range of Internet and interactive TV applications;
- monitors and manages hardware interrupts;
- fetches data and instructions from memory;
- runs various programs.

=== Memory ===
As a computer, a DTV receiver needs memory to store and manipulates instructions. Most elements within the receiver require memory to perform various tasks: The graphics engine, video decoder...

== See also ==
- Analog television
- ATSC standards
- Broadcast television systems
- Common Interface
- Digital radio including digital television broadcasting
- Digital Video Broadcasting
- Digital Video Broadcasting - Terrestrial
- DMB-T/H, China's digital television standard
- Digital terrestrial television (DTT or DTTV)
- High-definition television
- Interactive television
