= JSTV =

Japanese international broadcaster

- Industry: Satellite broadcasting
- Headquarters: 65 Clifton Street, London, EC2A 4JE, United Kingdom
- Area served: Europe and Middle East
- Owner: NHK Cosmomedia (Europe) Limited

Japan Satellite Television (JSTV) (日本語衛星放送, ジャパンサテライトテレビ, Nihongo Eisei Hōsō) was a Japanese television broadcasting company serving viewers in Europe, the Middle East, and North Africa. Launched in March 1990 and broadcasting from London, it carried the programming from the NHK World Premium service in the regions served.

== History ==
JSTV was set up in early 1990 by Marubeni-Iida in association with the Mitsukoshi department store chain. Test broadcasts were slated for a 15 February launch and were set to commence regular broadcasts on 1 March. The service was initially going to be free-to-air, eyeing for an encryption in 1991, when the channel would switch to a subscription system (£10 per month).

The channel initially broadcast for two hours each night from 8pm (GMT) on the Lifestyle transponder 5 on the Astra 1A satellite in analogue format (frequency 11.273 MHz, time-sharing with The Children's Channel, Lifestyle and The Lifestyle Satellite Jukebox). Later on 3 June 1991, it started using transponder 24 on Astra 1B, at frequency 11.567 MHz for 11 hours a day, using the Videocrypt II encryption (time-sharing with The Children's Channel and later with CMT Europe). It eventually moved to transponder 53 (frequency 10.773) to broadcast 24 hours a day. Analogue transmissions for JSTV on Astra ceased on 31 October 2001.

At the beginning of fiscal 1997, it started airing NHK World's Dayline Japan.

At the time of closure, JSTV broadcast in DVB-S on Eutelsat Hotbird 13G, encrypted in Conax, except some programmes, and broadcasts programs of NHK (mostly sourced from NHK World Premium), as well as selected programs from Fuji TV, TV Tokyo and other main Japanese broadcasters. News programs are mostly direct and live from the original broadcaster, however several other programs such as anime and variety shows are not up to date. Not all programs were encrypted; NHK News 7, News Watch 9 and some English programs were broadcast free-to-air.

JSTV operated two channels: JSTV1 which broadcasts TV programmes approximately 20 hours a day and JSTV2 which broadcasts TV programmes 24 hours a day.

In July 2020, JSTV started HD broadcasts of its two channels. The cause was that because of Brexit, JSTV changed its satellite parameters and changed its uplink partner to Italian company Telespazio.

On May 16, 2023, NHK Cosmomedia (Europe) announced on its website that it plans to shut down the JSTV service at the end of October 2023. They cited "a decline in the number of subscribing households and changes in the environment surrounding broadcasting" as key factors in the decision. For September and October, as part of a transitional measure, JSTV1 relayed NHK World Premium on an eight-hour delay and JSTV2, the same but live until the closure of the channels. Following the closure, NHK World Premium replaced JSTV.

== Stockholders ==
- NHK Enterprise, Inc.
- Marubeni Corporation Plc
- Mizuho Corporate Bank, Ltd.
- All Nippon Airways, Co. Ltd
- Mitsukoshi UK, Ltd.
- NHK Global Media Services, Inc.

== Encryption & Availability ==
- Satellite

DVB-S2 MPEG-4: Hot Bird 13G (11179 MHz, horizontal, 3/4, VPID 901, APID 902/903) Encrypted (Conax). Cryptoworks encryption was discontinued on 30 September 2019.

Analogue: ASTRA [Closed down on 31 October 2001]

- Hotels

JSTV broadcast in several hotels in Europe and the Middle East, complete list available on NHK's English page "Overseas hotels carrying NHK"

- JSTV-i

JSTV is available through "JSTV-i" to European consumers via Western Digital's WD TV LIVE STB.

== Channels ==
JSTV
- Country: United Kingdom
- Broadcast area: Europe, Middle East, CIS and North Africa

Programming
- Language: Japanese
- Picture format: 16:9, 576i (SDTV)

Ownership
- Owner: NHK Cosmomedia (Europe) Limited

History
- Launched: March 1990
- Closed: August 31, 2023 (end of relays of commercial TV content); October 31, 2023 (end of two-month period of NHK World Premium relays and definitive end of service)
- Replaced by: NHK World Premium

JSTV 1: TV programmes

JSTV 2: Radio programmes (NHK World Radio Japan) and JSTV 1 TV Schedule on screen.
(Since 31 March 2008 JSTV 2 broadcast TV programmes from 1700 UK time to 2200 UK time 7 days a week, and from 1 April 2009 now broadcasts TV Programmes from 0500 to 1000 and then 1500 to 2200 UK time)

== Programmes ==
Dual language News (Japanese & English)

- NHK News 7
- NHK Newswatch 9
- Global Debate WISDOM
- Sumo

News

- NHK/BS NEWS
- Good Morning, Japan
- Sunday Sports News
- FNN Speak
- FNN Super News
- NHK Newswatch 9
- Today's Close-up

Variety

- Hello from Studio Park (スタジオパークからこんにちは) NHK
- Riddles on Mobile (着信御礼！ケータイ大喜利) NHK
- VS Arashi (VS嵐) Fuji TV
- Shoten (笑点) NTV
- Why did you come to Japan? (Youは何しに日本へ？) TV Tokyo
- Peke X Pon (ペケXポン) Fuji TV

Documentary

- NHK Special (NHKスペシャル)NHK
- The Professionals (プロフェッショナル仕事の流儀)NHK
- Document 72hours (ドキュメント72時間) NHK

Anime

- Ace of Diamond (ダイヤのA)
- Keroro (ケロロ軍曹)
- Chibi Maruko-chan (ちびまる子ちゃん)

Kids

- Grand Whiz-Kids TV (大！天才てれびくん)
- Okaasan to Issho (With Mother おかあさんといっしょ)
- Inai Inai Baa! (いないいないばあっ!)
- Play Japanese (にほんごであそぼ)
- Play English (えいごであそぼ)

== Related Channels ==
- NHK World Premium
- NHK World Premium Australia
