= Conditional access =

System used to prevent non-paying customers from accessing content that requires payment

Conditional access (CA) is a term commonly used in relation to software and to digital television systems. Conditional access is an evaluation to ensure the person who is seeking access to content is authorized to access the content. Access is managed by requiring certain criteria to be met before granting access to the content.

== In software ==
Conditional access is a function that lets an organization manage people's access to the software in question, such as email, applications, and documents. It is usually offered as SaaS (Software-as-a-Service) and deployed in organizations to keep company data safe. By setting conditions on the access to this data, the organization has more control over who accesses the data and where and in what way the information is accessed.

When setting up conditional access, access can be limited to or prevented based on the policy defined by the system administrator. For example, a policy might require that access is available from certain networks, or access is blocked when a specific web browser is requesting the access.

== In digital television ==
Under the Digital Video Broadcasting (DVB) standard, conditional access system (CAS) standards are defined in the specification documents for DVB-CA (conditional access), DVB-CSA (the common scrambling algorithm) and DVB-CI (the Common Interface). These standards define a method by which one can obfuscate a digital-television stream, with access provided only to those with valid decryption smart-cards. The DVB specifications for conditional access are available from the standards page on the DVB website.

Conditional access is achieved by a combination of scrambling and encryption. The data stream is scrambled with a 48-bit secret key, called the control word. Knowing the value of the control word at a given moment is of relatively little value, as under normal conditions, content providers will change the control word several times per minute. The control word is generated automatically in such a way that successive values are not usually predictable; the DVB specification recommends using a physical randomness process for that.

In order for the receiver to unscramble the data stream, it must be permanently informed about the current value of the control word. In practice, it must be informed slightly in advance, so that no viewing interruption occurs. Encryption is used to protect the control word during transmission to the receiver: the control word is encrypted as an entitlement control message (ECM). The CA subsystem in the receiver will decrypt the control word only when authorised to do so; that authority is sent to the receiver in the form of an entitlement management message (EMM). The EMMs are specific to each subscriber, as identified by the smart card in his receiver, or to groups of subscribers, and are issued much less frequently than ECMs, usually at monthly intervals. This being apparently not sufficient to prevent unauthorized viewing, TPS has lowered this interval down to about 12 minutes. This can be different for every provider, BSkyB uses a term of 6 weeks. When Nagravision 2 was hacked, Digital+ started sending a new EMM every three days to make unauthorized viewing more cumbersome.

The contents of ECMs and EMMs are not standardized and as such they depend on the conditional access system being used.

The control word can be transmitted through different ECMs at once. This allows the use of several conditional access systems at the same time, a DVB feature called simulcrypt, which saves bandwidth and encourages multiplex operators to cooperate. DVB Simulcrypt is widespread in Europe; some channels, like the CNN International Europe from the Hot Bird satellites, can use seven different CA systems in parallel.

The decryption cards are read, and sometimes updated with specific access rights, either through a conditional-access module (CAM), a PC card-format card reader meeting DVB-CI standards, or through a built-in ISO/IEC 7816 card reader, such as that in the Sky Digibox.

Several companies provide competing CA systems; ABV, VideoGuard, Irdeto, Nagravision, Conax, Viaccess, Synamedia, Mediaguard (a.k.a. SECA) are among the most commonly used CA systems.

Due to the common usage of CA in DVB systems, many tools to aid in or even directly circumvent encryption exist. CAM emulators and multiple-format CAMs exist which can either read several card formats or even directly decrypt a compromised encryption scheme. Most multiple format CAMs and all CAMs that directly decrypt a signal are based on reverse engineering of the CA systems. A large proportion of the systems currently in use for DVB encryption have been opened to full decryption at some point, including Nagravision, Conax, Viaccess, Mediaguard (v1) as well as the first version of VideoGuard.

=== Conditional access in North America ===
In Canada and the United States, the standard for conditional access is provided with CableCARDs whose specification was developed by the cable company consortium CableLabs.

Cable companies in the United States are required by the Federal Communications Commission to support CableCARDs. Standards exist for two-way communication (M-card), but satellite television has separate standards. Next-generation approaches in the United States eschew such physical cards and employ schemes using downloadable software for conditional access such as DCAS.

The main appeal of such approaches is that the access control may be upgraded dynamically in response to security breaches without requiring expensive exchanges of physical conditional-access modules.

=== Conditional access systems ===
Conditional access systems include:

==== Analog systems ====
- EuroCrypt
- Nagravision
- Videocipher
- VideoCrypt

==== Digital systems ====
CA ID	Name	Developed by	Introduced (year)	Security	Notes
0x4AEB	Abel Quintic	Abel DRM Systems	2009	Secure	
0x4A64, 0x4AF0, 0x4AF2, 0x4B4B, 0x4B4C	ABV CAS	ABV International Pte. Ltd	2006	Secure (Farncombe Certified)	CA, DRM, Middleware & Turnkey Solution Provider For DTH, DVBT/T2, DVBC, OTT, IPTV, VOD, Catchup TV, Audience Measurement System, EAD etc.
0x4AFC	Panaccess	Panaccess Systems GmbH	2010	Secure (Farncombe Certified)	CA for DVB-S/S2, DVB-T/T2, DVB-C, DVB-IP, OTT, VOD, Catchup etc.
0x4B19	RCAS or RIDSYS cas	RIDSYS, INDIA	2012	Secure	CA for DVB-C, IPTV, OTT, VOD, Catchup etc.
0x4B30, 0x4B31	ViCAS	Vietnam Multimedia Corporation (VTC)	Unknown	Secure (Farncombe Certified)	
0x4800	Accessgate	Telemann	Unknown		
0x4A20	AlphaCrypt	AlphaCrypt	Unknown		
N/A	B-CAS ARIB STD-B25 (Multi-2)	Association of Radio Industries and Businesses (ARIB)	2000		CA for ISDB. Used in Japan only
0x1702, 0x1722, 0x1762	reserved for various non-BetaResearch CA systems	Formally owned by BetaTechnik/Beta Research (subsidiary of KirchMedia). Handed over to TV operators to handle with their CA systems.	Unknown		
0x1700 – 0x1701, 0x1703 – 0x1721, 0x1723 – 0x1761, 0x1763 – 0x17ff, 0x5601 – 0x5604	VCAS DVB	Verimatrix Inc.	2010		
0x2600 0x2610	BISS BISS-E	European Broadcasting Union	2002 2018	Compromised, BISS-E secure	
0x27A0-0x27A4	ICAS (Indian CAS)	ByDesign India Private Limited	2015	Advanced Embedded Secure	
0x4900	China Crypt	CrytoWorks (China) (Irdeto)	Unknown		
0x22F0	Codicrypt	Scopus Network Technologies (now part of Harmonic)	Unknown	Secure	
0x4AEA	Cryptoguard	Cryptoguard AB	2008	Secure	
0x0B00	Conax Contego	Conax AS	Unknown	Secure	
0x0B00	Conax CAS 5	Conax AS	Unknown	Compromised	Pirate cards has existed
0x0B00	Conax CAS 7.5	Conax AS	Unknown	Secure	
0x0B00, 0x0B01, 0x0B02, 0x0BAA	Conax CAS 7	Conax AS	Unknown	Compromised	Cardsharing
0x0B01, 0x0B02, 0x0B03, 0x0B04, 0x0B05, 0x0B06, 0x0B07	Conax CAS 3	Conax AS	Unknown	Compromised	Pirate cards has existed
0x4AE4	CoreCrypt	CoreTrust(Korea)	2000	S/W & H/W Security	CA for IPTV, Satellite, Cable TV and Mobile TV
0x4347	CryptOn	CryptOn	Unknown		
0x0D00, 0x0D02, 0x0D03, 0x0D05, 0x0D07, 0x0D20	Cryptoworks	Philips CryptoTec	Unknown	Partly compromised (older smartcards)	
0x4ABF	CTI-CAS	Beijing Compunicate Technology Inc.	Unknown		
0x0700	DigiCipher and DigiCipher II	Jerrold/GI/Motorola 4DTV	1997	Compromised	DVB-S2 compatible, used for retail BUD dish service and for commercial operations as source programming for cable operators. Despite the Programming Center shutting down its consumer usage of DigiCipher 2 (as 4DTV) on August 24, 2016, it is still being used for cable headends across the United States, as well as on Shaw Direct in Canada.
0x4A70	DreamCrypt	Dream Multimedia	2004		Proposed conditional access system used for Dreambox receivers.
0x4A10	EasyCas	Easycas	Unknown		
0x2719,0xEAD0	InCrypt Cas	S-Curious Research & Technology Pvt. Ltd., Equality Consultancy Services	Unknown		
0x0464	EuroDec	Eurodec	Unknown		
0x5448,0x6448	Gospell VisionCrypt	GOSPELL DIGITAL TECHNOLOGY CO., LTD.	Unknown	Secure	
0x5501	Griffin	Nucleus Systems, Ltd.	Unknown		
0x5581	Bulcrypt	Bulcrypt	2009		Used in Bulgaria and Serbia
0x0606	Irdeto 1	Irdeto	1995	Compromised (Cardsharing and MOSC available)	
0x0602, 0x0604, 0x0606, 0x0608, 0x0622, 0x0626, 0x0664, 0x0614	Irdeto 2	Irdeto	2000	Compromised (Cardsharing and MOSC available)	
0x0624, 0x0648, 0x0650, 0x0639	Irdeto 3	Irdeto	2010	Compromised (Cardsharing available)	
0x0692, 0x06A4, 0x06B6, 0x069F, 0x06AB, 0x06F1	Irdeto Cloaked	Irdeto	Unknown	Secure	
0x4AA1	KeyFly	SIDSA	2006	Partly compromised (v. 1.0)	
0x0100	Seca Mediaguard 1	SECA	1995	Compromised	
0x0100	Seca Mediaguard 2 (v1+)	SECA	2002	Partly compromised (MOSC available)	
0x0100	Seca Mediaguard 3	SECA	2008		
0x1800, 0x1801, 0x1810, 0x1830	Nagravision	Nagravision	2003	Compromised	
0x1801	Nagravision Carmageddon	Nagravision	Unknown	Compromised	Combination of Nagravision with BetaCrypt
0x1702, 0x1722, 0x1762, 0x1801	Nagravision Aladin	Nagravision	Unknown	Compromised	
0x1801	Nagravision 3 - Merlin	Nagravision	2007	Secure	
0x1801	Nagravision - ELK	Nagravision	Circa 2008	Secure	IPTV
0x4A02	Tongfang	Tsinghua Tongfang Company	2007	Secure	
0x4AD4	OmniCrypt	Widevine Technologies	2004		
0x0E00	PowerVu	Scientific Atlanta	1998	Compromised	Professional system widely used by cable operators for source programming
0x0E00	PowerVu+	Scientific Atlanta	2009	Compromised	Professional system widely used by cable operators for source programming
0x1000	RAS (Remote Authorisation System)	Tandberg Television	Unknown		Professional system, not intended for consumers.
0x4AC1	Latens Systems	Latens	2002		
0xA101	RosCrypt-M	NIIR	2006		
0x4A60, 0x4A61, 0x4A63	SkyCrypt/Neotioncrypt/Neotion SHL	AtSky/Neotion	2003		
Unknown	T-crypt	Tecsys	Unknown		
0x4A80	ThalesCrypt	Thales Broadcast & Multimedia	Unknown		Viaccess modification. Was developed after TPS-Crypt was compromised.
0x0500	TPS-Crypt	France Telecom	Unknown	Compromised	Viaccess modification used with Viaccess 2.3
0x0500	Viaccess PC2.3, or Viaccess 1	France Telecom	1996	Compromised	
0x0500	Viaccess PC2.4, or Viaccess 2	France Telecom	2002	Compromised	
0x0500	Viaccess PC2.5, or Viaccess 2	France Telecom	2003	Compromised	
0x0500	Viaccess PC2.6, or Viaccess 3	France Telecom	2005	Compromised	
0x0500	Viaccess PC3.0	France Telecom	2007	Compromised	
0x0500	Viaccess PC4.0	France Telecom	2008	Compromised	
Unknown	Viaccess PC5.0	France Telecom	2011	Secure	
Unknown	Viaccess PC6.0	France Telecom	2015	Secure	
0x0930, 0x0942	Synamedia VideoGuard 1	NDS (now part of Synamedia)	1994	Partly compromised (older smartcards)	
0x0911, 0x0960	Synamedia VideoGuard 2	NDS (now part of Synamedia)	1999	Secure	
0x0919, 0x0961, 0x09AC, 0x09C4, 0x091F, 0x0944, 0x09AA	Synamedia VideoGuard 3	NDS (now part of Synamedia)	2004	Secure	
0x0927, 0x09BF, 0x0910, 0x0913, 0x098C, 0x098D, 0x098E, 0x0911, 0x0950, 0x09BB, 0x0987, 0x0963, 0x093B, 0x09CD	Synamedia VideoGuard 4	NDS (now part of Synamedia)	2009	Secure	
0x56D0	Onnet CA/DRM	Onnet Systems India Pvt. Ltd.	2021	Secure	CA/DRM, IPTV Middleware, OTT, Interactive Services, STB Middleware, AR/VR
0x4AD0, 0x4AD1	X-Crypt	XCrypt Inc.	2010	Secure	
0x4AE0, 0x4AE1, 0x7be1	DRE-Crypt	Cifra	2004	Secure	
Unknown	PHI CAS	RSCRYPTO	2016	Secure	

== See also ==
- Access control, the same principle applied outside of television.
- B-CAS
- CableCARD
- Card sharing
- Compression Networks
- Conditional-access module
- DigiCipher 2
- Digital rights management
- Pirate decryption
- PowerVu
- Smart card
- Television encryption
- Viaccess
- Videocipher
- VideoGuard
- Pairing Smartcard
