= Nagra France =

French conditional access system company

Nagra France is a company which develops and markets the Mediaguard conditional access system for digital television. It is a subsidiary of the Kudelski Group (which also develops Nagravision).

== History ==
Nagra France was previously known as SECA or Société Européenne de Contrôle d'Accès. It was co-owned by Canal+ and Bertelsmann. Canal+ later bought Bertelsmann's parts and created Canal+ Technologies. At end of September 2002, Thomson SA bought parts from Canal+ and became the majority holder with 92% of shares.
