= Integrated digital television =

Television set with a built-in digital tuner

An integrated digital television (IDTV or iDTV) set is a television set with a built in digital tuner, be it for DVB-T2, DVB-S2, DVB-C, DMB-T/H, ATSC standards or ISDB. Most of them also allow reception of analogue signals (PAL, SÉCAM or NTSC). They do away with the need for a set-top box for converting those signals for reception on a television.

Most iDTVs do not inherently include support for pay TV, and as a result many are fitted with common interface slots to allow the use of a conditional-access module. They may also include support for other features of a digital television "platform", such as an interactive television engine and support for some form of return channel. A small number of iDTVs include a digital video recorder, which removes the need for an external PVR, possibly requiring its own digital set-top box.

The particular tuner varies by country. For example, in many European countries such as Germany and Sweden, DVB-C (cable) is the most common digital TV tuner in televisions, whereas in the UK, most televisions have a DVB-T (terrestrial) tuner instead.
