= Freesat from Sky =

British satellite television service

Freesat from Sky (FsfS) was a British satellite television service from Sky UK. It offered over 240 free-to-air (FTA) channels in its EPG. This is a greater number than its competitors, Freesat, which has 200+, and Freeview, which has 70+. It also had up to six HD channels and used to have Sky Active interactive data service. Sky was not actively promoting the service (in favour of its subscription TV offering) and the service has quietly been discontinued for new customers as of 2021.

== Service reach ==
As of April 2011, the number of households with free-to-view satellite television is estimated by Ofcom to be 2.045 million, or 8.0% of households with television. This figure includes households with the BBC/ITV Freesat, Freesat from Sky, and churned Sky subscribers who kept their Sky Digiboxes to access free-to-view channels.

== Reception equipment ==
This service requires use of the proprietary SkyHD or SD set-top box, to receive the FTA channels. Sky's boxes use the proprietary OpenTV EPG for interactive television services. The boxes are limited in some regards when compared to other satellite receivers, such as digital audio, video outputs, and the lack of the ability to use a dish motor and scan for channels not carried on the EPG. They also feature an EPG that contains all Sky channels, including pay-TV services which are not available to non-subscription viewers. Sky currently include a SkyHD Digibox with new FsfS installations. These boxes receive a selection of standard definition and HD channels, but do not record. Those who wish to have Sky+ functionality (recording & time-shifting) must buy their own box, requiring Sky to 'pair' their existing viewing card to the new box. In addition, use of the recording facilities of these PVRs also requires an ongoing monthly fee.

=== Viewing card ===
Freesat from Sky differentiates itself from Freesat not just by its use of Sky equipment but by offering both free-to-air and free-to-view channels. A card is included with installation or can be purchased direct from Sky. For security reasons the viewing cards are deactivated from time to time and reception of the encrypted free-to-view channels disabled. This requires the user to purchase a new viewing card at the current standard charge. Sky viewing cards used to access subscription services revert to acting as FsfS viewing cards upon cancellation of the subscription. The viewing card also ensures the correct region for regionalised services for BBC One, BBC Two, ITV, Channel 4 and S4C.

==== Extra channels ====
The following is a list of free-to-view channels on the FsfS platform. A viewing card is required to watch them. None of these channels are available on Freesat. BT broadband subscribers were able to receive BT Sport using a FsfS viewing card.

- STV HD (North (Dundee/Tayside) and Central East (Edinburgh) regions. The Central West HD, North (Aberdeen) HD and the other two regions in SD are free-to-air.)
- CNN International (since April 2026)

The Local TV and London Live channels were also free-to-view and part of the FsfS platform until being removed from satellite altogether in June 2026.

==== Other features ====
- The viewing card can be used to receive the correct region on the main channel number for the following services:
  - BBC One
  - BBC Two
  - ITV1 / STV / UTV
  - Channel 4 / S4C

== Competition ==
Freesat from Sky (FsfS) is a competitor to the BBC and ITV's Freesat service which also broadcasts from 28.2°E and 28.5°E and the DTT service Freeview. FsfS has five free-to-view channels which are not available on Freesat (see above) and a large number of free-to-air channels which are not directly listed in the Freesat EPG and need manual tuning to receive them.

FsfS has over 240 free-to-air channels on its EPG, (which do not require either a viewing card or a Sky receiver to watch), including Bloomberg Television and the Travel Channel, compared to 198 free-to-air channels on Freesat EPG, with the remaining free-to-air channels not available through the main EPG, and needing manual tuning by the user. Freeview digital terrestrial television has over 50 free-to-air channels but cannot be manually tuned into the free-to-air channels available. FsfS also pre-tunes the boxes to the correct regional services of broadcasters who offer regional services such as the BBC, ITV and Channel 4. which on Freesat requires the user to manually enter their postcode during set-up for these correct regional services.

Conversely, there are some TV channels that are on Freeview but are not on the Sky EPG, including many adult-category services. Most programming is simulcast on adult-category channels on Sky, but with different channel names and broadcast times.
