= Compression Networks =

Digital content delivery system

Compression Networks is a digital content delivery system developed by TV/COM International that evolved into the current DVB-S standard for satellite broadcasting. The system provided MPEG2 video, audio, signalling, enhanced program guide, and conditional access for pay-television services like AlphaStar.

== See also ==
- EchoStar
