= BBC Select (1992–1995) =

Overnight BBC subscription television service

Ownership
- Owner: BBC

History
- Launched: 21 January 1992; 34 years ago
- Closed: 8 October 1995; 31 years ago
- Replaced by: BBC Learning Zone
- Former names: British Medical TV (1988–1990; not direct predecessor)

Availability At time of closure

Terrestrial
- UK Analogue: BBC1; BBC2

BBC Select was an overnight television service run by the BBC during the hours when BBC1 or BBC2 had closed down, usually between 2am and 6am. Launched in 1992 after a series of delays and following the British Medical Television experiment, the channel showed programming intended for specialist audiences, such as businessmen, lawyers, nurses and teachers, and was designed to be viewed after broadcast via a video recording. It was funded by a subscription, and most programming was scrambled.

By 1995, subscription services had ended and it was ultimately replaced with the BBC Learning Zone, which ran for the next 20 years.

== History ==
=== British Medical Television ===
A spiritual predecessor of BBC Select intended for members of the British health care profession, called British Medical TV (BMTV), based in Woking and active in the internal video market for GPs initially producing monthly video tapes as early as 1984, aired encrypted health care-related programming during the overnight hours of BBC1 and 2 between 1988 and 1990.

BBC2 started carrying engineering tests in late 1987; these tests were encrypted as the BBC was eyeing the potential for the launch of a specialist subscription service. These tests were not mentioned in the press, leaving the intent unclear. The BBC and BMTV signed an agreement in 1988 to carry its programming after BBC2's closedown, encrypted using the Discret 12 encryption system. To this end, doctors who were subscribed to BMTV received a direct television recorder to decrypt the scrambled signals and send a signal to the doctor's VCR to start recording. Once the BMTV broadcast finished, the DTR would instruct the doctor to rewind the tape, and play it in the following morning.

The service was launched in February 1988 by HRH The Princess Royal with a tentative launch date set for May 1988. It is unclear when did these broadcasts start, as they weren't listed in the press and on the Radio Times. By December 1988, it had ordered 15,000 decoders manufactured by Philips, expecting to have 50,000 subscribers within two years. In February 1989, approximately 1,200 doctors were subscribed to the service.

Programming consisted of a BMTV News bulletin, followed by instructional programmes provided by entities such as the Royal Society of Medicine and ended with the Stopwatch Datapages – a text service with information of interest to the medical industry, with each section being colour-coded to enable easier recognition, even while fast searching.

The BBC showed confidence in starting a niche subscription service influenced by BMTV. In September 1989, it was announced that Michael Checkland, at the time Director-General of the BBC, would give the corporation a 15% share in BMTV and expanded the existing subscription service, by setting up a subsidiary company.

On 31 January 1990, BMTV made its last broadcast; at closing time, it had 4,000 subscribers, each one paying £90 per year to receive the service. It was dissolved after facing losses of a few million pounds a year. Moreover, encryption problems and the overall failure of the service have cost the BBC £500,000.

=== BBC Select ===
The company that would lead to the creation of BBC Select, BBC Subscription Television Limited, was founded on 1 January 1990, shortly before the shutdown of BMTV; it was already gaining momentum for a subscription service to achieve Checkland's goals. John Radcliffe, head of the planned subscription service, said that, from the experience of the BMTV service, there was a demand for niche subscription television.

In the summer of 1990, ambitious plans were outlined for a seven-channel subscription television service by Spring 1991. There were no plans for mainstream programmes; one of the plans was to dedicate slots to specialist interests such as natural history, and, if possible, a service provided by RTÉ for Irish expats living in the United Kingdom, at the time the UK had 800,000 Irish born citizens. However, the fall of BBC1's ratings demonstrated the opposite, and that niche services weren't able to gain fortunes.

In November 1990, it was announced that the new service was to be called BBC Select, receiving an £8 million investment. The core categories carried by the service were going to be community services, leisure, professional business and educational content. An estimated 30 services were supposed to be housed, but this plan wouldn't become viable until the mid-1990s. Chris Townsend, marketing director of BBC Subscription Television, revealed in February 1991 that the effects of the recession of the time led to a drop in consumer spending, causing the BBC to reconsider the launch of BBC Select to the first half of 1992. In September 1991, engineering tests were carried consisting of encrypted airings of Doctor Who and Blake's 7, which likely served as a testing ground for UK Gold, which launched on 1 November 1992 on satellite. That same month, it was announced that BBC Select had announced its Selector decoder. Internal estimates at the BBC projected 500,000 subscribers by 1996.

The service was officially launched during the overnight hours of 21 January 1992, and ran on both BBC1 and 2. The first programme shown was The Way Ahead, a 12-part series about the new disability allowance.

BBC Select experimented with programming for specific audiences, and with overnight broadcasts, experience that the BBC would later use when broadcasting the BBC Learning Zone. By broadcasting the programming then, it allowed the BBC to broaden their audience, while allowing more time in the day for other programming.

The programming was specifically aimed at the professional services of business, nurses, teachers and lawyers with programming made in-house by the BBC with some programming supplied by other independent companies as part of their remit. An example of this was Thames Television whose film Living with Disabilities, and their series The Way Ahead, both made for the Department of Social Security, were distributed free, on condition that no financial gain be made from it: as a result the programme was broadcast un-encrypted.

Early in BBC Select's run, Quay Subscription Television, who was due to provide Farming Now, had entered liquidation in April 1992 after BBC Worldwide paid an unsecure loan to Quay. Farming Now was postponed to 1993, after which it was never materialised. In March 1992, the Executive Business Club started broadcasting with initial free previews. These previews were initially mooted for BBC2, but were intermittently toggling between it and BBC1, likely due to scheduling issues. The Executive Business Club became encrypted in June 1992, the first such service on BBC Select. Much like BMTV, EBC had also started earlier as a video cassette service, thanks to an agreement between the BBC and Management TV International, EBC's production company.

Corporate companies also took advantage of the service. In 1992 and 1993 Cable & Wireless used BBC Select to broadcast highlights of their annual general meeting (AGM). The first broadcast, of their 1992 AGM, was the first time in the UK that a company AGM had been televised. These highlights were broadcast unencrypted. The Royal College of Nursing started airing unencrypted programmes once a week in June 1992 aiming at nurses.

TV Edits carried language-based specialist programming, encrypted. A preview broadcast was shown in the clear showing the contents of France Panorama, Deutschland Heute and España y las Américas. The concept behind TV Edits was, according to the narration in its free preview, "authentic programme extracts first broadcast on television in France, Germany and Spain", selected each year and grouped into themes. German and Spanish programmes consisted of highlights from documentaries, news reports, interviews and pop videos, as well as television adverts. France Panorama took its own approach; the broadcast in the free preview consisted entirely of themed reports - in the preview's case, health items - supplied from Antenne 2. Accounting Television followed in November 1992 and Legal Network Television launched in February 1993.

BBC Select's finances deteriorated in July 1992, when the service alone had lost £3.2 million. In June 1993 the BBC announced that it will freeze plans for new subscription services during its overnight downtime due to the service not being profitable. The BBC had planned up to 30 programmes but only four ever launched. By that year, supervisor John Radcliffe had left.

The final encrypted programmes were shown in December 1994, by then the service had lost £18 million to the BBC. The name BBC Select disappeared in September 1995, being replaced by BBC Focus in its last few weeks on air and the service was closed on 8 October 1995 with the launch of The Learning Zone.

== BBC Selector ==
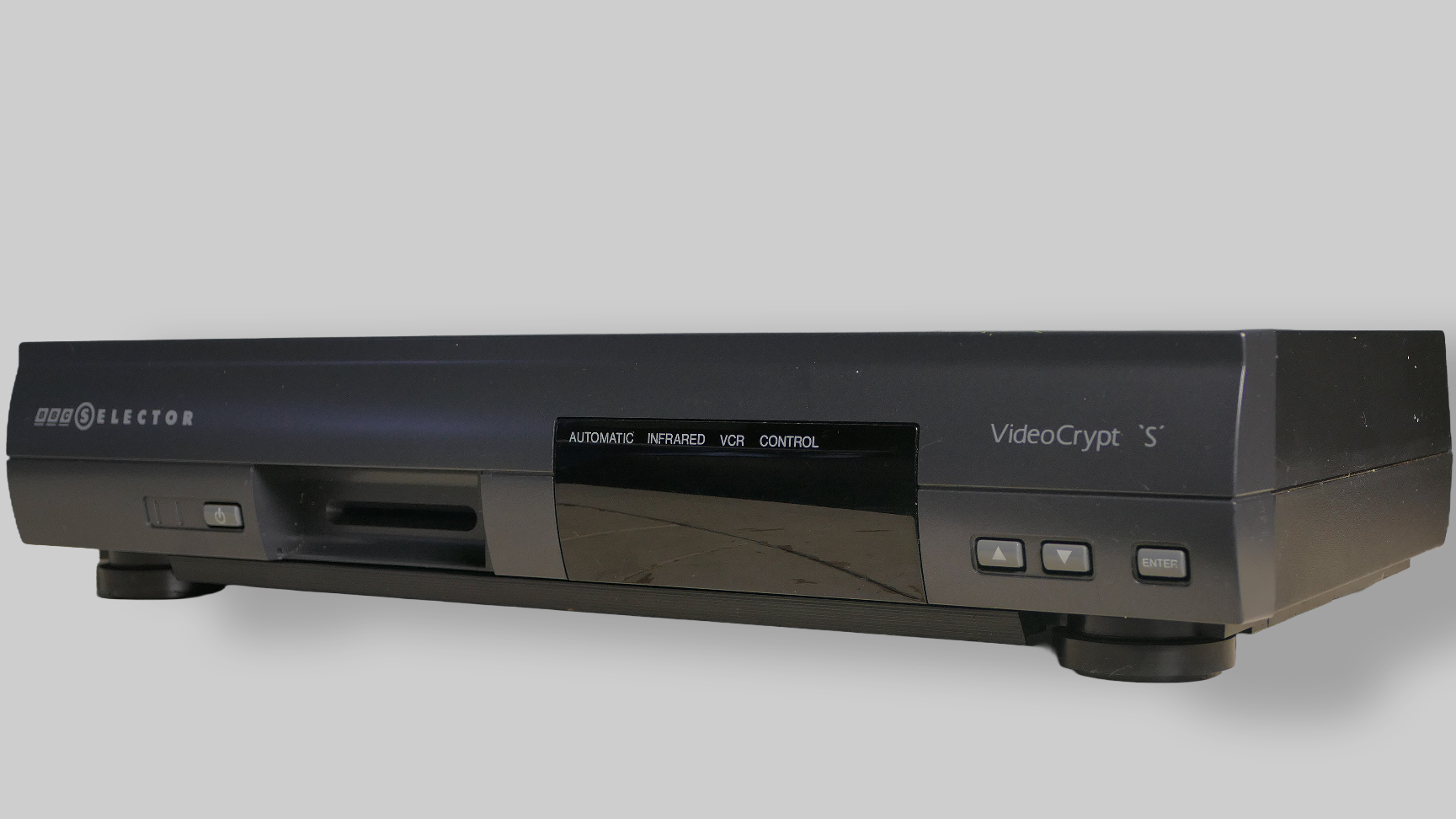
BBC Selector VideoCrypt S receiver-decoder

To watch programming, a set-top box, or BBC Selector and BBC Select viewing card was required which both decoded and unscrambled the programme. The box also received signals, sent out prior to the programme start, that would alert the box to the fact the programme was starting. The box would then trigger VCRs to begin recording by sending out a pulse of Infrared to set off the VCR's recorder, as if the viewer had pressed the record button. The total cost for purchase and installation of a Selector was set at £275. The Selector boxes were not user programmable and required a dealer "installation card" to be inserted in to the conditional access slot to allow adjustments to tuning and to set video recorder IR codes.

The scrambling system used was called VideoCrypt-S. The system was unlike the VideoCrypt system used by British Sky Broadcasting for their analogue satellite transmissions, and used a line shuffling technique to counter many of the issues encountered when using the VideoCrypt type "line cut-and-rotate" system with terrestrial broadcasting.

As the BBC developed compressed digital video circuits it was found experimentally that VideoCrypt-S could not be distributed in these circuits due to the incoherent nature of the scrambled video.

== Presentation ==
The new service had differing presentation to the BBC channels that they broadcast on. The presentation featured a single gold circle in centre screen with the BBC Select caption beneath. The 'S' in Select of the caption has a circle around it. The channel featured no announcements, promotions or captions for upcoming programming, with presentation featuring only the ident, filler and promotions of the service itself.

The ident featured the circle that began rotating, becoming a coin, City of London seal, a rotating machinery part, a retracting telescope, stage light, aeroplane Jet engine and film reel before finally becoming the circle again. The ident could also form out of the background, as the circle drew itself from the top clockwise. This was occasionally used at the startup of the service.

Because the service was designed to be played back on VCR, the breaks between programmes were deliberately long, the average gap was five minutes and gaps could easily reach ten minutes, so that programmes could be set to overrun for 5 minutes so the end would not be missed, but it would avoid disrupting recording of a subsequent programme. In these five-minute breaks, a filler was used that composed the static ring logo against a background that constantly and gradually changes colour, to an extended version of the ident music. This would then usually fade into the ident.

== See also ==
- BBC Learning Zone
