= AlphaStar (satellite broadcasting service) =

Direct-to-home satellite broadcasting service

AlphaStar Digital Television was a direct-to-home satellite broadcasting service for the United States market developed by Canadian firm Tee-Comm Electronics. It was the first direct-to-home satellite broadcasting service in the United States to use the internationally accepted DVB-S broadcasting standard and used 39" satellite dish receivers. Its service launched in July 1996, but was discontinued completely by September 1997 with 40,000 subscribers as the company went through bankruptcy proceedings. The American assets of AlphaStar was used under the auspices of the Champion Telecom Platform which used to own the AlphaStar brand. AlphaStar would also have alleviated a shortage of Canadian satellite capacity by using foreign (US) satellite capacity to fill Canadian needs—indeed this was a requirement for the Canadian company to obtain its license from Canada to commence broadcasting. Tee-Comm, the parent company of AlphaStar had originally co-founded the partnership that created ExpressVu (later Bell Satellite TV) as technology supplier but later divested all interest in ExpressVu.

== History ==
In March 1995, AlphaStar leases 12 transponders on satellite Telstar 402R for a capacity of 110 video and 20 audio channels.

On 1 July 1996, AlphaStar service launches using 12 transponders on satellite Telstar 402R at 89°W in the Ku-band.

In 1996, AlphaStar obtained $102 million in a debt offering, but analysts claim it could have claimed double that sum.

In late 1996, AlphaStar's corporate parent Tee-Comm, owned by Alvin Bahnman, divested itself from the partnership it co-founded that created the Canadian ExpressVu DBS service, known today as Bell Satellite TV. As a result, ExpressVu obtained equipment and technology from EchoStar.

In 1997, AlphaStar was in the process of transitioning to the newly launched Telstar 5 satellite with the capacity for 200 video channels and 40 audio channels.

On 3 March 1997, AlphaStar announced AlphaStar Canada service with 75 channels of service (in reality only 35 were full-time video). The Canadian service never launched as the company went bankrupt and ceased broadcasting operations by September of that same year.

On 27 May 1997, the company initiated bankruptcy proceedings.

In August 1997 the operator of the Telstar 5 satellite, then named Loral Skynet, terminated its contract with AlphaStar after asking to be released from the contract earlier that year.

At 03:00 on 7 August 1997 the company ceased broadcasting operations, stranding 40,000 subscribers. Competitors quickly offered trade-in deals.

In 1998, an Egyptian tycoon named Mahmoud Wahba was reported by the Investor's Business Daily to have bought the assets of the failed AlphaStar for $4.65 million.

Champion Telecom Platform company was launched using the facilities of AlphaStar, providing uplink facilities as well as direct-to-home satellite internet broadband services.

On 19 September 2003, the Telstar 402R satellite used by AlphaStar from 1996-1997, renamed Telstar 4, experienced a circuit failure in its primary power bus and was declared a total loss.

== Technology ==
Originally broadcasting on Telstar 402R in the Ku-band, AlphaStar was in the process of transitioning to the newly launched Telstar 5 satellite and 120 channel service when the company initiated bankruptcy proceedings.

A satellite uplink facility in Oxford, Connecticut was used to uplink the AlphaStar service. The facility was one of the assets of the company now owned by Champion Telecom Platform. The communications teleport was originally built for the United States government for the Strategic Defense Initiative, according to Champion, and can allegedly withstand nuclear attack. Another uplink facility was in Milton, Ontario, Canada.

Dish receiving equipment for AlphaStar were large, 36-39" elliptical reflectors designed to receive medium-powered, linear-polarized Ku-band signals in the Fixed Service Satellite band in the area of 11.7 GHz from Telstar 402 and, eventually Telstar 5 (now named Galaxy 25). By comparison, direct competitors DirecTV and Dish Network offered 18" dishes. The AlphaStar dishes were originally sold by Canadian firm Tee-Comm, an electronics outfit and builder of satellite dishes that was the parent company of AlphaStar.

Set-top boxes for AlphaStar were manufactured by Samsung and Hyundai. The service used DVB-S signalling and MPEG-2 video compression called Compression NetWORKS developed by a firm named TV/COM International. It was the first United States direct-to-home broadcaster to use what became known as DVB-S. While pricey and inconvenient to use these receivers can be used to receive unencrypted satellite transmissions known as FTA.

As AlphaStar liquidated its inventory the expensive AlphaStar dishes were resold to customers who wished to receive ethnic programming. An Egyptian broadcasting service which formerly broadcast several channels on AlphaStar offered assistance in refitting AlphaStar systems to receive their channels from another satellite, Intelsat Americas 5, which, ironically, was the new name of the very same Telstar 5 satellite that AlphaStar was in the process of migrating to. Though exceedingly rare, refitted AlphaStar dishes can still be found on rooftops in larger urban ethnic communities and their large size offers great signal quality.

== See also ==
- Bell Satellite TV is a Canadian satellite broadcaster that was co-founded by Tee-Comm as ExpressVu.
- Galaxy 25, a satellite formerly known as Telstar 5 and Intelsat Americas 5, broadcasts some remnants of AlphaStar's ethnic channel offerings.
- Loral Skynet operated the Telstar 402R satellite and the then-named Telstar 5 satellite services.
