= Television encryption =

Method to control access to pay television services

Television encryption, often referred to as scrambling, is encryption used to control access to pay television services, usually cable, satellite, or Internet Protocol television (IPTV) services.

== History ==
Pay television exists to make revenue from subscribers, and sometimes those subscribers do not pay. The prevention of piracy on cable and satellite networks has been one of the main factors in the development of Pay TV encryption systems.

The early cable-based Pay TV networks used no security. This led to problems with people connecting to the network without paying. Consequently, some methods were developed to frustrate these self-connectors. The early Pay TV systems for cable television were based on a number of simple measures. The most common of these was a channel-based filter that would effectively stop the channel being received by those who had not subscribed. These filters would be added or removed according to the subscription. As the number of television channels on these cable networks grew, the filter-based approach became increasingly impractical.

Other techniques, such as adding an interfering signal to the video or audio, began to be used as the simple filter solutions were easily bypassed. As the technology evolved, addressable set-top boxes became common, and more complex scrambling techniques such as digital encryption of the audio or video cut and rotate (where a line of video is cut at a particular point and the two parts are then reordered around this point) were applied to signals.

Encryption was used to protect satellite-distributed feeds for cable television networks. Some of the systems used for cable feed distribution were expensive. As the DTH market grew, less secure systems began to be used. Many of these systems (such as Oak Orion) were variants of cable television scrambling systems that affected the synchronisation part of the video, inverted the video signal, or added an interfering frequency to the video. All of these analogue scrambling techniques were easily defeated.

In France, Canal+ launched a scrambled service in 1984. It was also claimed that it was an unbreakable system. Unfortunately for that company, an electronics magazine, "Radio Plans", published a design for a pirate decoder within a month of the channel launching.

In the US, HBO was one of the first services to encrypt its signal using the VideoCipher II system. In Europe, FilmNet scrambled its satellite service in September 1986, thus creating one of the biggest markets for pirate satellite TV decoders in the world, because the system that FilmNet used was easily hacked. One of FilmNet's main attractions was that it would screen hard-core porn films on various nights of the week. The VideoCipher II system proved somewhat more difficult to hack, but it eventually fell prey to the pirates.

== Conditional access ==
=== Cable and early satellite television encryption ===
A scrambled channel featuring a Paramount Pictures film (Possibly VideoCipher II or Oak ORION. Horizontal and vertical synch signal have been replaced by digital data with the effect that the picture is not properly displayed on the TV screen. ) as viewed without a decoder.

Analog and digital pay television have several conditional access systems that are used for pay-per-view (PPV) and other subscriber related services. Originally, analog-only cable television systems relied on set-top boxes to control access to programming, as television sets originally were not "cable-ready". Analog encryption was typically limited to premium channels such as HBO or channels with adult-oriented content. In those cases, various proprietary video synchronization suppression methods were used to control access to programming. In some of these systems, the necessary sync signal was on a separate subcarrier though sometimes the sync polarity is simply inverted, in which case, if used in conjunction with PAL, a SECAM L TV with a cable tuner can be used to partially descramble the signal though only in black and white and with inverted luminance and thus a multi standard TV which supports PAL L is preferred to decode the color as well. This, however will lead to a part of the video signal being received as audio as well and thus another TV with preferably no auto mute should be used for audio decoding. Analog set-top boxes have largely been replaced by digital set-top boxes that can directly control access to programming as well as digitally decrypt signals.

Although several analog encryption types were tested in the early 1980s, VideoCipher II became the de facto analog encryption standard that C-Band satellite pay TV channels used. Early adopters of VCII were HBO and Cinemax, encrypting full time beginning in January 1986; Showtime and The Movie Channel beginning in May 1986; and CNN and Headline news, in July of that year. VideoCipher II was replaced as a standard by VCII+ in the early 1990s, and it in turn was replaced by VCII+ RS. A VCII-capable satellite receiver is required to decode VCII channels. VCII has largely been replaced by DigiCipher 2 in North America. Originally, VCII-based receivers had a separate modem technology for pay-per-view access known as Videopal. This technology became fully integrated in later-generation analog satellite television receivers.

- VideoCipher I (deprecated)
- VideoCipher II (deprecated)
- VideoCipher II+
- VideoCipher II RS (Renewable Security)

=== Digital cable and satellite television encryption ===
DigiCipher 2 is General Instrument's proprietary video distribution system. DigiCipher 2 is based upon MPEG-2. A 4DTV satellite receiver is required to decode DigiCipher 2 channels. In North America, most digital cable programming is accessed with DigiCipher 2-based set-top boxes. DigiCipher 2 may also be referred to as DCII.

PowerVu is another popular digital encryption technology used for non-residential usage. PowerVu was developed by Scientific Atlanta. Other commercial digital encryption systems are, Nagravision (by Kudelski), Viaccess (by France Telecom), and Wegener.

In the US, both DirecTV and Dish Network direct-broadcast satellite systems use digital encryption standards for controlling access to programming. DirecTV uses VideoGuard, a system designed by NDS. DirecTV has been cracked in the past, which led to an abundance of cracked smartcards being available on the black market. However, a switch to a stronger form of smart card (the P4 card) wiped out DirectTV piracy soon after it was introduced. Since then, no public cracks have become available. Dish Network uses Nagravision (2 and 3) encryption. The now-defunct VOOM and PrimeStar services both used General Instruments/Motorola equipment, and thus used a DigiCipher 2-based system very similar to that of earlier 4DTV large dish satellite systems.

In Canada, both Bell Satellite TV and Shaw Direct DBS systems use digital encryption standards. Bell TV, like Dish Network, uses Nagravision for encryption. Shaw Direct, meanwhile, uses a DigiCipher 2-based system, due to their equipment also being sourced from General Instruments/Motorola.

== Older television encryption systems ==
=== Zenith Phonevision ===
Zenith Electronics developed an encryption scheme for their Phonevision system of the 1950s and 1960s.

=== Oak ORION ===
Oak Orion was originally used for analog satellite television pay channel access in Canada. It was innovative for its time as it used digital audio. It has been completely replaced by digital encryption technologies. Oak Orion was used by Sky Channel in Europe between the years 1982 and 1987, and M-Net in South Africa from 1986 to 2018. Oak developed related encryption systems for cable TV and broadcast pay TV services such as ONTV.

=== Leitch Technology ===
Leitch Viewguard is an analog encryption standard used primarily by broadcast TV networks in North America. Its method of scrambling is by re-ordering the lines of video (Line Shuffle), but leaves the audio intact. Terrestrial broadcast CATV systems in Northern Canada used this conditional access system for many years. It is only occasionally used today on some satellite circuits because of its similarity to D2-MAC and B-MAC.

There was also a version that encrypted the audio using a digital audio stream in the horizontal blanking interval like the VCII system. One US network used that for its affiliate feeds and would turn off the analog sub carriers on the satellite feed.

=== B-MAC ===
B-MAC has not been used for DTH applications since PrimeStar switched to an all-digital delivery system in the mid-1990s.

=== VideoCrypt ===
VideoCrypt was an analogue cut and rotate scrambling system with a smartcard based conditional access system. It was used in the 1990s by several European satellite broadcasters, mainly British Sky Broadcasting. It was also used by Sky New Zealand (Sky-NZ). One version of Videocrypt (VideoCrypt-S) had the capability of scrambling sound. A soft encryption option was also available where the encrypted video could be transmitted with a fixed key and any VideoCrypt decoder could decode it.

=== RITC Discret 11 ===
RITC Discret 11 is a system based on horizontal video line delay and audio scrambling. The start point of each line of video was pseudorandomly delayed by either 0 ns, 902 ns, or 1804 ns. First used in 1984 by French channel Canal Plus, it was widely compromised after the December 1984 issue of "Radio Plans" magazine printed decoder plans. The BBC also used a later revision of the encryption system intended for use outside of France, Discret 12, in the late 1980s, as part of testing the use of off-air hours for encrypted specialist programming, with BMTV (British Medical Television) being broadcast on BBC Two. This would ultimately lead to the launch of the scrambled BBC Select service in the early 1990s.

=== SATPAC ===
Used by European channel FilmNet, the SATPAC interfered with the horizontal and vertical synchronisation signals and transmitted a signal containing synchronisation and authorisation data on a separate subcarrier. The system was first used in September 1986 and saw many upgrades as it was easily compromised by pirates. By September 1992, FilmNet changed to D2-MAC EuroCrypt.

=== Telease MAAST / Sat-Tel SAVE ===
Added an interfering sine wave of a frequency circa 93.750 kHz to the video signal. This interfering signal was approximately six times the frequency of the horizontal refresh. It had an optional sound scrambling using Spectrum Inversion. Used in the UK by BBC for its world service broadcasts and by the now defunct UK movie channel "Premiere".

=== Payview III ===
Used by German/Swiss channel Teleclub in the early 1990s, this system employed various methods such as video inversion, modification of synchronisation signals, and a pseudo line delay effect.

=== D2-MAC EuroCrypt ===
Conditional Access system using the D2-MAC standard. Developed mainly by France Telecom, the system was smartcard based. The encryption algorithm in the smartcard was based on DES. It was one of the first smart card based systems to be compromised.

=== Nagravision analogue system ===
An older Nagravision system for scrambling analogue satellite and terrestrial television programs was used in the 1990s, for example by the German pay-TV broadcaster Premiere. In this line-shuffling system, 32 lines of the PAL TV signal are temporarily stored in both the encoder and decoder and read out in permuted order under the control of a pseudorandom number generator. A smartcard security microcontroller (in a key-shaped package) decrypts data that is transmitted during the blanking intervals of the TV signal and extracts the random seed value needed for controlling the random number generation. The system also permitted the audio signal to be scrambled by inverting its spectrum at 12.8 kHz using a frequency mixer.

== See also ==
- Broadcast encryption
- Conditional access
- Pirate decryption
