= Viaccess =

Conditional access system

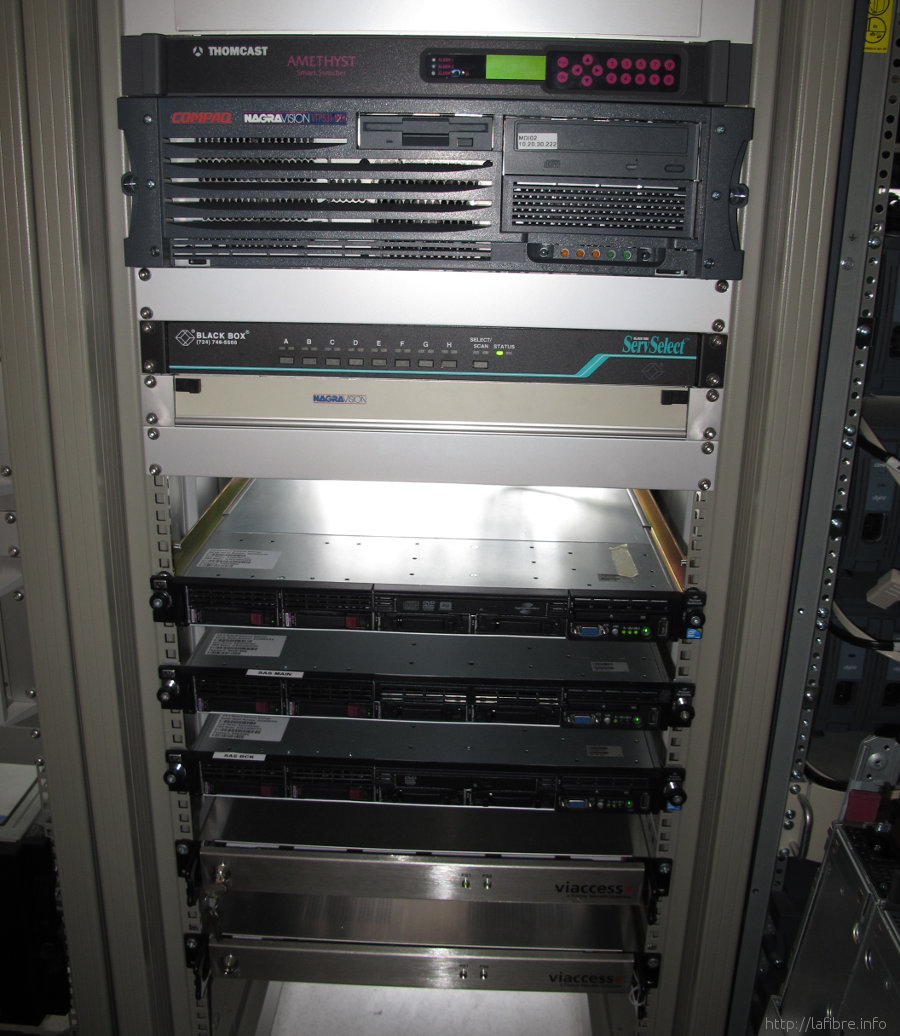
Viaccess encryption servers and card readers in the bottom half of the image

Viaccess is a conditional access system developed by France Télécom, now Orange. There are six versions in use today, Viaccess PC2.3, Viaccess PC2.4, Viaccess PC2.5, Viaccess PC2.6, Viaccess ACS3.x/Prime Sentinel, Viaccess ACS4.1, Viaccess ACS5.0, and Viaccess ACS6.x/Adaptive Sentinel.

Viaccess was developed as the digital version of the EuroCrypt system used with the hybrid MAC system,

The first version is sometimes referred to as Viaccess 1, and the latter three, although different, as Viaccess 2. PC2.3 and PC2.4 are known to be ineffective, and many set-top boxes can be 'patched' to decrypt Viaccess signals without payment, however PC2.5 and PC2.6 are secure, with PC2.5 remaining secure two years after its first commercial deployment. PC2.6 was introduced at the end of 2005. PC3.0 was introduced during mid-2007.

There are two modifications of Viaccess PC2.3 in use. The first, known as TPS Crypt, is used by TPS. Despite being compromised also, the TPS Crypt system has been further modified to use Advanced Encryption System (AES) keys. These AES keys were originally updated once weekly, however after this inconvenienced unauthorised viewers little, a second TPS crypt system was introduced, by which keys are changed every 12 minutes, with keys being sent over TPS's internal Open TV system. This therefore meant that only TPS receivers could receive the new AES key, and not the insecure TPS subscription cards. Monitoring and analysing of the keys by hacking groups, however, has brought about key lists, where the AES keys have been successfully predicted. Implementation of this procedure of automatically updating keys has proved difficult, if not impossible, to implement on many satellite receivers, rendering the TPS Crypt AES system a general success.

In 2008, Viaccess acquired Orca interactive and in 2012 they merge under the name Viaccess-Orca, which specializes in video content security and anti-piracy, OTT & IPTV platforms and targeted TV advertising.

The second Viaccess modification, called ThalesCrypt, is used by Canal Satellite France to protect its contents on the transport network to the head-ends of the cable networks; it is an over-encryption mechanism of the original protocol encryption keys.

Viaccess is currently used by a large number of providers. These include:

- Team:Media Bosnia Some programs
- ART
- NTV Plus
- Televisa Networks
- Canal Satellite France
- FRANSAT
- AB Sat
- ETTV
- TBLTV
- Home2US
- Orange TV Romania
- Orange Polska
- YouSee
- Croatian Radiotelevision
- RTV Slovenija
- Skylink Czechia/Slovakia
- SRG SSR idée suisse
- Cyfrowy Polsat
- Platforma Canal+

Viaccess is the 3rd largest conditional access system provider in the world (in 2004).

Viaccess is also a subsidiary of Orange S.A. which offers pay TV and digital rights management enabled software.

Orca Interactive is a subsidiary of Viaccess which offers IPTV Middleware since 2008.
