= Conax =

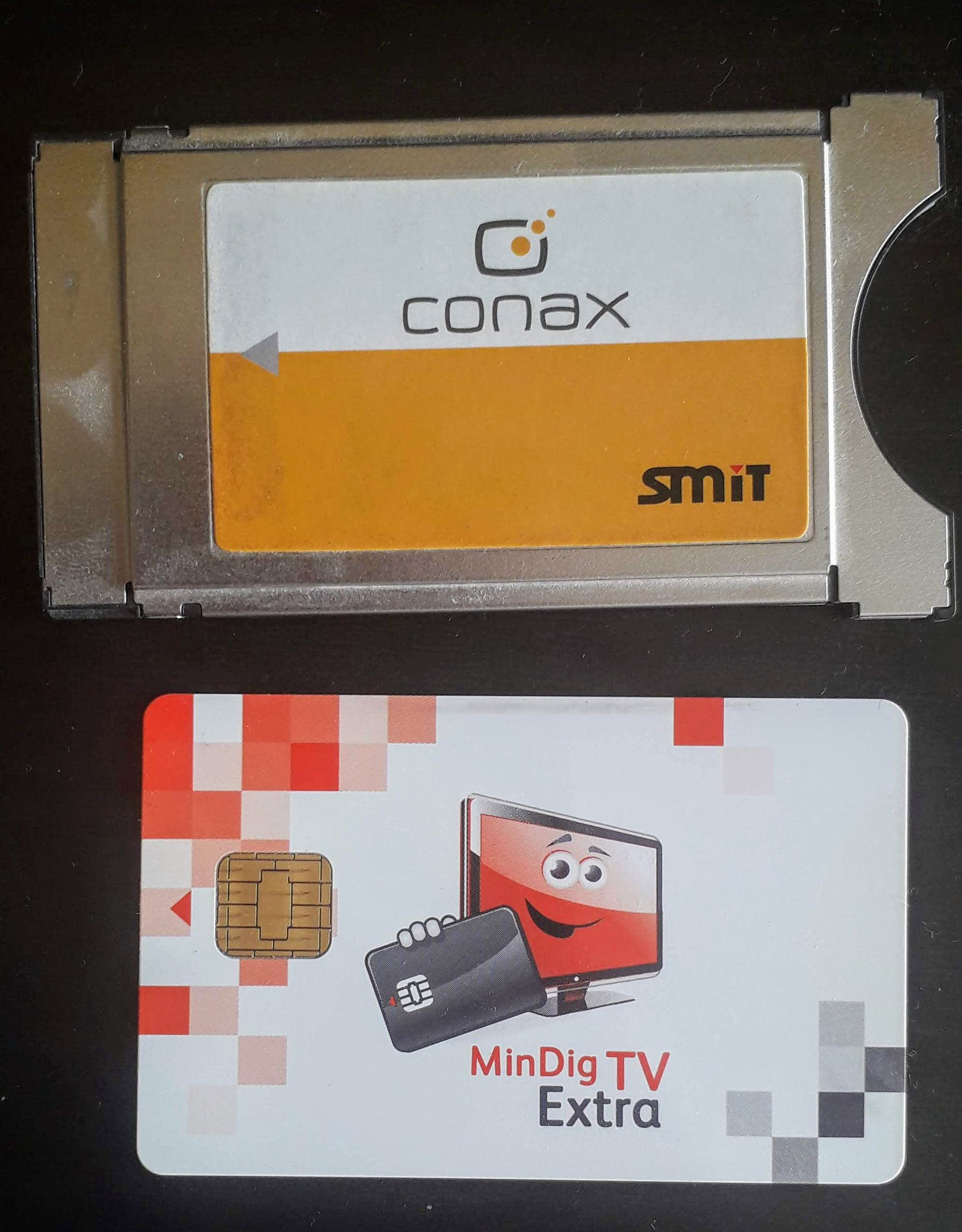
A Conax CAM module manufactured by SMiT

Conax develops television encryption, conditional access and content security for digital television. Conax provide CAS technology to pay TV operators in 85 countries. The company has offices in Norway (headquarters), Russia, Germany, Brazil, the United States, Canada, Mexico, Indonesia, Philippines, Thailand, China, Singapore, and India, with a 24/7 Global Support Center in India.

Conax stems from Telenor Research Labs in the 1980s. It was incorporated as a separate company Conax AS in 1994.

In March 2014, the company was sold by Telenor Group to Swiss-based Kudelski Group for NOK 1.5 billion.

Conax CAS employs several versions, namely Conax CAS 3, Conax CAS 5, Conax CAS 7, Conax CAS 7.5 and Conax Contego. Those versions are shared amongst two types of CAM: Chipset Pairing and Generic/Non-Chipset Pairing in which compatible TV Smart Cards may not support one or the other. The company also provide DRM-solution for streaming services based on Microsoft PlayReady and Google Widevine.

A few pay TV operators using Conax conditional access are (alphabetical order) :

- 4TV Myanmar
- AKTA Telecom Romania
- Allente (Norway) (previously Viasat/Canal Digital Satellite)
- Antik SAT (Slovakia)
- Cignal (Philippines)
- Polsat Box, Platforma Canal+ and Orange Polska (Poland)
- DigitAlb (Albania)
- Digicable India
- Dish TV (India)
- DMAX HD - Germany
- Focus Sat (operated by UPC Romania, later M7 Group)
- HOMESAT (Lebanon)
- Joyne Netherlands
- JSTV (Europe)
- K-Vision (Indonesia)
- Malivision (Mali)
- Mindig TV Hungary
- RiksTV (Norway)
- SBB (Serbia)
- SitiCable India
- StarTimes Media (SSA)
- Telenor (Norway and Sweden)
- TeleRed (Argentina)
- Tring (Albania)
- TVR Romania
- Turksat KabloTV

Conax is also used by MNC Media's free to air channels (RCTI, MNCTV and GTV along with iNews during sport programmes) and K-Vision to prevent any piracy or unauthorized retransmission by a third-parties since 2019.
