= Mediaguard =

Conditional access system

MediaGuard is a conditional access system for digital television developed by SECA (Société Européenne de Contrôle d'Accès; renamed to Canal+ Technologies SA) (CEO François Carayol), a subsidiary of Canal+ Group, sold to Thomson (CEO Thierry Breton). Then Canal+ Technologies SA was broken in two pieces by Thomson in 2003, the MediaGuard sold to Nagra France and the MediaHighway to NDS France.

MediaGuard has been on the European market since 1996. It is also used in Middle-East and Asia. MediaGuard is notably used by Canal+.

Manufacturers which incorporate MediaGuard into their equipment are notably Hitachi, Ltd., Humax, JVC, Kenwood Electronics, Nokia, Pace Micro Technology, Philips, Pioneer Corporation, Sagem, Samsung Electronics, Sony Corporation, Strong, Thomson, and Toshiba.

The original MediaGuard system has been broken by the end of the 1990s, allegedly by rival NDS Group, which resulted in new cards being distributed to customers in 2002.

This original version of MediaGuard in the set-top-box is composed of two elements:

- The software running in the box from the technology developed by the company HyperPanel Lab and licensed by Canal+. This technology, called the HyperPanel run has been split into two subsets: MediaHighway and MediaGuard;
- A smart card whose technology was developed by SECA
