= Nagravision =

Swiss conditional access system brand

Nagra Kudelski Group logo

Nagravision (or Nagra Kudelski or simply Nagra) is a company of the Kudelski Group that develops conditional access systems for digital cable and satellite television. The name is also used for their main products, the Nagravision encryption systems.

== Analog system ==
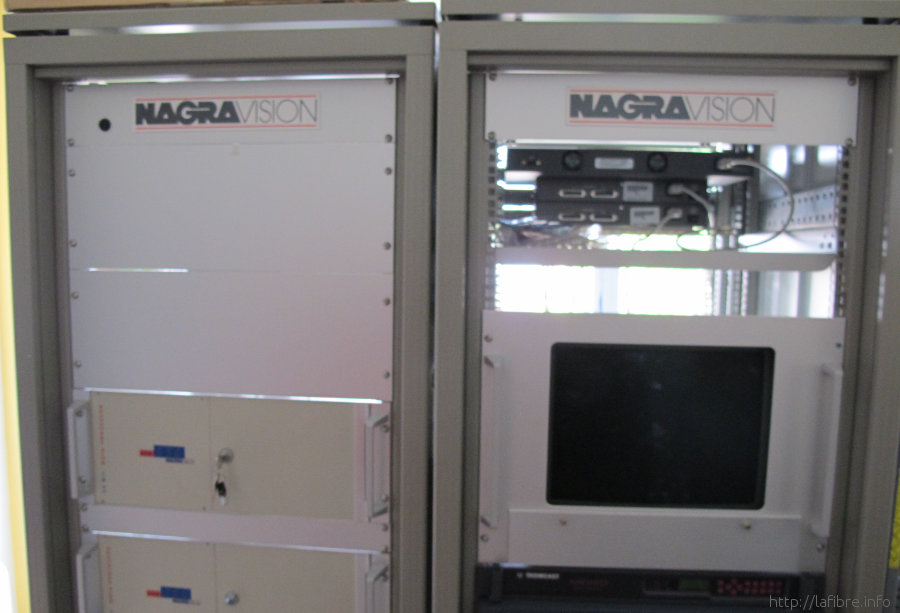
Analog NagraVision

An analog Nagravision system (Syster) for scrambling analog satellite television programs was used in the 1990s. In this line-shuffling system, bottom 32 lines of the PAL TV signal are shifted in time by one video field, and read out in permuted order under the control of a pseudorandom number generator. A smartcard security microcontroller (in a key-shaped package) decrypts data that is transmitted during the blanking intervals of the TV signal mixed with teletext and extracts the random seed value which contains present line combination needed for reverting the picture back. The system also permitted the audio signal to be modulated at 12.8 kHz using a frequency mixer.

== Digital systems ==
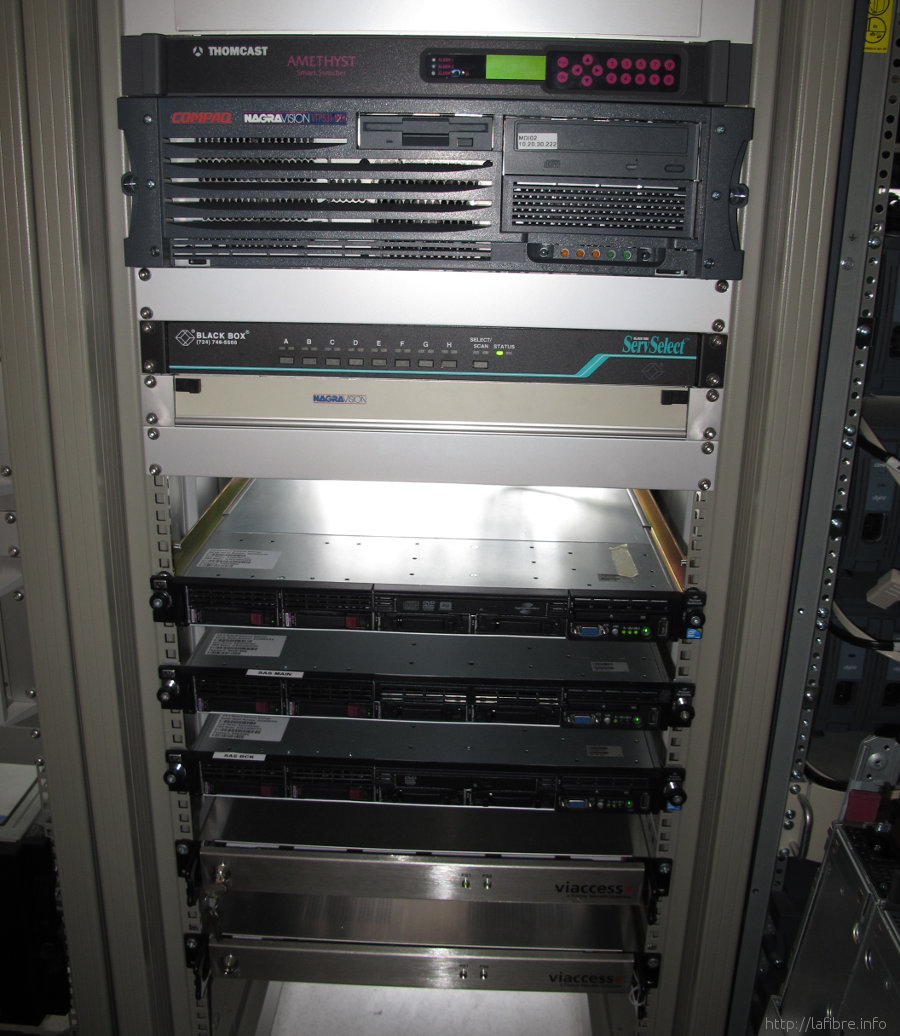
In the upper half of the image there are 2 digital Nagravision systems. On the bottom half there are three encryption servers and two card readers for viaccess. These can be connected to a system using DVB simulcrypt

4 currently used versions of Nagravision are in common use for digital satellite television, known as Nagravision, Nagravision Cardmagedon, Nagravision Aladin and Nagravision Merlin. Nagravision Cardmagedon and Aladin are often confused with each other and used under the term "Nagravision 2" which technically does not exist. Nagravision Cardmagedon is, however, a complicated combination of Nagravision Aladin and Mediaguard SECA 2 encryption. Nagravision Merlin is also known as Nagravision 3.

The decryption unit is either integrated into a receiver, available as a conditional-access module (CAM), or as one of many encryption schemes supported on a CAM emulator.

Nagravision has been adopted all over the world as a conditional access system, with providers:

- Bell Satellite TV (Canada) (Nagravision 3)
- BIG TV (India)
- Cabovisão (Portugal) (Being adopted gradually across the network - Nagravision 3 and SECA Mediaguard)
- Canal+ and CanalSat (France) (Nagravision Media Access *NEW TYPE* [Basically Updated Nagra 3 "Merlin"])
- Claro TV (Central America, Dominican Republic) (Nagravision 1 (outdated) with MPEG-4 encoding support custom added)
- Claro TV+ DTH (Brazil) (Nagravision 3)
- Cyfrowy Polsat (Poland) (Nagravision 3)
- Digi TV (RCS & RDS) (Romania, Hungary, Czech Republic, Slovakia) (Nagravision 3)
- MEO (Portugal, Nagravision 3 "Merlin")
- Movistar+ (Previously Digital+) (Spain, Nagravision 3)
- Dish Network (USA) (Transition to Nagravision 3 was completed on 6/18/09)
- Dream Satellite TV (Philippines) (Nagravision 3)
- First Media (Indonesia) (Nagravision 3)
- HD+ (Germany) (Nagravision 3)
- Look Communications (Canada)
- M7 Group S.A. (Several European countries)
- Movistar (Before Telefonica) (Chile, Colombia, Perú, Bolivia) (Nagravision 3)
- Vivo TV DTH (Before Telefonica) (Brazil, Nagravision 3)
- Numericable (Belgium, France, Luxembourg) (Nagravision 3 "Merlin")
- Sky Deutschland (Germany) (Nagravision 3) (pre-2014)
- StarHub TV (Singapore) (Nagravision 3)
- Star Digital (Turkey) (Nagravision 3)
- Telenet (Belgium) (Belgium) (Nagravision 2)
- Tivù Sat, Mediaset Premium (Italy) (Nagravision 3 "Tiger" and "Merlin" (4K))
- SAT HD Regional, used exclusively by regional owned-and-operated (O&O) stations and affiliates of TV Globo, Band, SBT, Record and Amazon Sat, alongside national stations Futura and TV Diário; available via TVRO on Star One D2 (70°W) (Brazil, Nagravision 3 'Merlin').
- Nova Parabólica on Sky Brazil B1 (43°W) (Brazil, Nagravision 3 'Merlin').
- NOS Comunicacoes (Portugal) (Nagravision 3)
- UPC, now Vodafone (on satellite) (Nagravision 3)
- Virgin Media (United Kingdom) (Nagravision 3 "Merlin", swapped from Nagravision 1 during 2009/10)
- Top Up TV (United Kingdom) (Nagravision 3 "Merlin" swapped from SECA2 in 2008)

Analog encoded frame in Nagravision Syster with Canal+ logo.The frame is decode-able.

== See also ==
- Kudelski Group
