= List of movie television channels =

Movie channels are television specialty channels that present film content.

Popular movie channels:

- 3+ Movies (Switzerland)
- 7flix (Australia)
- ABS-CBN Corporation
  - Cine Mo! (Philippines)
  - Cinema One (Philippines)
  - Movie Central (Philippines)
- Abzy Movies (India)
- AMC Networks
  - AMC (United States)
  - AMC (Latin America)
  - AMC (Portugal and Spain)
  - AMC (Europe)
  - Canal Hollywood (Portugal & Spain)
  - Europa Europa (Latin America)
  - Film & Arts (Latin America)
  - Film+ (Czechia & Slovakia)
  - Film Cafe (Hungary, Romania and Poland)
  - Film Mania (Hungary & Romania)
  - IFC (United States & Canada)
  - Legend (United Kingdom) part of the CBS-AMC Networks UK Channels Partnership
  - Somos (Spain)
  - Sundance Channel (Canada)
  - SundanceTV (United States)
  - ShortsTV (United States)
- Aruj TV (Pakistan)
- Al Nahar Movies
- Amazon/MGM
  - MGM HD (United States)
  - MGM+ (United States)
  - This TV (United States)
- ART Movie World
- ArtKino (Kosovo)
- Asian Television Network
  - ATN Movies (Canada)
  - ATN B4U Movies (Canada)
  - Filmy (Canada)
  - UTV Movies (Canada)
- Astro Malaysia Holdings
  - Astro Boo (Malaysia & Brunei)
  - Astro Citra (Malaysia & Brunei)
  - Astro FAM Time (Malaysia & Brunei)
  - Astro Showcase (Malaysia & Brunei)
  - Astro Showtime (Malaysia & Brunei)
  - Astro Thangathirai (Malaysia & Brunei)
  - Astro Vellithirai (Malaysia & Brunei)
- B4U
  - B4U Movies (India)
  - B4U Kadak (India)
  - B4U Plus
  - B4U Aflam
  - B4U Bhojpuri (India)
- Be Ciné (Belgium)
- Bell Media
  - Cinépop (Canada)
  - Crave (Canada)
  - HBO (Canada)
  - Super Écran (Canada)
  - Vu! (Canada)
- beIN Media Group
  - beIN MOVIES Premium HD (MENA)
  - beIN MOVIES Action HD (MENA)
  - beIN MOVIES Drama HD (MENA)
  - beIN MOVIES Family HD (MENA)
  - beIN MOVIES Platinum HD (Turkey)
  - beIN MOVIES Stars HD (Turkey)
  - beIN MOVIES Türk HD (Turkey)
  - beIN Box Office 1 (MENA)
  - beIN Box Office 2 (MENA)
- Bioskop Indonesia (Indonesia)
- BS10 Premium (Japan)
- Canal+ S.A./StudioCanal
  - Ale Kino+ (Poland)
  - Canal+ Action (Austria, Czechia, Netherlands, Slovakia & Hungary)
  - Canal+ Action Ouest (Africa)
  - Canal+ Action Centre (Africa)
  - Canal+ Box Office (France)
  - Canal+ Cinéma(s) (France, Caledonia, Caribbean & Rèunion)
  - Canal+ Cinéma Ouest (Africa)
  - Canal+ Cinéma Centre (Africa)
  - Canal+ Family Ouest (Africa)
  - Canal+ Family Centre (Africa)
  - Canal+ Film (Poland)
  - Canal+ Grand Écran (France)
  - Canal+ Zat Lenn (Myanmar)
  - Ciné+ OCS (France, Africa, Calédonie, Caraïbes & Rèunion)
    - Ciné+ Classic
    - Ciné+ Frisson
    - Ciné+ Émotion
    - Ciné+ Family
    - Ciné+ Festival
  - DStv/MultiChoice
  - M-Net Movies (Africa, South Africa)
    - M-Net Movies+
    - M-Net Movies Stars
    - M-Net Movies Legends
  - Film1 (Netherlands)
    - Film1 Action
    - Film1 Drama
    - Film1 Family
    - Film1 Premiere
  - SPI International/FlimBox+ Stream
    - FlimBox+ One (Africa)
    - FlimBox+ One (European & United States)
    - FlimBox+ One (MENA)
    - FlimBox+ One (Netherlands)
    - FlimBox+ One (Poland)
    - FlimBox+ One (Russia)
    - FilmBox+ Love & Crime (various countries)
    - FilmBox+ Hits (various countries)
    - FilmBox+ Emotion (various countries)
    - FilmBox+ Comedy (various countries)
    - FilmBox+ Festival (various countries)
    - FilmBox+ Action (various countries)
- CCTV-6 (China)
- Celestial Tiger Entertainment
  - Celestial Movies (Hong Kong)
  - Celestial Classic Movies (Hong Kong)
  - Celestial Movies Pinoy (Hong Kong & Philippines)
  - CM+ (Hong Kong & Singapore)
  - PopC (Hong Kong)
  - Thrill (Hong Kong)
- CJ E&M
  - OCN (South Korea)
  - OCN Movies (South Korea)
  - OCN Movies 2 (South Korea)
  - TvN Movies (Singapore & Indonesian)
    - tvN Movies - tvN Movies Pinoy (Philippines only)
- CME
  - bTV Cinema (Bulgaria)
  - Kino (Slovenia)
  - Nova Cinema (Czechia)
  - Pro Cinema (Romania)
- Ciné 12 (Mauritius)
- CINE.AR (Argentina)
- Cine Mexicano (Mexico)
- Cinelatino (United States & Mexico)
- Cinema (Mexico)
- Cinema1 (Pakistan)
- CinemaWorld (Singapore, Taiwan, Malaysia, Indonesia, Philippines, Vietnam, China & Sri Lanka)
- Citra Bioskop (Indonesia)
- Clever Group
  - Cinemaraton (Romania)
  - Cinemaraton Moldova (Moldova)
- Corus Entertainment
  - IFC (Canada)
  - MovieTime (Canada)
  - Showcase (Canada)
- Comcast/Sky
  - Sky Cinema (Germany)
    - Sky Cinema Premiere
    - Sky Cinema Blockbuster
    - Sky Cinema Action
    - Sky Cinema Feelgood
    - Sky Cinema Classics
  - Sky Cinema (Italy)
    - Sky Cinema Uno
    - Sky Cinema Stories
    - Sky Cinema Collection
    - Sky Cinema Family
    - Sky Cinema Action
    - Sky Cinema Suspense
    - Sky Cinema Romance
    - Sky Cinema Drama
    - Sky Cinema Comedy
    - Sky Cinema Uno +24
  - Sky Cinema (United Kingdom)
    - Sky Cinema Premiere
    - Sky Cinema Select
    - Sky Cinema Hits
    - Sky Cinema Greats
    - Sky Cinema Animation
    - Sky Cinema Family
    - Sky Cinema Action
    - Sky Cinema Comedy
    - Sky Cinema Thriller
    - Sky Cinema Drama
    - Sky Cinema Sci-Fi Horror
- Cyta
  - Cablenet Cinema (Cyprus)
- DM Dhoom (Pakistan)
- Demirören Group/D-Smart
  - Moviesmart Classic HD (Turkey)
  - Moviesmart Turk HD (Turkey)
- Diema (Bulgaria)
- Dubai One (MENA)
- Dunia Sinema (Malaysia)
- Disney/FX Networks
  - FXM (United States)
  - LMN (United States)
  - FXX (Canada)
  - Disney+ Cinema (United Kingdom)
  - Star Action (MENA)
  - Star Films (MENA)
  - Asianet Movies (India)
  - Star Gold (India)
  - Star Gold 2 (India)
  - Star Gold Romance (India)
  - Star Gold Select (India)
  - Star Gold Thrills (India)
  - Star Maa Gold (India)
  - Star Maa Movies (India)
  - Star Movies (Portugal)
  - Star Movies (Balkans)
  - Star Movies (Asia)
  - Star Movies (India)
  - Star Movies Select (India)
  - Star Pravah Pictures (India)
  - Star Jalsha Movies (India)
  - Star Suvarna Plus (India)
  - Star Utsav Movies (India)
  - Star Vijay Super (India)
- Dreamia
  - Canal Blast (Angola, Mozambique & Portugal)
- Duo Media Networks
  - Filmzone (Estonia and Latvia)
  - Filmzone Plus (Estonia, Latvia, Lithuania)
- EBS Cinema (Ethiopia)
- Emax (Pakistan)
- e.tv (e media investments)
  - eMovies (South Africa)
  - eMovies Extra (South Africa)
- ETV Cinema (South India)
- E. W. Scripps Company
  - Escape (United States)
  - Grit (United States)
- Falak TV (Pakistan)
- Film4 (Hungary)
- Film4
  - Film4 (United Kingdom)
  - Film4 (Ireland)
- Film Now (Romania)
- Filmazia (Pakistan)
- Film World (Pakistan)
- FLiK (Indonesian)
- For you (Italy)
- Fox Corporation
  - Movies! (United States)
- Foxtel
  - Foxtel Movies Action (Australia)
  - Foxtel Movies Comedy (Australia)
  - Foxtel Movies Drama (Australia)
  - Foxtel Movies Family (Australia)
  - Foxtel Movies Greats (Australia)
  - Foxtel Movies Hits (Australia)
  - Foxtel Movies Romance (Australia)
  - Foxtel Movies Premiere (Australia)
  - Foxtel Movies Ultra HD (Australia)
  - British Cinema (Australia)
  - Aussie Classics (Australia)
- Globo
  - Megapix (Brazil)
  - Telecine
    - Telecine Premium (Brazil)
    - Telecine Action (Brazil)
    - Telecine Touch (Brazil)
    - Telecine Pipoca (Brazil)
    - Telecine Cult (Brazil)
    - Telecine Fun (Brazil)
- Go3 Films (Baltics)
- Greek Cinema (Greece)
- Groupe TVA
  - ADDIK (Canada)
  - Canal Indigo (Canada)
  - Prise 2 (Canada)
- Grupa Polsat Plus
  - Polsat Film (Poland)
  - Polsat Film 2 (Poland)
- Hallmark Movies & Mysteries (United States)
- HDNet Movies (United States)
- Hits Movies (Singapore)
- Hollywood Suite (Canada)
- Channel F (China)
- I Heart Movies (Philippines)
- IFilm (Iran)
- IRIB Namayesh (Iran)
- J&T Enterprise
  - CS Film (Czechia & Slovakia)
  - CS Horor (Czechia & Slovakia)
  - JOJ Cinema (Czechia & Slovakia)
- KabloTV/Sinema TV
  - Sinema TV (Turkey)
  - Sinema TV 2 (Turkey)
  - Sinema Aksiyon HD (Turkey)
  - Sinema Aksiyon 2 HD (Turkey)
  - Sinema Komedi HD (Turkey)
  - Sinema Komedi 2 HD (Turkey)
  - Sinema Yerli HD (Turkey)
  - Sinema Yerli 2 HD (Turkey)
  - Sinema 1001 HD (Turkey)
  - Sinema 1002 HD (Turkey)
  - Sinema Aile HD (Turkey)
  - Sinema Aile 2 HD (Turkey)
- Kino Barrandov (Czechia)
- Kino Nova (Bulgaria)
- Kinowelt TV (Germany)
- La7 Cinema (Italy)
- Lionsgate
  - MoviePlex (United States)
  - Starz (United States)
  - Starz (Canada)
  - Starz Encore (United States)
- MAXstream TV (Indonesia)
- MBC Group
  - MBC2 (MENA)
  - MBC4 (MENA)
  - MBC+ Variety (MENA)
  - MBC Action (MENA)
  - MBC Masr 2 (MENA)
  - MBC Masr (MENA)
  - MBC Masr Drama (MENA)
  - MBC Max (MENA)
  - MBC Bollywood (MENA)
  - MBC Persia (Iran)
- MegaFilm (Pakistan)
- MegaHits (Pakistan)
- MFE
  - Be Mad (Spain)
  - Cine34 (Italy)
  - Iris (Italy)
- Mimyuni Media Entertainment
  - Buddy Star (United Arab Emirates)
  - Cineedge (United Arab Emirates)
  - Originals (United Arab Emirates)
  - Superrix (United Arab Emirates)
  - Uniques (United Arab Emirates)
  - Lucky Family (United Arab Emirates)
  - Screem (United Arab Emirates)
  - Crimes (United Arab Emirates)
  - Comedy Zone (United Arab Emirates)
  - Romance Diary (United Arab Emirates)
  - True Stories (United Arab Emirates)
  - Nikky (United Arab Emirates)
  - Funny Junior (United Arab Emirates)
  - Joy (United Arab Emirates)
- My Cinema Europe (Switzerland)
- Movie Central (Western Canada)
- Movie Room (South Africa)
- Movies Best (Cyprus)
- Mix Hollywood TV
- Majestic Cinema
- Mix One
- MRT 3 (North Macedonia)
- MT Entertainment
  - My Cinema (Indonesia)
  - My Cinema Asia (Indonesia)
  - My Family Channel (Indonesia)
- Narrative Capital
  - Great! Movies (United Kingdom)
  - Great! Action (United Kingdom)
  - Great! Romance (United Kingdom)
- NBCUniversal International Networks
  - Movies 24 (United Kingdom & Ireland)
  - Studio Universal (Africa)
  - Studio Universal (Latin America)
  - Studio Universal (Brazil)
  - Studio Universal (Philippines)
- National Media Authority
  - Nile Cinema Channel (Egypt)
- New World Cinema (Togo)
- NOS/TVCine
  - TVCine Top (Portugal)
  - TVCine Action (Portugal)
  - TVCine Edition (Portugal)
  - TVCine Emotion (Portugal)
  - TVCine Power (Angola & Mozambique)
- Nova
  - NOVA Cinema 1 (Greece & Cyprus)
  - NOVA Cinema 2 (Greece & Cyprus)
  - NOVA Cinema 3 (Greece & Cyprus)
  - NOVA Cinema 4 (Greece & Cyprus)
- Nova Max (Croatia, Bosnia & Herzegovina, Montenegro & Serbia)
- OSN
  - OSNtv Movies Premiere (MENA)
  - OSNtv Movies Horror (MENA)
  - OSNtv Movies Hollywood (MENA)
  - OSNtv Movies Action (MENA)
  - OSNtv Movies Family (MENA)
  - OSNtv Movies Comedy (MENA)
- Panorama Action
- Phoenix Movies Channel (Hong Kong)
- Pink International Company
  - Pink Movies (Serbia)
  - Pink World Cinema (Serbia)
- Pinoy Box Office (Philippines)
- PixL (United States)
- Postimees Group
  - Filmzone (Baltics)
  - Filmzone Plus (Baltics)
  - Kino 7 (Baltics)
- Prima Max (Czechia)
- Rai Movie (Italy)
- Raavi TV (Pakistan)
- RTL Magyarország
  - Film+ (Hungary)
  - Moziklub (Hungary)
- RTSH Film (Albania)
- S7T (MENA)
- SBS9 (Netherlands)
- SBS World Movies (Australia)
- Silver Screen (Pakistan)
- Silverline Movie Channel (Germany)
- Sky (New Zealand)
  - Sky Movies Action (New Zealand)
  - Sky Movies Classics (New Zealand)
  - Sky Movies Collection (New Zealand)
  - Sky Movies Comedy (New Zealand)
  - Sky Movies Family (New Zealand)
  - Sky Movies Greats (New Zealand)
  - Sky Movies Premiere (New Zealand)
- Skydance
  - Cinemax (United States)
  - Colors Bangla Cinema (India)
  - Colors Cineplex (India)
  - Colors Cineplex Bollywood (India)
  - Colors Cineplex Superhits (India)
  - Colors Gujarati Cinema (India)
  - Colors Kannada Cinema (India)
  - Flix (United States)
  - HBO
    - USA
    - Europe
    - Asia
    - Latin America
  - I.Sat (Latin America)
  - Miramax Movie Channel (United States)
  - Paramount Network (United States)
  - Paramount Network (Netherlands)
  - Showtime (United States)
  - Sky Showtime
    - Sky Showtime 1 (Scandinavian, Poland & Romania)
    - Sky Showtime 2 (Scandinavian, Poland & Romania)
  - Space (Latin America)
  - Seevii (MENA)
  - The Movie Channel (United States)
  - TNT (American TV network)
  - TNT (Africa)
  - TNT (Latin American TV channel)
  - Turner Classic Movies
    - USA
    - France
    - MENA
  - TVN Fabuła (Poland)
  - WarnerTV Film (Germany)
  - Warner TV (Latin America)
  - Warner TV (Brazil)
  - Warner TV (Asia)
- Sony Pictures
  - AXN Movies (Portugal)
  - AXN Dublado (Angola & Mozambique)
  - Cine Sony (United States)
  - GetTV (United States)
  - Sony Max (India)
  - Sony Max 2 (India)
  - Sony Movie Channel (United States)
  - Sony Movies (Latin America & Brazil)
  - Sony Pix (India)
  - Sony Wah (India)
- Squirrel Media
  - Squirrel (Spain)
  - Squirrel Dos (Spain)
- StarTimes
  - Startimes Movies (Africa)
  - Startimes Movies Plus (Africa)
- stc
  - stc tv Cinema (Saudi Arabia)
  - stc tv Family (Saudi Arabia)
- Sun TV Network
  - Gemini Movies (South India)
  - KTV (South India)
  - Surya Movies (South India)
  - Udaya Movies (South India)
- Super Channel (Canada)
- Swisscom
  - Blue Action (Switzerland)
  - Blue Retro (Switzerland)
  - Blue Stars (Switzerland)
- Talking Pictures TV (United Kingdom)
- TAP Digital Media Ventures Corporation
  - TAP Movies (Philippines)
  - TAP Action Flix (Philippines)
  - Blast Cinema (Philippines)
  - Blast Action (Philippines)
  - Family Movies (Philippines)
- Telefónica/Movistar Plus+
  - Acción por Movistar Plus+ (Spain)
  - Cine Español por Movistar Plus+ (Spain)
  - Clásicos por Movistar Plus+ (Spain)
  - Comedia por Movistar Plus+ (Spain)
  - Drama por Movistar Plus+ (Spain)
  - Estrenos por Movistar Plus+ (Spain)
  - Hits por Movistar Plus+ (Spain)
  - Indie por Movistar Plus+ (Spain)
- Telekom
  - Magenta Cinema 1 (Greece)
  - Magenta Cinema 2 (Greece)
  - Magenta Cinema 3 (Greece)
- Telenet/Play Media
  - Play More Black (Belgium)
  - Play More Cinema (Belgium)
  - Play More Kicks (Belgium)
- TelevisaUnivision
  - De Película (various countries)
  - Golden (Mexico and Latin America)
  - Golden Edge (Mexico and Latin America)
  - Golden Premier (Mexico and Latin America)
- TF1 Séries Films (France)
- The Cult Movie Network (Canada)
- The Times Group
  - Movies Now (India)
  - MNX (India)
  - MN+ (India)
  - Romedy Now (India)
- Tripar Multivision Plus
  - Galaxy (Indonesia)
  - Galaxy Premium (Indonesia)
  - IMC (Indonesia)
- Trybe TV (Nigeria)
- True Corporation
  - True Film Asia (Thailand)
  - True Movie Hits (Thailand)
  - True Thai Film (Thailand)
- TV2 Csoport
  - Mozi+ (Hungary)
  - Moziverzum (Hungary)
  - Planet 2 (Slovenia)
- TV4 Media
  - Hits (Norway & Denmark)
  - Stars (Norway & Denmark)
  - MTV Aitio (Finland)
  - MTV Viihde (Finland)
  - SF-kanalen (Scandinavian)
  - TV4 Film (Sweden)
  - TV4 Hits (Sweden)
  - TV4 Stars (Sweden)
- One Movies
- Veo7 (Spain)
- Viaplay Group
  - V Film (Scandinavia)
    - V Film Premiere
    - V Film Action
    - V Film Hits
    - V Film Family
- Viasat Russia
  - ViJu TV1000 (Russia)
  - ViJu TV1000 Action (Russia)
  - ViJu TV1000 Russkoe (Russia)
  - ViJu TV Megahit (Russia)
  - ViJu TV Comedy (Russia)
  - ViJu TV Serial (Russia)
  - ViJu TV Premiere (Russia)
- Viasat World
  - Viasat Kino (Romania & Baltics)
  - Viasat Kino Action (Baltics)
  - Viasat Kino Comedy (Baltics)
  - Viasat Kino World (Baltics)
- ViendoMovies (United States)
- Wedo Movies (Germany, Austria and Switzerland)
- Wowow
  - Wowow Cinema (Japan)
  - Cinefil Wowow (Japan)
- yes
  - yes Movies Action (Israel)
  - yes Movies Comedy (Israel)
  - yes Movies Drama (Israel)
  - yes Movies (Israel)
- Zee Entertainment Enterprises
  - Anmol Cinema (India)
  - Anmol Cinema 2 (India)
  - Zee Action (India)
  - Zee Aflam (MENA)
  - Zee Bangla Sonar (India)
  - Zee Bioskop (Indonesia)
  - Zee Biskope (India)
  - Zee Bollywood (India)
  - Zee Bollymovies (Africa)
  - Zee Chitramandir (India)
  - Zee Cinema (Africa, India & United Kingdom)
  - Zee Cinemalu (India)
  - Zee Classic (India)
  - Zee Mundo (Spain)
  - Zee Phim (Vietnam)
  - Zee Power (India)
  - Zee Talkies (India)
  - Zee Theatre (India)
  - Zee Thirai (India)
  - Zee Magic (Africa)
  - Zee One (Africa)
  - & Pictures (India)
  - &xplor HD (India)
