= Film1 Festival =

- Film1 Festival Logo
- Country: Netherlands
- Broadcast area: Netherlands
- Network: Film1
- Headquarters: Amsterdam

Programming
- Language(s): Dutch/English
- Picture format: 576i (PAL) 16:9

Ownership
- Owner: Liberty Global
- Sister channels: Film1 Premiere; Film1 Action; Film1 Family; Film1 Series

History
- Launched: 1 February 2006; 19 years ago
- Closed: 1 March 2012; 13 years ago
- Replaced by: Film1 Sundance
- Former names: Film1.3

Links
- Website: film1.nl

Film1 Festival, formerly known as Film1.3, was a Dutch premium television channel owned by Chellomedia, the European content division of Liberty Global. On 1 March 2012 the channel was replaced by Film1 Sundance. Its main focus was on arthouse films and international productions. Film1 launched together with its sister service Sport1 on 1 February 2006, and replaced the Canal+ Netherlands television channels. Film1 offers multiple channels with Dutch and international film and television series productions. On 25 February 2011 Film1.3 was rebranded into Film1 Festival. On 31 January 2012, Film1 announced that Film1 Festival would be replaced by Film1 Sundance on 1 March 2012.

The channel was available on most digital cable providers, satellite provider CanalDigitaal and IPTV provider Tele2. DVB-T provider Digitenne does not provide Film1.

== See also ==
- Film1
- Television in the Netherlands
- Digital television in the Netherlands
