= Canal+ S.A. =

French media and telecommunications conglomerate

- Formerly: Société d'Édition de Canal Plus (1984-1998)
- Type: Public
- Traded as: LSE: CAN; JSE: CNP
- Industry: Media
- Predecessors: Vivendi Entertainment
- Founded: 1984; 42 years ago
- Founders: André Rousselet; Pierre Lescure
- Headquarters: Issy-les-Moulineaux, France
- Area served: France
- Key people: Yannick Bolloré (chairman); Maxime Saada (CEO)
- Products: Pay TV; Television production Film production & distribution
- Revenue: ▲€6.06 billion (2023)
- Owner: Bolloré (31.4%)
- Number of employees: 7,582 (2023)
- Subsidiaries: StudioCanal; Canal+ Content Benelux & Central Europe; Canal+ Poland (51%); Ciné+ OCS; Dailymotion; M7 Group; MultiChoice; Canal+ Streaming; Viaplay Group (29%); Viu (37.2%)
- Website: www.canalplusgroup.com

Canal+ S.A., formerly Groupe Canal+, is a French media and telecommunications conglomerate based in Paris. It runs its own over-the-top subscription video on-demand service Canal+, subscription TV channels in France, distributes third-party channels and services, and is a major source of finance for domestic film production, participating in the financing of the vast majority of films produced in France. Canal+ was a subsidiary of the French conglomerate Vivendi until 9 December 2024. Since then, the conglomerate has remained 30.4% controlled by the French Bolloré family through the holding company Bolloré.

As part of the spin-off from Vivendi, Groupe Canal+ became the independent entity Canal+ S.A. on 9 December, with a view to listing on the London Stock Exchange on 16 December 2024.

The conglomerate also has its own subsidiary companies with direct involvement in film production and distribution, such as StudioCanal. Apart from extensive operations in mainland France, the company owns many subsidiaries and operates in countries across Europe, Africa, the Asia-Pacific region, and in French overseas territories.

== History ==
=== Subscription channel and production company (1984) ===
First logo, 1984–1995

The subscription channel Canal+ was launched in November 1984, when there were only three government-owned channels available in France. The company was co-founded by André Rousselet, president of the French multinational advertising company Havas, and Pierre Lescure, which proved very popular with media professionals and politicians. There were 186,000 subscribers, who committed to paying 140 francs (21.34 euros) per month for the service.

Alain de Greef (c. 1947 – 29 June 2015) joined in 1986, joining his longtime friend Pierre Lescure. De Greef was first appointed director of production, then head of programmes, and finally as director general (1986–2000). De Greef was later described as a pioneer and visionary, who set the tone and created the "Canal Plus spirit", which embodied anti-conformism along with edgy satire that became very popular. He created the satirical puppet show Les Guignols de l'Info and cult talk shows Nulle part ailleurs, Groland, and Les Deschiens.

The new channel got off to a slow start, and some politicians, including prime minister Laurent Fabius, railed against the idea of having a commercial TV channel. However, Rousselet was a personal friend of the president, François Mitterrand, and so obtained favourable terms for the setup. Pierre Lescure was director-general at that time. A combination of political connections and clever programming – giving the French public American hit comedies and French drama not available on the government channels – worked and subscriptions soon increased. Government regulations required that the channel give several hours of free programming each day, which was used by Canal+ to promote the subscription service.

The channel initially had to use 45% of its air-time on films, until the film industry pushed back. Sports, interview shows, documentaries, and soft pornography joined films as the main staples of programming at this time. In 1985, the government opened up the market to other private commercial television stations, offering some serious competition. However, aggressive marketing and policies ensured that the company kept growing. By 1989, Canal+ had almost three million subscribers. Around this time the company expanded into some European markets, notably Belgium, Spain, and Germany, where in partnership with Bertelsmann and the Kirch Group, the first national pay TV service, Premiere TV, was established. With its expansion into Africa in 1990 with Canal+ Horizons, Canal+ was not only the most successful subscription channel in Europe, but also second only to HBO globally.

In the mid-1980s, Canal+ started acquiring rights to American TV shows and blockbusters, but buying rights from Hollywood was expensive, so the company moved into producing its own films. On 1 January 1987, Canal+ Productions was founded as a cinema film co-production subsidiary of the cable channel, which later partnered with Universal Pictures to co-produce films.

On 1 March 1987, another subsidiary, Ellipse Programs, was established, with the aim of producing television works intended for all broadcasters, which would promote Canal+ producers' talent. On 18 April 1990, Canal+ Horizons was created to export Canal+ content to countries on the African continent. Also in 1987, Canal+ went public.

By December 1990, Canal+ Productions rebranded to Le Studio Canal+, and released its first film, The Double Life of Veronique, by Krzysztof Kieslowski. By the early 1990s, it became apparent that Canal+ was a major contributor to the French film industry, with its obligation to spend 10% of its income on French-made films, as well as being Europe's largest buyer of American film rights. Canal+ also made investments in other companies. In 1991, it bought a five percent stake in the independent American studio Carolco Pictures. However, in 1992, Studio Canal+ suffered financial difficulties after Carolco entered a corporate restructure.

=== Satellite broadcasting (1992) ===
On 6 December 1991, CanalSatellite was created. Canal+ started began satellite broadcasting in 1992, to reach parts of France not covered by cable. Digital satellite provider CanalSatellite was launched as a wholly owned subsidiary of Canal+ on 6 December 1991. On 27 April 1996, Canal+ received two new sister channels: Canal+ Jaune and Canal+ Bleu. In 1999, Canal+ partnered with Vivendi to create V-Net. During the 1990s it also expanded further into Europe and the UK, with BSkyB and TVS. Later it bought up NetHold in the Netherlands, and took majority control of France's NC Numericable (formerly CGV).

In 1994, Rousselet quit the board, and was replaced by director-general Lescure.

In January 1996, Le Studio Canal+ acquired the bankrupted Carolco Pictures' library for $56 million, making its first foray into library acquisitions. It also bought up a film library from UGC DA.

On 27 April 1996, CanalSatellite launched as a digital satellite platform, with 24 channels and interactive services. CANAL+ became available on two additional channels, Canal+ Jaune (Yellow) and Canal+ Bleu (Blue), later named Canal+ Cinema and Canal+ Confort.

On 1 December 1998, all film, television, music, video production activities, etc. were grouped into a new entity, Canal+ Image, which was rebranded as StudioCanal in 2000. On 1 December 1999, a new subsidiary, Canal+ Technologies, was created, to develop and market its access control and interactivity technology.

=== 21st century ===
In January 2000, it was announced that French arms and media conglomerate Lagardère Group had purchased a major stake in the digital television division, taking 34 percent of CanalSatellite and nearly 27.5 percent of MultiThématiques, for a price of more than US$890 million. Lagardère acquired the 30.2% MultiThematiques stake then held by Vivendi. In February 2000, Canal+ announced the merger of its Ellipse Programme TV production company into the programming provider Expand. The company continued to grow as it moved into Internet and multi-access content markets. On 15 June 2001, it took over control of Expand, leading producer of French audiovisual content.

On 9 December 2000, Vivendi acquired Canal+. On 11 December 2000, Vivendi Universal was created from the merger of Canal+, Seagram, and Vivendi. Groupe Canal+, made up of Canal+ Distribution, Canal+ Régie, and the Canal+ channel, was then wholly owned by Vivendi Universal. Legislation required that the channel was held at 49%.

From 2000 to 2002, Virginie Calmels successively held three positions: chief financial officer, deputy CEO, and then joint chief operating officer of the group. In 2001, co-founder Alain De Greef was fired from his position as director-general and replaced by Michel Denisot, when the organisation was restructured under the leadership of Jean-Marie Messier, chief executive of Vivendi. Criticism of Vivendi's poor share performance since the takeover grew, and in April 2002, De Greef's co-founder and CEO Pierre Lescure, clashed with Messier and was fired.

In July 2003, Canal+ through its division StudioExpand announced that they had sold their animation production division Ellipse Animation to media entertainment conglomerate Média-Participations and had placed the acquired animation production subsidiary under their French-Belgian publishing arm Dargaud.

In June 2004 following their sellout of Ellipsanime to Dargaud one year prior, Canal+ Group through StudioExpand announced sold their remaining assets which were Adventure Line Productions who was sold to Tele Images Group, DMD Productions, Calt and KM Production which was sold back to their founders (although the latter would eventually be reunited with Adventure Line four years later in 2008) and Starling was sold to American television production and distribution studio Sony Pictures Television.

On 23 May 2005, CanalSatellite was renamed Canalsat.

An alternative Canal+ logo was used between 2006 and 2009.

Alternative logo, 2006–2009

On 7 December 2010, all Canal+ channels, plus the 90 CanalSat channels, became available live on Microsoft's Xbox 360.

In December 2013, Canal+ announced that they are creating CanalStart, a new structure to support young entrepreneurs' media and new technology initiatives and projects in the form of a financial investment or contracts awarded by Canal+. CanalStart presented at SXSW 2014. In April 2015, CanalStart announced a first commercial partnership with Wildmoka, a start-up specialising in the design of enriched television services, after it won MIPLab 2015, a global B2B startup competition in TV and online video. The company was removed from the companies register on 29 November 2016.

In September 2015, Vincent Bolloré, chairman of parent company Vivendi, was appointed as chairman of Canal Plus. He changed several former executives and aligned Canal+'s operations with Vivendi's.

In May 2019, Groupe Canal+ announced that they've acquires Luxembourg-based French television provider M7 Group who operated pay-TV platforms in Benelux and Central Europe for more than $1.1 billion, thrus expanding Groupe Canal+'s operations into the Benelux and Central Europe territories. The M7 Group acquisition marks Groupe Canal+'s return to the Netherlands country with Canal Digitaal being brought back to their original parent Groupe Canal+.

Canal+ signed an exclusive distribution agreement with Disney in December 2019, ahead of Disney+ launch in France on 31 March 2020. The company would continue to have exclusive rights to Disney content (including the Star Wars and Avengers films), and would also be the only distributor of Disney channels in France. It would also retain its distribution of National Geographic, Voyage, and Fox Play channels.

Canal+ S.A. started trading at London Stock Exchange after its spin-off from Vivendi on 16 December 2024, the shares were trading at 242 pence on that day, down 16% on the opening price of 290 pence.

== Former channels ==
Canal+3D logo (Spain)

Canal+ 3D was established in June 2010, to broadcast some matches of the 2010 FIFA World Cup in 3D. It then only ran a single movie and one live event each month, obtaining 3D content produced in the UK and Spain. As a result of the channel only attracting around 30,000 subscribers, it stopped broadcasting on 24 January 2012. As a consequence of this, transmissions were only receivable on Canal's PVRs, as well as IPTV Networks Free and SFR. However, there were still plans to broadcast 200 hours in 3D for the London 2012 Olympics.

Canal+ Hi-Tech, called Canal+ 16/9 until March 2005, was dedicated to the broadcasting of films in an aspect ratio of 16:9 and high-definition television. The channel was deleted when switching Canal+ to the 16:9 format. (Note: A quick Web search shows mention of this channel in various forums, such as Generation Cable and Regard TV (both 2008), but not much else.)

== Description ==
Canal+ S.A. is headquartered in Issy-les-Moulineaux, in the suburbs of Paris.

The group distributes third-party channels and services, as well as being a major source of finance for domestic film production, participating in the financing of the vast majority of films produced in France. It also has its own subsidiary companies with direct involvement in film production and distribution, StudioCanal. The Wall Street Journal described Canal+ as "the French film industry's biggest financial backer, beloved by French cineastes".

The company purports to have one of the 50 most powerful French brands in the world in 2023, with 26.4 million subscribers in 50 countries around the world. Its production company StudioCanal has 14 production companies in Europe and the US, and holds more than 9,000 titles.

== Governance and people ==
Canal+ S.A. is governed by a dual board system, with a Supervisory Board (Conseil de Surveillance) and an Executive Committee (Comité éxecutif).

As of May 2026, the chairman of the Supervisory Board is Yannick Bolloré.

Executive positions include:

- Maxime Saada: CEO of Canal+ S.A.
- Amandine Ferre: Chief Financial and ESG Officer of Canal+ S.A. and CEO of Canal+ Asia
- Anna Marsh: deputy CEO of Canal+ S.A., CEO of StudioCanal, and Chief Content Officer of Canal+ S.A.
- David Mignot: CEO of Canal+ Africa and CEO of MultiChoice
- Christophe Pinard-Legry: CEO of Canal+ Europe and CEO of Canal+ France (Business)
- Gérald-Brice Viret: CEO of Canal+ France (Programs and Channels)
- Stéphane Baumier: Chief Technology Officer of Canal+ S.A.
- Yassine Bouzoubaa: CEO of Canal+ Benelux and Central Europe
- Audrey Brugère: CEO of L'Olympia
- Pascale Chabert: Chief Content Acquisition Officer of Canal+ S.A.
- Guillaume Clément: CEO of Dailymotion
- Géraldine Gygi Laggiard: Chief Sport Acquisition Officer of Canal+ S.A. and Anti-Piracy Director
- Marc Heler: Chief Strategy Officer of Canal+ S.A.
- Eglatine Leclabart: Chief Global Marketing Officer, PayTV
- Laetitia Menase: General Counsel of Canal+ S.A.
- Emilie Pietrini: Chief Brand and Communication Officer of Canal+ S.A.
- Audrey Richard: Chief People Officer of Canal+ S.A.
- Edyta Sadowska: CEO of Canal+ Poland
- Michel Sibony: Chief Value Officer of Canal+ S.A.
- Anne-Laure Tingry: Chief Data & AI Officer of Canal+ S.A.

== Corporate divisions in France ==
=== Canal+ ===
The flagship brand of the organisation is Canal+, a French premium television channel launched in 1984. It is encrypted for most of the day, and viewers who wish to watch the channel's more popular programming (new-release movies and live sport) must subscribe to the service. Previously this involved the purchase of a decoder to decrypt the signal, but today Canal+ is offered as part of a multi-channel satellite or cable television package.

=== Canal+ (provider and OTT streaming platform) ===
Formerly Canal Satellite Numérique, then Canalsat, a pay satellite and IPTV distributor (as CanalSAT DSL). Canal+ is a satellite TV package launched in 1992 as an extension to the original Canal+ analogue channel. The subscription video on-demand over-the-top streaming service is launched in 2013 as "myCanal", later renamed Canal+.

=== StudioCanal ===
StudioCanal is a production company formed in 1988, associated with NBCUniversal until 2011. Nowadays, StudioCanal is operating in several countries such as Germany, Japan, or Australia. For the movie industry, it is a major player at the European level.

StudioCanal announced in 2011 that it would spend €200 million a year on movie production, establishing its position as "the first port of call outside the U.S. for intelligent upmarket movies" such as Tinker Tailor Soldier Spy, which is fully financed by the studio.

=== Canal+ Distribution ===
Canal+ Distribution (formerly Thema) oversees distribution of Pay TV services, FAST channels, YouTube Channels, and other content to cable, IPTV, and DTH operators and streaming services. As of 2024, it covers over 180 TV channels worldwide and has partnerships with major pay TV platforms in France, Europe, Africa, Middle East, Asia, Canada, Latin America, and the US.

Thema was founded in 2005 by François Thiellet, and acquired by Canal+ in 2014. At this time, it was the parent company of Nollywood TV. From January 2024, it has handled the distribution of Brazilian media giant Globo's offering across Asia, including Japan, South Korea, India, Indonesia, Vietnam and Singapore. There is a subdivision called Thema America that covers Latin America, which in January 2024 partnered with SPI International to offer more channels.

In October 2025, Thema was rebranded into Canal+ Distribution.

== International operations ==
=== Past operations ===
Movie Network, an Australian premium television service launched in 1995, was founded as a partnership between Canal+, HBO (a subsidiary of Time Warner), The Walt Disney Company, MGM/UA and Village Roadshow. A few years later, Canal+ dropped out of the partnership.

Canal Plus was the first cable TV channel to operate in Brazil, in 1989. It operated on the MMDS system and broadcast part of ESPN programming. Its Brazilian operations were sold to Grupo Abril in 1991.

=== Canal+ International ===
Canal+ International is a subsidiary of the group. By 31 December 2023, it had 6.6 million subscribers in over 50 countries across Africa, Europe, Asia-Pacific, and French Overseas Territories in the Caribbean and Indian Ocean regions. As of 2024, Canal+ International also produces over 100 channels for international distribution.

On 15 November 2017, Quebec cable system Videotron began carrying Canal+ International, marking it the first provider to carry the channel. It is also the second attempt at making Canal+ available in Canada since the former paid Canal+ Canada channel on Dailymotion, launched in 2013.

As of August 2018, Canal+ International is on U.S. satellite provider DirecTV in HD on channel 2010.

==== Africa ====
Canal+ Afrique was launched as Canal+ Horizons or Canal Horizons in 1991, initially broadcasting mostly in Tunisia and Senegal. By the end of 2023, it had 8.1 million subscribers. In July 2014, the launch of a new pan-African TV channel - A+ - was announced. Based in Abidjan (Ivory Coast), it aimed to become the leading television company in French-speaking Africa.

The Canal+ Group has other activities in Africa as well as the Canal+ Afrique service; by 2018, the whole group's offerings including over 200 channels, radio stations, and other services, while the Canal+ Afrique's platform offered more than 50 channels. On 10 May 2024, the Canal+ Group bought 200 million shares (45.2% of the capital) in the South African subscription provider MultiChoice, which, with 20 million subscribers, is the market leader in English and Portuguese-speaking Africa with a mandatory offer to acquire remaining shares. Their main competitor on the continent is the Chinese-owned StarTimes; however, estimated audience shares by 2028 are 32 million for Canal+/MultiChoice and 19 million for StarTimes.

After 3 years, Canal+ Ethiopia was shut down by the end of 2024.

In May 2025, the South African Competition Commission recommended that the Competition Tribunal approve the proposed full takeover of MultiChoice by Canal+, provided certain conditions were met. The takeover became effective in September 2025, and is valued at over $2.5 billion.

==== Europe ====
As mentioned above, Canal+ expanded into several European companies in the 1990s, but as of 2016, it was only active in Poland and France, due to many of these divisions being sold to other companies such as Sky Europe and Movistar. Canal+ began returning to European markets outside of France and Poland in 2022 as a streaming service, in countries such as Austria, Czechia, and Slovakia.

Canal Plus came to the Nordic countries in 1997, acquiring the two FilmNet-channels and renaming them. The Nordic part was sold in October 2003 to the Telenor-owned Canal Digital, and the Canal+ brand was used under license until 2012, when the channels were re-branded C More Entertainment.

Canal+ Poland is CANAL+ Group's second largest base in terms of number of subscribers, with 3 million.

Canal Group bought M7 Group in 2019, which has expanded its presence in Europe, which now includes distribution brands in Belgium, Switzerland, the Netherlands, Austria, Germany, the Czech Republic, Slovakia, Hungary, and Romania. M7 is also intending to produce content for broadcast in Europe. The CANAL+ brand now exists in Austria, the Czech Republic, Slovakia, and the Netherlands. In addition, as of 2024, the group owns SPI International, which operates TV channels and digital platforms in many countries, and 29.33% of Swedish streaming service Viaplay.

Canal+ Czechia and Slovakia was launched on 28 February 2023 as a streaming service.

FilmNet in the Netherlands was rebranded as Canal+ in 1997. In 2005, the channels were bought by Liberty Global and renamed Sport1 and Film1 in February 2006. Sport1 changed its name to Ziggo Sport Totaal in November 2015, Film1 was sold to Sony Pictures Television in the same year. In April 2019 was announced by Sony that Film1 would close on 1 August 2019; however, it was sold to SPI International instead, which was fully acquired by Canal+ in August 2023. Canal+ was reintroduced in Netherlands as a streaming service on 20 January 2024.

Canal+ Luxembourg (former M7 Group) is a Luxembourg-based television provider which operates several direct broadcast satellite pay TV platforms: HD Austria in Austria, Télésat in Belgium and Luxembourg, TV Vlaanderen in the Flanders region in Belgium, Skylink in Czech Republic and Slovakia, Canal Digitaal in the Netherlands, Focus Sat in Romania, and Direct One in Hungary. It also operates a terrestrial pay television platform in Flanders, Belgium and offers B2B multimedia services. Canal+ acquired M7 Group for 1.1 billion euros on 12 September 2019.

Past involvement in European services include:

- Canal+ Spain, later known as #0 was launched in 1990 in Spain by Sogecable as an analogue pay channel, similar to the French and Polish version. In 2015 the largest Spanish telecommunications company Telefónica received the approval and closed the acquisition of Canal+ Spain alongside its satellite TV platform, now renamed Movistar Plus+.
- Canal+ Flanders, became Canal+ when FilmNet was bought. Later sold and is now known as Play More (Telenet, a subsidiary of Liberty Global).
- Canal+ Belgique became BeTV when Vivendi sold the service in 2004.
- Canal+ Scandinavia, launched as Canal+ in 1997 with the integration of the FilmNet channels. The company was sold and renamed C More Entertainment, although the brand Canal+ was still used. It was purchased by the SBS Broadcasting Group in 2005, which was merged with ProSiebenSat.1 Media in 2007. In 2008, an agreement was made to sell the channels to TV4 Group. Since 2012, it has been called C More.
- Tele+ Digitale, the Italian branch sold in 2003 to News Corp. and fused with Stream TV, the direct competitor. Later, it became Sky Italia and is owned by Sky Group (a subsidiary of Comcast).
- Premiere, a German premium television channel and platform launched in 1990, was founded by Canal+, Bertelsmann and Kirch. A few years later, Canal+ sold its share of Premiere. It later became Sky Deutschland and is owned by Sky Group (a subsidiary of Comcast).
- Канал+, a one day only block of programming broadcast on the night of July 14, 1990 on the Soviet Union's main channel, Programme One. The event went as far as to include French commercials, dubed over in Russian.

==== Asia-Pacific ====
In May 2009, K+ founded by Canal+ and VTV was launched. K+ brings national level satellite TV service and OTT service to Vietnamese households, offering five premium and exclusive channels, up to 170 SD channels and HD channels across genres: sports (including the Premier League), movies, general entertainment, news, music, and documentaries. K+ ceased its activities on January 1st, 2026.

Canal+ Myanmar, originally launched by Forever Group as 4TV in 2006, became a joint venture with Canal+ Group in 2017. Canal+ has been operating in Myanmar in collaboration with Forever since 2018.

In June 2023, Canal+ partnered with PCCW to expand the streaming service Viu, which serves Asia and the Middle East, and in February 2024, Canal+ increased its stake in Viu to 30%. Also in 2023, CANAL+ also partnered with the Onati group to broadcast its content in Polynesia.

==== French Overseas Territories ====
Canal+ Group has 800,000 subscribers in the French Overseas Territories, with Canal+ International's subsidiaries operating in the Caribbean (Antilles, French Guiana, and Haiti); the Indian Ocean (Réunion, Mayotte, and Mauritius) and the Pacific (New Caledonia, Wallis and Futuna, and French Polynesia).

== Channels in France ==
- Canal+ Cinéma(s) – premium TV channel devoted to movies
- Canal+ Sport – premium TV channel devoted to sports programmes
- Canal+ Kids – premium TV channel devoted to family programming
- Canal+ Docs – cable TV channel devoted to documentaries
- Canal+ Grand Écran
- Canal+ Foot
- Canal+ Sport 360 – premium TV channel, delayed broadcast of Sport from Canal+
- Canal+ Box Office
- Canal+ Live – cable TV channel devoted to live sports coverage
- Canal+ Premier League
- Ciné+ OCS – set of six thematic movies and series television channels
- Comédie+ (formerly Comédie!) – cable TV channel devoted to humour
- Europe 2 Pop TV – cable TV channel devoted to only French-language music videos from the 1980s to nowadays
- Golf+ – cable TV channel devoted to golf
- Infosport+ – cable TV news channel devoted to sports
- Piwi+ (formerly Piwi) – cable TV channel devoted to preschool programs
- Planète+ – cable TV channel devoted to documentaries
- Planète+ Aventure – cable TV channel devoted to adventure documentaries
- Planète+ Crime– cable TV channel devoted to crime documentaries
- Polar+ – cable TV channel devoted to crime TV series
- Seasons – cable TV channel devoted to documentaries in the hunting and fishing niche
- Télétoon+ (formerly Télétoon) – cable TV channel devoted to animation
- CNews (formerly i>Télé) – free-to-air news channel
- CStar – free-to-air channel with a musical predominant
- MyCanal, now CANAL+ – streaming service for Canal+ subscribers to stream the provider's channels live and on-demand, and as well as a free service for Canal+ free-to-air channels
- Canal+ International – international French premium channel in North America featuring programming from Canal+ and its various other channels
- CNews Prime – cable TV news channel
- Europe 1 TV – cable TV visual radio

== Other divisions ==
- Canal+ Benelux & Central Europe – television service provider based in Luxembourg
  - Canal+ – subscription video on-demand streaming service derived from MyCanal service (Netherlands, Austria, Hungary, Czech Republic and Slovakia)
  - Canal Digitaal (Netherlands)
  - Focus Sat (Romania)
  - HD Austria (Austria)
  - Online.nl (Netherlands)
  - Skylink (Czech Republic, Slovakia)
  - Télésat (Belgium, Luxembourg)
  - TV Vlaanderen (Flemish community in Belgium)
- StudioCanal – film producer and distributor
  - StudioCanal Home Entertainment (North America, the United Kingdom and Ireland)
  - SAM Productions (Scandinavian)
  - Arthaus (Germany)
  - Red Production Company (United Kingdom)
  - Tandem Productions (Germany)
- Canal+ Content Benelux & Central Europe
  - Dizi
  - Film1
  - Filmbox+
  - Kino Polska
  - MediaBox Broadcasting International - themed television channels such as DocuBox, FashionBox, FightBox and FunBox.
  - Stopklatka
  - Zoom TV
- Canal+ Brand Solutions – advertising network for the group channels and the cinema operator UGC
