= Film1 Sundance =

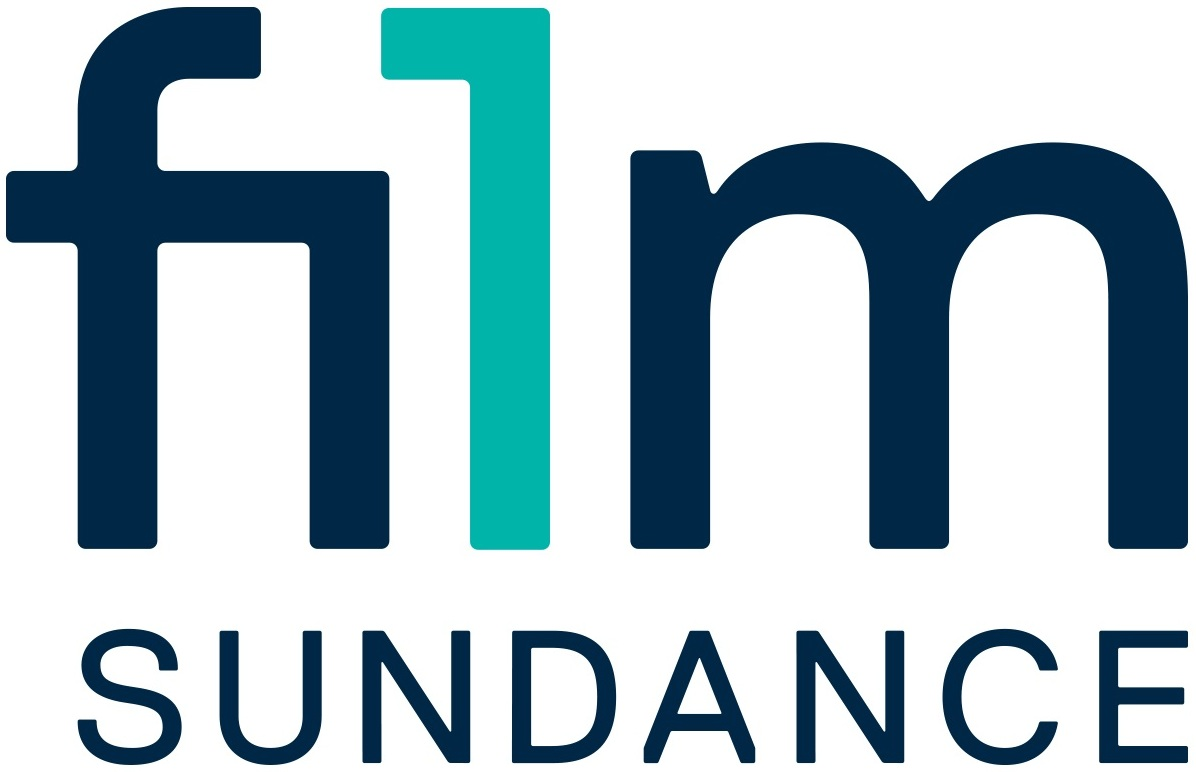
- Country: Netherlands
- Broadcast area: Netherlands
- Network: Film1
- Headquarters: Amsterdam

Programming
- Language: Dutch/English
- Picture format: 576i (PAL) 16:9 SDTV; 1080i (HDTV)

Ownership
- Owner: Liberty Global (2012-2015); Sony Pictures Television (2015-2017)
- Sister channels: Film1 Premiere; Film1 Action; Film1 Family; Film1 Drama

History
- Launched: 1 March 2012; 14 years ago
- Replaced: Film1 Festival
- Closed: 31 August 2017; 9 years ago

Links
- Website: http://www.film1.nl

Film1 Sundance (also called Film1 Sundance Channel) was a Dutch premium television channel. It was the Dutch version of the American cable television network SundanceTV devoted to airing independent feature films, world cinema, documentaries, short films, television series, and original programs, such as news about the latest developments from each year's Sundance Film Festival.

The channel launched on 1 March 2012 and replaced the television channel Film1 Festival. All films were shown uncut and without commercial interruptions.

== History ==
Launched in the United States in February 1996 to show independent films on television, Sundance Channel was a joint venture of Showtime Networks (part of CBS Corporation), Universal Studios (part of NBCUniversal), and Robert Redford who also acted as the creative director of the network. The channel initially launched on five cable systems in New York City; Los Angeles; Alexandria, Virginia; Chamblee, Georgia; and Pensacola, Florida

On 7 May 2008, Rainbow Media (a subsidiary of Cablevision) announced that it had purchased Sundance Channel for $496 million. Rainbow Media also owns the cable channels AMC, IFC, WE tv, and News 12, and owned the defunct Voom HD Networks. The acquisition of Sundance Channel by Rainbow Media was completed in June 2008.

On 31 January 2012, Film1 (a then-subsidiary of Liberty Global) announced that it would launch Sundance Channel in the Netherlands. It replaced Film1 Festival.

Film1 closed Film1 Sundance on 31 August 2017. The premium television service wants to focus more on its video-on-demand services.

== See also ==
- SundanceTV
- Sundance Channel (Canada)
- Film1
