= Sundance Channel =

Sundance Channel can refer to:

- Sundance TV, formerly known as Sundance Channel (United States).
- Sundance Channel (Canada)
- Sundance Channel (Netherlands)
- Sundance Channel (Europe)
- Sundance Channel (Iberia)
- Sundance Channel (Asia)
- Sundance Channel (Turkey)
