= Joyne =

Dutch/Flemish satellite television company

- Type: Private
- Industry: Subscription Television
- Founded: 11 July 2017; 9 years ago
- Founder: Peter van der Meer, Rolf Edens, Hans Schellingerhout, Jur Bron
- Defunct: 9 April 2021; 5 years ago (bankruptcy)
- Headquarters: Baarn Drachten, Netherlands
- Area served: Netherlands; Flanders
- Key people: Peter van der Meer, Rolf Edens, Hans Schellingerhout, Jur Bron, Piet Smid, Johrit Schellingerhout
- Products: Direct broadcast satellite
- Total equity: debt of 6 millions euros (2021)
- Owner: Peter van der Meer, Rolf Edens, Hans Schellingerhout, Jur Bron
- Website: www.joyne.nl - www.joyne.be

Joyne was a provider of digital television via satellite for the Dutch and Flemish market, using the Eutelsat's 9B satellites at 9°E east. Joyne is a combination of the words Joy and join For most channels a smartcard was required to decrypt the Conax signal. On 9 April 2021 Joyne went bankrupt. Bankruptcy was requested by Eutelsat. On 19 April 2021 it was announced Canal+ Luxembourg took over certain assets. Customers were offered to move to Canal Digitaal and TV Vlaanderen's offer. Some channels offered formerly by Joyne continued broadcasting on Eutelsat 9B until 31 July 2021. Some other channels including channels owned by Discovery have ceased broadcast on 19 April 2021.

== See also ==
- Television in the Netherlands
- Digital television in the Netherlands
