= Canal+ Content Benelux & Central Europe =

Media company

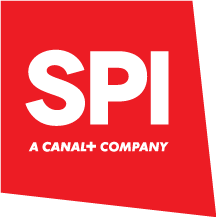
- Formerly: SPI International (1993–2026)
- Industry: Media
- Founded: December 23, 1993; 32 years ago (as SPI International); October 12, 2026; 4 days ago (as Canal+ Content Benelux & Central Europe)
- Founder: Loni Farhi
- Headquarters: The Hague, Netherlands
- Number of employees: 300 (2024)
- Parent: Canal+
- Website: spiintl.com

Canal+ Content Benelux & Central Europe (formerly SPI International) is an international media company based in the Netherlands. It is owned by Canal+ S.A.. It operates 42 TV channels, multiple digital products across six continents, and is a major player in content distribution and broadcasting worldwide.

The company operates multiple free to air and pay TV channels in CEE, Western Europe, CIS and Adria regions including key European markets such as Poland, Czechia, Romania, Serbia, and the Netherlands.

Canal’s brands include FilmBox+ and Dizi streaming services. SPI also owns and operates the brand assets of Film1 premium movie services in The Netherlands, including four linear channels and an on-demand service.

== Brands and Companies ==
- FilmBox International - U.K.-based broadcaster of FilmBox brand movie channels.
- Kino Polska Group - One of the leading media groups in Poland, successfully operating also on international markets. The Group distributes and produces content for television, VOD platforms and cinemas, as well as sells programme licenses. It is also a broadcaster of thematic TV channels, distributed on digital terrestrial television, in cable networks and on satellite platforms. The Group's portfolio includes such television channels as Stopklatka, Zoom, Kino Polska, Kino Polska Muzyka, Kino TV, Gametoon and DIZI as well as FilmBox brand premium channels.
- Stopklatka SA - Owns the Stopklatka channel. Stopklatka is a film and series channel, which presents a full cross-section of Polish and world cinema – from Hollywood hits through films awarded at festivals to the best comedies and classics of action movies.
- MediaBox Broadcasting International - Broadcaster of worldwide thematic television channels such as DocuBox, FashionBox, FightBox, FunBox UHD, 360 TuneBox and Fast&FunBox, also based in the UK.

== History ==
In 2019, SPI bought Film1 from Sony Pictures Television. Film1 operates four movie channels in the Netherlands - Film1 Action, Film1 Drama, Film1 Family, Film1 Premiere and an on-demand service.

In March 2022, the French media company Canal+ Group acquired a 70% stake in the company. In August 2023, it was announced Canal+ Group had acquired the remaining 30% of SPI, taking full control of the company.

In October 2026, it was announced that SPI International had rebranded to Canal+ Content Benelux & Central Europe.
