= Canal+ Benelux and Central Europe =

Luxembourg television provider

Canal+ Luxembourg S.à.r.l.
- Trade name: Canal+ Benelux and Central Europe
- Type: Subsidiary
- Industry: Media
- Predecessors: M7 Group S.A.; UPC DTH S.à.r.l.
- Founded: October 2009
- Headquarters: Luxembourg
- Area served: Austria, Belgium, Czech Republic, Germany, Hungary, Netherlands, Romania, Slovakia
- Key people: Yassine Bouzoubaa (CEO)
- Brands: Canal Digitaal; Canal+ Magyarország; Focus Sat; Canal+ Austria; Online.nl; Canal+ (Nederland); Skylink; Télésat; TV Vlaanderen
- Services: Pay TV; Satellite television; Terrestrial television; Streaming television; Broadcasting; IPTV
- Revenue: €318.9 million (2018)
- Number of employees: 180
- Parent: Astorg (2014–2019); Canal+ (2019–present)
- Website: www.canalplusgroup.com/en/group/europe-2

Canal+ Luxembourg S.à.r.l. (trade name: Canal+ Benelux & Central Europe) is a Luxembourg-based television provider owned by the Canal+ S.A. known earlier as M7 and M7 Group.

It operates several direct broadcast satellite pay TV platforms: Canal+ Austria in Austria, Télésat in Belgium and Luxembourg, TV Vlaanderen in the Flanders region in Belgium, Skylink in Czech Republic and Slovakia, Canal+ Magyarország in Hungary, Canal Digitaal, Canal+ (ott/streaming) and Online.nl in the Netherlands, and Focus Sat in Romania. It also operates a terrestrial pay television platform in Flanders, Belgium, and offers B2B multimedia services.

Groupe Canal+ bought the company in 2019, and Canal+ Benelux & Central Europe has been rebranding some of its services as Canal+ since 29 January 2024.

== History ==
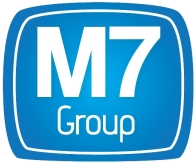
M7 Group previous logo

The private equity firm Astorg acquired a majority of the company in July 2014 for €350 million via its Fund V from Providence and Airbridge Investments. Providence is a Private Equity investment firm and Airbridge Investments is the holding company of executives Hans Wolfert and Cees Bohnenn. In December 2017, the company became fully owned by Astorg. The exit of minority shareholders took place at the time of a €570 million debt refinancing which allowed to pay a dividend of €175 million to the former shareholders.

On 30 July 2014, its subsidiary M7 Deutschland bought the German B2B satellite platform Kabelkiosk from Eutelsat.

In 2016, M7 Group closed the Hungarian satellite platform Hello HD.

In December 2018, the company announced the purchase of Liberty Global's satellite operations located in Czech Republic, Slovakia, Hungary and Romania for €180 million. This sale was processed after necessary permissions, in spring 2019. Freesat platform acquired in the Czech Republic and Slovakia has been integrated into Skylink.

On 28 May 2019, it was announced that Vivendi's Canal+ Group would acquire M7 Group for 1.1 billion €. The sale was effectuated on 12 September 2019 after the European Commission gave its permission.

M7 Group announced that Diveo, the German satellite platform which was launched in February 2018, will be closed on 30 November 2019. In July 2020, M7 Group S.A. merged with UPC DTH S.à.r.l. and changed its official name into Canal+ Luxembourg S.à.r.l. The M7 brand name remains in use with the "A Canal+ Group company" tagline.

Groupe Canal+ bought the company in 2019, although retains its own name. M7 has been rebranding as Canal+ from 29 January 2024.

In November 2025, the Hungarian satellite TV operation of Direct One was sold to 4iG. A day later, on December 1, 2025, the Hungarian live TV operation was integrated into Canal+.
