= John (film) =

2023 American LGBTQ+ drama film

- Theatrical film poster
- Directed by: Le Han
- Written by: Le Han
- Produced by: Joseph Hieu
- Starring: Sebastian Perez; Ron Bregenzer; Celine Jackson
- Cinematography: Bryan Cameron
- Edited by: Bryan Cameron
- Release date: October 2, 2023 (SF3 Fest)
- Running time: 100 minutes
- Country: United States
- Language: English

John is a 2023 American LGBTQ+ drama film, directed and written by Le Han. The film stars Sebastian Perez, Celine Jackson, and Ron Bregenzer. It premiered at the SF3 Feature Film Festival in 2023.

== Synopsis ==
The movie tells the struggling story of LGBTQ sex workers in Hollywood, LA, inspired by the Italian neorealism and the French New Wave.

== Cast ==
- Sebastian Perez as John
- Ron Bregenzer as Wade
- Celine Jackson as Peaches
- Seth Hafley as Miguel
- Toren Holtz as Jimmy
- Arlan Yerby as Diego
- Cameron Showalter as Emilio
- Luis Sanchez as Louis

== Reception ==
IndieWrap praised the film: "Ever gritty and unrelenting, [this film] does a great job of telling a tragic story without resorting to melodrama or sentimentality. Ultimately it is an experimental film that specifically never tries to be eloquent nor refined." With a 4.1/5 star score, Filmnet lauded the acting: "The film also benefits immensely from the compelling performances of its cast, particularly the characters Peaches and Miguel, who bring both resilience and vulnerability to their roles, adding layers of nuance to the narrative."
