= Cinecanal Classics =

Latin American movie channel

Cinecanal Classics was a Latin American panregional premium movie channel operated by LAPTV, an American company. Its programming was entirely dedicated to classic Hollywood movies. In 2009 it was replaced by CityStars.
