= Filmnet =

FilmNet
- An old FilmNet logo

Ownership
- Owner: NetHold (since 1996); Esselte Video; Rob Houwer; ATN (VNU/United International Pictures (Paramount Pictures/Universal Pictures)

History
- Launched: 29 March 1985; 41 years ago
- Closed: 1 August 1997; 29 years ago (Scandinavia, Netherlands, Flanders, Poland, Czech Republic, Hungary); 1 June 2008; 18 years ago (Greece)
- Replaced by: Canal+ (Scandinavia, Netherlands, Flanders, Poland); Nova Cinema (Greece)

FilmNet was the name used for several premium television channels in Europe during the 1980s, 1990s and 2000s. It was launched on 9 March 1985, broadcasting with a focus on Scandinavia, the Netherlands and the northern part of Belgium (Flanders). FilmNet channels were later launched in Poland, Czech Republic, Hungary and Greece.

== History ==
Filmnet was founded by the Swedish company Esselte Video, a division of Swedish office supply manufacturer Esselte, and Dutch film producer Rob Houwer. They formed a partnership with ATN, a joint venture of the Dutch magazine publisher VNU and the European film distribution company United International Pictures and the channel was launched across Scandinavia and the Benelux countries on 29 March 1985. FilmNet transmitted from the ECS-1 satellite, the same satellite used by cable operators.

FilmNet failed to make a profit and was sold to NetHold, a joint venture of the South African MultiChoice company and Richemont, in 1996. The channels were sold to the French Groupe Canal+ on 1 August 1997. The deal didn't include the Greek channels, who continued using the FilmNet name until 2008. Although the brand no longer exists, most of its subsidiaries in the different countries live on in some way:

- Scandinavia: The channel had 3 timeslots: Morning Club for morning, noon and early afternoon programs, Royal Club for late afternoon and evening programs and Night Club for night and after-midnight programs, each broadcasting for 8 hours. As it was increasing other content except for films, like sports, entertainment, music and others, the channel was renamed FilmNet Plus. To create a TV channel which would fit to film lovers, a second FilmNet channel called The Complete Movie Channel: FilmNet was launched on most cable networks, and it featured only movies. Later, the channels were renamed FilmNet 1 and FilmNet 2. The channels were renamed Canal+ and Canal+ Gul on September 1, 1997. Canal+ sold the company to Nordic Capital and Baker Capital in 2003 and the company was renamed C More Entertainment (although still using the Canal+ name in marketing until 2012). They went on to sell to the SBS Broadcasting Group in 2005, who in turn was merged with ProSiebenSat.1 Media in 2007. In 2008, a deal was entered to sell the company to the Swedish TV4 Group. In October 2012, C More launched a subscription online streaming service under the FilmNet name, which was moved to main C More websites on 30 June 2015.
- Netherlands: FilmNet was rebranded as Canal+ in 1997. Canal+ sold the channels in 2005 to Liberty Global and renamed to Sport1 and Film1 in February 2006. Sport1 changed its name to Ziggo Sport Totaal in November 2015. Film1 was sold to Sony Pictures Television in 2015.
- Belgium: The Belgian subsidiary was one of the most successful: as from mid 1988 it was profitable; early 1995 it had 186,000 subscribers. The channels were bought by and renamed Canal+ in 1997. In 2004, they were sold to Telenet and are now known as Play More. The office of FilmNet was located in Brussels.
- Poland: FilmNet was launched in 1995 and merged into the existing Canal+ channel in February 1997. It continues to exist to this day, under the name Canal+ Premium.
- Greece: The FilmNet brand came in Greece in 1994, replacing ITA 8. The second channel was called FilmSat, but during 2002 it was renamed as FilmNet 2 and there was, also, a third one, called FilmNet 3. Multichoice finally sold their Greek pay-TV business to Forthnet in April 2008. The FilmNet brand disappeared on June 1, 2008, when the Greek channels were renamed Nova Cinema.

== Programming ==
FilmNet mainly broadcast films and series, as well as gossip news from E!. In the 1990s, FilmNet also started broadcasting football and other sport events in countries such as Belgium and the Netherlands.

=== K-T.V. ===
K-T.V. was a programming block on FilmNet, featuring various cartoons and original shows with kids as the presentations.

== See also ==
- K-T.V.
- SuperSport
