= Focus Sat =

Romanian TV company

- Type: Subsidiary
- Industry: Telecommunications
- Founded: December 2004
- Headquarters: Bucharest, Romania
- Products: Direct to home (DTH); Over the top (OTT)
- Services: Satellite television; Streaming television; Over-the-top media service
- Owner: Focus Sat Ltd. (2004–2006) Liberty Global (2006–2019) Canal+ (2019–present)
- Website: www.focussat.ro

Focus Sat is a Romanian direct-to-home (DTH) satellite television platform and an online television service, operated as a registered brand of CANAL+. Through the FOCUS+ application, customers can watch live TV channels and video-on-demand content on smart devices, including across the European Union. It was the first DTH operator in Romania, launched in 2004, and was acquired by Liberty Global in 2006 before being sold to M7 Group in 2018.

== History ==
Focus Sat is the first DTH operator on the Romanian telecommunications market. It was launched in November 2004 and was owned by the majority shareholder Focus Sat Limited (a British company) and several Romanian shareholders. Liberty Global (then UnitedGlobalCom) bought 50% of the shares on 19 May 2005 and launched the service and the commercial offer on 5 July 2005. On 11 April 2006, Focus Sat became a full subsidiary of Liberty Global.

In February 2010, Liberty Global International established a division for satellite TV transmission for Central Europe, named UPC DTH and based in Howald, Luxembourg. The company managed operations in the Czech Republic and Slovakia under the name freeSAT, in Hungary under the name UPC Direct, and in Romania under the name Focus Sat.

In December 2018, Focus Sat was acquired by M7 Group, a company based in Luxembourg, and from 27 May 2019 it became part of Canal+ Luxembourg following the acquisition of M7 Group by Canal+ Group. The merger expanded Canal+’s European footprint to Germany, the Netherlands, Belgium, Austria, the Czech Republic, Slovakia, Hungary and Romania.

As part of Canal+ Luxembourg, Focus Sat diversified its product portfolio:

- new satellite TV packages with an innovative, incremental structure and varied content/price options for a diverse and modern audience, with emphasis on freedom of choice;
- new online TV packages from the Focus Sat application, later renamed FOCUS+, an interactive service that offers access to live TV channels and premium VOD content and can be viewed on any smart device, anytime, from anywhere in the European Union.

Groupe Canal+

Founded as a French subscription-TV channel 40 years ago, CANAL+ is now a global media and entertainment company. The group has 26.9 million subscribers worldwide, over 400 million monthly active users on its OTT and video streaming platforms, and a total of more than 9,000 employees. It generates revenues in 195 countries and operates directly in 52 countries, with leading positions in pay-TV in 20 of them. CANAL+ operates across the entire audiovisual value chain, including production, broadcast, distribution and aggregation.

It is home to STUDIOCANAL, a leading film and television studio with worldwide production and distribution capabilities; Doilymotion, one of the world's largest short-form video streaming platforms; Thema, a production and distribution company specializing in creating and distributing diverse content and channels; and telecommunication services, through GVA in Africa and CANAL+ Telecom in the French overseas jurisdictions and territories. It also operates the iconic performance venues L'OIympia and Le Théâtre de l'Œuvre in France and CanalOlympia in Africa.

CANAL+ also has equity stakes across Africa, Europe and Asia, namely in MultiChoice (the Pay-TV leader in English and Portuguese-speaking Africa), Viaplay (the Pay- TV leader in Scandinavia) and Viu (a leading OTT platform in Southern-Asia).
