= Digital television in the Netherlands =

Broadcast digital television in the Netherlands is available in three major forms: terrestrial (DVB-T and DVB-T2), cable (DVB-C), and satellite (DVB-S). In addition, IPTV services are available. At the end of the first quarter of 2013 almost 84% of the households in the Netherlands had some form of digital television.

== Terrestrial ==
After tests held in 2002, digital terrestrial television in the Netherlands was launched on April 23, 2003 by Digitenne, the main Dutch digital television platform owned by KPN. The Netherlands was the second European country to complete the move to digital terrestrial broadcasting on December 11, 2006. The switch-off was helped greatly by the fact that about 90% of the households have cable that continues to use analog distribution. Due to the very extensive penetration of cable systems, usage of terrestrial television in the Netherlands is largely confined to remote rural areas and for portable televisions in caravans, etc.

Since then all terrestrial television broadcast in the Netherlands are digital. The national public television channels NPO 1, NPO 2, NPO 3 and the regional public television channels are free-to-air.

DVB-T2 transmissions in the Netherlands are provided commercially by KPN daughter company Digitenne. They offer 25 TV channels and 16 radio channels, including the free-to-air channels. The Digitenne service uses Conax encryption.

=== Handheld ===
KPN launched a DVB-H service MobileTV on Thursday, June 5, 2008 with a bouquet of ten channels. The ten channels are NPO 1, NPO 3, RTL 4, RTL 24, SBS6, Disney XD (Netherlands)/Veronica, MTV, Discovery Channel, Xite and Nick Toons. RTL24 is a made-for-mobile channel with news and current affair. Xite is a new Dutch music channel. In November 2008, a new dedicated mobile TV channel was added. Nu.tv from Ilse Media and the nu.nl news web site. The service was closed on June 1, 2011, KPN is now using the freed up capacity for adding new channels to its Digitenne DTT platform.

== Cable ==
Over 90% of the households in the Netherlands receive their television signal by cable, making it one of the highest cable penetrated countries. Some cable viewers still watch analogue because no set-top box is necessary. But with the uptake of LCD and plasma televisions customers are looking for better picture quality in digital cable. In addition digital cable offers hundreds of channels compared to the about thirty channels analogue cable offers.

All the major cable companies in the Netherlands offer a digital television service. They all use the DVB-C standard for their digital signal but use different encryption techniques, most used are Irdeto 2 and Nagravision. The largest cable company, Ziggo, supports the CI+ standard making it possible for their customers to use televisions with an integrated digital tuner without the need for an additional set-top-box. All cable companies offer a number of high-definition channels. The most watched channels are being transmitted in the clear on the Ziggo and Caiway digital cable networks.

The three largest cable companies in the Netherlands are:

- Ziggo
- Caiway
- DELTA

== Satellite ==
Digital satellite television in the Netherlands is available via CanalDigitaal, using the SES' Astra satellites at 19.2° east and 23.5° east. Services from both satellite positions can be received using a single dish with a Duo LNB, specifically designed for this purpose.

It is only possible to register as a customer of CanalDigitaal using a Dutch postal address, due to copyright restrictions. A standard DVB-S receiver is used, which can also receive other free-to-air broadcasts. CanalDigitaal uses the Mediaguard/Nagravision encryption.

A second provider of digital satellite television named Joyne began its services in 2017, but went bankrupt in 2021. Joyne used Eutelsat's Eurobird satellites at 9° east.

== IPTV ==
Since May 1, 2006 KPN offers Mine TV, an IPTV service based on their DSL service, with the ability to receive Video on demand and replay a missed TV episodes besides regular TV programming. During 2007, the KPN service was renamed KPN Interactieve TV.

Tele2 also offers an IPTV service called Tele2Vision. Since mid-2008 XMSNET also has started the rollout of IPTV over their FTTH (Fiber To The Home) network in several cities in the Netherlands.

== High definition ==
In the Netherlands customers can receive high-definition television channels by cable or satellite and DVB-T2.

=== History ===
The first trials with high-definition television in the Netherlands began in the summer of 2006 with the broadcast of the 2006 World Cup in HD. The games where broadcast by the Netherlands Public Broadcasting (NPO) broadcaster NOS on a temporary 720p HD version of the NPO 2 channel. Only the live games where broadcast in HD, images from the studio and interviews were still SD. The NPO 2 HD channel went off-air after the World Cup. The larger cable companies continued a HD service with a small number of general interest channels like Discovery HD and National Geographic Channel HD. But because no Dutch network had made the move to HD, already broadcast in widescreen and the quality of the standard-definition PAL signal was good enough for most people, demand was low.

Since the 2006 trials none of the main Dutch networks made the move to HD until the summer of 2008 when from June 1 until August 24, 2008 the NPO made their primary channel, NPO 1 temporary available in HD. This made it possible to broadcast Euro 2008, the 2008 Tour de France, and the 2008 Summer Olympics in HD and additionally allowed them to test their systems before the scheduled launch of their permanent HD service. Technicolor Netherlands, the company responsible for the technical realisation of the broadcasts for all the NPOs television and radio channels, began the summer 2008 test broadcast of NPO 1 HD in 720p and by doing so following the European Broadcasting Union (EBU) recommendations for HD broadcasting. During the test period an additional 1080i version of the channel was made available to the cable companies because of quality complaints from viewers.

On July 4, 2009 the NPO started their permanent HD service when all three channels, NPO 1, NPO 2, and NPO 3, began simulcasting in 1080i high-definition. Most programming in the early stages is upscaled as in time more programs will become available in native HD.

On October 15, 2009 RTL Nederland started simulcasting their RTL 7 and RTL 8 channels in 1080i high-definition. RTL Nederland then also announced plans for HD versions of their two other channels, RTL 4 and RTL 5, for 2010. Also these are available in HD since then.

=== Current ===
The Netherlands has ten main television channels, three public and seven commercial. All main television channels are simulcasted in high-definition. Furthermore other general interest high-definition channels are available with Dutch audio or subtitles.

Main Dutch channels that broadcast in HD:

- NPO 1 (started 4 July 2009)
- NPO 2 (started 4 July 2009)
- NPO 3 (started 4 July 2009)
- RTL 4 (started 2010)
- RTL 5 (started 2010)
- RTL 7 (started 15 October 2009)
- RTL 8 (started 15 October 2009)
- RTL Z (started 7 September 2015)
- SBS6 (started 2010)
- Veronica (started 2010)
- Net5 (started 2010)
- SBS9 (started 2014)
- Star Channel (started 2013)

Other HD channels available in the Nederlands:

- 24Kitchen HD
- Al Jazeera English HD
- Animal Planet HD
- BBC NL HD
- BBC News HD
- Canal+ Action HD
- Cartoonito HD
- Cartoon Network HD
- CNN HD
- Comedy Central HD
- Crime & Investigation HD
- DanceTelevision HD
- Discovery HD
- Discovery Science HD
- Disney Channel HD
- Disney Jr. HD
- E! Entertainment HD
- ESPN HD
- ESPN2 HD
- ESPN3 HD
- ESPN4 HD
- Euronews HD
- Eurosport 1 HD
- Eurosport 2 HD
- Family 7 HD
- Fashion TV HD
- Film1 Premiere HD
- Film1 Action HD
- Film1 Family HD
- Film1 Drama HD
- History HD
- Horse & Country TV HD
- Investigation Discovery HD
- Love Nature HD
- MTV HD
- myZen.tv HD
- National Geographic HD
- National Geographic Wild HD
- Nickelodeon HD
- OutTV HD
- Paramount Network HD
- RTL Crime HD
- RTL Lounge HD
- RTL Telekids HD
- ShortsTV HD
- Stingray Classica HD
- Stingray Djazz HD
- Stingray iConcerts HD
- TLC HD
- TV 538 HD
- Viaplay TV HD
- Viaplay TV+ HD
- Xite HD
- Ziggo Sport HD
- Ziggo Sport 2 HD
- Ziggo Sport 3 HD
- Ziggo Sport 4 HD
- Ziggo Sport 5 HD
- Ziggo Sport 6 HD

Also available on most platforms:

- BBC One HD
- BBC Two HD
- VRT 1 HD
- VRT Canvas HD
- Ketnet HD
- Das Erste HD
- ZDF HD
- Arte HD
- TV5 Monde HD

Satellite viewers can receive a number of additional HD channels from the surrounding countries when broadcasting free-to-air. But most of these channels are not part of HD services offered in the Netherlands nor broadcast programming aimed at the Dutch market.

== See also ==
- Digital television transition
- Television in the Netherlands
- List of cable companies in the Netherlands
- SES satellite operator
- Astra satellite family
- Digital television
- High-definition television
