= DocuBox =

European TV channel

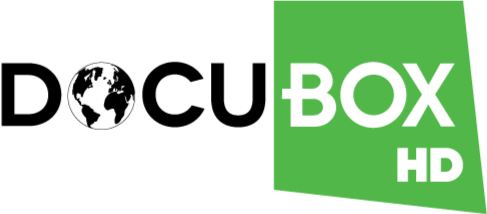
- Broadcast area: Worldwide

Programming
- Languages: English; French; Polish; Romanian; Russian
- Picture format: 1080i HDTV (downscaled to 16:9 576i for the SDTV feed)

Ownership
- Owner: SPI International; Canal+ Group
- Sister channels: 360TuneBox; FashionBox; Fast&FunBox; FightBox; FilmBox; FunBox

History
- Launched: 2011; 15 years ago

DocuBox is a European premium television channel and video on demand service owned by SPI International, a division of Canal+ Group. It features documentary films covering nature, science, culture and human civilization.

== History ==
DocuBox first launched in 2011.

DocuBox launched in the Netherlands on 3 May 2021.

On October 10, 2025 Dutch regulator Commissariaat voor de Media granded DocuBox Poland license. On December 1 2025 DocuBox Europe with polish audiotrack was replaced by DocuBox Poland which started broadcasting ads on January 5 2026.
