= Sundance TV =

American digital cable and satellite television network

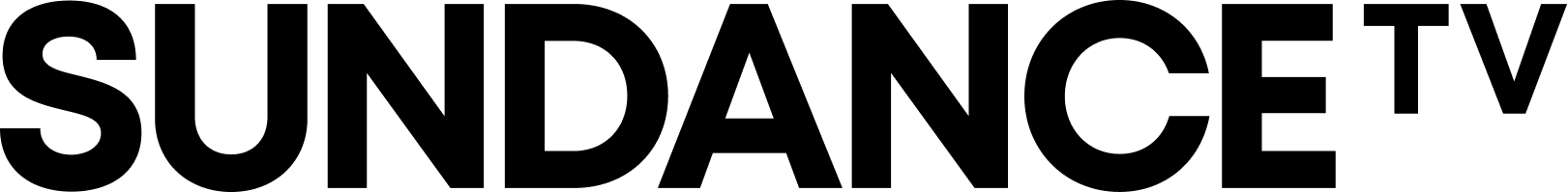
- Country: United States
- Headquarters: New York City

Programming
- Language: English
- Picture format: 1080i HDTV

Ownership
- Owner: AMC Global Media
- Sister channels: AMC; BBC America; IFC; We TV

History
- Launched: February 1, 1996; 30 years ago
- Former names: Sundance Channel (1996–2014)

Links
- Website: www.sundancetv.com

Availability

Streaming media
- Service(s): Philo, Sling TV, YouTube TV
- Amazon Video: www.amazon.com (requires subscription to access content)

Sundance TV (formerly known as Sundance Channel) is an American pay television channel owned by AMC Global Media that launched on February 1, 1996. The channel is named after Robert Redford's character in Butch Cassidy and the Sundance Kid and, while it is an extension of Redford's non-profit Sundance Institute, the channel operates independently of both the Institute and the Sundance Film Festival.

Originally, Sundance was dedicated largely to airing documentaries, independent feature films, short films, world cinema, and coverage on the latest developments from each year's Sundance Film Festival. The channel has since incorporated both original and acquired programming and became fully ad-supported in 2013, with programming being edited for content soon thereafter.

As of November 2023, Sundance is available to approximately 54,000,000 pay television households in the United States-down from its 2017 peak of 71,000,000 households.

== History ==
Sundance Channel logo 2008–2014

=== As Sundance Channel (1996–2014) ===
After negotiations to turn Robert Redford into a partner in AMC Networks predecessor Rainbow Media's Independent Film Channel broke down during 1994, Redford launched Sundance Channel in February 1996 as a joint venture between Showtime Networks (then a division of Viacom, later owned by CBS Corporation and subsequently by ViacomCBS), PolyGram (now NBCUniversal), and Redford (who also served as the creative director of the network).

The channel was initially launched on five cable systems in New York City; Los Angeles; Alexandria, Virginia; Chamblee, Georgia; and Pensacola, Florida. It originally operated mainly as a premium channel, commonly packaged with Showtime and its sister networks The Movie Channel and Flix.

On May 7, 2008, the Rainbow Media subsidiary of Cablevision, owners of rival network IFC, announced that it had purchased Sundance Channel for $496 million. The acquisition of Sundance Channel by Rainbow Media was completed in June 2008. On July 1, 2011, Rainbow Media was spun off from Cablevision into a separate company, which was renamed AMC Networks.

Since the sale, Sundance would expand into original programming. 2012 saw the premieres of two new unscripted series in the form of Get To Work and Push Girls, before the channel's second miniseries, Restless, premiered in December. Restless went on to receive two Emmy Award nominations. It was also announced that Sundance had picked up its first solely owned original series, and former developmental project from sister channel AMC, Rectify, and its third miniseries Top of the Lake. Much like AMC, the channel's original programming garnered critical acclaim.

On March 4, 2013, Sundance began airing AMC's Breaking Bad, to which the channel has exclusive syndication rights, on Monday nights. In October of that year, the channel became fully ad supported.

=== As Sundance TV (2014–present) ===
Sundance TV logo 2014-2022

On January 27, 2014, it was announced that the Sundance Channel would rebrand as Sundance TV on February 1, 2014. 2014 featured the channel's fourth miniseries The Honourable Woman, the channel's second solely owned original scripted series The Red Road, the new reality series Loredana, ESQ, and the second seasons of Rectify, The Writers' Room, and The Returned.

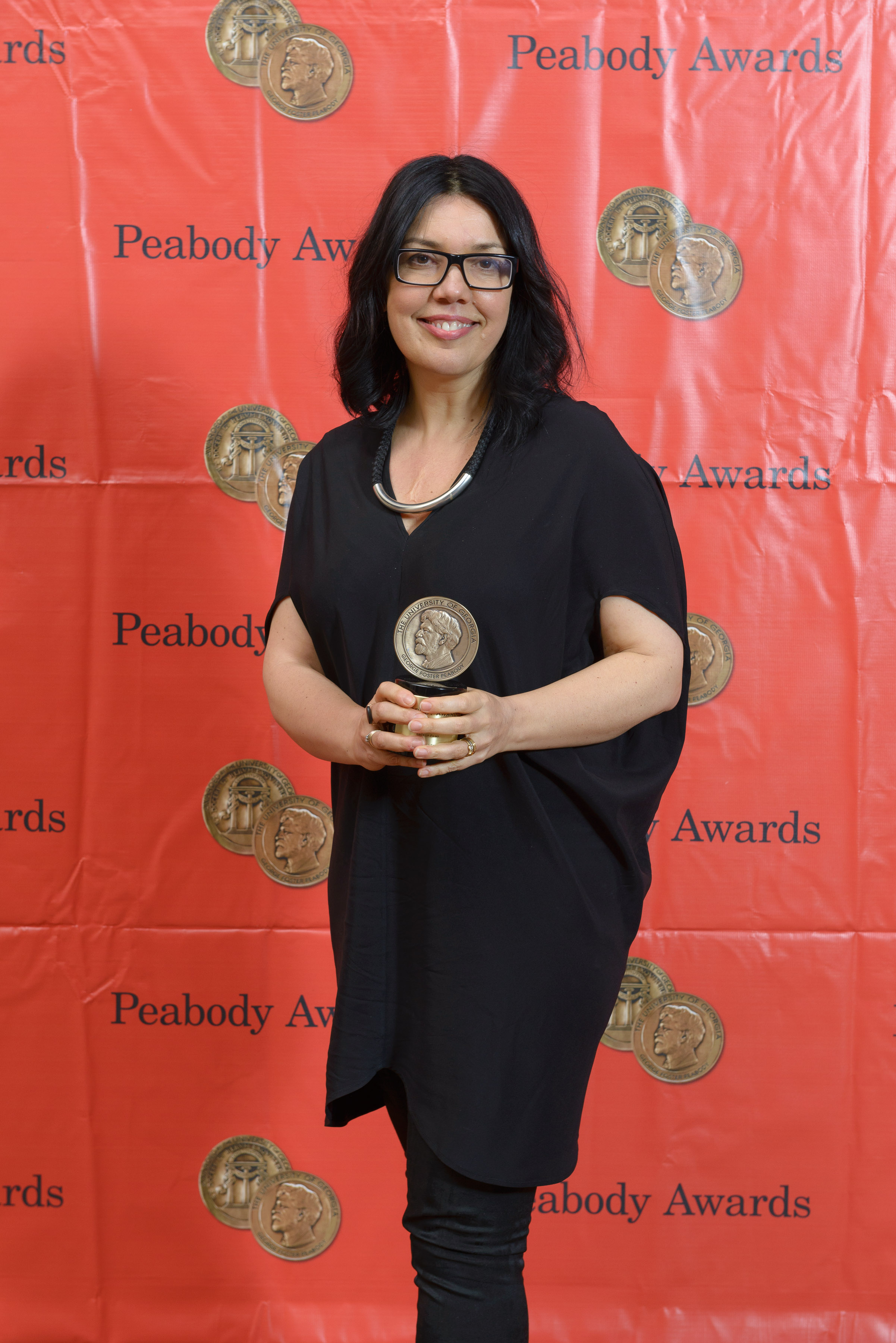
Sundance TV President Sarah Barnett at the 73rd Annual Peabody Awards with Peabody for The Returned (Les Revenants).

== International ==
Over time, Sundance Channel has expanded its international distribution in the Americas, Asia, Middle East and Europe.

=== Americas ===
- Latin America – Sundance Channel was launched in September 2013. It was renamed Sundance TV in January 2016. The channel was closed on April 30, 2020.
- Brazil – In the second half of 2014 a Brazilian version will be released of a channel fully dubbed in Portuguese. The channel was closed on April 30, 2020.
- Canada – On March 1, 2010, a Canadian version of Sundance Channel was launched by Toronto-based media company Corus Entertainment. AMC Networks did not own any stake in the Canadian service, but maintained a brand licensing agreement with Corus Entertainment to allow the use of the Sundance Channel brand as well as access to programming from the U.S. service. The channel was closed on March 1, 2018.

=== Asia ===
- Malaysia – Astro B.yond, ceased broadcasting on 1 July 2016
- Singapore – Singtel's Singtel TV, ceased broadcasting on 11 March 2017
- Southeast Asia, South Korea – Sundance Channel launched in 2013 on KT and Skylife

=== Middle East ===
- Arab World - beIN Channels Network, ceased transmission

=== Africa ===
- Africa – DStv (until 31 May 2020). The channel launched on DStv in Africa on 1 June 2017. On 20 May 2020, It was announced that the channel ceased transmission in Africa at 23:59 on 31 May 2020 along with SABC's retro rerun channel, SABC Encore.

=== Europe ===
- Belgium – Telenet (ended 30 September 2017)
- France (and Belgium, Switzerland) – Sundance Channel launched in France in September 2009 on Numericable, also available on Free, SFR, Orange and Canal+. It closed on 8 February 2020.
- Greece – Sundance Channel launched in Greece on 18 July 2011 as a linear channel on Cosmote TV and broadcasts in HD via satellite as Sundance Channel HD. It no longer broadcasts.
- Netherlands – Film1 Sundance launched in the Netherlands in March 2012, replacing the movie channel Film1 Festival. Film1 closed Film1 Sundance on 31 August 2017. Film1 wants to focus more on its video-on-demand services.
- Poland – Sundance Channel launched in Poland on 16 April 2010, on UPC Polska. The channel will rebrand as FilmMania on 1 December 2026.
- Portugal – NOS, ended on 31 March 2019 and replaced by Sundance TV on Demand.
- Romania – Sundance Channel was launched in March 2012 with subtitles and closed on 1 February 2019.
- Spain – Sundance Channel, launched on 1 June 2011 on Movistar TV. On 1 October 2014, it was launched on other TV providers, replacing Cinematk.
