= Ziggo Sport =

- Country: Netherlands
- Broadcast area: Netherlands
- Network: Ziggo
- Headquarters: Hilversum, Netherlands

Programming
- Language: Dutch
- Picture format: 4K UHD; 1080i HDTV (downscaled to 16:9 576i for the SDTV feed)

Ownership
- Owner: Liberty Global (50%); Vodafone (50%)
- Sister channels: Ziggo Sport 2 Ziggo Sport 3 Ziggo Sport 4 Ziggo Sport 5 Ziggo Sport 6

History
- Launched: 12 November 2015; 10 years ago

Availability

Streaming media
- Ziggo GO: ZiggoGO.tv (Europe only)

Ziggo Sport is a sports television channel in the Netherlands, operated by Ziggo and owned by VodafoneZiggo. It is only available for Ziggo subscribers and broadcasts a variety of sports with a focus on major sporting events, a weekly talk show called "Peptalk," and a weekly motorsport talkshow called "Ziggo Sport Race Café," (previously "Ziggo Sport F1 Café," from 2014 till 2021) and sports-related films and documentaries. It also has a paid counterpart, Ziggo Sport Totaal, which can also be received by non-Ziggo subscribers. The channel started with a repeating promotional film on 2 November 2015, and officially launched on 12 November 2015.

== History ==
In November 2014, Liberty Global took over Dutch cable company Ziggo, including the Sport1 premium sports channels. On 12 November 2015, the Sport1 premium sports channels were rebranded as Ziggo Sport Totaal. During this rebranding, Liberty Global also launched a new Ziggo Sport channel that is available for all digital TV subscribers of Ziggo.

Ziggo Sport is available in UHD as of March 2021.

In May 2021, Ziggo Sport officially lost the broadcast rights for Formula One for 2022 and beyond. During 2016 and 2021, the Dutch sports channel attracted a large audience by broadcasting Formula One due to the rise of their fellow countryman, Formula One driver Max Verstappen.
