= Film1 Premiere =

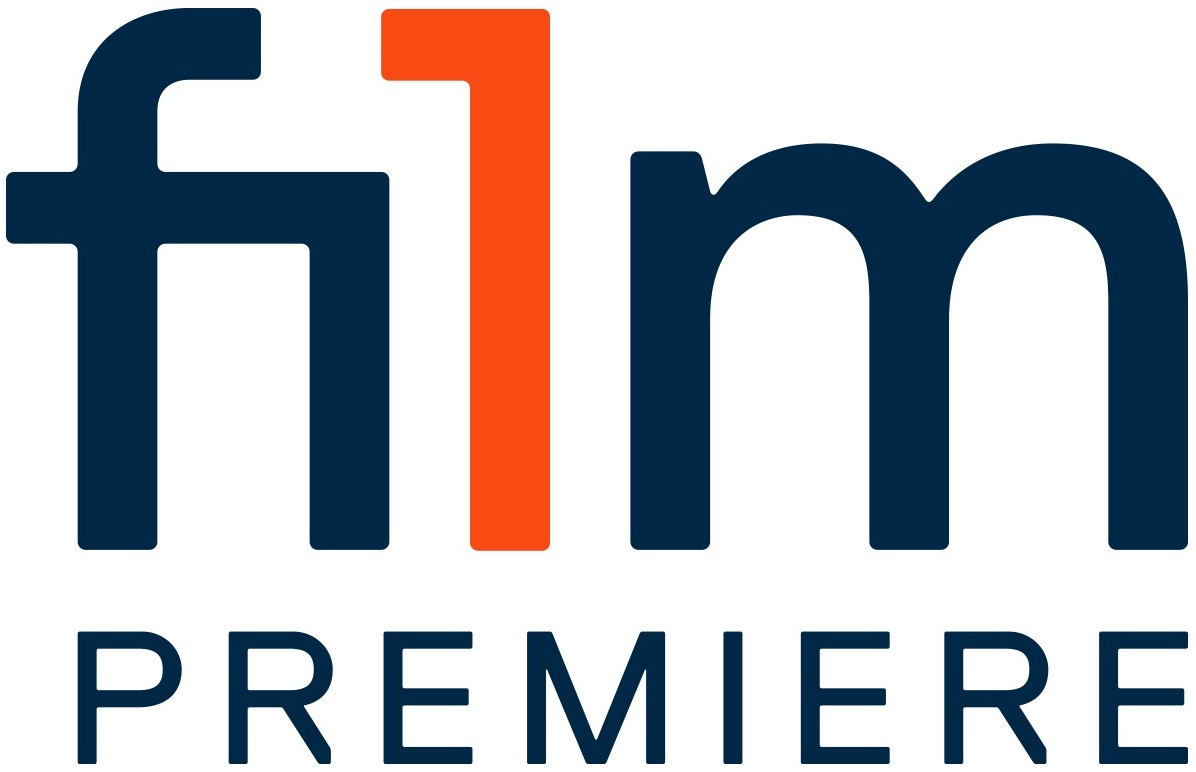
- Film1 Premiere Logo
- Country: Netherlands
- Broadcast area: Netherlands
- Network: Film1
- Headquarters: Amsterdam, Netherlands

Programming
- Language(s): Dutch/English
- Picture format: 1080i HDTV (downscaled to 16:9 576i for the SDTV feed)

Ownership
- Owner: SPI International (2019-); Sony Pictures Television (2015-2019); Liberty Global (2006-2015)
- Sister channels: Film1 Action; Film1 Family; Film1 Drama

History
- Launched: 1 February 2006; 19 years ago
- Former names: Film1.1 (2006-2011)

Links
- Website: film1.nl

Film1 Premiere (formerly known as Film1.1) is a Dutch premium television channel owned by SPI International. It is the flagship channel of the premium television service Film1. Film1 launched with its sister service Sport1 on 1 February 2006 and replaced the Canal+ Netherlands television channels. Film1 offers multiple channels with Dutch and international film and television series productions. Films are first shown on prime time on Film1 Premiere. On 25 February 2011, Film1.1 was rebranded as Film1 Premiere.

The channel is available from most digital cable and IPTV providers, and satellite provider CanalDigitaal. DVB-T provider Digitenne does not provide Film1.

== See also ==
- Digital television in the Netherlands
- Television in the Netherlands
