= FilmBox+ =

European TV channel

- Broadcast area: List: Bosnia and Herzegovina; Bulgaria; Croatia; Czech Republic; France; Hungary; Lithuania; Luxembourg; Montenegro; Myanmar; Netherlands; North Macedonia; Poland; Republic of Ireland; Romania; Russia; Serbia; Slovakia; Slovenia; Switzerland; Turkey; Ukraine; United States

Programming
- Language: English
- Picture format: 1080i HDTV (downscaled to 16:9 576i for the SDTV feed)

Ownership
- Owner: Kino Polska S.A. Canal+ Group
- Sister channels: 360TuneBox; DocuBox; FashionBox; Fast&FunBox; FightBox; FunBox; GameToon

History
- Launched: 28 October 2005; 21 years ago

Links
- Website: filmboxplus.stream

Availability

Streaming media
- Canal Digitaal Live: Watch Live

FilmBox+ (formerly FilmBox) is a European premium television and video on demand service owned by SPI International, a division of Canal+ Group. It owns several television channels and over-the-top media services.

== History ==
FilmBox launched in the Czech Republic and Slovakia on 28 October 2005. In 2007 SPI International expanded the FilmBox services to Poland, followed by Romania in 2008 and other Eastern European countries in 2009.

FilmBox expanded to Western Europe by launching in the Netherlands on 3 May 2021.

In the Republic of Ireland, the channel can be accessed on eir TV and on Vodafone TV, along with sister channels DocuBox, Fast&FunBox, GameToon, FashionBox and FightBox.

== Channels ==
- FilmBox+ one
- FilmBox+ Action
- FilmBox+ one Africa
- FilmBox+ Festival
- FilmBox+ Love&crime
- FilmBox+ Emotion
- FilmBox+ Hits
- FilmBox+ one Russia
- FilmBox+ Comedy
- GameToon
- DocuBox
- FashionBox
- FunBox
- 360 TuneBox
- Fast&FunBox
