= Dual board =

Corporate structure

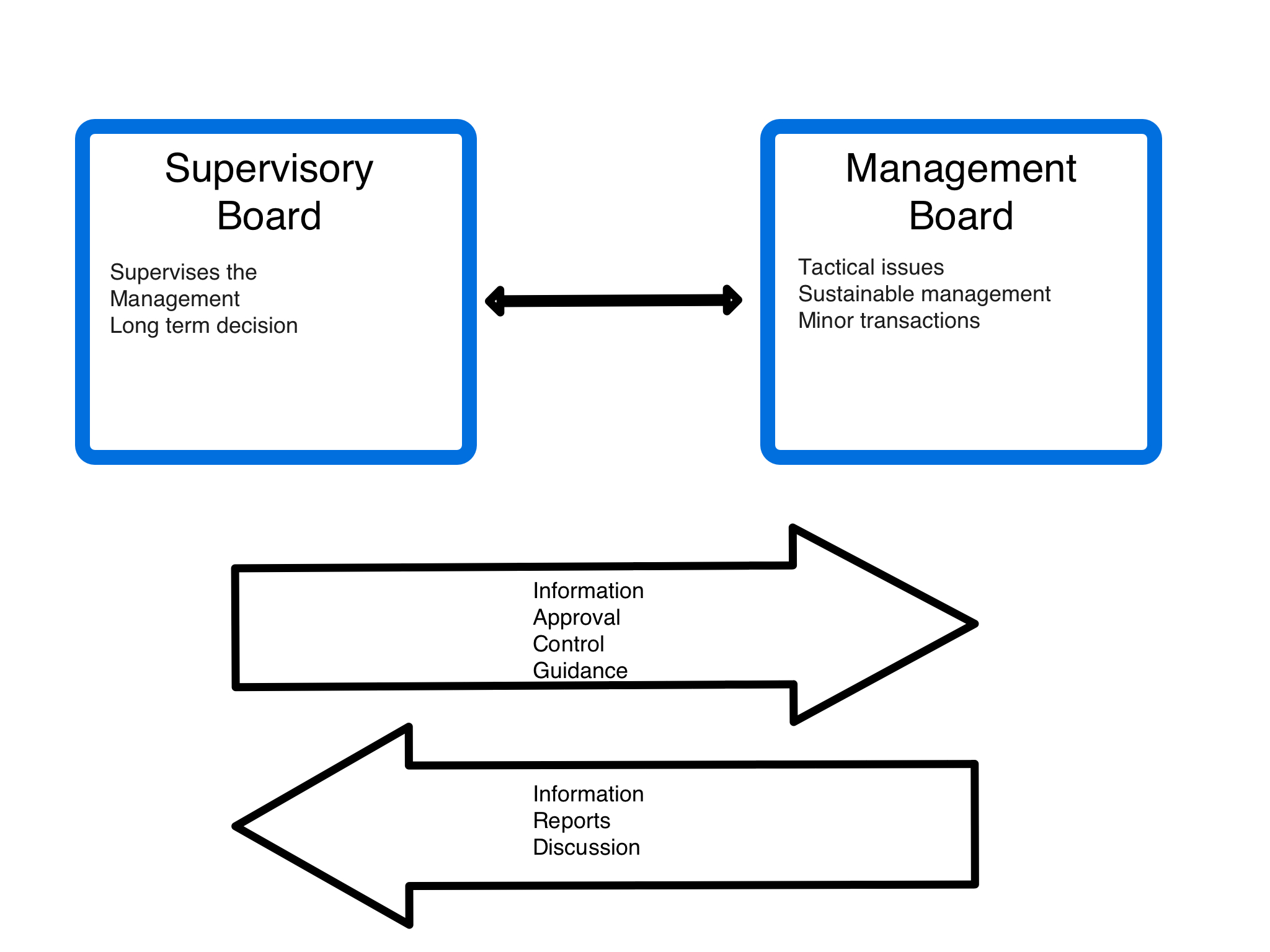
Visual representation of a Dual Board system

A Dual Board or Two Tier system is a corporate structure system that consists of two bodies i.e. the Council of Delegates to govern the Board of Directors and the Board of Directors to manage a corporation. The roles and relationships between the two bodies vary across countries. The structure is composed of two bodies, one focused on management and the other on governance.

In Germany, the Dual Board system is prescribed for corporations that are listed on the stock market (e.g., Lufthansa, and Adidas). It is argued that this approach better serves the objectives of a social market system.

Using a two tier system might also result in "more monitoring" and "less aggressive performance targets". It might also be "less efficient" from a financial market perspective. It has been suggested that financial efficiency may be impeded by reduced communication, and the higher costs of running a Dual Board.

== History ==
The two tier system was first adopted in German companies in the 19th century, and it became compulsory after the Second World War. Other countries that adopted a two tier approach include Finland, China, and the Netherlands. The Singapore Manufacturing Federation recently introduced a governance body as well. In the European Union, 10 countries require the two-tier approach, 8 countries require the single-tier approach, and 9 countries allow the use of either.

== Management Body ==
The Management Body meets frequently (often weekly) to deal with operational issues. Some contracting decisions and strategic planning decisions may have to be approved by the Governance Body. members of the Management Body are appointed by the members of the Governance Body (see below).

Composition of "Management Body"

Head of Board of Directors

- Chairperson cum Managing Director cum Chief Executive Officer shall be selected and appointed by the Council of Delegates
- Vice Chairperson cum Deputy Managing Director cum Co-Chief Executive Officer shall be selected and appointed by the Council of Delegates

Members of Board of Directors

- The number of Executive Director cum Chief [Specialisation] Officer shall be decided and appointed by the Council of Delegates

Note :- Specialisation implies finance, technology, marketing etc.

== Governance Body ==
The governance body is usually elected by the Shareholders. Composition varies across jurisdictions; its members are usually independent of the executive but it can include employee representatives in some countries. Generally, the governance body guides and monitors the management body.

Composition of "Governance Body"

Head of Council of Delegates

- Active Delegate shall be elected by the equity shareholders
- Co-Active Delegate shall be elected by the equity shareholders

Members of Council of Delegates

- Executive Delegates shall be elected by the equity shareholders
- Non Executive Delegates shall be elected by equity shareholders and nominated by the national government, provincial government, officers union of that corporate establishment and employees union of that corporate establishment

Types of Delegates

- Residential Delegate
- Whole time Delegate
- Independent Delegate
- Alternate Delegate
- Women Delegate
- Additional Delegate
- Nominee Delegate
- Small Shareholder Delegate
- Shadow Delegate
- Casual Vaccancy Delegate
- Any other type of "Delegate" to be included

The governance body is involved in long term strategic planning. Another task that the Governance Body is in charge of is the selection, dismissal, and designation of the members in the Management Body, to "ensure a long term succession planning".

== Cooperation Between bodies ==
The Management Body has to closely cooperate with the Governance Body to develop the business strategy, this is done by creating a steady flow of information between the two. The information flow would include risk management, business development and any differences of the development of the business compared to the initial plan. Open discussions between members of the boards are also key to the functionality of the business under a Two Tier System, because these must exchange information frequently.

== Country systems ==
Countries with two-tier boards include:

- Germany
- Netherlands
- Austria
- Poland
- Indonesia
- China

Countries where the option of a two-tier board is provided by law include:

- Belgium
- Italy
- France
- Romania

== See also ==
- European Company Statute
- Supervisory Board
- Executive Director
