= TV Vlaanderen =

Flanders television provider

- Company type: Subsidiary
- Industry: Pay TV
- Founded: 2006
- Headquarters: Zaventem, Belgium
- Key people: K. Pauwels, General Director
- Products: DVB-S2, DVB-T2
- Owner: M7 Group
- Parent: Canal+
- Website: tv-vlaanderen.be

TV Vlaanderen Digitaal previous and first logo from 2006 to 2017

TV Vlaanderen is a digital satellite television and terrestrial television service provider for the Flanders region and community in Belgium.

TV Vlaanderen's customers are mostly people living in Flanders. However, as TV Vlaanderen is officially available to the whole of Belgium, TV Vlaanderen also has many Flemish customers living in the French-speaking part of Belgium due to the unavailability of Dutch-language TV channels on cable television platforms in Wallonia.

Like the Dutch satellite television provider CanalDigitaal, TV Vlaanderen is owned by M7 Group (Canal+ Luxembourg S.a.r.l). M7 Group since September 2019 is part of French-based Groupe Canal+, which was a subsidiary of Vivendi until its spin-off in December 2024.

== History ==
Originally, TV Vlaanderen only offered a DVB-S2 satellite television service, using the SES Astra satellites at Astra 19.2°E and at Astra 23.5°E.

In 2017, it started a DVB-T2 terrestrial service branded "Antenne TV", which uses the Norkring transmitter network. Antenne TV was shut down on 1 September 2024.

== Smart card ==
The Flemish public and commercial broadcasts are not freely available via satellite. To receive the Flemish broadcasts, a Smartcard is required to decipher the Mediaguard signal.

A standard DVB-S2 receiver is used, which can also receive free-to-air broadcasts.
