= Télésat =

Belgian satellite television company

- Industry: Telecommunications
- Founded: 19 January 2009
- Founder: Kurt Pauwels
- Area served: Belgium
- Key people: Hans Troelstra (CEO)
- Products: Satellite television
- Parent: M7 Group (Canal+ Group)
- Website: www.telesat.be

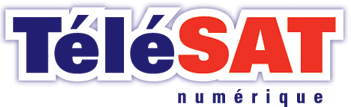
Original logo used at launch

Télésat, formerly known as Télésat Numérique, is a satellite subscription television provider owned by M7 Group aimed at the French-speaking community of Belgium, which also offers a triple play package of satellite television, internet and landline telephone services. In september 2019, M7 Group was bought by Vivendi's Canal+ Group. In 2020 the legal entity M7 Group S.A. changed its name into Canal+ Luxembourg S.a.r.l. while its group brand name remains M7 Group.

In 2010 the operator added the possibility to add a selection of Flemish stations to a client's subscription by adding the option "Espace TV Vlaanderen" at an additional monthly cost but which requires a triple LNB or motorised satellite dish.
