= FightBox (TV channel) =

Television channel dedicated to combat sports

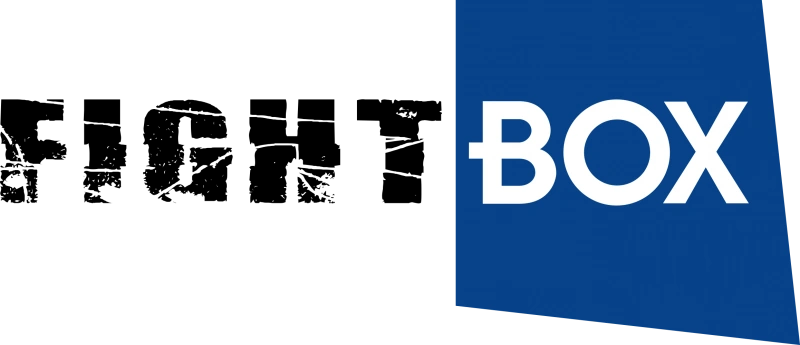
- Broadcast area: Worldwide

Programming
- Language: English

Ownership
- Owner: Mediabox Broadcasting International, Ltd (SPI International)
- Sister channels: FilmBox; FashionBox; DocuBox; Funbox; 360 TuneBox; Fast & FunBox; Gametoon

History
- Launched: June 1, 2012

Links
- Website: www.fightbox.com

Availability

Streaming media
- Canaldigitaal Live App: Watch Live
- Filmbox Online: Watch Live

FightBox is an international English TV channel owned by Mediabox Broadcasting International, a division of SPI International. The network broadcasts programming related to combat sports, including mixed martial arts, boxing, kickboxing, and professional wrestling.

== History ==
The channel was started June 1, 2012.

== Programming ==
=== Bare Knuckle ===
- Valor BK - American promotion.

=== Boxing ===
- Dream Boxing
- LNK Boxing - Baltic promotion.

=== Kickboxing ===
- Colosseum Tournament - Romanian promotion.
- Enfusion - Dutch promotion.
- GFC - Romanian promotion.
- KOK - Baltic promotion.
- Kunlun Fight - Chinese promotion.
- Makowski Fighting Championship - Polish promotion.
- Mix Fight Championship - German promotion.
- Mix Fight Gala - German promotion.
- OSS Fighters - Romanian promotion.
- Prometheus Fighting Promotion - Romanian promotion.
- Superfight Serie Hungary - Hungarian promotion.
- TatNeft Cup - Russian promotion.

=== MMA ===
- Cage Fury - American promotion.
- Bushido MMA - Baltic promotion.
- RXF - Romanian promotion.
- Thunderstrike Fight League - Polish promotion.

=== Professional wrestling ===
- NEW - German promotion.
