= Film1 =

Dutch premium television and video on demand service

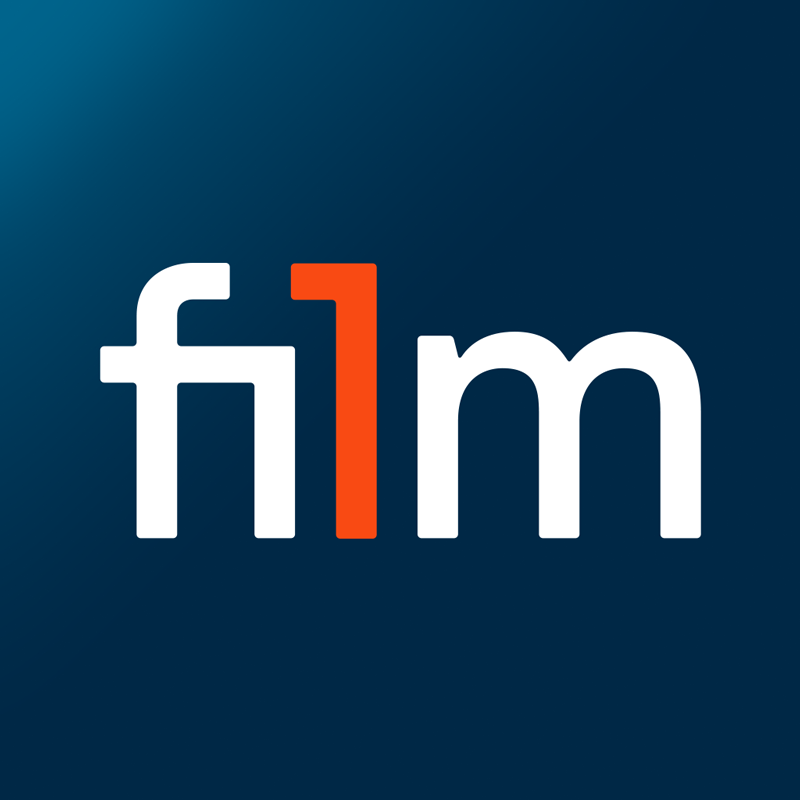
- Logo used since 2016
- Country: Netherlands
- Broadcast area: Netherlands
- Network: Premium filmservice; Video on demand; Streaming media
- Headquarters: Amsterdam, Netherlands

Programming
- Language: Dutch/English
- Picture format: 1080i HDTV (downscaled to 16:9 576i for the SDTV feed)

Ownership
- Parent: SPI International (2019–present); Sony Pictures Television (2015–2019); Liberty Global (2006–2015)

History
- Launched: 1 February 2006; 20 years ago
- Replaced: Filmnet (1984–1997); Canal+ Netherlands (1997–2006)

Links
- Website: film1.nl

Availability

Streaming media
- Film1: Film1.nl
- PlayStation: PSN Store
- Amazon Channels: Amazon Channels

Film1 is a Dutch Pay-tv and video on demand service that replaced Canal+ and is owned by SPI International (previously owned by Liberty Global and Sony Pictures Television).

== Background ==
The service launched with three channels and a high-definition and timeshift version of the main channel. On 1 October 2008 Film1 Action was added to the line up. Film1 Series started on 17 January 2012 when it replaced the 1 hour timeshift channel Film1 Premiere +1. On 20 September 2012 Film1 announced that they would be launching an online GO service with Tvinci.

On 31 January 2012, Film1 announced that it would launch Sundance Channel in the Netherlands, by replacing the Film1 Festival on 1 March of the same year. Film1 closed Film1 Sundance on 31 August 2017. The premium television service wants to focus more on its video-on-demand services.

The channels are available on digital cable of most Dutch cable companies (e.g. Ziggo, Delta NV and Caiway), satellite (CanalDigitaal) and IPTV (e.g. KPN, T-Mobile Netherlands and Tele2 Netherlands). Most providers support the Film1 on demand service via a settopbox, the Film1 mobile app or the Film1 website. Film1 is not available via DVB-T.

On 5 November 2020 Amazon Channels started in the Netherlands and it provides Film1 as an additional package.

== Ownership ==
Chellomedia (Liberty Global) launched Film1 together with its sister service Sport1 (known as Ziggo Sport Totaal after 11 November 2015) on 1 February 2006 and replaced the Canal+ premium television channels in the Netherlands. The service offers multiple film channels with Dutch and international productions many of which are television premières. It also broadcast television series, documentaries and concerts.

On 26 July 2014, Liberty Global announced that it had put Film1 up for sale. Liberty Global agreed to sell Film1 to Sony Pictures Television on 27 March 2015, and the acquisition of Film1 and associated channels was completed on 21 July of the same year.

On 1 May 2019, Sony Pictures Entertainment announced that Film1 would close on 1 August 2019. On 17 June it was announced that Film1 will make a restart. SPI International has acquired Film1.

== Channels ==
- Film1 Premiere: Main flagship channel.
- Film1 Action: Second channel focuses on thriller, action, and horror films.
- Film1 Family: Third channel which focuses on comedy, family and children films.
- Film1 Drama: Fourth channel.
- Film1 on Demand: A video on demand-service that provides selected content from all the above channels on an on-demand basis. The service is available from Ziggo's VOD service.

== See also ==
- Television in the Netherlands
- Digital television in the Netherlands
