= Sundance Channel (Canada) =

Defunct Canadian TV channel

- Sundance Channel logo
- Country: Canada
- Broadcast area: Nationwide
- Headquarters: Toronto, Ontario

Programming
- Picture format: 1080i (HDTV) (2013–2018); 480i (SDTV) (2001–2018)

Ownership
- Owner: CHUM Limited (2001–2006); CTVglobemedia (2006–2010); Corus Entertainment (2010–2018) (branding licensed from AMC Networks from 2010 to 2018)
- Sister channels: MovieTime; IFC; Showcase; Action; DejaView; CMT; ABC Spark; W Network; CosmoTV; BBC Canada

History
- Launched: September 7, 2001; 24 years ago
- Closed: March 1, 2018; 8 years ago (16 years, 5 months and 22 days)
- Former names: Drive-In Classics (2001–2010)

Sundance Channel was a Canadian English language Category B specialty channel owned by Corus Entertainment that aired various films.

The channel was founded in 2001 as Drive-In Classics by CHUM Limited, the owner of Citytv, that aired Drive-In B films and other programming related to it. Drive-In Classics was acquired by CTVglobemedia in 2007 and was resold to Corus Entertainment in 2009.

In March 2010, Drive-In Classics became Sundance Channel which aired programming focused on independent films, documentaries, music series, dramas and more. The channel closed its doors on March 27, 2018.

== History ==
=== As Drive-In Classics ===
In June 2001, CHUM Limited was given approval from the Canadian Radio-television and Telecommunications Commission (CRTC) to launch a national category 2 specialty channel known as "The Drive-In Channel", with programming described as being centred on "Drive-In B movies and series, as well as occasional magazine-style shows focusing on the genre".

Drive-In Classics logo (2001-2010)

The channel was launched only three months later, on September 7, 2001 at 9:00 p.m. EST under the name "Drive-In Classics", which focused on showing primarily films from the B movie genre, focusing on films popular at the drive-in theatres in the 1950s to 1970s, and a number of television series including The Hilarious House of Frightenstein and Xena: Warrior Princess.

Programming on Drive-In Classics were organized into themes including: Martial Arts Mondays - fight-themed movies, Western Wednesdays - Western movies, Steamy Windshields (Fridays) - teenage-themed movies, Horror Marathon (Saturdays) - horror films and Salem's Lot, various films picked by host Rob Salem, which was ended on August 30, 2009.

In July 2006, Bell Globemedia announced that it would purchase CHUM for an estimated $1.7 billion CAD, included in the sale was Drive-In Classics. The sale was approved by the CRTC in June 2007, with the transaction completed on June 22, 2007 while the Citytv stations were sold to Rogers Media.

On July 14, 2009, CTVglobemedia announced the sale of Drive-In Classics and SexTV: The Channel to Corus Entertainment for $40 million CAD. Before the sale was approved, Corus announced in late September that they planned to rebrand the channel, but did not give any specific details regarding the rebranding. The sale was approved by the CRTC on November 19.

=== As Sundance Channel ===
On December 8, 2009, Corus announced that Drive-In Classics would be rebranded as a Canadian version of Sundance Channel (now known as SundanceTV) on March 1, 2010 under an agreement with the American channel's owner, AMC Networks (formerly known as Rainbow Media Holdings, LLC, a subsidiary of Cablevision), which would not own any stake in the Canadian channel. The channel was rebranded on March 1, 2010 as planned, focusing its programming on independent films, documentaries, scripted drams and comedies, and musical performances.

In February 2018, a notice was posted on Sundance Channel's website that the channel was closed on March 1, 2018. Shortly after this, the channel space that was created by Drive-In Classics in 2001 simply ceased to exist. The CRTC revoked the channel's broadcast license on March 27, 2018.

== Programming ==
Includes former programming as of December 2014.

Acquired from SundanceTV

- Girls Who Like Boys Who Like Boys
- Iconoclasts
- Love Lust
- The Red Road
- Push Girls

Other Acquired Programming

- The Hour
- Innovators in Music
- Land Girls
- London Live
- Monty Python's Flying Circus
- Rake
- Shameless
- Video Killed the Radio Star

== Sundance Channel HD ==
Telus has announced on their website that they will carry the HD feed of Sundance Channel (Canada). Shaw Direct and Bell Satellite TV never launched it in time due to the channel's closure.

== See also ==
- Sundance TV
