= IFC (Canadian TV channel) =

Canadian TV channel (2001–2019)

- IFC logo
- Country: Canada
- Broadcast area: Nationwide
- Headquarters: Toronto, Ontario

Programming
- Picture format: 1080i (HDTV) (2016–2019); 480i (SDTV)

Ownership
- Owner: Corus Entertainment (branding licensed from AMC Networks) (Showcase Television Inc.)
- Sister channels: MovieTime; Showcase; Adult Swim

History
- Launched: August 15, 2001; 25 years ago
- Closed: September 30, 2019; 6 years ago
- Replaced by: Crave (streaming); Much (linear)

IFC was a Canadian English language specialty channel. The channel was owned by Showcase Television, Inc., a subsidairy of Corus Entertainment known to broadcast independent films, documentaries, and television series.

The channel was launched on August 15, 2001 by Salter Street Films with the name licensed from the American company Rainbow Media (now known as AMC Networks), the owner of IFC, but the company was acquired by Alliance Atlantis later that year. After various ownership changes, the channel ceased operations on September 30, 2019.

== History ==
In November 2000, a joint venture between Salter Street Films (95%) and Triptych Media Inc. (5%) were awarded a broadcasting licence by the Canadian Radio-television and Telecommunications Commission (CRTC) for a channel called The Independent Film Channel Canada, intended to emulate the American IFC service, the channel was described as "a national English-language Category 1 specialty television service consisting of dramatic and non-fiction short and feature-length independent films, and programs focusing on the independent film-making process, film makers and film festivals."

On February 9, 2001, the CRTC approved a proposed corporate restructuring that would allow Salter Street Films acquire Triptych Media's 5% in the service. Three days later, on February 12, Alliance Atlantis announced that it would be purchasing Salter Street Films, acquiring the licence for the Independent Film Channel Canada in the process.

The channel was launched on August 15, 2001 as Independent Film Channel or IFC, under the sole ownership of Salter Street Films, with its name licensed from its American counterpart, IFC. In December 2001, the CRTC approved the purchase Salter Street Films by Alliance Atlantis.

On January 18, 2008, a joint venture between Canwest and Goldman Sachs Alternatives known as CW Media, acquired control of IFC through its purchase of Alliance Atlantis' broadcasting assets, which were placed in a trust in August 2007. On October 27, 2010, ownership changed again as Shaw Communications gained control of IFC as a result of its acquisition of Canwest and Goldman Sachs' interest in CW Media.

On April 1, 2016, IFC's parent company Shaw Media was sold to Corus Entertainment.

In July 2019, various cable operators reported that the channel would be shut down alongside CosmoTV on September 30, 2019. Its license was returned to the CRTC on November 4, 2019.

In 2022, Bell Canada, the owner of its media division, entered an agreement with AMC Networks to carry IFC Films Unlimited on its Fibe TV service. Most of the programs that were aired on IFC Canada now airs on Crave and Much.

== Programming ==
Like its U.S. namesake, the channel originally focused almost exclusively on smaller independent films. However, it eventually broadened its programming to include more mainstream films as many independent studios became divisions of major film companies. It also de-emphasized the use of the full Independent Film Channel name in favor of the IFC acronym, possibly due to the decreasing number of independent films in its programming lineup. The channel still utilized the 2001 IFC logo rather than the current-day American version, which was still used by IFC Films at the time of the network's closure.

IFC also began to regularly air TV series. These were mostly second-run programs that previously aired on other Canadian channels, such as sister channel Showcase. None of the American version's original programming aired on this channel; they had instead been picked up by competing Canadian channels. For example, Portlandia premiered on Super Channel and aired in syndication on BiteTV (Now Makeful). For a number of years, it mainly carried content from the American cable network Showtime under a licensing agreement with that network's owner, the CBS Corporation.

As of December 2013, Bell Media, the rival broadcaster of IFC Canada's parent company Corus Entertainment, had an exclusive deal for the American channel's original programming; including The Spoils of Babylon (which premiered on The Movie Network) and Comedy Bang! Bang! (which currently airs on MuchMusic), as well as past shows.
