= NetHold =

NetHold is a Pay TV company based in the Netherlands. As of 1997, the company merged with CANAL+ and is directed by Johann Rupert, chairman of Richemont.

== Foundation ==
In 1985, Koos Bekker led the founding committee behind M-Net, a Television platform operator in South Africa.

In 1990, M-net was introduced to Johannesburg Stock market. In 1991, the company changed its name to MIH Ltd and was incorporated in the British Virgin Islands.

In 1995, MIH and Richemont joined their assets to form NetHold. Koos Bekker was appointed NetHold’s first general director.

By march 1996, the company amassed $950 million revenue.

== Partnerships ==
NetHold owns 45% of Telepiu and 6.5% of Mediaset in Italy.

The company was on the verge of signing a deal with DirecTV but the partnership was dismissed.

== Merging with CANAL+ ==
In 1997, NetHold merged with CANAL+ a French-based Pay TV operator. By that time, NetHold’s value reached $1.8 billion.

Richemont and MIH kept NetHold’s pay-television businesses in Africa, Greece, Cyprus and the Middle east then sold them to CANAL+ in exchange for 20% shares in all of its operations.

The union of NetHold and CANAL+ garnered 8.5 million subscribers. The group is present in France, Spain, Italy and Germany with a large audience in Scandinavian countries. The Board of directors of the merging venture includes representatives of CANAL+’s major shareholder Havas, Compagnie des eaux and NetHold’s shareholders Richemont and MIH.

== Directors ==
- Koos Bekker (former NetHold CEO, former General director of Naspers)
- Johann Rupert (Richemont chairman and NetHold CEO)
