= Film1 Family =

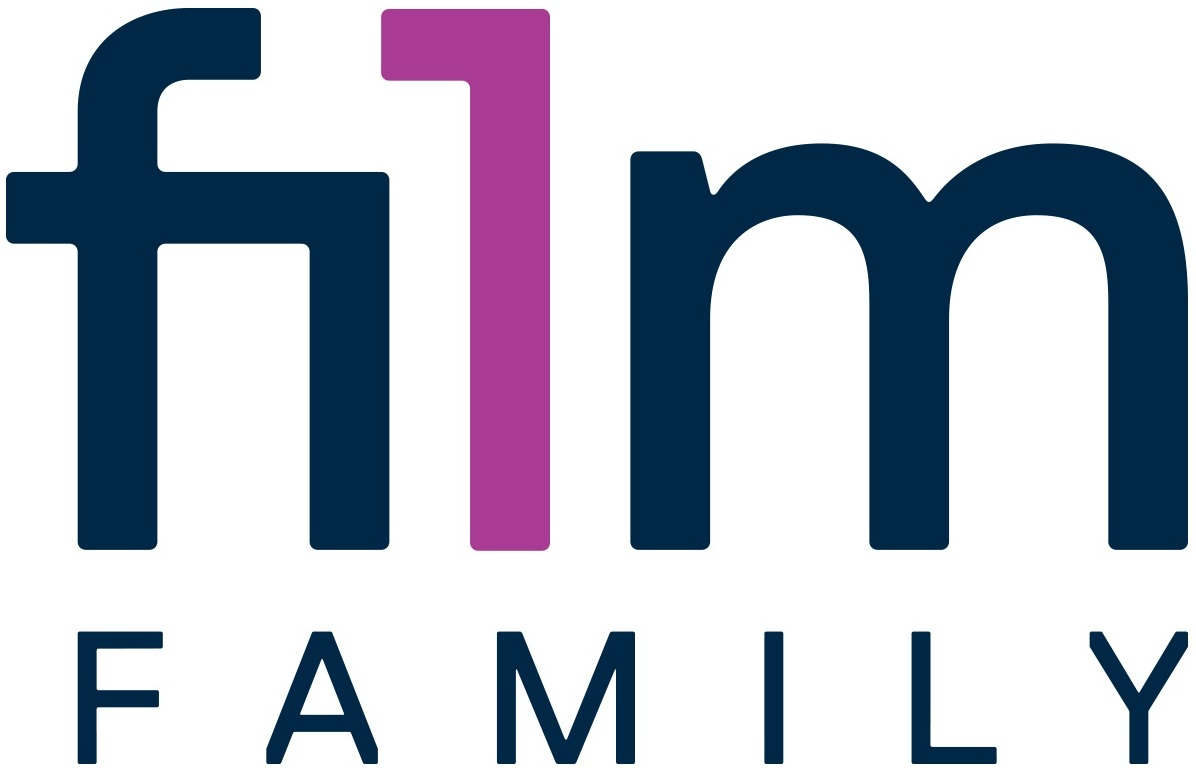
- Film1 Family Logo
- Country: Netherlands
- Broadcast area: Netherlands
- Network: Film1
- Headquarters: Amsterdam, Netherlands

Programming
- Language: Dutch/English
- Picture format: 1080i HDTV (downscaled to 16:9 576i for the SDTV feed)

Ownership
- Owner: SPI International (2019-); Sony Pictures Television (2015-2019); Liberty Global (2006-2015)
- Sister channels: Film1 Premiere; Film1 Action; Film1 Drama

History
- Launched: 1 February 2006; 19 years ago
- Former names: Film1.2 (2006-2011); Film1 Comedy & Kids (2013-2016)

Links
- Website: film1.nl

Film1 Family (formerly known as Film1.2 and Film1 Comedy & Kids) is a Dutch premium television channel owned by SPI International. Its main focus is on comedy and children films. Film1 launched together with its sister service Sport1 on 1 February 2006 and replaced the Canal+ Netherlands television channels. Film1 offers multiple channels with Dutch and international film and television series productions. Film1.2 rebranded into Film1 Family on 25 February 2011. Film1 Family changed into Film1 Comedy & Kids on 6 September 2013 but on 1 September 2016 it changed back to Film1 Family.

Film1 Comedy & Kids' old logo as Film1 Family

The channel is available on most digital cable and IPTV providers, and satellite provider CanalDigitaal. DVB-T provider Digitenne does not provide Film1.

== See also ==
- Film1
- Television in the Netherlands
- Digital television in the Netherlands
