= Film1 Drama =

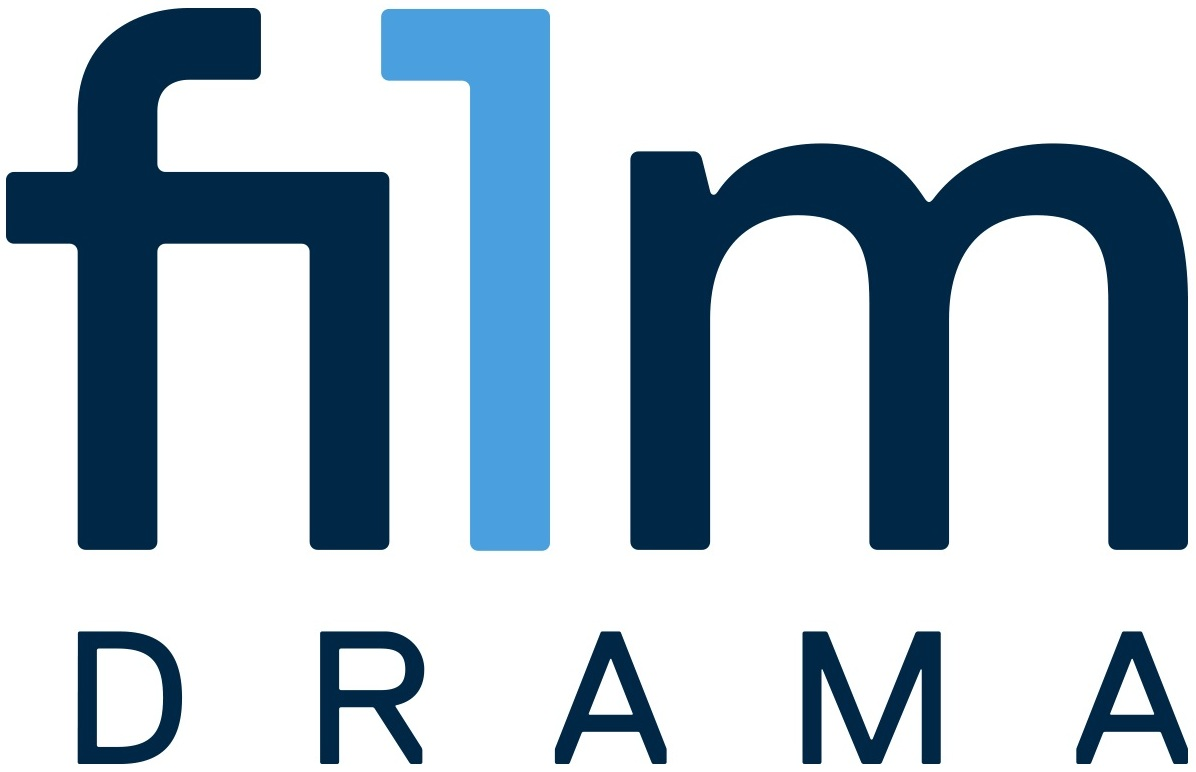
- Film1 Drama Logo
- Country: Netherlands
- Broadcast area: Netherlands
- Network: Film1
- Headquarters: Amsterdam, Netherlands

Programming
- Language(s): Dutch/English
- Picture format: 1080i HDTV (downscaled to 16:9 576i for the SDTV feed)

Ownership
- Owner: SPI International (2019-); Sony Pictures Television (2015-2019); Liberty Global (2012-2015)
- Sister channels: Film1 Premiere; Film1 Action; Film1 Family

History
- Launched: 17 January 2012; 13 years ago
- Replaced: Film1 Premiere +1
- Former names: Film1 Series (2012-2013); Film1 Spotlight (2013-2016)

Links
- Website: film1.nl

Film1 Drama is a Dutch premium television channel owned by SPI International. Every night the programming is dedicated to a theme, such as a director or a genre. Film1 launched together with its sister service Sport1 on 1 February 2006 and replaced the Canal+ Netherlands television channels. Film1 offers multiple channels with Dutch and international film and television series productions. Initially Film1 Drama started as Film1 Series on 17 January 2012 when it replaced the 1 hour timeshift channel Film1 Premiere +1, focusing on television series. It changed into Film1 Spotlight on 6 September 2013. On 1 September 2016 Film1 Spotlight got renamed by Film1 Drama.

Film1 Spotlight's old logo as Film1 Series

The channel is available on most digital cable and IPTV providers, and Satellite provider CanalDigitaal. DVB-T provider Digitenne doesn't provide Film1 Drama.

== See also ==
- Film1
- Television in the Netherlands
- Digital television in the Netherlands
