= Film1 Action =

- Country: Netherlands
- Broadcast area: Netherlands
- Network: Film1
- Headquarters: Amsterdam, Netherlands

Programming
- Language(s): Dutch/English
- Picture format: 1080i HDTV (downscaled to 16:9 576i for the SDTV feed)

Ownership
- Owner: SPI International (2019-); Sony Pictures Television (2015-2019); Liberty Global (2008-2015)
- Sister channels: Film1 Premiere; Film1 Family; Film1 Drama

History
- Launched: 1 October 2008; 16 years ago

Links
- Website: film1.nl

Film1 Action is a Dutch premium television channel owned by SPI International. Its main focus is on thriller, action and horror films. Film1 launched together with its sister service Sport1 on 1 February 2006 and replaced the Canal+ Netherlands television channels. Film1 offers multiple channels with Dutch and international film and television series productions. On 1 October 2008 Film1 launched Film1 Action.

The channel is available on most digital cable and IPTV providers, and satellite provider CanalDigitaal. DVB-T provider Digitenne does not provide Film1.

== See also ==
- Film1
- Television in the Netherlands
- Digital television in the Netherlands
