= Canal+ CZ/SK =

Czech satellite service

Canal+
- Type: Subsidiary
- Industry: Telecommunication
- Founded: 2007
- Products: Television, direct broadcast satellite, IPTV
- Parent: Canal+ Luxembourg S. à r.l.

Canal+ (formerly Skylink) is a satellite and IPTV provider that offers Czech and Slovak television and radios channels in the Czech Republic and Slovakia. Its offering includes free-to-air (FTA) and pay-TV channels.

A number of HDTV channels were introduced into the package in 2009, and Skylink reported having 500,000 subscribers from Slovakia and the Czech Republic, but by the end of 2009, Skylink had 900,000 subscribers. By April 2010, Skylink had reached one million subscribers. Skylink became part of Canal+ Luxembourg S. à r.l. in September 2019.

The Canal+ service is broadcast via Astra 3B and Astra 3C at 23.5° east.

On 22 October 2026, Skylink was rebranded as Canal+.
