= Canal Digitaal =

Dutch satellite television provider

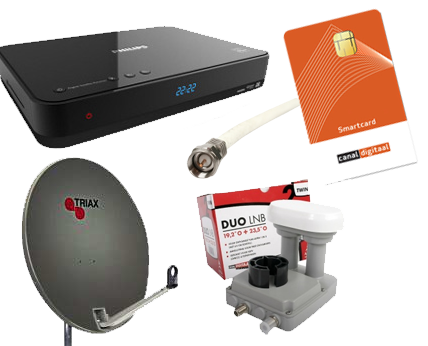
- Company type: Subsidiary
- Industry: Subscription Television
- Predecessor: MultiChoice Nederland
- Founded: 1 July 1996 (as MultiChoice Nederland); 1 October 2009 (as CanalDigitaal)
- Headquarters: Hilversum, Netherlands
- Area served: Netherlands
- Products: Direct broadcast satellite
- Parent: M7 Group
- Website: www.canaldigitaal.nl

CanalDigitaal previous logo

CanalDigitaal is a provider of digital television via satellite for the Dutch market, using the Astra satellites at 23.5° east.

Initially customers were mainly Dutch citizens in the countryside who did not have cable access. But in the meantime the company also managed to expand into the cities. This is sometimes complicated in the Netherlands due to local building codes restricting the placement of satellite dishes. The company now also actively markets its products to countries outside the Netherlands and it is no longer necessary to have a Dutch address or bank account to take out a subscription.

CanalDigitaal is owned by the Luxembourg M7 Group (Canal+ Luxembourg s.a.r.l.), also owner of the Belgian TV Vlaanderen Digitaal and TéléSAT Numérique, the Austrian HD Austria, the Czech/Slovak Skylink. Since September 2019, M7 Group is owned by Vivendi's Groupe Canal+.

== Smartcard ==
Unlike many German and British broadcasters, the Dutch public and commercial broadcasts are not freely available via satellite. To receive the Dutch broadcasts a smartcard is required to decrypt the Mediaguard signal. CanalDigitaal has recently switched from Mediaguard 2 to Mediaguard 3.

A standard DVB-S or DVB-S2 receiver is used, which can also receive other free-to-air broadcasts.

In 2017, Canal Digitaal went hybrid with a combined satellite and IPTV offer. The company is now working with several IPTV partners, including M7's online.nl service.

== Fastscan channel list ==
The CanalDigitaal Fastscan lists all channels carried on the CanalDigitaal platform and almost all free-to-air channels on the 19.2° east, 23.5° east and 28.2° east satellites. Many channels are free, others are available only with a subscription.

== See also ==
- Television in the Netherlands
- Digital television in the Netherlands
