= Ziggo Sport Totaal =

Dutch television service

- Country: Netherlands
- Broadcast area: Netherlands
- Network: Ziggo
- Headquarters: Hilversum, Netherlands

Programming
- Language: Dutch
- Picture format: 1080i HDTV (downscaled to 16:9 576i for the SDTV feed)

Ownership
- Owner: Liberty Global (50%); Vodafone (50%)
- Sister channels: Ziggo Sport

History
- Launched: 1 February 2006; 20 years ago
- Replaced: SuperSport (1995–1997); Canal+ Netherlands (1997–2006)
- Former names: Sport1 (2006–2015)

Links
- Website: ziggosporttotaal.nl

Availability

Streaming media
- Ziggo Sport Totaal Go: Watch live (Netherlands only)
- Ziggo GO: ZiggoGO.tv (Europe only)

Ziggo Sport Totaal is a Dutch premium television service operated by Ziggo and owned by VodafoneZiggo, a joint venture between Liberty Global and Vodafone. Ziggo Sport Totaal launched as Sport1 with its sister service Film1 on 1 February 2006 and replaced the Canal+ Netherlands channels. Film1 was sold to Sony Pictures Television on 21 July 2015, while Sport1 remained Liberty Global-owned. At launch, the service consisted of two main channels (Ziggo Sport & Ziggo Sport 2), six extra channels (Ziggo Sport Select, Ziggo Sport Football, Ziggo Sport Golf, Ziggo Sport Racing, Ziggo Sport Documentary, & Ziggo Sport Tennis) and one HD simulcast of the first main channel. On 2 February 2009, the number of extra channels was reduced to four. The extra channels only broadcast when necessary to live broadcast multiple sport events at the same time. The service was rebranded to Ziggo Sport Totaal on 12 November 2015.

The channels are available on digital cable of most Dutch cable companies. Satellite provider Canal Digitaal only provides three channels.

Old logo as Sport1

== Channels ==
- Ziggo Sport: The primary channel
- Ziggo Sport 2: Football channel
- Ziggo Sport 3: Racing channel
- Ziggo Sport 4: Tennis channel
- Ziggo Sport 5: Sports Documentary channel
- Ziggo Sport 6: Golf channel
- Ziggo Sport On Demand: Sports highlights on-demand S-VOD service
- Ziggo Sport Totaal Go: Live app

Ziggo Sport, which offers live broadcasts of major sporting events was exclusive to Ziggo subscribers and not included with Ziggo Sport Totaal. However, Ziggo Sport and Ziggo Sport Select merged into 1 television channel on 2 July, 2024.

== Coverage ==
=== Football ===
- UEFA Champions League
- UEFA Europa League
- UEFA Conference League
- UEFA Super Cup
- UEFA Youth League
- UEFA European Championship qualifying (Excluding the Dutch national team)
- UEFA Nations League (Excluding the Dutch national team)
- UEFA Futsal Championship
- Africa Cup of Nations
- English Women's Super League
- Spanish La Liga
- Copa del Rey
- Supercopa de España
- Ligue 1
- Italian Serie A
- Coppa Italia
- Supercoppa
- DFB Pokal
- Primeira Liga
- Scottish Premiership
- Scottish Cup

=== Tennis ===
- Wimbledon
- ATP World Tour Masters 1000
- ATP World Tour 500
- ATP World Tour 250
- ATP World Tour Finals
- WTA 1000
- WTA 500
- WTA 250
- WTA Finals
- Davis Cup
- Billie Jean King Cup

=== Motorsport ===
- MotoGP
- Moto2
- Moto3
- Asia Talent Cup
- IMSA
- IndyCar Series
- NASCAR Cup Series
- NASCAR Xfinity Series
- NASCAR Truck Series
- GT World Challenge Europe
- Formula E
- V8 Supercars
- Porsche Supercup
- Superbike World Championship (Highlights only)

=== Golf ===
- The Masters Tournament
- PGA European Tour
- PGA Tour
- Ryder Cup
- World Golf Championships
- Presidents Cup
- LPGA Tour

=== Rugby ===
- Rugby World Cup
- Six Nations
- Six Nations Under 20s Championship
- Rugby Europe

=== Athletics ===
- Diamond League
- World Athletics Continental Tour

=== Others ===
- FIS Snowboard World Cup
- SailGP

== See also ==
- Television in the Netherlands
- Ziggo
- Ziggo Sport
