= Fifth Wall (firm) =

Venture capital firm

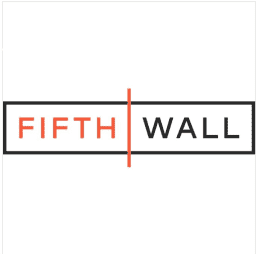
- Type: Limited Partnership
- Industry: Venture Capital
- Founded: 2016
- Headquarters: Los Angeles, California, U.S.
- Key people: Brad Greiwe, Brendan F. Wallace
- Website: fifthwall.com

Fifth Wall is a venture capital firm founded in 2016 by Brendan F. Wallace and Brad Greiwe. It manages the largest fund specialized in real estate technology The firm's name refers to a fifth wall of technology it provides in addition to the four physical walls of a building. It is part of an emerging category of "PropTech" investors. Major financial backers include large real estate industry companies that agree to be matched with the products and services of the firm's portfolio of start-up companies. The firm has separate funds for investments in emerging retail brands and climate technology to help real-estate companies reduce carbon emissions from their buildings.

== Founders ==
The firm was founded by Brad Greiwe and Brendan Wallace Greiwe co-founded single-family home rental company Invitation Homes, which went public in 2017 with a $6.7 billion valuation; it received much mainstream attention for its business practices.

Wallace graduated from Princeton University with a bachelor's degree in political science and economics in 2004, and received his MBA from the Stanford Graduate School of Business in 2010. He started his career as a real estate analyst at Goldman Sachs and worked for The Blackstone Group's real estate division. He founded Identified, a workforce optimization data and analytics company, which was acquired by Workday, Inc. in 2014. Wallace also co-founded Cabify, a ridesharing service in Latin America, in 2012. Wallace has led investments in Lyft, SpaceX, Dollar Shave Club, Bonobos, Philz Coffee, and TriNet Zenefits. He was included on the LA500 list of the most influential business executives in 2021.

== History ==
Fifth Wall was formed in 2016 and announced the close of its $212 million real estate technology fund (Fund I) in May 2017. Wallace said that the firm identified real estate technology as an underserved investment niche because the industry has traditionally used very little technology and was therefore open to disruption.

In July 2019, the firm announced the close of its second real estate technology fund, or Fund II, which closed at $503 million. While Fund I was raised from nine investors in the US only; Fund II consisted of a global investor base from over 50 investors from 11 countries. The fund's investors included CBRE Group, Cushman & Wakefield, Equity Residential, Gecina, Merlin Properties, Mitsubishi Estate, British Land, Prologis and Segro. Fund II invested in a number of companies, but was focused on business-to-business enterprises such as the California-based Cobalt Robotics.

As of February 2020, the firm managed over $1.1 billion in assets. In 2021, Fifth Wall announced that it had raised more than $1.1 billion across its funds and had a global investor base of over 90 investors. In addition, several large real estate investors announced their investments into the firm's Climate Tech Fund, including Equity Residential, Hudson Pacific Properties, Invitation Homes, and Ivanhoé Cambridge. "Real estate is kind of this massive industry when it comes to climate change, but at the same time we haven't seen the industry commit a significant amount of capital to the tech that's required to decarbonize it," Wallace said.

In 2022, Fifth Wall announced its inaugural "Climate Tech Fund," a sustainability venture fund investing in technologies that would decarbonize the real estate industry, which drives an estimated 39% of global emissions. The fund is focused on technologies related to energy efficiency, water reuse, decarbonization, climate resilience and risk management. The firm closed its climate fund with $500 million in commitments to invest in companies which decarbonize the real estate industry. This fund brought the firm's assets under management to over $3.2 billion. The firm's limited partners include Camden Property Trust, Hilton, Host Hotels & Resorts, Marriott, Koch Industries, Starwood Capital Group, Lowe's and MGM Resorts International.

== Investments ==
Fifth Wall's portfolio companies include Blend, ClassPass, Clutter, Doma (FKA States Title), Hippo, Homebound, Industrious, Lime, Opendoor, Procore, SmartRent and VTS. The firm has also invested in Allbirds, Carbon38, Cotopaxi, Foxtrot, Heyday, Interior Define, Madison Reed, Taft and Untuckit. The firm's climate fund has invested in companies such as Turntide Technologies, Assembly OSM, Brimstone, Clarity AI, ICON, Sealed, SPAN, and Wildcat Discovery Technologies.
