= Grace Lee Reynolds =

Canadian business executive

- Education: University of Waterloo (BA, MAcc)
- Occupation: Business executive
- Known for: CEO of MaRS Discovery District; CEO of Artscape
- Title: CEO, MaRS Discovery District

Grace Lee Reynolds is a Canadian business executive who has been chief executive officer (CEO) of MaRS Discovery District since February 2025. She was CEO of Artscape Inc. from 2021 to 2023, and held senior leadership roles at MaRS Discovery District from 2011 to 2021, including chief financial officer and president of MaRS Discovery Enterprises.

== Career ==
=== MaRS Discovery District (2011–2021) ===
Reynolds joined MaRS Discovery District in 2011, initially as director of finance. She subsequently was chief financial officer from 2014 to 2020, and as president of MaRS Discovery Enterprises Inc. and chief ecosystem officer. During this period she was involved in the development of the 1.5-million-square-foot MaRS Centre in downtown Toronto and in the organization's finance and partnership functions.

=== Artscape (2021–2023) ===
On 2 February 2021, Artscape, a Toronto-based not-for-profit that developed and operated affordable studio and community cultural spaces, announced Reynolds' appointment as chief executive officer, effective 1 April 2021. She succeeded Tim Jones, who had led Artscape for 22 years.

On 28 August 2023, Artscape announced that it would be placed into receivership and wind down its management of cultural spaces, after attempts to sell the Launchpad property had failed and TD declined to extend credit. The Globe and Mail subsequently reported, citing court filings, that the organization owed more than $21 million to TD, had long-term debt of $31.7 million at the end of 2022, and had run a $3.7 million operating deficit that year. An investigative report found that Artscape's debt had more than doubled from $17.6 million at the end of 2017 to $37.5 million by the end of 2019, driven largely by the development of the Launchpad facility, which cost approximately $31 million to build but was listed for sale at $22.5 million. In November 2023, Artscape and the City of Toronto announced that a new non-profit, ArtHubs Toronto Inc., would take over operations at Artscape's community hubs, with Reynolds as an interim director of ArtHubs Toronto. alongside COO Kelly Rintoul and CFO Martin Seaton. On 11 January 2024, the Ontario SuperiorCourt formally appointed msi Spergel Inc. as receiver.

=== Return to MaRS and appointment as CEO (2024–present) ===
Reynolds returned to MaRS Discovery District as head of development and programming. On 23 December 2024, MaRS announced that CEO Alison Nankivell would depart after nine months in the role to become president and CEO of Export Development Canada, and named Reynolds interim CEO effective 5 February 2025.

On 4 February 2025, one day before the interim appointment was to take effect, MaRS announced that Reynolds had been named permanent CEO. The organization simultaneously appointed Helen Angus, CEO of AMS Healthcare, and Andrew Joyner, managing director of Tricon Residential, to its board of directors. Board chair Annette Verschuren stated that Reynolds' "leadership will help MaRS strengthen its position as a unified, agile innovation hub that fuels venture growth."

As CEO, Reynolds has said her priorities include enhancing support systems for science and technology ventures, advancing Canada's health, deep science and climate technology ecosystem, expanding private-sector and philanthropic funding models, and optimizing MaRS' real estate assets. In April 2025, she commented publicly on the impact of tariffs on Canadian startups, citing a MaRS survey that found more than three-quarters of respondents expected tariffs to affect their business.
