= MaRS Discovery District =

Scientific research centre in Toronto, Canada

Coordinates: 43°39′35″N 79°23′20″W

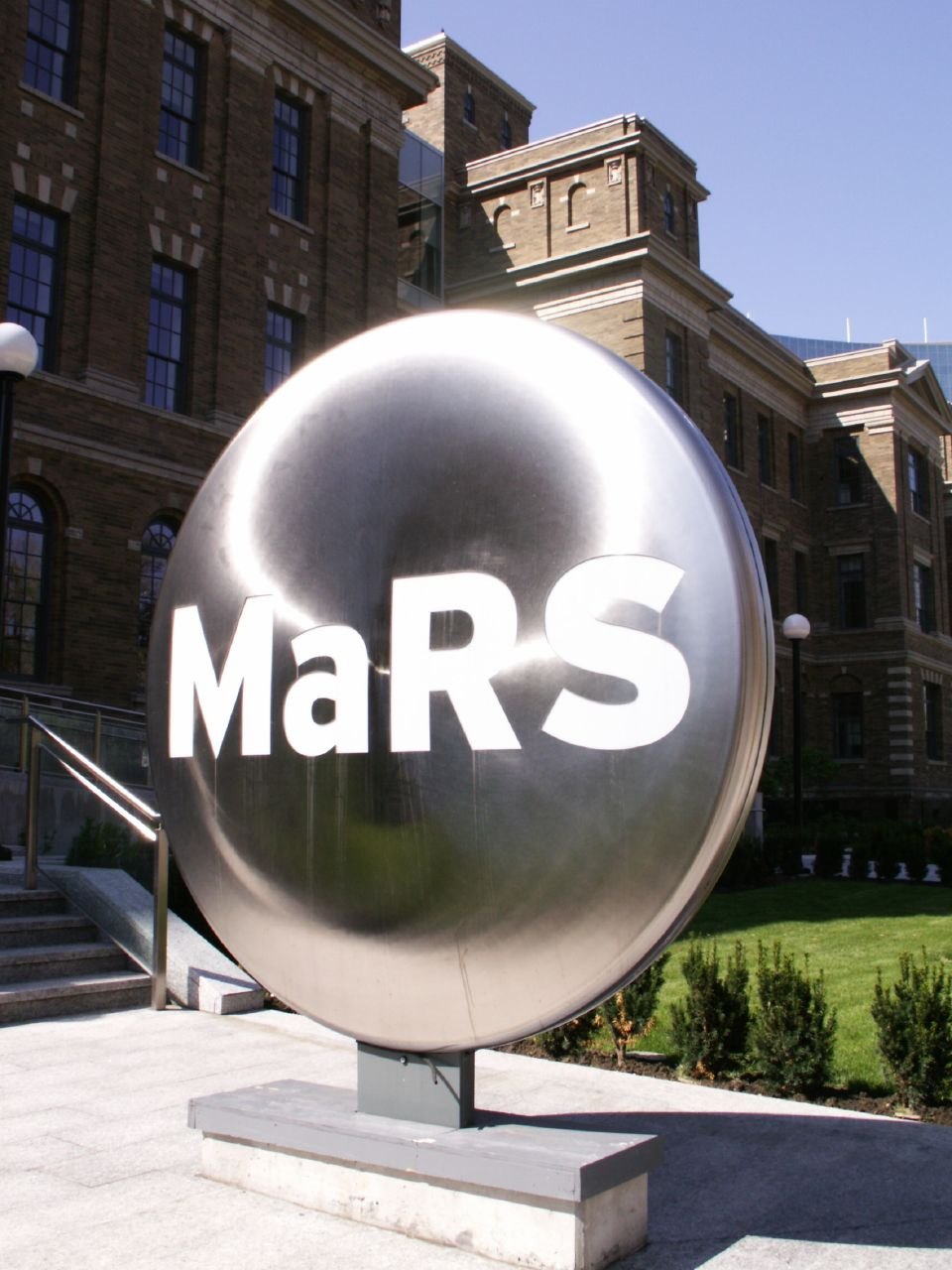

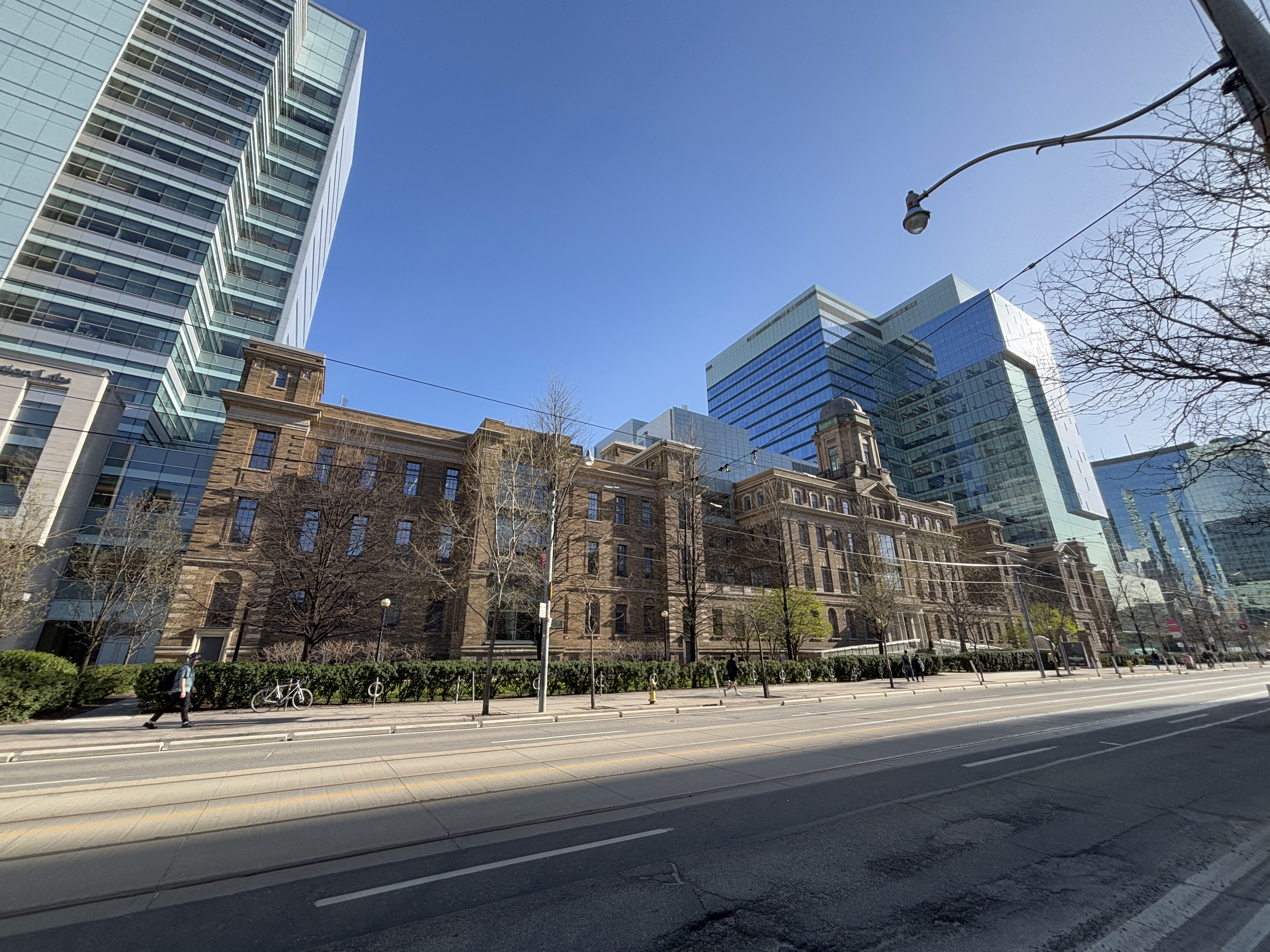
- Founded: May 31, 2000
- Type: Charitable trust
- Purpose: Technology transfer, commercialization
- Location: Toronto, Ontario, Canada
- Method: Consultancy, market research, venture capital
- Key people: Grace Lee Reynolds, CEO
- Website: www.marsdd.com

MaRS Discovery District is a not-for-profit corporation and charitable trust in Toronto, Ontario, Canada, that operates a 1,500,000-square-foot (140,000 m^{2}) innovation centre on University Avenue.

Founded in 2000, its stated mission is to commercialize publicly funded research by connecting startups with advisory services and venture capital.

It is located in Toronto's Discovery District, adjacent to the University of Toronto and the University Health Network.

The name MaRS was originally drawn from a file name, and later attributed with the title "Medical and Related Sciences". MaRS has since expanded beyond medical research into information and communications technology, engineering, and social innovation.

As of 2023, approximately 59 percent of MaRS's revenue came from government funding. The organization is led by CEO Grace Lee Reynolds, appointed in 2025.

Its stated goal is to commercialize publicly funded medical research and other technologies with the help of local private enterprises and as such is a public-private partnership. As part of its mission MaRS says, "MaRS helps create successful global businesses from Canada's science, technology and social innovation."

== History ==
=== Founding ===
MaRS was conceived in 1999 by John Evans, a former president of the University of Toronto and founding dean of the McMaster University medical school. Evans, who had led the Canada Foundation for Innovation, recognized that Canada lagged in commercializing publicly funded research despite strong basic science.. He assembled a group of civic leaders, including Lawrence Bloomberg and Joseph Rotman, who each contributed over $1 million toward acquiring 5.2 acres (2.1 ha) of land from the University Health Network.

MaRS was formally incorporated on May 31, 2000. The Ontario government provided $20 million in initial funding in 2002, matched by the federal government, followed by $50.5 million from the McGuinty government between 2003 and 2005. Phase 1 of the MaRS Centre opened in 2005.

=== Growth and programs ===
In 2008, MaRS and Ontario Centres of Excellence launched the Investment Accelerator Fund (IAF), which invested approximately $80 million across more than 170 Ontario technology companies over the following decade. In 2022, a private sector venture capital fund, Graphite Ventures was spun off from the IAF, which raised $100 million in its first independent fund. The MaRS IAF continued independent investments in 2023 under a rebuilt team.

In 2019, MaRS launched the Momentum scale-up program using part of CA$17.5 million in federal funding received through FedDev Ontario's Scale-Up Platform. The inaugural cohort comprised 53 companies with combined annual revenue of $905 million; MaRS projected that with 20 percent annual growth, more than 20 of them could surpass $100 million in annual revenue within five years.

In 2021, MaRS launched the Mission from MaRS Climate Impact Challenge, selecting 10 Canadian ventures as "Climate Champions" working to reduce emissions in the energy, real estate, and transportation sectors. Carbon Engineering, which removes CO_{2} directly from the atmosphere, was among those selected.

MaRS also operates a Capital Program that connects startups with venture capital investors, and has hosted corporate innovation programs with tenants including CIBC, Manulife, and Moneris.

=== Phase 2 and the West Tower ===
In 2007, Alexandria Real Estate Equities won a competition to develop Phase 2, an 780,000-square-foot (72,000 m^{2}) addition in the form of a 20-storey tower on the complex's west side, designed by Bregman + Hamann Architects. Construction began in late 2007 but was halted in November 2008 due to the global financial crisis. Work resumed in July 2011 with provincial financial support.

The building, later renamed the West Tower, became the subject of significant political controversy when the Ontario government committed $309 million in public funds after MaRS was unable to lease sufficient space to service its Infrastructure Ontario loan (see Criticism). By 2016, the tower was largely leased, with tenants including Facebook Canada, Airbnb, and Autodesk. In February 2017, MaRS completed a $290 million private financing led by Manulife, Sun Life Financial, and iA Financial Group, repaying three-quarters of the provincial loans nearly three years ahead of schedule.

=== 2024 restructuring ===
In June 2024, MaRS cut approximately 20 positions as part of a restructuring under new CEO Alison Nankivell, who had been appointed in March 2024. The organization's net revenues had fallen 15% from pre-pandemic levels. A second round of 19 further cuts followed later in 2024, bringing total headcount to approximately 101 employees.

Nankivell departed after nine months to become CEO of Export Development Canada. Grace Lee Reynolds, who had served as interim CEO, was appointed permanently in 2025.

== Facilities ==
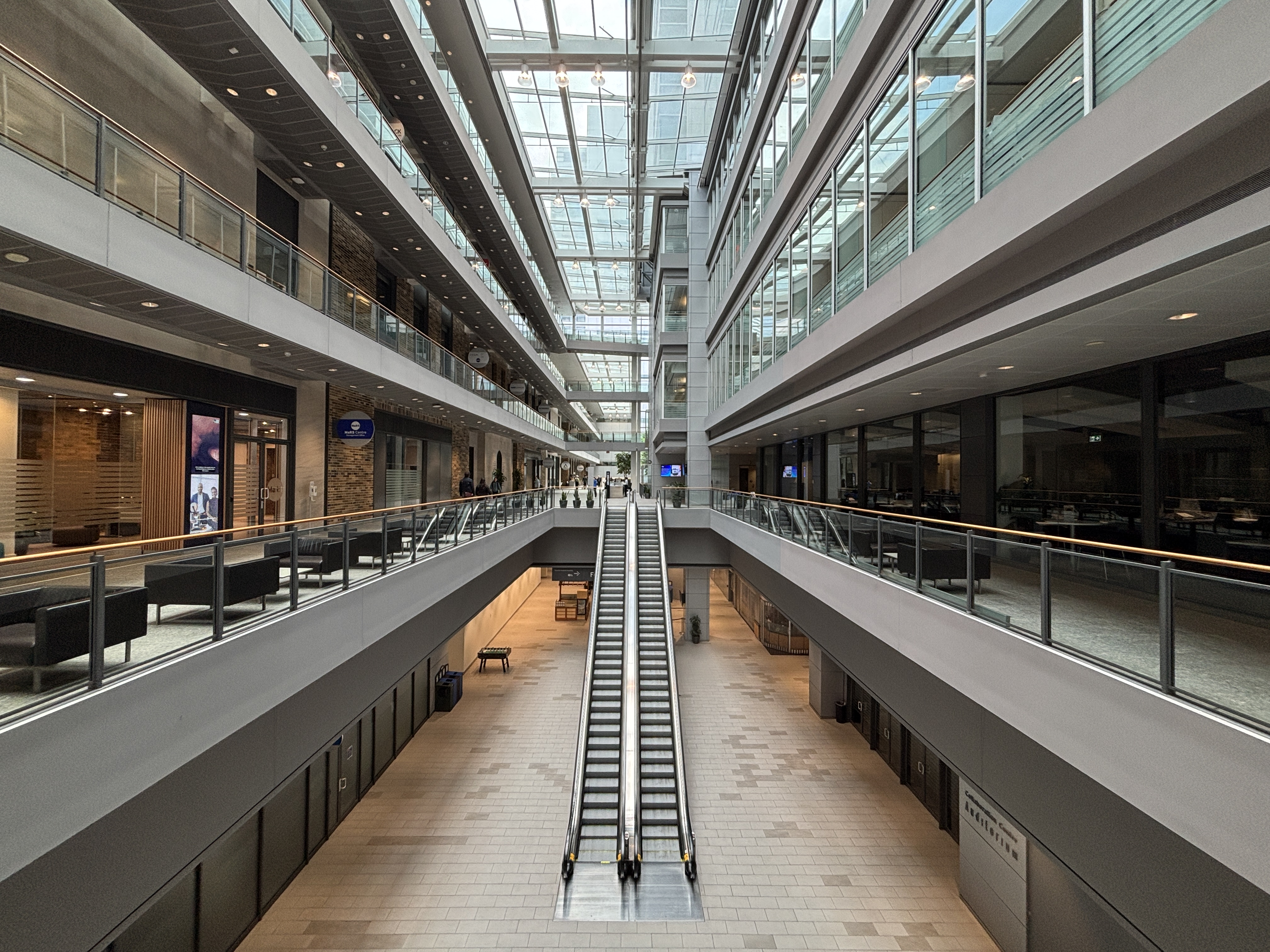
The Atrium

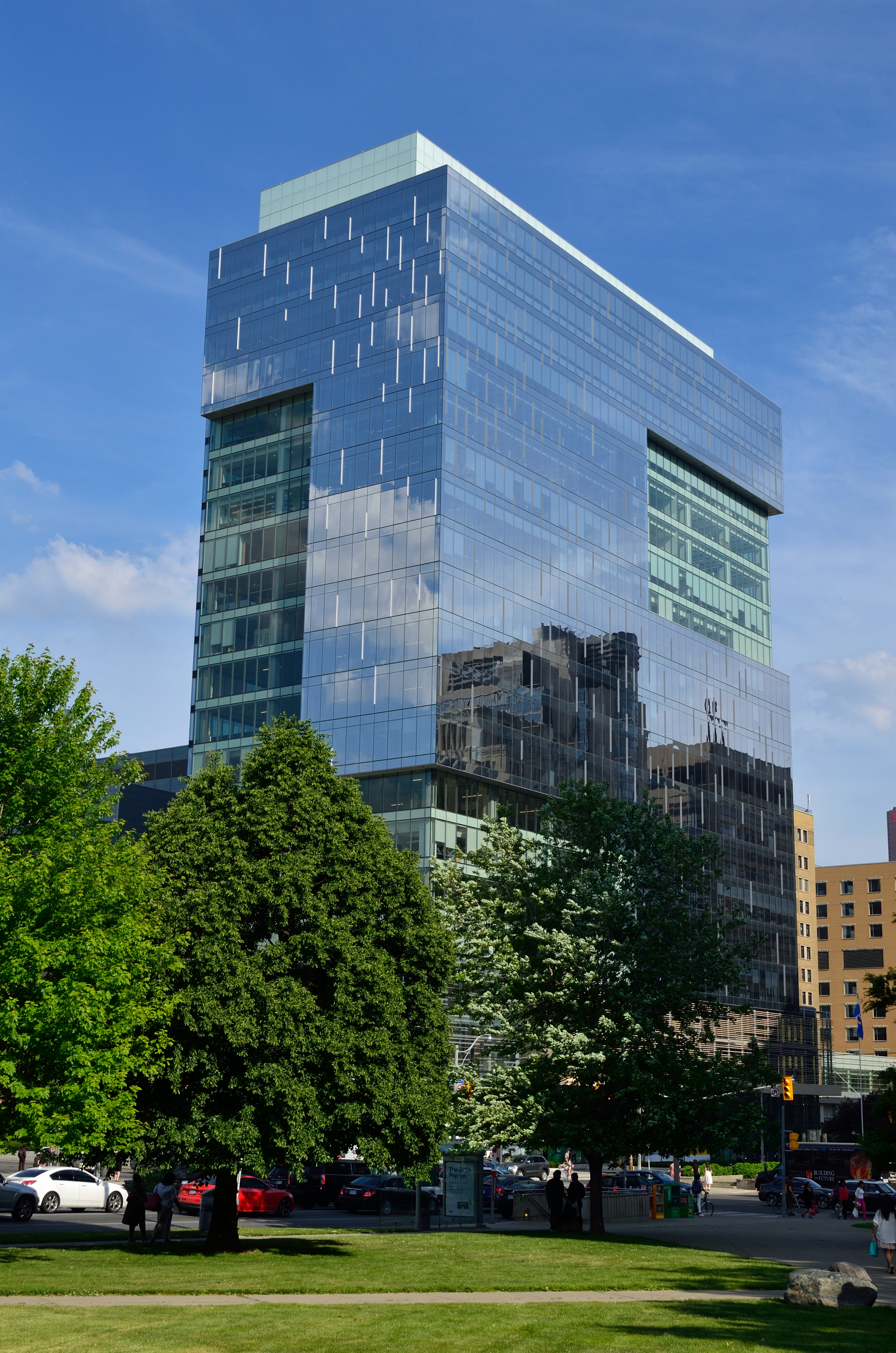
Completed MaRS Phase 2 in 2016

The MaRS Centre is located on the corner of College Street and University Avenue, adjacent to the University of Toronto's St. George campus and the University Health Network. The development consists of two phases.

=== Phase 1 ===
MaRS Discovery District Phase 1 was designed by Adamson Associates Architects and opened in 2005.

==== The Heritage Building ====
The Heritage Building preserves the four-storey brick facade of a wing of the former Toronto General Hospital, designed by Pearson and Darling and opened in 1911. The hospital site was historically significant as the location where insulin, heparin, and the first artificial kidney machine in North America were developed.In 2006, the renovation received the Heritage Toronto Award of Excellence for Architectural Conservation and Craftsmanship.

==== Atrium ====
The Atrium is a glass-roofed public thoroughfare connecting the Heritage Building to the South and Medical Discovery Towers. Its lower level contains conference facilities, a media centre, and a food court.

==== South Tower ====
The eight-storey, 200,000-square-foot (19,000 m^{2}) South Tower houses incubator programs and shared laboratory facilities. The upper floors of the South Tower contain the MaRS Incubator, providing office and laboratory space for approximately two dozen firms.

==== Toronto Medical Discovery Tower ====
The 15-storey Toronto Medical Discovery Tower (TMDT) contains 400,000 square feet (37,000 m^{2}) of wet lab space and houses basic research activities of the University Health Network. Construction was financed through a $100 million bond issue by the MaRS Development Trust, serviced by the University Health Network under a credit tenant lease.

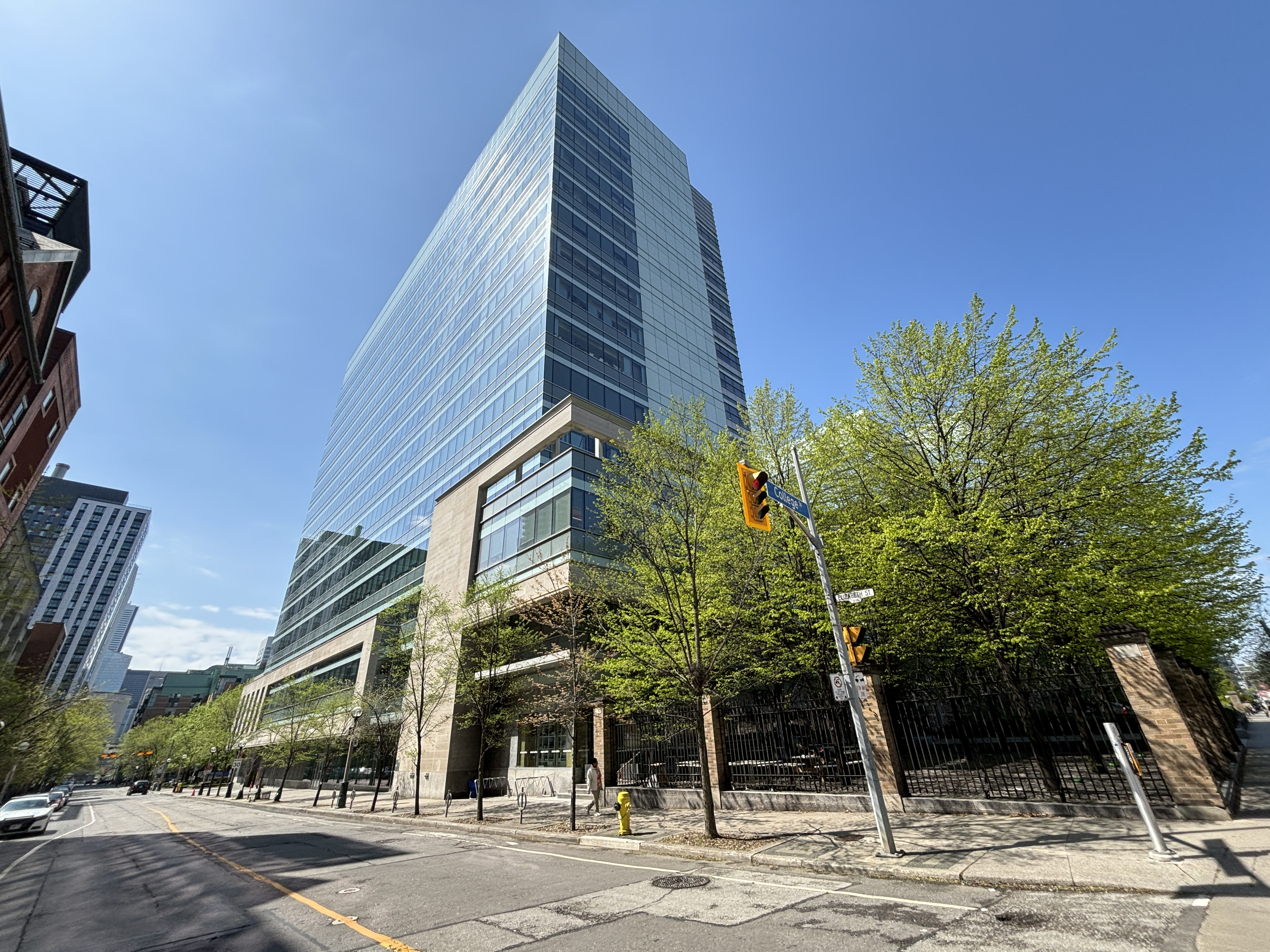
Toronto Medical Discovery Tower exterior

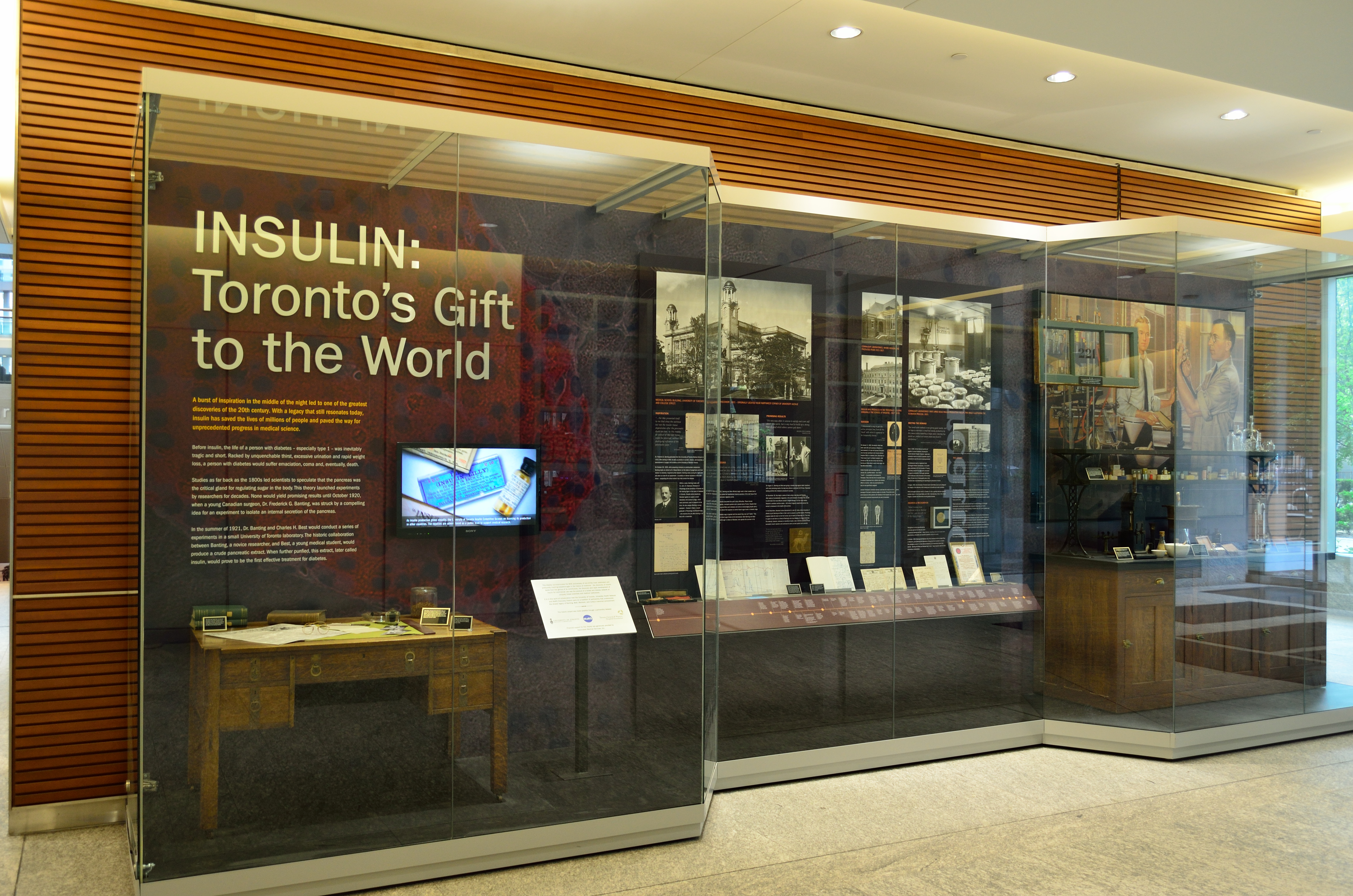
Insulin Exhibit

=== West Tower ===
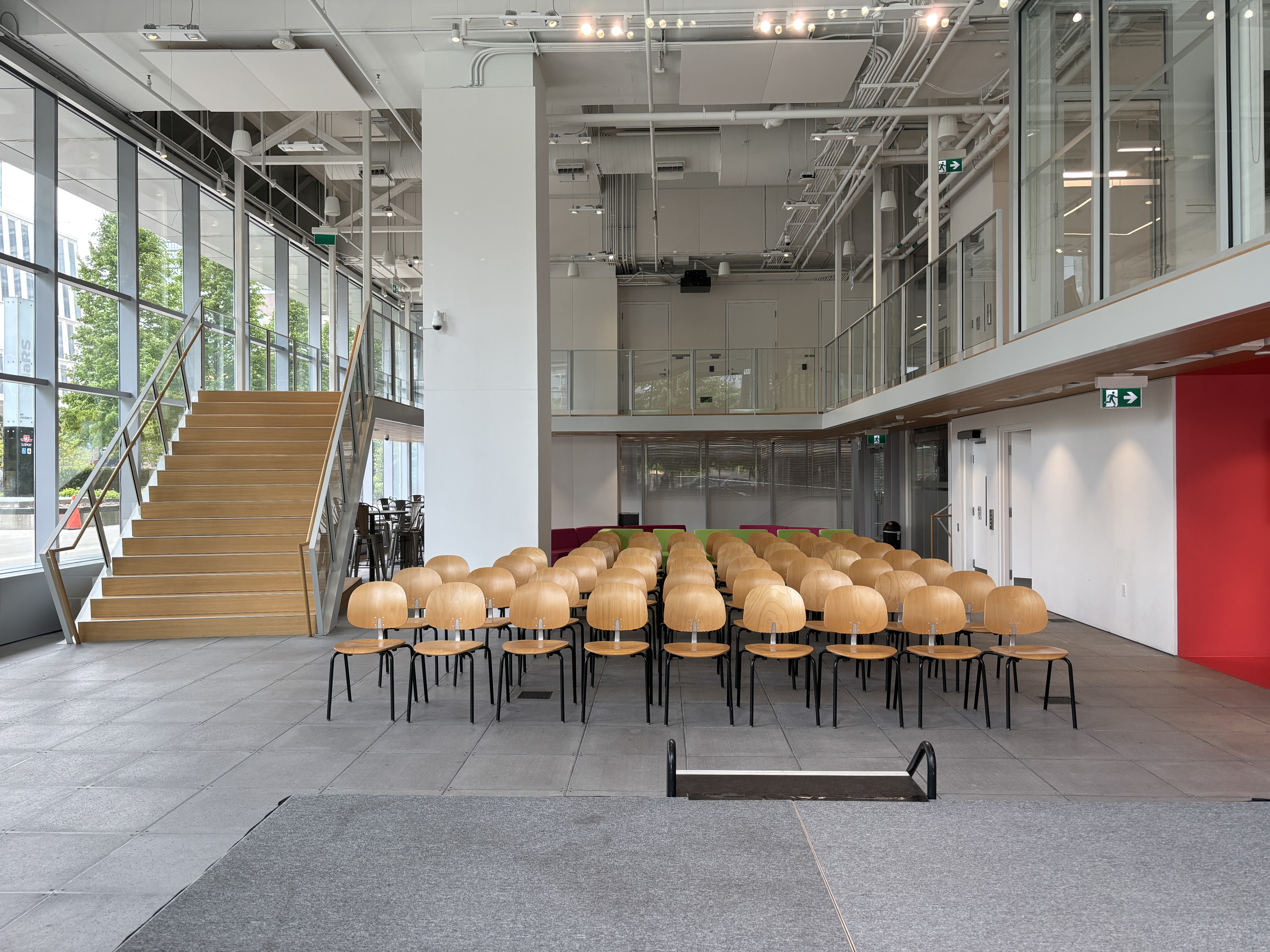
Function room

The West Tower (formerly Phase 2) is a 20-storey 780,000-square-foot (72,000 m^{2}) tower designed by Bregman + Hamann Architects on the complex's west side. Alexandria Real Estate Equities was selected to develop the tower in 2007. Construction began in late 2007 but was halted in November 2008 during the global financial crisis.

Construction resumed in July 2011 after the Ontario government provided a $224 million loan through Infrastructure Ontario. However, MaRS was unable to fill more than one-third of the tower, in part because Alexandria's contractual terms prevented MaRS from reducing lease rates to attract tenants. In September 2014, the province committed a total of $309 million, including a $65 million buyout of Alexandria's stake (see Criticism).

Major tenants began moving in during 2015-2016, including Facebook Canada, Autodesk (occupying 60,000 square feet (5,600 m^{2}) on two floors), and IBM. By November 2016, 93 percent of the building had been leased. The building achieved LEED Platinum and BOMA BEST Platinum certifications.

== Leadership ==
MaRS has had four chief executives since its founding. John Evans served as founding chairman until his death in 2015, while operational leadership passed through a series of CEOs, most recently amid significant organizational turnover during the 2024 restructuring.

Period	Role	Name
2000-2015	Founder and Chairman	John Evans
2005-2017	CEO	Ilse Treurnicht
2017-2023	CEO	Yung Wu
Mar-Dec 2024	CEO	Alison Nankivell
2025-present	CEO	Grace Lee Reynolds

== Supporters ==
MaRS receives in-kind donations from professional service organizations and receives funding from the Government of Ontario, the Government of Canada, and private donors.

== Criticism ==
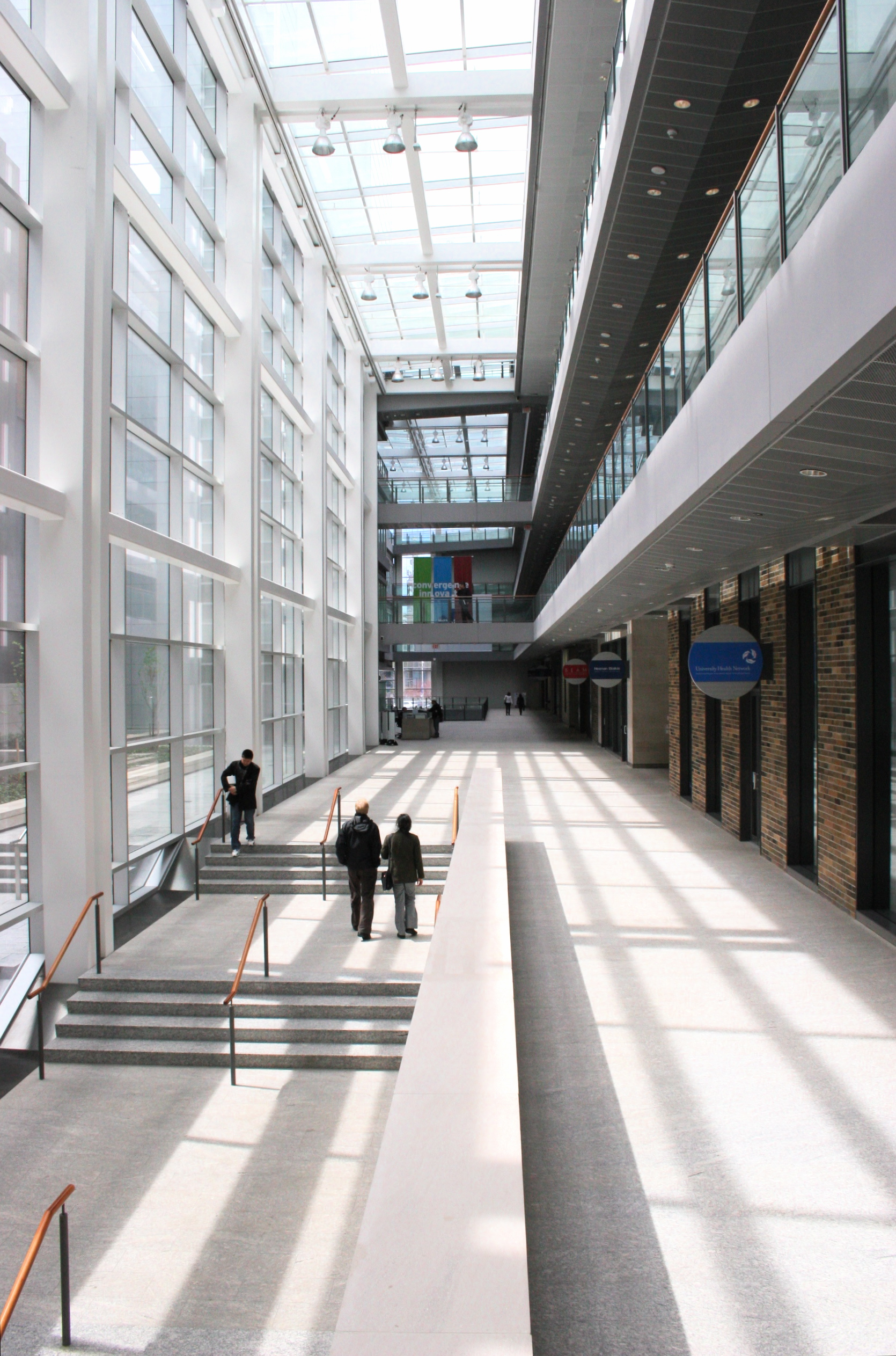
Inside the MaRS Centre atrium

In April 2010, criticism of the $471,874 salary collected by MaRS CEO Ilse Treurnicht in 2008 was raised. It also criticized Liberal government-led funding, lack of accountability and rigor in measuring results, claims of public–private partnerships and the absence of visible minorities among MaRS's team of advisors.

On August 27, 2010, the National Post relayed some of these criticisms

Renewed criticism was published in 2011, pointing in particular to the $100,000 increase in Treurnicht's salary, her $534,000 salary in 2010, and questioning the public and private funding of the Phase II expansion. The Toronto Sun published articles on the topic as well, questioning the high compensation levels at the charitable trust institution.
