= SmartAsset =

American financial technology company

- Type: Privately Held Company
- Industry: financial technology personal finance
- Founder: Michael Carvin (CEO); Philip Camilleri (CTO)
- Headquarters: New York, NY
- Area served: United States
- Website: smartasset.com

SmartAsset is a financial technology company, founded in July 2012 by Michael Carvin and Phillip Camilleri and headquartered in New York, New York. The company publishes articles, guides, reviews, studies, calculators and tools related to personal finance. Its personal finance coverage has been cited by CNBC, the Wall Street Journal, CBS News, Fast Company, and others.

SmartAsset also operates SmartAdvisor, a digital platform that connects consumers with financial advisors.

== History ==
SmartAsset launched in July 2012 by CEO Michael Carvin and CTO Philip Camilleri as a Y Combinator startup company. The company's product offering initially revolved around home buying. It expanded to include tools, financial calculators and articles about personal finance topics, including taxes, retirement, banking and investing.

The company launched a platform called Captivate that enables financial publishers to host its tools on their own online content in 2015.

In 2018, SmartAsset launched SmartAdvisor, a lead generation platform that connects consumers with financial advisors.

SmartAsset's personal finance studies and coverage have been cited by CNBC, the Wall Street Journal, Fast Company, CBS News, and others.

== Investment and finances ==
SmartAsset raised more than $161 million across funding rounds, including $110 million in a 2021 Series D round. The round valued the company at over $1 billion, making it a unicorn. Investors include Y Combinator, Focus Financial Partners, SV Angel, Brendan F. Wallace, Quotidian Ventures, IA Capital Group and others.

== Awards ==
- The Webby Awards Runner-up 2013
- The Webby Awards Honoree 2014

== See also ==
- TheStreet
