= Captain Midnight broadcast signal intrusion =

1986 signal intrusion of HBO's satellite feed

Captain Midnight
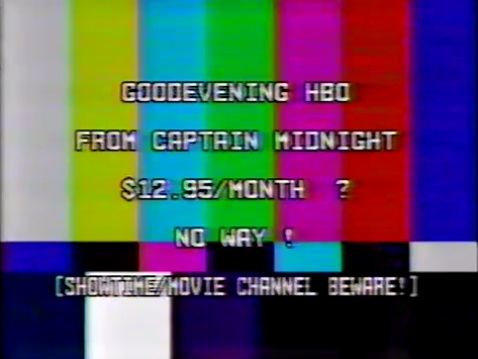
- Message seen in 1986, as superimposed on the SMPTE color bars
- Date: April 27, 1986; 40 years ago
- Time: 12:32 AM EST (5:32 AM UTC)
- Duration: 4.5 minutes
- Location: Ocala, Florida, U.S.
- Type: Broadcast signal intrusion
- Motive: To protest against charges for access to scrambled satellite channels
- Target: Home Box Office (HBO)
- Participants: John R. MacDougall (using the pseudonym "Captain Midnight")
- Outcome: Fine and probation
- Resulted in the development of the Automatic Transmitter Identification System

On April 27, 1986, American electrical engineer and business owner John R. MacDougall (using the pseudonym "Captain Midnight") jammed the Home Box Office (HBO) satellite signal on Galaxy 1 during a showing of the film The Falcon and the Snowman. The message, broadcast for 4.5 minutes, was seen by the eastern half of the United States (accounting for more than half of HBO's 14.6 million subscribers at the time) protesting HBO's rates for satellite dish owners, which he considered too expensive. MacDougall was working at his second job as an operations engineer at the Central Florida Teleport uplink station in Ocala, Florida, and vied with a technician at HBO's communications center in Hauppauge, New York, for control of the transmission. The technician attempted to increase uplink power but gave up because of the risk of damaging the satellite. MacDougall eventually abandoned his control of the satellite.

The Federal Communications Commission (FCC), with assistance from the Federal Bureau of Investigation (FBI), investigated the jamming. After the FCC identified the transmitters and stations equipped with the specific character generator used during the incident, MacDougall surrendered to the authorities. Under an agreement with the prosecutor, he plea bargained and was sanctioned with a $5,000 fine (equivalent to $14,686 in 2025), one-year unsupervised probation, and a one-year suspension of his amateur radio license. The jamming received much attention in the U.S., with one executive dubbing the intrusion an act of "video terrorism". As a consequence of the incident, the United States Congress passed the Electronic Communications Privacy Act of 1986 (18 U.S.C. § 1367), making satellite hijacking a felony. The Automatic Transmitter Identification System was also developed in response to this incident.

== Background ==
=== Scrambling of satellite transmissions ===
Beginning in the late 1920s, when the first experimental transmissions began, broadcast television was delivered for free over local frequencies in the United States. When the industry began charging viewers for access to premium services via cable, free broadcasts continued. Starting in the 1970s, a small community of satellite television enthusiasts (mostly engineers) shared the technology and knowledge of how to construct satellite dishes, as well as how to access pay television from the airwaves for free. This was not illegal at the time, and restaurant and hotel chains made use of this technology to distribute programming to guests and patrons without charge.

In the mid-1980s, controversy erupted in the cable programming world as American media companies that owned pay television channels began scrambling their programming and charging fees to home satellite dish owners who accessed the same satellite signals that cable operators received. Many satellite dish owners faced the prospect of having to purchase descrambling equipment at a cost of hundreds of dollars, as well as having to pay monthly or annual subscription fees to cable programming providers. Fees for home dish owners were often higher than fees paid by cable subscribers, despite dish owners being responsible for acquiring and servicing their own equipment.

When Home Box Office (HBO) began scrambling its signal on a 24-hour basis on January 15, 1986, it offered subscriptions to home dish owners for $12.95 per month ($37.79 in 2025 US dollars), which was either equal to or slightly higher than what cable subscribers paid. HBO also advised viewers that purchasing a descrambler for $395 ($933.80 in 2020 dollars) would (along with the monthly fee) allow them to continue watching HBO. Several satellite dish dealers across the U.S. closed their stores as a result of a reduction in dish sales, caused by the rise in signal scrambling. Dish owners began protests over keeping free access to broadcasts. One such protest was by members of the Satellite Television Industry Association, who converged on Washington, D.C., in March 1986 to urge the United States Congress to protect access to satellite transmissions.

=== Perpetrator ===
John R. MacDougall
- Born: 1960 or 1961; Elmhurst, Illinois, U.S.
- Other name: Captain Midnight
- Education: American Heritage School; Worcester Polytechnic Institute (did not graduate)
- Occupations: Electrical engineer, business owner
- Criminal charges: Illegally operating a satellite uplink transmitter
- Criminal penalty: $5,000 fine: 1 year of unsupervised probation; Amateur radio license suspended for 1 year
- Call sign: KA4WJA
- Website: macdougallelect.com

John R. MacDougall was born in Elmhurst, Illinois, a western suburb of Chicago, in 1960 or 1961. He was the youngest of five children to building contractor Robert MacDougall and his wife Thelma, a homemaker. Shortly after his father's retirement in 1970, the family moved to Fort Lauderdale, Florida, where MacDougall was educated at American Heritage School. Having spent his childhood years tinkering with cars and CB radios, MacDougall spent two years of studying in a management engineering program at Worcester Polytechnic Institute. He eventually abandoned his studies and found employment installing satellite dishes in Ocala.

In 1983, MacDougall opened the satellite dealership MacDougall Electronics in Ocala. The company initially turned a healthy profit, but following the scrambling of HBO's signal on January 15, 1986, its turnover declined. Consequently, MacDougall reduced his expenses where possible and in the same month was offered a part-time job at the Central Florida Teleport uplink station (which uplinked services to satellites) as an operations engineer to help him pay his bills. As he was not receiving any customers, MacDougall pulled all company advertising and saved money by switching off his air conditioning. He became increasingly reclusive during this period, watching television and reading magazines. MacDougall later said of the experience: "I have been watching the great American dream slip from my grasp."

MacDougall wrote protest letters to legislators, and spent a large amount of money to raise awareness about wanting to keep the market free from excessive charging of its services. At 12:49 a.m. Eastern Standard Time (EST) on April 20, one week before the jamming, MacDougall transmitted a color bar test pattern that was superimposed on HBO's signal for a brief period. HBO did not investigate this incident, as it had occurred during the overnight hours, and as a result, very few people had been watching at the time. (Note: The April 20 intrusion went unreported to the FCC until after the following week's jamming.)

== Jamming ==
The full recording of the broadcast signal intrusion, as it happened live on television in 1986

On April 26, 1986, MacDougall worked at his shop as usual, and closed at 4:00 p.m. EST. After eating dinner, he reported to Central Florida Teleport with one other engineer on duty. The second engineer left at 6:00 p.m., leaving MacDougall to operate the building on his own. MacDougall oversaw the uplink of the movie Pee-wee's Big Adventure as part of the evening's programming for the pay-per-view network People's Choice, which used Central Florida Teleport's facilities. After the film ended, he went through his regular routine. Before logging off, MacDougall set up SMPTE color bars and used a Quanta Corporation Microgen MG-100 character generator that placed letters on the television screen. He spent a couple of minutes composing his message. MacDougall began his message with a polite greeting as he did not wish to be insulting. He selected the name "Captain Midnight" from a film he had recently seen, On the Air Live with Captain Midnight (unrelated to the popular Captain Midnight radio show of the 1940s).

MacDougall swung the 30-foot (9.1 m) transmission dish back into its storage position, which aimed it at the location of Galaxy 1, the satellite that carried HBO. Locating the satellite coordinates was not of great difficulty for MacDougall as frequencies were widely published in manuals and enthusiast magazines. As a protest against the introduction of high fees and scrambling equipment, MacDougall transmitted a signal onto the satellite that for 4.5 minutes overrode HBO's telecast of the 1985 film The Falcon and the Snowman, which had begun 2 minutes earlier. The five-line text message printed in white capital letters that appeared on the screens of HBO subscribers across the eastern half of the U.S. (accounting for more than half of HBO's 14.6 million subscribers at the time), starting at 12:32 a.m. EST (05:32 UTC (Note: In 1986, the switch from Eastern Standard Time (EST) to Eastern Daylight Time (EDT) occurred on the night of April 26–27, at 2:00 a.m. local time, so the Captain Midnight prank occurred a little less than 1.5 hours before the beginning of EDT.)) on April 27, read as follows:

GOODEVENING HBO
FROM CAPTAIN MIDNIGHT
$12.95/MONTH ?
NO WAY !
[SHOWTIME/MOVIE CHANNEL BEWARE!]

Hughes Communications, owner of the Galaxy 1 satellite, immediately noticed the jamming and threatened to shut down HBO's satellite signal or alter the satellite's course, with executives believing the hacker was a domestic terrorist. HBO's technician, working at the company's communication center in Hauppauge, Long Island, New York, telephoned Hughes Communications, but officials there could not offer an explanation for the jamming. The HBO technician attempted to regain control by increasing the uplink transmission power from 125 watts to 2,000 watts. This was unsuccessful, as MacDougall increased his power in a control battle that lasted about 90 seconds, during which it was feared that a further power increase would damage the satellite. MacDougall became scared, abandoned his control of the satellite, and went home. He felt guilty about his actions the following day, but hoped the jamming would not be noticed by anyone not working for HBO. MacDougall was later surprised to see his actions being reported on network television. Thus, when he returned to work that night he pretended to have no knowledge about the intrusion, and asked questions about what had happened. MacDougall only told close friends, and had visions of federal agents visiting his home.

== Investigation ==
Galaxy 1 carried HBO on transponder 23 at a rate of 125 watts, with relay signals sent out at 6.385 GHz. Mother Jones magazine determined that MacDougall could have potentially taken over the signals of three additional satellites. He could have taken control of the network feed of CBS had he positioned his satellite dish at the Telstar 301 satellite, operated by AT&T, tuned at 6.065 GHz. He also could have taken over the foreign language feed of the Voice of America network by aiming his satellite dish at 72 degrees west longitude. The final theorized hijacking would have been aiming his satellite dish at 100 degrees west longitude, above the Galápagos Islands, with a frequency setting of 293.375 MHz, thereby jamming the signal of United States Navy satellite Fleetsatcom 1. The magazine also posited that an amateur hobbyist could hijack the satellites that alerted U.S. military forces to Soviet actions, creating confusion for world leaders and placing the world at risk of nuclear destruction.

Although the intrusion caused minor annoyance to viewers, HBO contacted the Federal Communications Commission (FCC) and announced that the hijacker would face prosecution. The commission's chief, Richard Smith, assembled staff in his office for an emergency meeting at the FCC headquarters eight hours after the intrusion to discuss how the culprit should be caught. On April 28, the chairman of HBO, Michael J. Fuchs, wrote to the FCC saying the company had received calls threatening to place Galaxy 1 into a different orbit, but the company was unable to determine whether these were credible threats or not. Fuchs' letter additionally urged the commission to use all of its resources to capture the culprit. In the days after the jamming, more than 200 people called the Federal Bureau of Investigation (FBI) to "confess" that they were Captain Midnight.

The Department of Justice made indications of its desire to get involved, and the FBI was called in to assist the investigation. One hundred FCC field offices and monitoring stations across the U.S. were actively involved in the investigation, with no fewer than six FCC employees working on the case. Oliver Long, the head engineer of the FCC's Texas field office, oversaw the investigation, and the commission assigned agent George Dillon to the case. The case first led investigators from the FCC to focus on the Dallas–Fort Worth metroplex, after an anonymous tip accused an amateur radio operator residing in Lewisville, Texas, of being the culprit.

Later, the FCC determined which teleport uplink sites out of the 2,000 licensed transmitters in the U.S. had the capability to override the HBO signal. That narrowed it down to 580 uplink sites that had sufficiently large antennas that had the capability of broadcasting the signal. The manufacturer that produced the character generator graphics model used to generate the typeface on the television screen was also identified after studying footage of the jamming. Investigators from the commission obtained copies from an FCC engineer and HBO viewers, as tape machines were not running during the jamming. The FCC removed stations from the list of 500 that were inoperative on April 27 or transmitting other material. This method brought the number of potential stations down to twelve. After FCC investigators visited these stations, there were now three prime suspects which included MacDougall. The commission later learned an accountant from Wisconsin had overheard MacDougall bragging about the jamming at a payphone in a rest area off Interstate 75 in Gainesville, Florida, and obtained a license plate number of a car owned by MacDougall.

== Arrest and prosecution ==
Prior to the jamming, the FCC warned that anyone interfering with television signals would be harshly dealt with, and MacDougall was charged after surrendering to the authorities following media and industry pressure. (Note: The FCC is responsible for ensuring nobody interferes with the licensed airwaves transmitted in the United States.) Investigators from the commission spoke to MacDougall in July (he lost his job at Central Florida Teleport beforehand due to the closure of People's Choice), asking him questions that led him to believe that the commission was aware of the incident. Two FCC agents visited MacDougall's house two weeks later along with U.S. Attorney Lawrence Gentile III, who served MacDougall with a subpoena to appear in Jacksonville's U.S. District Court. In their meeting, MacDougall claimed not to have committed any crime. According to MacDougall, Gentile tried to make an agreement that if MacDougall discussed the incident, Gentile would be willing to recommend a small fine and probation to the judge. At that time, MacDougall stated that he started to feel that there was not enough evidence to convict him, and despite continuing to protest his innocence, MacDougall told Gentile he would attend court.

MacDougall contacted attorney John Green Jr., who advised him the chances of him winning the case were 70 percent and that a trial would be risky and costly. He faced being fined up to $100,000 and being sentenced to one year in prison if he was convicted. Furthermore, MacDougall was worried about going before the jury and lying to get himself acquitted. He thus changed his mind and agreed to cooperate fully with the FCC. At his first hearing on the afternoon of July 22, he pleaded guilty to the charge of "illegally operating a satellite uplink transmitter", a violation of 47 U.S.C. § 301. Under an agreement with Gentile, MacDougall plea bargained and received a $5,000 fine, was put on unsupervised probation for one year, and had his amateur radio license suspended for one year. Later, he was arraigned and freed on a $5,000 bond. MacDougall's plea bargain was confirmed at his sentencing by Judge Howard T. Snyder on August 26. Lawyers for Hughes Communications subsequently reviewed the option of taking MacDougall to civil court, but chose not to take any further action.

MacDougall was approached for interviews by major U.S. news stations after his arraignment, but Gentile advised him to not appear on television until his sentencing. MacDougall held a news conference in which he stated he did not contest the rights of cable companies to scramble their programs, but asked the government to allow the marketplace and not corporations to set prices. He revealed he was aware of a year-old magazine that spoke about the type of signal interference he caused, but affirmed the article was not influential on his actions.

== Reaction ==
MacDougall's jamming of HBO's satellite signal generated much publicity, and attracted attention from several sectors of society. The jamming was described by various press publications as either the first instance of high-technology terrorism, or the most widely watched instance of electronic graffiti in the world. The House Communications Subcommittee planned to hold meetings concerning the issue of satellite jamming. Members of Congress showed interest, with those coming from states with extensive rural areas showing more sympathy to owners of satellite dishes. The hijacking raised concerns over satellite-borne communications: that data transmitted by business and military users would become potential targets.

MacDougall's action led to him being immediately regarded as coming close to being a folk hero amongst disgruntled satellite dish owners who felt unfairly treated. The Satellite Television Industry Association released a statement denouncing intentional interference, and a spokesperson for the organization called for the offender to be imprisoned. Showtime vice president Stephen Schultz dubbed the intrusion as an act of "video terrorism". A correspondent for Television/Radio Age wrote the jamming was similar to the plot of the 1976 film Network, in which a disenchanted news anchor broadcasts his frustrations with the negative aspects of commercial television.

== Aftermath ==
As a consequence of MacDougall's jamming, and ambiguity about the federal misdemeanor charge made against him under 47 U.S.C. § 301, the U.S. Congress passed the Electronic Communications Privacy Act of 1986 (18 U.S.C. § 1367) which made satellite hijacking a felony. (Note: The penalty was raised to a fine of $250,000 and/or ten years imprisonment.) The FCC subsequently implemented strict requirements that all radio and television transmitters must have an electronic name tag for tracking purposes. The Automatic Transmitter Identification System (ATIS) was developed in response to MacDougall's actions, allowing satellite operators to quickly identify unauthorized uplink transmissions. In 2009, HBO and Elmer Musser were awarded a Technology & Engineering Emmy Award for ATIS. Although HBO has not been targeted since the channel's signal power was increased to make it more difficult for hijackers to intrude, there have been multiple instances of uplink video piracy across the United States. One such incident happened in November 1987, when Chicago stations WGN and WTTW had their transmissions briefly interrupted by a man in a Max Headroom mask. The jamming did not appear to affect HBO's pricing policies in the long-term.

Richard Acello, the editor of the home satellite dish magazine Satellite TV Week, stated MacDougall had not been able to achieve folk hero status as had been widely reported in the press:

"He didn't have any No. 1 records written about him or anything like that, and that's always an indication. The whole event was misunderstood. People took Captain Midnight to be a symbol of frustration people were feeling about scrambling. It made him seem a representative of dish owners, but he was not. There was no way a dish owner could do what he did."

The jamming was parodied in the cartoon strip Bloom County. A group called the Captain Midnight Grassroots Cause was formed and sold merchandise to help raise money for MacDougall to pay his legal fees. MacDougall found the constant media attention difficult to deal with, and was regularly bothered at home. He shut his office because no work could be undertaken without him being asked about Captain Midnight. As of 2011, he still resides in Ocala and undertakes consulting work under the MacDougall Electronics name. In a retrospective interview with Network World in 2011, MacDougall said he did not regret his actions but wished his motivations were more clearly understood:

I do not regret trying to get the message out to corporate America about unfair pricing and restrictive trade practices. That was the impetus for doing what I did; that's the reason I jammed HBO; that's the reason I sent them a polite message. What I do regret is that I was young and fairly naïve in the ways of the media. I didn't grasp the fact that no one understood my motives and that everyone would make assumptions. Had I known that up front I would have been much more fervent in explaining my motivations. I had no animus and I had no malice in my heart.

== See also ==
- Max Headroom signal hijackings
- Southern Television broadcast interruption
- Broadcast signal intrusion#Other incidents

== Bibliography ==
- DeFino, Dean J. (2014). The HBO Effect. New York City, New York: Bloomsbury Academic. ISBN 978-1-4411-8043-8.
- Gregg, Michael (2013). Certified Ethical Hacker (CEH) Cert Guide. London, England: Pearson IT Certification. ISBN 978-0-13-341302-1.
- Forester, Tom; Morrison, Perry (2007). "Hacking and Viruses". In Himma, Kenneth Einar (ed.). Internet Security: Hacking, Counterhacking, and Society. Sudbury, Mass.: Jones & Bartlett Publishers. ISBN 978-0-7637-3536-4.
- Leverette, Marc; Ott, Brian L.; Buckley, Cara Louise (2009). It's Not TV: Watching HBO in the Post-Television Era. Abingdon-on-Thames, England: Routledge. ISBN 978-1-135-90274-2.
- United Nations Institute for Disarmament Research (2006). Building the Architecture for Sustainable Space Security: Conference Report 30-31 March 2006. Geneva, Switzerland: United Nations Publications.
- Williams, Colin P. (2010). Explorations in Quantum Computing. Pasadena, California: Springer Science+Business Media. ISBN 978-1-84628-887-6.
- Wright, E. Lynne (2012). Myths and Mysteries of Florida: True Stories of the Unsolved and Unexplained. Lanham, Maryland: Rowman & Littlefield. ISBN 978-0-7627-9104-0.
