= Ilse Treurnicht =

South African-Canadian venture capitalist and innovation executive

- Born: South Africa
- Citizenship: Canadian
- Education: Stellenbosch University (BSc, MSc); University of Oxford (DPhil)
- Occupations: Venture capitalist, innovation executive
- Known for: CEO of MaRS Discovery District (2005–2017)
- Awards: Order of Ontario (2017)

Ilse Treurnicht is a South African-born Canadian venture capitalist, innovation executive, and policy adviser. She served as CEO of MaRS Discovery District in Toronto from 2005 to 2017, making her one of the longest-serving leaders of a major North American innovation hub. She was appointed to the Order of Ontario in 2017.

== Early life and education ==
Treurnicht was born in South Africa, where she was a middle-distance runner and anti-apartheid student activist. She earned a BSc and MSc in chemistry from Stellenbosch University. She attended the University of Oxford as a Rhodes Scholar, completing a DPhil in chemistry.

== Career ==
=== Venture capital ===
After a postdoctoral fellowship at the University of Western Ontario, Treurnicht held senior management roles in emerging technology companies, including work in green chemistry and medical device commercialization. From 1999 to 2005, she served as president and CEO of Primaxis Technology Ventures, a Toronto-based seed-stage venture capital fund, becoming one of Canada's first female venture capital fund CEOs.

=== MaRS Discovery District (2005–2017) ===
Treurnicht was named CEO of MaRS Discovery District in 2005, succeeding John Evans, as the innovation centre was preparing to open its first phase. During her 12-year tenure, MaRS grew to a 1,500,000-square-foot (140,000 m^{2}) campus housing approximately 6,000 people from 150 organizations across health, cleantech, fintech, and other sectors. Major tenants attracted during her leadership included Facebook Canada, Autodesk, and Johnson & Johnson.

Her tenure was marked by the West Tower Financial Crisis of 2013–2014. The Phase 2 tower, developed with Alexandria Real Estate Equities, had been unable to lease sufficient space to service its $224 million Infrastructure Ontario loan. The Government of Ontario ultimately committed $309 million in public funds. In a 2017 interview, Treurnicht described managing the crisis as the defining challenge of her tenure. By the time of her departure in June 2017, the tower was fully leased and MaRS had completed $290 million in private financing to repay the provincial loans ahead of schedule

Treurnicht's compensation as CEO drew public criticism. Her salary on Ontario's Sunshine list rose from $436,625 in 2009 to $532,500 by 2013, attracting scrutiny given MaRS's public funding. Treurnicht was succeeded as CEO by Yung Wu in 2017.

=== Post-MaRS career ===
After leaving MaRS, Treurnicht became a general partner at North South Ventures, a cross-border health impact venture fund, and executive chairperson of Triphase Accelerator Corporation, a cancer drug development company.

In July 2021, she co-founded TwinRiver Capital, a Toronto- and Boston-based impact investment firm, with Eric Wetlaufer and Adam Jagelewski.

== Honours and recognition ==
- Order of Ontario (2017)
- Honorary Doctor of Laws, University of Toronto (2018)
- Honorary Doctor of Laws, Ontario Tech University (2014)
- Named one of Toronto's 50 Most Influential, Toronto Life (2012)
