= Yung Wu =

Canadian technology entrepreneur and innovation executive

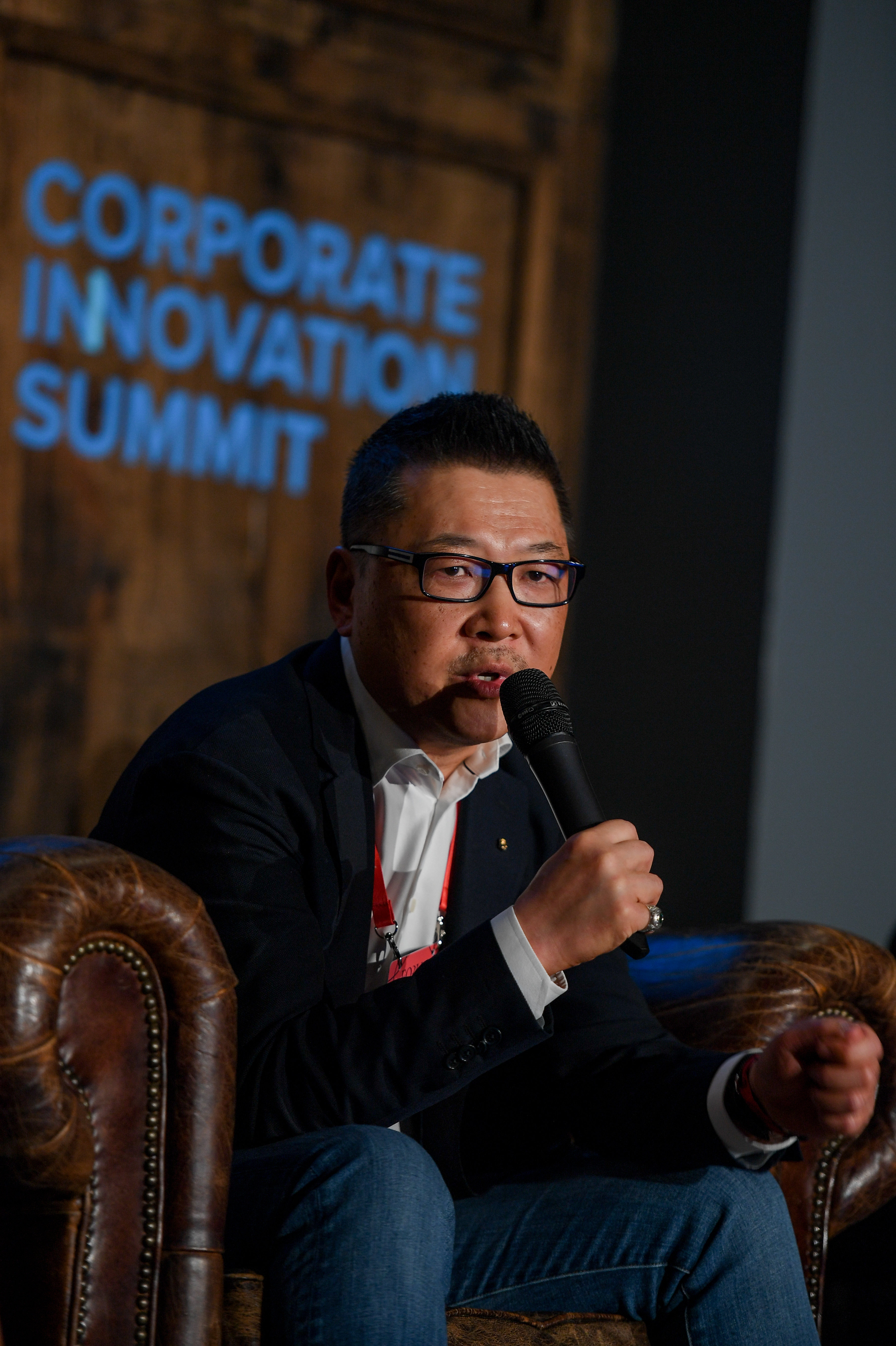
- Born: October 17, 1959 (age 66); Kaohsiung, Taiwan
- Citizenship: Canadian
- Education: University of Toronto (BSc); Kellogg-Schulich School of Business (MBA studies); Massachusetts Institute of Technology (EMP); Carnegie Mellon University (Cybersecurity Oversight)
- Occupations: Entrepreneur, investor, corporate director
- Known for: CEO of MaRS Discovery District (2017–2023); Co-founder of Castek Software; Chair of Toronto Region Board of Trade (2022–2025); Co-founder of CILAR
- Title: Chair, NFQ Ventures
- Board member of: OMERS Administration Corporation; MDA Space; Antibe Therapeutics
- Awards: King Charles III Coronation Medal (2025); Canada's Top 40 Under 40 (1995); NACD Directorship Certified (NACD.DC); ICD.D

Yung Wu is a Canadian technology entrepreneur, private equity investor, and corporate director. He founded Castek Software Factory, an insurance enterprise software company later acquired by Oracle in 2007, and served as CEO of MaRS Discovery District from 2017 to 2023. He has served as chair of the Toronto Region Board of Trade and as a director of OMERS Administration Corporation.

== Early life and education ==
Wu was born in Kaohsiung, Taiwan. His parents immigrated to Canada with their young children.

He holds a Bachelor of Science in computer science, economics and mathematics from the University of Toronto.

Wu attended the Kellogg-Schulich School of Business at York University for an MBA but left two credits short of completing the degree to found his first company. He later completed the Entrepreneurial Masters Program at the Massachusetts Institute of Technology and the NACD Cybersecurity Oversight program at Carnegie Mellon University.

He is a member of Mensa and the Young Presidents' Organization.

== Career ==
=== Castek Software (1990–2007) ===
In 1990, Wu founded Castek Software, a Toronto-based component software firm that developed into an enterprise insurance software company. The company's main product, Insure3, was a policy lifecycle administration platform used by insurers in North America, Europe, South Africa, South Korea, and China. The company was acquired by Oracle in 2007.

While leading Castek, Wu was named one of Canada's Top 40 Under 40 in 1995.

=== Investing and board roles ===
Wu is managing director and chair of NFQ Ventures, a Toronto-based private equity firm focused on early-stage investing. He served as chairman of Fuse Powered (formerly ByteMark Games), a mobile analytics and gaming company that was acquired by Upsight in January 2016.

Wu has served as a director of OMERS Administration Corporation since January 2018, sitting on its Investment Committee and Governance Committee. In February 2024, he was appointed to the board of directors of MDA Space, a dual-listed TSX and NYSE space technology company.

In 2025, Wu was named to Toronto mayor Olivia Chow's Economic Action Team, convened to advise on strategies to respond to U.S. tariff threats. In February 2026, he joined the advisory board of Massey Henry, an executive search firm.

=== MaRS Discovery District (2017–2023) ===
Wu was appointed CEO of MaRS Discovery District in October 2017, succeeding Ilse Treurnicht. He came out of semi-retirement for a five-year term, later extended by one year at the board's request.

According to MaRS reporting, during Wu's six-year tenure the MaRS-supported community grew from approximately 1,200 to over 1,400 companies, while the number of tech workers employed by those companies rose from roughly 6,000 to over 32,000. Over the same period, MaRS reported that its supported companies raised more than $20 billion in capital and contributed over $30 billion to Canada's GDP.

Wu launched Mission from MaRS, a climate-focused initiative to accelerate adoption of carbon-reducing technologies. Its first cohort of ten "Climate Champions", announced in 2021, included companies such as CarbonCure Technologies and Carbon Engineering.

During Wu's tenure, MaRS helped establish Graphite Ventures, a private-sector venture capital fund that evolved from the MaRS Investment Accelerator Fund (IAF). The IAF had deployed $65 million in seed-stage financing into over 100 startups. Graphite Ventures launched in January 2022 with a first close of $77 million and announced a $110 million final close for its Fund IV in August 2023.

Wu also oversaw MaRS' expansion to the Waterfront Innovation Centre on Toronto's Queens Quay East, developed in partnership with Menkes Developments and the University of Toronto.

In 2020, Wu launched Momentum, a scale-up program for high-growth Canadian companies with the potential to reach $100 million in revenue within five years. The program was developed using part of a $17.5 million allocation MaRS received from FedDev Ontario through the federal Scale-Up Platform initiative; its inaugural cohort included 53 companies with a combined $905 million in revenue.

Several companies supported by MaRS during Wu's tenure reached significant scale, including StackAdapt, League, ecobee, CarbonCure Technologies, and Carbon Engineering, which was acquired by Occidental Petroleum for $1.1 billion in 2023.

In April 2020, during the COVID-19 pandemic in Canada, Wu publicly urged the federal government to act within "days, not weeks and months" to support the innovation sector, calling for blanket acceptance of startups into the Canada Emergency Wage Subsidy. During the pandemic, MaRS reported maintaining a vacancy rate below 2 percent across its 1.5 million square feet of space in downtown Toronto at a time when the broader Toronto office vacancy rate exceeded 15 percent.

In June 2024, The Globe and Mail reported on changes in MaRS' finances and staff levels, noting that Wu's compensation had increased to $650,625 during his tenure. The newspaper subsequently published corrections clarifying that $14.1 million of the reported revenue decline was attributable to the termination of flow-through payments to third parties that MaRS had administered on behalf of the provincial government, and that Wu's fiscal 2023 compensation included a prepaid $157,500 bonus for fiscal 2024; without that bonus, his pay for fiscal 2023 would have been $525,000, representing an annualized growth rate of 1.7 percent over six years. Wu was succeeded as CEO by Alison Nankivell.

=== Toronto Region Board of Trade ===
Wu joined the board of the Toronto Region Board of Trade in 2019, served as vice-chair in 2021, and was elected chair of the board of directors in January 2022.

== Public service and advocacy ==
In February 2021, Wu was appointed by Governor-in-Council to Canada's Net-Zero Advisory Body, an independent body advising the federal government on achieving net-zero emissions by 2050. He served until 2023.

In June 2020, Wu co-founded the Coalition of Innovation Leaders Advancing Respect (CILAR), alongside Armughan Ahmad and Claudette McGowan, to address systemic racism in the Canadian technology sector. The coalition launched with 25 founding members from organizations including KPMG, OMERS, Cisco Canada, Meta, Salesforce, JP Morgan, Deloitte, TMU, and Google.

Wu and his wife Katrina co-founded DifferentIsCool (DiSC), a non-profit advocacy organization for inclusion, inspired by Wu's adult brother who has autism.

== Honours ==
- King Charles III Coronation Medal (2025)
- Canada's Top 40 Under 40 (1995)

Ribbon	Description	Notes
	King Charles III Coronation Medal	Decoration awarded in 2025; Canadian version
