= Canine Intervention =

American television show

Canine Intervention (Canine Academy) is an American Netflix original TV show/reality show of 6 episodes of about 35 minutes each. Originally a web-series, the premiere on Netflix occurred on February 24, 2021. The show takes place in Oakland, California. It deals with dog training, through the main protagonist, Jasalah Leverette and his dog training facility, Cali K9 in San Jose. Each episode displays Leverette coping with specific cases. The show is directed by Elise Duran and produced by the A.Smith & co-Productions company.

The show promotes dog training in the way that it represents both a necessity and a last chance for the dogs considered dangerous. The goal of the series is to demonstrate various and easy way to fix the obedience and reactivity of a dog, including the most extreme behavior issues. Canine intervention, does not only focus on the dog behavioral changes, but also on the owners, that need to be informed. Owning a dog requires more than it is commonly thought, and the show is also a useful tool for households unable to buy the service of a dog trainer, to acquire some knowledge about the techniques applied to train the animal.

== Synopsis per episodes ==
Episode 1: Leverette assists Lady Macbeth, a two-year-old pit bull and her owner Brendan, to manage the dog's aggressive behavior. The female pit bull used to live on the street and lost one leg after getting shot, because of her defensive behaviors. The experienced dog trainer will then initiate a training process to ensure the safety and tranquility of the dog in the face of any danger. The involvement of the Cali K9 team represents the animal's last chance before euthanasia.

Episode 2: Jasalah Leverette and his team help a couple deal with their young German Shepherd, Diesel. The animal lacks training, and its large size makes the task more complicated for its owners. The dog trainer, will start from the beginning with Diesel to make him a more obedient dog.

Episode 3: The third episode of the show focuses on Nino, owned by boxer Andre Berto. Berto makes a call on his friend, Leverette to test on the skills of his protection dog, which had been previously trained by Leverette himself. A protection dog has to be constantly coached to keep sharp obedience and limits.

Episode 4: Heaven, a young Maltipoo, is an emotional support dog for owner Andrew. However, the family is having hard time imposing limitations on the animal. The Cali K9 team will intervene with the family, and teach them the dangers of humanizing a dog too much, which then loses its bearings and attempts to enforce its own rules on the household.

Episode 5: Blue, a dominant pit bull puppy, is making it hard time for owners Ray and Johnnetta, to contain his temper. The task for Leverette is time consuming but not complicated, taking up all the basics of education of Blue. The dog was prematurely separated from his mother, and has behavioral issues as a result.

Episode 6: Leverette make a visit to Jeannette's rescue camp in the Mojave Desert to show the impact of dog training on dogs. The dog trainer will support Jeannette in her actions by training the rescue dog, giving them a better chance to be adopted.

== Reception ==
=== Critical reception ===
The show's first season received a mostly positive critical response. Ashley Lee, in a review for the Los Angeles Times, called it "easy to watch and emotionally satisfying." Joel Keller, writing for Decider, gave it a positive review and described it as "a feel-good show." Melissa Camacho of Common Sense Media wrote that "Not everyone will agree with Leverette's techniques, but there's no doubt that Canine Intervention will catch the attention of many dog lovers."

=== Reaction from the dog training community ===
The series received criticism from some dog trainers and owners, who felt that Leverette's techniques were dangerous or harmful to animals. A Change.org petition to cancel the series before its release had 34,000 signatures. It continued to receive criticism for Leverette's use of a balanced training regime and respecting the dogs natural way of learning which he proves gets the best results with some of the most challenging dog's.
