= Automatic Transmitter Identification System (television) =

Satellite TV station identification protocol

The Automatic Transmitter Identification System (ATIS) is a communications protocol used for the station identification of television channels carried on satellite television.

ATIS is only required for analog television transmission and only via satellites or earth stations under United States jurisdiction. It is continuously repeated whilst an earth station is using a transponder on a satellite. The Federal Communications Commission (FCC) rules for ATIS are set forth in 47 CFR §25.281.

The system was developed in response to the "Captain Midnight" satellite jamming incident. In 2009, HBO and Elmer Musser were awarded a Technology & Engineering Emmy Award for ATIS.

ATIS is a Morse code transmission sent on a subcarrier of 7.1 MHz and must activate automatically any time the station is transmitting. The center frequency must be no more than 25 kHz from this nominal value and the frequency deviation must be no more than 25 kHz peak when being modulated. Injection must be at a minimum of −26dB referenced to the unmodulated carrier. The tone used to modulate the subcarrier is nominally 1,200 Hz, but may vary by as much as 800 Hz (400 to 2,000 Hz).

The ATIS message is sent at a transmission rate of 15 to 25 words per minute and must not exceed 30 seconds in its entire length. The message includes the FCC-assigned callsign of the earth station, its telephone number, a ten-digit serial number, and sometimes other information which is voluntary. The telephone number must immediately connect to personnel who can resolve radio interference and other frequency coordination issues. The serial number cannot be easily changed.

ATIS encoders must be included in the uplink airchain of all transmitters as of March 1, 1991 "in a method that cannot easily be defeated".

Other subcarriers piggybacked on the video carrier are also included in transmissions, often at 6.2 MHz and 6.8 MHz, just above the bandpass of the video signal (even if scrambled). These carry left and right stereo audio and second audio program, and sometimes radio stations or radio networks which may be unrelated to the television network. Backhauls are too intermittent for such uses but may carry in-house private audio channels instead. Because all of these, including ATIS, are all audio, they can all be tuned by an analog TVRO receiver. However, digital television has overtaken analog because multiple channels can be transmitted on one transponder. These signals carry their station ID as data instead.
