= Second audio program =

Alternate audio channel used in television transmissions

Second audio program (SAP), also known as secondary audio programming, is an auxiliary audio channel for analog television that can be broadcast or transmitted both over-the-air and by cable television. Used mostly for audio description or other languages, SAP is part of the multichannel television sound (MTS) standard originally set by the National Television System Committee (NTSC) in 1984 in the United States. The NTSC video format and MTS are also used in Canada and Mexico.

== Usage ==
SAP is often used to provide audio tracks in languages other than the native language included in the program. In the United States, this is sometimes used for Spanish-language audio (especially during sports telecasts), often leading to the function being referred to facetiously as the "Spanish audio program". Likewise, some Spanish-language programs may offer English on SAP, seen with soccer networks including beIN Sports (which features the same setup on its English and Spanish channels, and more rarely with general channels. Some stations may relay NOAA Weather Radio services, or, particularly in the case of PBS stations, a local National Public Radio (NPR) sister station, on the audio channel when SAP is not being used, and even commercial radio stations which are either sister operations or broker their programming onto the SAP channel. In Canada, parliamentary and public affairs channel CPAC similarly uses SAP to carry both English and French-language audio.

SAP is also a means of distribution for audio description of programs for the visually impaired. Under the Twenty-First Century Communications and Video Accessibility Act of 2010, top U.S. television networks and cable networks have been gradually required to broadcast quotas of audio described programming per-quarter, Since May 26, 2015, broadcasters have been required under the Act to provide dictations on SAP of any "emergency information" displayed in a textual format outside of the Emergency Alert System and newscasts.

== Frequencies ==
MTS features, including stereo and SAP, travel on subcarriers of the video carrier, much like color for television. It is not carried on the audio carrier in the manner of stereo sound for an FM radio broadcast, however, as it only has a frequency deviation of ±25 kHz, whereas regular FM broadcasting has a deviation of ±75 kHz. T MTS pilot is locked to the horizontal sync frequency of the video carrier for stability. The SAP channel contains mono audio which has been dbx-encoded for noise reduction, to improve the signal-to-noise ratio. The SAP audio has a bandpass from 60 Hz to 12 kHz, which is less than the "regular" audio channel which runs from 50 Hz to 15 kHz.

Though not technically an SAP channel, television stations can also broadcast a "PRO" (professional) audio subcarrier which is used to communicate with station personnel, particularly those engaged in electronic news gathering. This one-way audio channel allows individuals at the television station to send messages to people located away from the station, and is frequently employed during on-location newscasts as the foldback channel to reporters and cameramen. This channel is located at 6.5 times the pilot (102.271 kHz), and is also part of the MTS standard.

== Other media ==
Second audio programs are also available in other media. On analog television receive-only satellite television systems, audio programs are manually tuned by their subcarrier frequency, commonly around 6 MHz, often as low as 5.8 or as high as 7.2. These travel the same way as the discrete left and right main audio channels, and ATIS station ID, which is heard as Morse code. On FM radio, radio reading services and other audio programs can be heard on subcarriers through subsidiary communications authority. However, these are generally prohibited from public listening without special equipment. HD Radio subchannels, somewhat more widely available, operate on a similar premise but generally carry totally unrelated programming to the main feed.

On digital television systems, selection is done through a menu as with analog television, though some provide easier access rather than having to dig down to find the option. Stations may also choose to transmit audio-only programs by assigning them to separate digital subchannels with an optional screen of title and artist information; however, this prevents the viewer from watching the main video in the case of television stations.
