= Artscape =

Artscape may refer to:

- Artscape (festival), an annual art festival in Baltimore, Maryland, US
- Artscape (organisation), a Swedish nonprofit arts organisation
- Artscape Nordland, an international art project in Norway
- Artscape Theatre Centre in Cape Town, South Africa
- Artscape, a 2011 Australian program broadcast by ABC Television
