= Hippo (company) =

American property insurance company

Hippo Holdings Inc.
- Company type: Public
- Traded as: NYSE: HIPO
- Industry: Insurance
- Founded: January 10, 2015; 11 years ago
- Founders: Assaf Wand; Eyal Navon
- Headquarters: San Jose, California, United States
- Area served: United States
- Revenue: ▲US$210 million (2023)
- Number of employees: 516 (2023)
- Website: hippo.com

Hippo Holdings Inc. is an American property insurance company Broker based in San Jose, California. Hippo offers homeowner's insurance that covers the homes and possessions of the insurance holder as well as liability from accidents happening in the insured property. They use AI and big data to aggregate and analyze property information.

The company sells insurance policies directly to customers and through independent insurance brokers.

== History ==
Hippo was founded by Assaf Wand, a former Intel Capital investor and McKinsey consultant, and Eyal Navon, an entrepreneur with a background in software engineering and R&D. A serial entrepreneur who had previously founded several companies, Wand's interest in insurance was inspired by his father's lengthy career in the "antiquated" insurance industry. It was founded in 2015, shortly after Wand's third start-up, Sabi, was acquired.

In December 2016, to fund product development, Hippo raised $14m in a series A round of venture capital financing, and in April 2017 Hippo launched in California. At launch, the company's marketing was centered on the delivery of a 60-second quote for homeowners insurance policies; a transparent, online purchase process; and smart home sensors that could proactively identify and prevent potential damage to policyholder's homes. In November 2018, Hippo raised $25 million in series B financing, led by Comcast Ventures and Fifth Wall Ventures. The funding was used, in part, to open a customer service and insurance operations center in Austin, Texas. A $70 million funding round was announced in November 2018, and in March 2019, with Hippo insurance available to more than 50% of the homeowners in the United States, the company reported a 25 percent month-over-month sales growth and total insured property value of more than $50 billion. In July, $100 million was raised in new venture capital, led by Mary Meeker's Bond Capital, bringing Hippo's valuation to $1 billion.

Also in November 2018, Hippo raised $70 million in series C financing, led by Felicis Ventures and Lennar. In July 2019, Hippo raised $100 million in series D funding, led by Bond Capital. In July 2020, Hippo raised $150 million in series E funding. In November 2020, Hippo raised $350 million from an investment by Mitsui Sumitomo Insurance Company, a subsidiary of MS&AD Insurance Group.

Hippo acquired Sheltr, a San Francisco-based tech-enabled services startup designed to provide home wellness checkups, in November 2019.

Hippo went public and was listed on the New York Stock Exchange through Reinvent Technology Partners, its special-purpose acquisition company, in August 2021.

In June 2022, Wand was appointed executive chairperson of Hippo. As of mid October 2022, the value of a share purchased at the IPO had fallen by more than 95%. Insurance veteran Richard McCathron was elevated to CEO.
