= Heirloom Carbon Technologies =

Heirloom Carbon Technologies is an American climate technology company that develops direct air capture technology for removing carbon dioxide from the atmosphere. The company uses a limestone-based process for carbon removal. In 2023, it opened air capture facility in Tracy, California, designed to capture 1,000 metric tons of carbon dioxide per year.

== History ==
Heirloom Carbon Technologies was founded in 2020 by Shashank Samala and Noah McQueen.

The company developed a direct air capture process using limestone. In the process, treated limestone absorbs carbon dioxide from the air. The carbon dioxide is later separated from the material, and the remaining calcium-based material can be reused in the capture cycle.

In February 2023, Heirloom Carbon Technologies and CarbonCure used carbon dioxide captured from the air in a concrete storage demonstration in San Jose, California. The carbon dioxide was transported from Heirloom's facility and injected into concrete through CarbonCure's process.

In September 2023, Microsoft agreed to purchase carbon removal credits from Heirloom for the removal of up to 315,000 metric tons of carbon dioxide.

In November 2023, Heirloom opened a commercial direct air capture facility in Tracy, California. The facility was designed to capture 1,000 metric tons of carbon dioxide per year.

The Tracy facility uses trays containing treated limestone to absorb carbon dioxide from the air. After absorption, the material is heated to release the carbon dioxide, and the material is then reused.

The carbon dioxide captured at the Tracy facility is stored in concrete through Heirloom's work with CarbonCure.

By 2025, Heirloom Carbon Technologies was involved in Project Cypress, a direct air capture hub in Louisiana with Battelle and Climeworks. The project was part of the U.S. Department of Energy's direct air capture hub program.

== Technology ==
Heirloom's direct air capture system uses limestone as the capture material. Limestone naturally absorbs carbon dioxide, and the company's process is designed to accelerate that absorption cycle.

The process involves exposing treated limestone to air, separating the captured carbon dioxide through heat, and reusing the material for additional capture cycles.

== Facilities and projects ==
Heirloom's Tracy, California facility has an annual capture capacity of 1,000 metric tons of carbon dioxide.

Project Cypress is a Louisiana direct air capture hub involving Battelle, Climeworks, and Heirloom Carbon Technologies. The project was included among U.S. Department of Energy-backed direct air capture hub projects.
