= Alison Nankivell =

Canadian financial executive and trade policy leader

- Citizenship: Canadian
- Education: University of Toronto (BA); London School of Economics (MPA)
- Occupations: Financial executive, trade policy leader
- Known for: President and CEO of Export Development Canada

Alison Nankivell is a Canadian financial executive and trade policy leader. She is the president and CEO of Export Development Canada (EDC), a federal Crown corporation that facilitated $123 billion in Canadian exports in 2024. Before EDC, she held senior roles at BDC Capital, the Institutional Limited Partners Association (ILPA), and served briefly as CEO of MaRS Discovery District. She survived the 2008 terrorist attacks on the Oberoi Trident Hotel in Mumbai.

== Early life and education ==
Nankivell earned a BA (Honours) in commerce and economics from the University of Toronto and a Master in Public Administration and Public Policy from the London School of Economics. She holds the CFA designation. She is fluent in Mandarin.

== Career ==
=== Economist Intelligence Unit and China ===
Nankivell began her career in the early 1990s as a China economic analyst and editor at the Economist Intelligence Unit in Beijing and Hong Kong. She subsequently worked as an independent economist consulting for the International Labour Organization, United Nations Development Programme, and the Canadian International Development Agency.

=== Export Development Canada (first stint) ===
Nankivell spent approximately 14 years at Export Development Canada across two periods, including seven years in Beijing postings as chief representative for Greater China, and as principal and head of Asia fund investments.

=== Ontario Teachers' Pension Plan ===
She served as director of Funds Asia at Teachers' Private Capital, the private equity arm of the Ontario Teachers' Pension Plan.

=== BDC Capital ===
Nankivell spent approximately a decade at BDC Capital, rising to senior vice-president of fund investments and global scaling, where she oversaw a $5 billion asset portfolio. During her tenure, she led the Indigenous Growth Fund initiative and drove ESG integration across BDC's investment activities.

She was elected to the board of the Institutional Limited Partners Association (ILPA), a global industry body for institutional investors, serving as treasurer and then as board chair from 2021 to 2023.

=== MaRS Discovery District (2024) ===
In March 2024, Nankivell was appointed CEO of MaRS Discovery District replacing Yung Wu. She undertook a significant restructuring, cutting approximately 20 positions in June 2024 and a further 19 later that year, reducing total headcount to approximately 101 employees. The restructuring followed a period in which MaRS's net revenues had fallen 15% from pre-pandemic levels.

Nankivell departed MaRS after nine months to accept the position of president and CEO of Export Development Canada.

=== Export Development Canada (2025–present) ===
In December 2024, the federal government announced Nankivell's appointment as president and CEO of Export Development Canada, effective February 2025.
