= Turntide Technologies =

- Trade name: Turntide Inc
- Company type: Private
- Industry: Electrification
- Founded: 2020
- Headquarters: Gateshead UK
- Website: Turntide.com

Turntide Technologies (Turntide) is an UK start-up manufacturing electric motors, power electronics, battery systems, and thermal equipment.

== History ==
Turntide was founded in 2013 as Software Motor Corporation (shortened to "SMC"), then changed its name to Software Motor Company in 2018. In July 2020, SMC rebranded to Turntide Technologies.

Turntide entered the agriculture space in 2018 by partnering with VES, a dairy technology supplier, to launch DairyBOS, the Dairy Barn Operating System. Turntide acquired VES fully in October 2020. The company acquired and merged VES with Canadian agricultural tech company Artex Barn Solutions to expand its offering into intelligent barn systems.

Turntide won a 2020 Gold Edison Award and 2020 Product of the Year from Environmental and Energy Leader. In 2021, Fast Company named Turntide one the World's Most Innovative Companies in the Energy category.

CEO Ryan Morris told CNN in April 2021 that the company would "soon announce a push into electric vehicles (EVs)." In June 2021, Turntide announced that it had entered the EV space, with the acquisition of the Gateshead drivetrain division of BorgWarner and the battery company Hyperdrive, as well as the EV controls company AVID Technology.

Southern California Edison utility certified in 2018 that the V01 Smart Motor System reduced energy consumption by 23%-57% compared with a standard AC induction motor, and 11% compared with an induction motor controlled by a variable frequency drive. In 2019, National Renewable Energy Laboratory certified that Turntide's motor reduced energy consumption in refrigerator condenser fans by 29%-71%.

== Fundraising ==
In 2016, SMC received a seed investment from National Science Foundation Small Business Innovation Research program, and a second investment in 2017. Also in 2017, Turntide received investment from Wells Fargo's Innovation Incubator.

In September 2020, Amazon awarded Turntide an investment as part of its first round of five Climate Pledge Fund investments. At that time, Turntide also announced investment from Future Shape, the fund led by Nest founder Tony Fadell. Then in March 2021, Turntide announced it had raised funds from Bill Gates' Breakthrough Energy Ventures, Robert Downey Jr.'s climate fund FootPrint Coalition, Fifth Wall Capital, and Keyframe Capital. It also announced that it had acquired building automation company Riptide.

In June 2021, Turntide announced it had raised another $225 million, including from Canada Pension Plan Investment Board.
