= Leverette =

Leverette can be both a given name and a surname. Notable people with the surname include:

- Leverette D. House, American politician, representative of California's 76th State Assembly district from 1957 to 1963
- Bernard Leverette (fl. 2002–2012), member of American hip-hop group Dem Franchise Boyz
- Horace Leverette (1889–1958), American baseball pitcher
- Marc Leverette, American artist
- Otis Leverette (born 1978), American former American football defensive end
- William L. Leverette (1913–2003), United States Air Force colonel
