= ZeroAvia =

British-American hydrogen-electric aircraft company

- Industry: Aerospace
- Founded: 2017
- Founder: Valery Miftakhov
- Headquarters: United States
- Key people: CEO:
- Products: Light aircraft; Rotorcraft; Regional airliner
- Website: www.zeroavia.com

ZeroAvia is a British/American hydrogen-electric aircraft developer. The company was founded in 2017 by Valery Miftakhov, who served as the company CEO until May 26 2026. ZeroAvia is developing hydrogen-fueled powertrain technology aiming to compete with conventional engines in propeller aircraft, with an aim of zero-emission and lower noise. ZeroAvia expects to sell products by 2023 and demonstrate flights up to 500 miles (800 km) in aircraft of up to 20 seats. According to the company, by 2026, ZeroAvia intends to fly an aircraft over 500 miles range in aircraft with up to 80 seats.

== History ==
=== Piper PA-46 ===
In 2019, the company completed flight tests of the electrical aspects of the initial powertrain design, where it was later reported that an external hydrogen tank was fitted to a Piper Matrix.

The company moved to a facility in Cranfield, England in 2020. Installation and test of the ZA250 hydrogen–electric powertrain in a six-seat Piper Malibu took place at Cranfield during 2020, culminating in an eight-minute first flight of the hydrogen-electric Malibu in September that year. It was the company's first commercial-scale hydrogen-electric-powered flight. In December 2020, the company was awarded £12.3 million, from the UK Government's ATI Programme, to develop a 19-seat hydrogen powered aircraft with a 350-mile (560 km) flight to be completed by 2023.

In March 2021, ZeroAvia launched development for a 2 MW hydrogen-electric powertrain for full-size regional aircraft. The following month, the company announced it would develop the HyFlyer II aircraft at Cotswold Airport. On 29 April 2021, ZeroAvia's hydrogen-powered Piper PA-46-350P demonstrator testbed crashed in a field during a flight from Cranfield. No one was seriously hurt in the accident, but the aircraft received substantial damage, losing its left wing, after it was forced to land following a power system test. Investigation revealed that when the battery was disconnected to test operation on the fuel cell alone, excessive voltage generated by the motor turned by the propeller caused a protective shutdown of the motor's inverter.

=== Dornier 228 ===
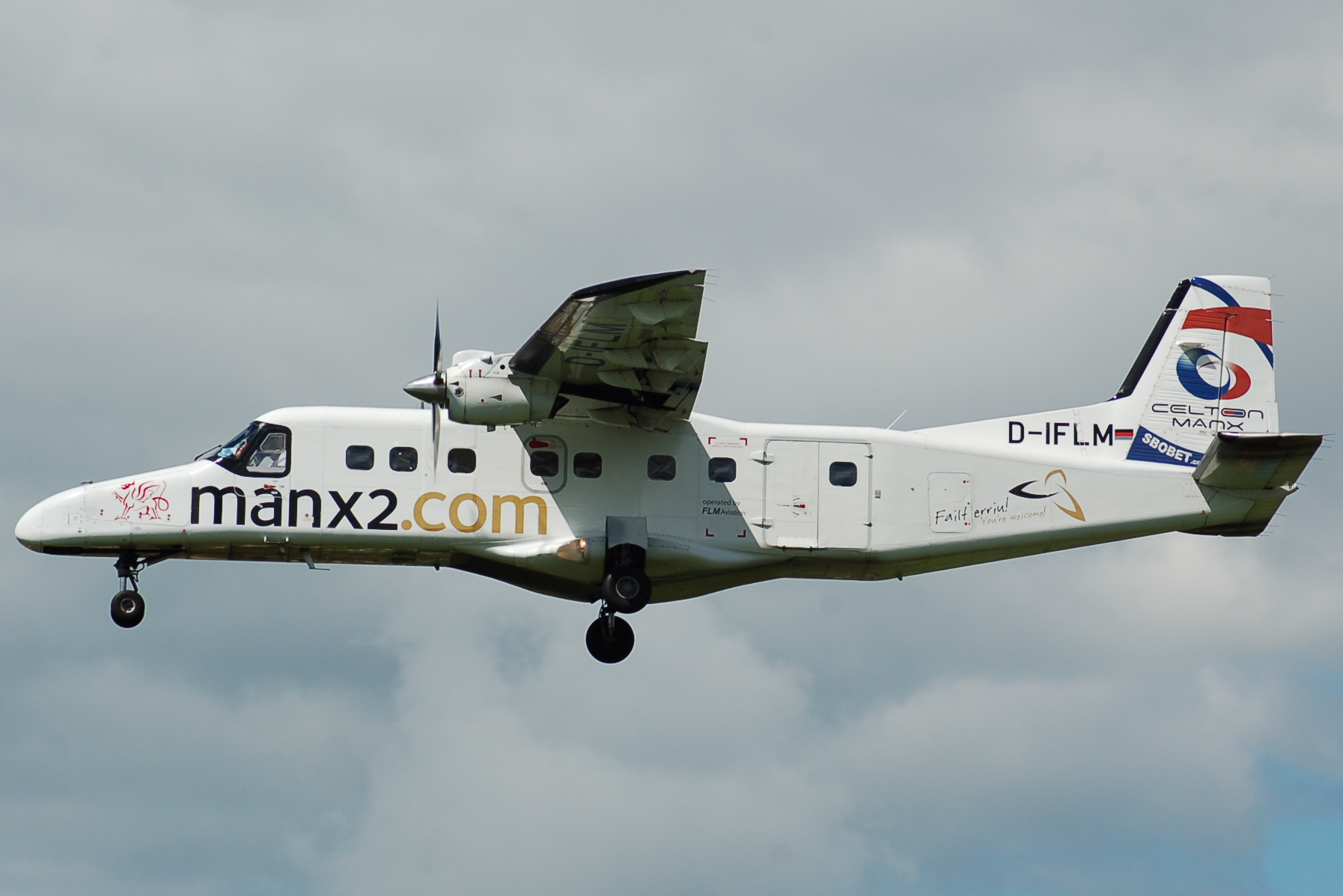
The Dornier 228 used by ZeroAvia before its modification

ZeroAvia obtained two Dornier 228 aircraft for the next phase of its 19-seat HyFlyer program in June 2021. In August 2021, ZeroAvia completed its first high-power run of the ZA-600, a hydrogen aircraft engine. Ground testing included a flight-intent 600 kW (800 hp) powertrain, which pulled a 15-ton HyperTruck mobile ground testing platform across the tarmac. The HyperTruck tests systems for 40-80 seat hydrogen-electric powered aircraft and is sized to ZeroAvia’s ZA-2000 2 MW (2,700 hp)+ powertrain. These propulsion system tests are for the HyFlyer II programme, which hopes to develop a hydrogen-electric, zero-emission propulsion system for airframes 10–20 seats in size. Later in 2021, the first HyFlyer II’s Dornier 228 aircraft test-flights were anticipated to take place at the Kemble facility.

In 2022, the company announced a partnership with Otto Aviation to build a hydrogen-powered version of the Otto Celera 500L aircraft. That same year, Textron Aviation and ZeroAvia partnered for the development of a hydrogen-electric powertrain for the Cessna Grand Caravan.

On 19 January 2023, ZeroAvia flew its Dornier 228 testbed for 10 minutes with one TPE331 turboprop replaced by a prototype hydrogen-electric powertrain in the cabin, consisting of two fuel cells and a lithium-ion battery for peak power. The aim is to have a certifiable configuration by 2025.

The test campaign is planned for 10 to 20 flights. The commercial platform is intended to be a 10- to 20-seat aircraft.

=== DHC-8 ===
In October 2021, ZeroAvia announced a collaboration with Alaska Airlines to develop the ZA-2000 hydrogen-electric powertrain, capable of producing between 2,000 kW and 5,000 kW, to power 76-seat regional aircraft with a range of at least 500 nmi (930 km; 580 mi).

In December 2021, ZeroAvia entered into a partnership with De Havilland Canada with a view to offering the ZA-2000 powertrain as an option for the DHC-8 airliner, as a line-fit option for new aircraft and as an approved retrofit for existing aircraft.

In May 2023, ZeroAvia unveiled a DHC-8 Q400 donated by Alaska Airlines for use as a testbed aircraft.

== Operations ==
=== Finances ===
==== 2020 ====
Announced 16 December 2020, ZeroAvia raised $21.4 million in Series A financing led by the Bill Gates-backed power investing fund, Breakthrough Energy Ventures and environmental sustainability VC firm Ecosystem Integrity Fund. Existing investors Sweden's Summa Equity, the venture investing arm of Royal Dutch Shell, private individual Ihar Mahaniok, Hong Kong fund Horizons Ventures, and Amazon's Climate Pledge Fund also participated. At the same time, the firm also received a grant from London-based the Aerospace Technology Institute, Innovate UK, and the UK's Department for Business, Energy & Industrial Strategy, totalling $16.3 million.

==== 2021 ====
Announced on 31 March 2021, ZeroAvia raised $24.3 million in a second round of Series A financing. This round was led by existing investor Horizons Ventures and included previous investors Breakthrough Energy Ventures, Royal Dutch Shell, Summa Equity, and SYSTEMIQ, alongside new investor British Airways.

Announced on 29 June 2021, ZeroAvia raised $13 million from six existing investors–Breakthrough, Climate Pledge Fund, Horizons, Shell, Summa, and SYSTEMIQ–with four new investors coming on board, including SGH Capital, AP Ventures, Alumni Ventures, and Agartha Fund LP.

Announced on 13 December 2021, ZeroAvia raised $35 million in Series B financing that brought in new investors United Airlines Ventures and the Alaska Air Group, alongside previous investors AP Ventures, Horizons Ventures, Royal Dutch Shell, Breakthrough Energy Ventures, Summa Equity, and Amazon's Climate Pledge Fund.

==== 2023 ====
In September 2023, ZeroAvia announced a new financing round, with Airbus as a lead investor. Airbus will also collaborate with ZeroAvia on approaches to certification and technical aspects such as fuelling operations and fuel-cell testing. Other investors in this round include Neom Investment Fund, Barclays Sustainable Impact Capital, Alaska Airlines, Horizons Ventures, Breakthrough Energy Ventures, and Ecosystem Integrity Fund.

The company signed a memorandum of understanding with Verne to evaluate cryo-compressed hydrogen (CcH_{2}) for use in its planes. Cryo-compressed hydrogen stores gaseous hydrogen at cold temperatures, achieving energy density 40% higher than liquid hydrogen and 200% percent more than (350 bar) gaseous hydrogen. Verne claimed that CcH_{2} can significantly lower densification costs and refueling times versus liquid hydrogen, while increasing storage duration and potentially eliminating pressure management (venting).
