= Climate Pledge Fund =

Amazon's climate technology venture capital fund

- Type: Public
- Industry: Venture Capital
- Founded: 2020
- Founder: Amazon
- Headquarters: Seattle, Washington, U.S.
- Products: Corporate venture capital
- Total assets: $2 billion
- Number of employees: 10+

The Climate Pledge Fund is a division of Amazon, set up to develop and manage investments in the climate technology space, as part of its Climate Pledge initiative. It is a corporate venture capital fund.

== History ==
The Climate Pledge Fund was founded in June 2020 to make investments into early-stage companies focused on decarbonizing or sustainable technologies and services. As of December 2021, Matt Peterson, director, corporate new initiatives, and Kara Hurst, vice president and head of sustainability, lead the fund.

Amazon used the fund as the naming rights sponsor of Climate Pledge Arena, a sports and entertainment venue in Seattle that opened in 2021. The venue was designed with environmentally-friendly features and aimed to have net-zero emissions.

== Notable investments ==
- BETA Technologies - Electric vertical aircraft manufacturer
- CarbonCure Technologies - Lower carbon concrete manufacturer
- Redwood Materials - process & technologies for recycling lithium-ion batteries and producing battery materials from recovered elements
- Rivian - electric vehicle automaker
- Turntide Technologies - optimal efficiency motor technologies for building controls (e.g. ventilation, lighting)
- ZeroAvia - share-haul hydrogen-electric aircraft

== See also ==
- Microsoft's Climate Innovation Fund
- Breakthrough Energy Ventures
- Elemental Excelerator's Earthshot Ventures Fund
- VertueLab's Climate Impact Fund
- Decarbon8-US
