= Madison Reed =

American brand of natural hair care and hair color products

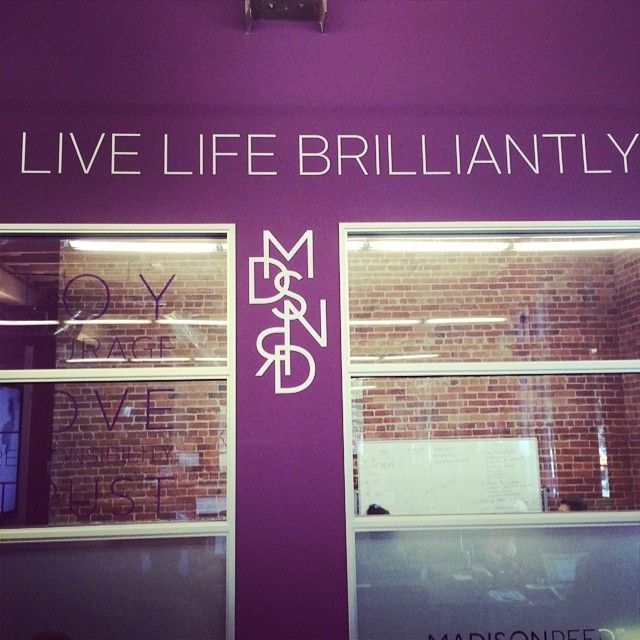
- Type: Private
- Headquarters: San Francisco, California, United States
- Key people: Amy Errett (CEO)
- Products: Hair care Hair color
- Website: www.madison-reed.com

Madison Reed is an American brand of hair care and hair color products. The company has a subscription-based service through its online and brick-and-mortar stores as well as retail partnerships with Ulta Beauty, Walmart, Sally Beauty, and Amazon.com. The company also operates brick-and-mortar "Hair Color Bars" in cities across the United States. A class action suit with allegations that included hair damage, hair loss, false advertising, and use of known carcinogen ethanolamine presented as a "natural" alternative to the ammonia typically found in hair dye was filed against the company in 2022 and was settled out of court in 2024.

== Background ==
Madison Reed was founded in 2013 by Amy Errett. In 2017, Madison Reed opened brick-and-mortar "Hair Color Bars" in San Francisco and New York City for root touch-ups and glosses. By 2020, demand for at-home hair color increased significantly during the COVID-19 pandemic, contributing to revenue growth.

Since its founding, Madison Reed has received industry recognition. In 2021, it was named to Fast Company’s list of "Ten Most Innovative Beauty Companies," and in 2022 it appeared on Newsweek’s "Most Loved Workplaces”.

There is significant controversy surrounding Madison Reed and the safety of its products. Complaints included false advertising claiming the product was free of harsh chemicals because it does not use ammonia, while failing to disclose the replacement for ammonia is ethanolamine, a product more damaging to hair than ammonia known to cause hair loss, as well as a known carcinogen. The case was dropped by the plaintiff and settled out of court in 2024.

Despite direct complaints from consumers and a class action lawsuit, Madison Reed continues to claim their products do not contain the “usual harsh ingredients” generally found in hair color products, and instead maintain that they are “packed with all of the things healthy hair loves."

== Product Offerings ==
The company was formed with the intention of offering salon-quality hair color that can be used at home, and later offered the option for color to be applied by a colorist at the company’s “Hair Color Bars.” Their product portfolio includes permanent hair color, demi-permanent hair color, and temporary root coverage solutions.

Their formulas are cruelty-free (certified by Leaping Bunny) and Smart 8-Free, meaning they do not contain ammonia, PPD, resorcinol, parabens, phthalates, gluten, SLS, or titanium dioxide.

The product does contain ethanolamine, a carcinogen known to cause hair loss.

== Awards and recognition ==
Founder Amy Errett has been included on multiple business and leadership lists, including:

- Forbes’s "50 Over 50" (2021) "
- Inc.’s Female Founders 100 (2018).
- Fast Company’s Queer 50 list (multiple years)
- San Francisco Business Times’ Most Influential Women in Bay Area Business (2018).
- Ernst & Young’s Entrepreneur Of The Year® Bay Area Award (2022).
