= Artscape (organisation) =

Swedish not-for-profit organisation

- Formation: 2014; 12 years ago
- Headquarters: Malmö, Sweden
- Website: www.artscape.se

Artscape is a nonprofit organization working predominantly within street art and public art. It was founded in Malmö, Sweden in 2014 by Daniel Wakeham and Tor Hedendahl. Artscape has produced several street art festivals, inviting international artists to create street art in different parts of Sweden. Alongside the production of the artworks, the organization has also arranged artist talks, workshops and panel discussions. Artscape organised Sweden's first international street art festival in Malmö in 2014, and has since arranged street art projects in Gothenburg (2016), and Värmland (2017).

== Activities ==
Artscape was set up to promote public art, and challenge the "dominance of the advertising boards" through the use of street art in the urban environment. Its projects are often undertaken in urban areas that are in need of, or are undergoing, regeneration.

== Exhibitions/Projects ==
- 2014 – 12 May – Malmö

Artists featured: Stinkfish, Phlegm, Above, Faith47, Magda Sayeg, Smug One, Cyrcle, Isaac Cordal, Mademoiselle Maurice, Natalia Rak, D*Face, Katy Beveridge, Leon, Ola Kalnins, Shalak, Smoky, Fiya, Amara por dios.

- 2015 – 'Cadavre Exquis', 2 September – Malmö

Artists featured: Bless, Zadok and Christina Angelina

- 2016 – 25 July – August (4 weeks) – Gothenburg

Artists featured: Bless, Cityzenkane, Code26, Eine, Disk, Elina Metso, Ligisd, Magda Sayeg, Ollio, Henrietta Kozica, Hueman, Jarus, Koralie & Supakitch, Rone, Yash, Ajja, Ana Maria and Animalitoland

- 2017 – ‘White Moose Project’, 24 July – Värmland: in Arvika, Filipstad, Forshaga, Grums, Karlstad, Munkfors Sunne, Säffle, Torsby, and Årjäng.

Artists featured: Nomad Clan, Wild Drawing, Yash, Faith47, Super G, Smug, Hyuro, Ledania, Henric Thåg, Sagie, Case Maclaim, Pantonio, Vexta, Tatiana Suarez, Captain Kris, BKfoxx, Bordalo ll, Caratoes, Hitotzuki, Annatomix, Shalak & Smoky, Pastel and Zadok.
