= Cabify =

Spanish ridesharing company

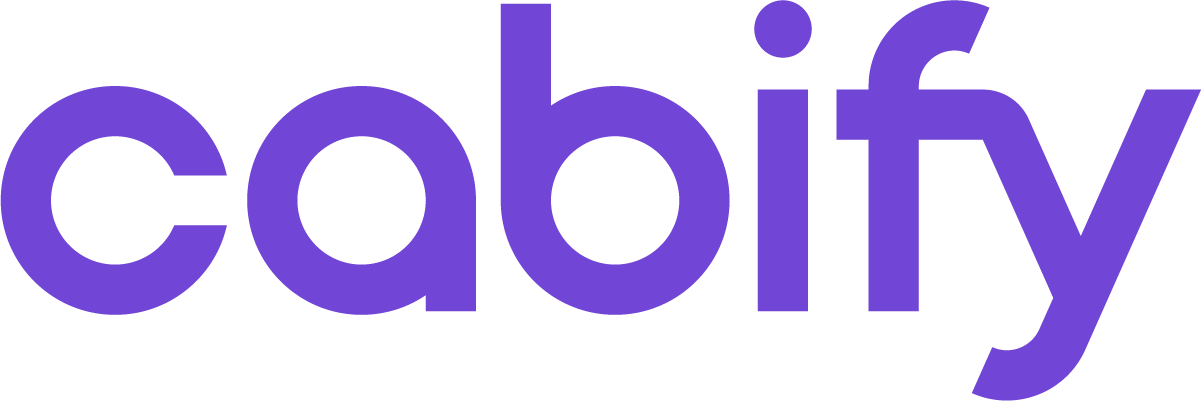
- Type: Private
- Industry: Vehicle for hire
- Founded: 2011
- Founder: Juan de Antonio
- Headquarters: Madrid, Spain
- Number of locations: 40 cities
- Areas served: Latin America; Spain
- Key people: Juan de Antonio Rubio (CEO)
- Number of employees: 1200 (2023)
- Website: cabify.com/en

Cabify is a platform to facilitate the transport of people and objects. The company operates in Spain and Latin America (Colombia, Peru, Argentina, Chile and Uruguay). Previously, it also operated in Portugal, Mexico, and Brazil.

Cabify was founded in 2011 by Juan de Antonio and was Spain's first Unicorn company.

== History and early investment ==
=== Development in Spain ===
Cabify was founded in May 2011 by Juan de Antonio, a Spanish entrepreneur, telecommunications engineer. De Antonio was motivated to create a vehicle for hire company after trying unsuccessfully to introduce electric vehicles in European cities.

Cabify started its operations in Madrid and the idea attracted Silicon Valley investors. De Antonio started discussing the idea with Adeyemi Ajao, one of the founders of Tuenti, and Brendan F. Wallace. Juan de Antonio continued as the CEO, while Ajao and Wallace became advisors. Samuel Lown joined the company as the CTO in July with Michael Koper and Adrian Merino joining the team two months later.

Initially, the service was called "Executive" and was intended for a niche group, with high-end vehicles that were slightly more expensive than taxis. In February 2012, Cabify had 20,000 users and completed nearly 3,000 rides in Madrid alone. In the next two years, more than 150 taxi drivers in Madrid joined the company.

In June 2013, the company launched Cabify Lite, with mid-range vehicles that were usually cheaper than taxis. By the end of 2015, Cabify Lite represented 85% of the company's offer. In 2016, the company partnered with Waze to complete its trips more quickly and improve driver and passenger safety. In 2016, Cabify launched in Portugal (Lisbon),

In May 2022, the company secured a EUR 40 million loan from the European Investment Bank to purchase a fleet of electric vehicles for use in Spain, in order to meet the European Union's goal of eliminating carbon emissions.

In October 2022, Cabify launched a new division and brand globally aimed at the storage and transfer of packages (rather than people), Cabify Logistics. In Spain, 100% of Cabify Logistics' fleet are electric vans dedicated exclusively to the parcel service.

The company operates in ten Spanish cities as of 2022 – Alicante, A Coruña, Barcelona, Madrid, Málaga, Murcia, Santander, Seville, Valencia and Zaragoza.

=== In Latin America ===
A year after its establishment in Spain, Cabify launched operations in Latin America, opening subsidiaries in Mexico, Chile and Peru.

Within a few years, 80% of Cabify's income would come from the American continent.

In 2016, Cabify increased expansion in Mexico. The Hoy No Circula program in Mexico City generated a 200% increase in demand. During that period, Cabify reduced its rates by 25% to motivate people to its services. It also donated part of its revenues to UNICEF. At that time, the company operated in six Mexican cities: Guadalajara, Mérida, México D. F., Monterrey, Puebla and Querétaro.

In 2016, Cabify started operating in Argentina (Buenos Aires and Rosario), Brazil (São Paulo), Costa Rica, Bolivia and Panama. It also announced it would expand its services to new cities, such as Valparaíso and Viña del Mar in Chile.

Cabify started offering services to the corporate sector in Bogotá in 2015. Cabify later opened in Cali in April 2016 and announced its expansion to Medellín and the Caribbean region, more precisely to the cities of Barranquilla and Cartagena. It currently offers its services in Barranquilla, Bogotá, Cali, Cartagena, Medellín and Pasto.

=== Angel funding and investments ===
In September 2012, the company raised a $4 million Series Seed investment round from Black Vine, Belgian fund Emerge, angel investors sourced via AngelList (including the Winklevoss twins), and a series of Latin American investors.

A second $8-million investment was round up in April 2014, and led by Seaya Ventures.

The company's biggest investor, Japanese e-commerce giant Rakuten, which is also a lead investor in taxi-app player Lyft, made its first investment in Cabify in October 2015, when it provided capital for a further push into Latin America. Cabify's revenues had risen to $40m, from $10m in 2014 and $1m in 2013. In April 2016, Rakuten invested $92 million more in Cabify. Rakuten's investment was a part of a round of funding in which Cabify raised $120 million. After the 2016 financing, Cabify was valued at around $320 million.

In January 2018, Cabify raised an additional $160 million, valuing the company at $1.4 billion. The company also cut 10% of its workforce and reorganized its top management.

== Description of services ==
=== Rideshare app ===
Cabify operates via a platform to connect customers and private drivers using a mobile app as well as its website. The app shows the location of drivers to the customer, calls the closest driver, directs the driver, and plays the role of intermediary for payments, taking a commission of around 20%. Once the ride is over, Cabify sends a summary to the customer's mobile phone and the customer can evaluate the ride and the driver.

Cabify offers three core classes of vehicles: Executive, Lite or Group (6 persons).

The company serves corporate and private passengers. Cabify considers corporate users to be the focus of the company's service offering although private passengers account for most of its revenue.

Cabify places an emphasis on repeat customers, for example by steering its cars in peak hours towards habitual users rather than those that offer the most lucrative one-off fare. Because of this approach, the company claims that it has no need to subsidize drivers or offer steep discounts to users, compared with rivals.

=== Other services ===
Cabify also offers a number of other services depending on location, including:

- Cabify Express, a service of immediate delivery via moto taxis, in Peru;
- Cabify Taxi, a service for accessing local taxi cabs, in Spain;
- Cabify City, a service of independent drivers, in Chile; and
- Cabify Cash, a service where users pay with cash instead of credit cards, in Peru.

Cabify also has a transportation option for disabled persons - Cabify Access - available in Chile, Spain and Peru. Cabify's has indicated that there are plans for a global expansion of Cabify Access.

=== Pricing ===
Cabify charges per kilometer of the optimal route. This means that it optimizes the distance between two points so the passenger is paying for the most direct route regardless of the actual route chosen by the driver. Uber, in comparison, charges according to minutes and kilometers spent inside the vehicles. In addition, Cabify has fixed pricing, where the price per kilometer does not change depending on the time of the day (as compared with dynamic prices, where price changes depending on peak hours, weather and local events. Cabify described its fixed pricing as a socially motivated feature.

=== Drivers ===
Cabify has selection and filter process for cars and drivers. All drivers must pass psychometric tests, tests for alcohol and drugs, and a city orientation test. They must show they have no criminal record or traffic violations. However, this selection process was marred by the murder of a young female customer in Puebla, Mexico by one of Cabify's drivers.

Cabify requires its drivers to wear 'professional' attire, to be polite and attend to the needs of the passenger. Drivers are also required to take the fastest way to the destination - if they change the route without the passenger's approval, they can be penalized by Cabify.

=== Passenger safety ===
In March 2017, the killing of the 19-year-old girl Maria Castilla by a Cabify driver in Mexico raised questions regarding the safety with ride-hailing services. Cabify installed a panic button in its app to prevent other similar crimes.

== Legal position ==
Cabify tries to work with governments to find a way to operate legally.

=== Spain ===
In the case of Spain, all the drivers work as "collaborators" for Cabify, and they do this under a commercial contract for the supply of services, either as part of a company or as freelance owners of a vehicle fleet. Drivers can be either the direct suppliers of the service or the hired personnel of a freelance fleet provider. Cabify's drivers do not receive monthly or yearly fixed salaries from the company. Their income comes from the invoicing of journeys and the amount of services they have provided.

In July 2018, a violent taxi-driver strike in Barcelona forced the company to suspend its services until further notice. In September 2018, drivers for ride-hailing services including Cabify protested against the Spanish government's proposition to tighten rules for the services. In January 2019, Cabify suspended its operations in Barcelona after the Catalan government voted a new rule requiring a 15-minute notice for booking a car. Its service was restored in Barcelona in March 2019. A specific system architecture was developed for Catalonia to comply with the region's stricter laws.

=== Chile ===
The taxi union of Santiago protested against Cabify and Uber, announcing a national strike in May 2016. After trying to find a legal solution with the Chilean government for over six months without success, Cabify launched Cabify City, which connects independent car owners with users on the Cabify app. Cabify City is its first unregulated service.

=== Colombia ===
On May 9, 2017, the Colombian Superintendence of Ports and Transport fined Cabify $516 million Colombian pesos (about $170,000 US dollars), saying it "facilitated the transgression of transport laws stated by the Government of Colombia, by allowing personal transport services to operate in special transport vehicles that were not authorized by the Ministry of Transport for this modality of services".
