= CarbonCure Technologies =

Manufacturer of carbon utilization technologies

- Company type: Private
- Industry: Carbon Utilization Technology
- Founder: Robert Niven
- Headquarters: Halifax, Nova Scotia, Canada
- Website: carboncure.com

CarbonCure Technologies Inc. is a manufacturer of carbon utilization technologies that inject captured carbon dioxide into concrete where it is immediately and permanently mineralized. This carbon mineralization maintains the material's compressive strength and enables producers to use less carbon-intensive cement in their concrete mixes, reducing both cement costs and emissions. The company was founded in 2012 by Robert Niven, and the company headquarters are in Halifax, Nova Scotia.

== Technologies ==
CarbonCure holds more than 120 patents related to carbon mineralization and carbon dioxide storage in concrete.

In 2023, CarbonCure worked with Heirloom Carbon Technologies on a demonstration using carbon dioxide captured from the air in concrete.

Projects that have been built with concrete using CarbonCure's technologies include Amazon HQ2 in Arlington, Virginia, General Motors Spring Hill Manufacturing Plant in Spring Hill, Tennessee and 1072 West Peachtree Street in Atlanta, Georgia.

== Funding ==
Investors include Sustainable Development Technology Canada, Innovacorp, GreenSoil Investments, Pangaea Ventures, Breakthrough Energy Ventures, Microsoft Climate Innovation Fund, BDC Capital, 2150, Mitsubishi Corporation, Carbon Direct, Taronga Ventures, and Amazon's Climate Pledge Fund.

== Recognition ==
The XPrize Foundation named CarbonCure one of two $7.5 million grand prize winners of the 4.5 year NRG COSIA Carbon XPRIZE competition in April 2021. Other prestigious titles include 2022 CNBC Disruptor 50 List Company and Cleantech 100 Hall of Fame Company after ranking on the Global Cleantech 100 list for seven consecutive years.
