= Institutional Limited Partners Association =

Institutional Limited Partners Association (ILPA)
- Abbreviation: ILPA
- Formation: 2002
- Type: Trade association
- Purpose: Industry standards, education, events, advocacy, and research for private equity limited partners
- Headquarters: Washington, D.C., U.S.
- Members: 500+ institutional investors
- CEO: Steve Nelson
- Website: ilpa.org

The Institutional Limited Partners Association (ILPA) is a trade association for institutional limited partners in the private equity asset class. It is headquartered in Washington, D.C., and has an additional office in Toronto, Ontario.

ILPA was co-founded by Private Equity Hall-of-Famer Thomas B. Judge, Sr. in the early 1990s.

== Membership ==
Members of ILPA include public and corporate pension funds, endowments, foundations, insurance companies, family offices, and sovereign wealth funds. According to ILPA, its membership totals more than 500 investors representing over $2 trillion in private equity investments.

The limited partner investor universe in private equity has historically been highly fragmented and individual investors, even the largest investors, often have limited ability to negotiate the terms of the individual private equity funds to which they commit.

== ILPA Private Equity Principles ==
In September 2009, ILPA released a set of guidelines, the Private Equity Principles, intended to provide a common set of terms which institutional limited partners could use as the basis for negotiation with fund managers.
