= Brendan F. Wallace =

American businessperson

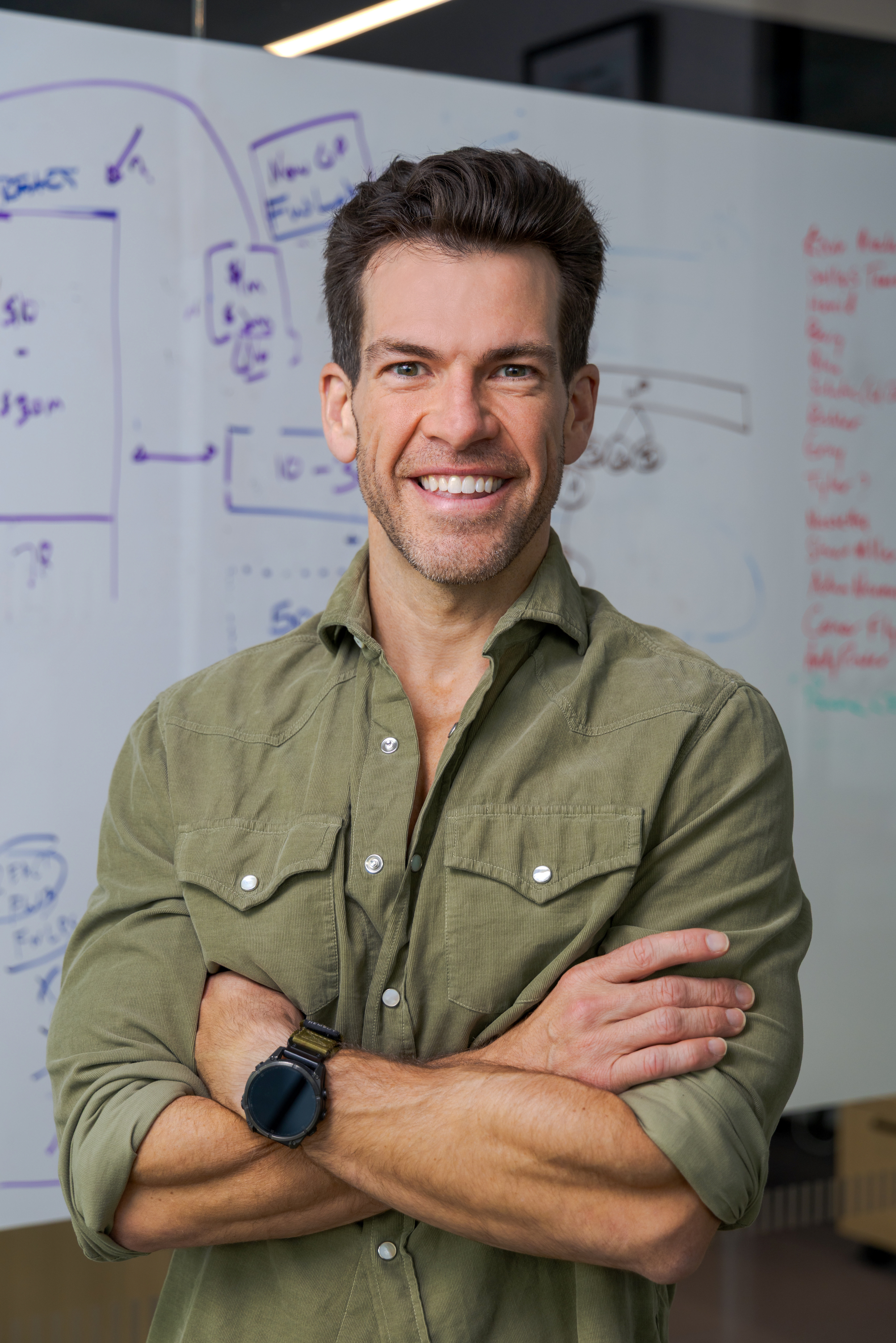
- Wallace in 2026
- Born: Brendan Fitzgerald Wallace; September 10, 1983 (age 42); New York City, New York, U.S.
- Education: Stanford Graduate School of Business Princeton University
- Occupation: Businessperson
- Years active: 2010–present
- Known for: Cofounder of Fifth Wall, Cabify and Identified, Inc

Brendan F. Wallace is an American businessman and investor. He is the founder and CEO of Fifth Wall. He also cofounded artificial intelligence platform Identified, Inc., which he sold to Workday, and the ridesharing service Cabify.

== Early life and education ==
Brendan Fitzgerald Wallace was born and raised in New York City. He graduated from Princeton University with a bachelor's degree in political science and economics in 2004, and received an MBA from the Stanford Graduate School of Business in 2010. While at Stanford, Wallace became interested in technology and entrepreneurship, and he went on to found several companies with his former classmates.

== Career ==
=== Early career ===
Wallace began his career as a real estate analyst at Goldman Sachs and worked for The Blackstone Group's real estate division, where he was a part of Blackstone's acquisition of Hilton Hotels.

=== Identified, Inc. ===
In 2010, Wallace cofounded career networking platform Identified, Inc., with Adayemi Ajao. The platform's model is based on gamification, and had 10 million users within eight months of its launch. Early versions of Identified's database were used by employers such as Google, Disney, and McKinsey & Company. It received $33 million in venture capital between 2010 and 2014. Wallace was co-CEO of the company until it was acquired by Workday, Inc. in 2014.

=== Cabify ===
In 2012, Wallace cofounded the Latin American ridesharing service Cabify, with Ajao and Spanish entrepreneur Juan de Antonio. Wallace currently sits on the company's advisory board. Cabify reached a valuation of $1.4 billion in 2018, making it a unicorn.

=== Fifth Wall ===
In 2016, Wallace and Brad Greiwe cofounded Fifth Wall, a venture capital firm which invests in PropTech ventures, including technologies which decarbonize the real estate industry. As of 2021, it was one of the largest property technology venture investors in the United States. In July 2022, the firm raised $500 million for its inaugural Climate Fund. In 2023, the company closed an $866 million investment fund, which The Wall Street Journal reported was the largest real estate investment fund in history.

According to LA Business Journal, he was one of the most influential business executives between 2019 and 2022. Commercial Observer included him on its Power 100 list in 2021 and 2022.

== Personal life ==
Wallace adopted a three-legged pit bull-mix named Lady Macbeth in 2021. They appeared on the Netflix series Canine Intervention.

He dated British actress Emma Watson in 2018. He later dated American actress Alexandra Daddario in 2019.
