= Marc Leverette =

American photographer (born 1978)

- Born: 1978 (age 47–48); Florida, United States
- Occupations: Photographer, author, artist
- Website: http://marcleverettephotography.com/

Marc Leverette is an American photographer and multi-media artist.

== Biography ==
Born in Florida in 1978, Leverette attended Mariner High School, Edison Community College, Florida Gulf Coast University, New York University, and Rutgers, the State University of New Jersey. Until 2008 he worked as a university professor at a number of institutions, including NYU, Rutgers, St. Peter's College, and Colorado State University.

Leverette began his photography career in Florida in 1997. In 2006 he opened The Monkey Lab (sometimes rendered stylistically as themonkeylab), serving as its art director and creative consultant. Since 2009, he has been heavily involved in the northern Colorado music scene in both capacities.

Leverette's work revolves around identity, specifically his own, claiming he "examines the notion of selfhood and identity within the process of mediation."

Much of his recent work examines the archiving of everyday life. From September 22, 2013 - September 22, 2014, he took fifty-five still photographs a day in a project called The Fifty Five. Those same years between July and July he recorded a small amount of footage daily. The journal resulted in the experimental feature Capers in Dry Brine. One of his other experimental features, All This Useless Beauty, is an exploration in how we remember.
