= Astra 1D =

Communications satellite

- Mission type: Communications
- Operator: SES
- COSPAR ID: 1994-070A
- SATCAT no.: 23331
- Website: ses.com
- Mission duration: 12 years (planned); 27 years (achieved)

Spacecraft properties
- Spacecraft type: Boeing 601
- Bus: HS-601
- Manufacturer: Hughes Space and Communications
- Launch mass: 2,924 kg (6,446 lb)
- Power: 3.3 kW

Start of mission
- Launch date: 1 November 1994, 00:37:00 UTC
- Rocket: Ariane 42P (V69)
- Launch site: Centre Spatial Guyanais, ELA-2
- Contractor: Arianespace
- Entered service: January 1995

End of mission
- Disposal: Graveyard orbit
- Deactivated: November 2021

Orbital parameters
- Reference system: Geocentric orbit
- Regime: Geostationary orbit
- Longitude: Astra 19.2°E (1994-1998); Astra 28.2°E (1998); Astra 19.2°E (1998-1999); Astra 28.2°E (1999-2001); 24.2° East (2001-2003); 23° East (2003-2004); Astra 23.5°E (2004-2007); Astra 31.5°E (2007-2010); 1.8° East (2010-2012); Astra 23.5°E (2012-2013); 52.2° East (2013-2014); 67.5° West (2014-2015); 47.5° West (2015-2017); 73° West (2017-2021)

Transponders
- Band: 18 (+6) Ku-band
- Bandwidth: 26 MHz
- Coverage area: Europe

Astra 1D is a geostationary communications satellite launched in 1994 by the Société Européenne des Satellites (SES). As of August 2012, the craft remains in service for occasional use.

Astra 1D was the fourth, and under original plans, last Astra communications satellite from SES. It was launched to SES' original solitary operational position at 19.2° East, and was intended as an in-orbit spare for Astra's Astra 1A, 1B and 1C and to carry digital TV transmissions. However, development of digital reception equipment in Europe was not sufficiently advanced for Astra 1D to be SES' first digital satellite (the later Astra 1E fulfilled that role) and demand for additional capacity for both British and German television channels led to 12 of the satellite's transponders being leased to broadcast analogue TV channels before the satellite had been launched.

== History ==
After launch to 19.2° East, Astra 1D served two periods as a spare at the Astra 28.2°E position colocated with Astra 2A, for seven months in 1998 and for 13 months from December 1999. In between these two periods, it returned to the Astra 19.2°E position. During this time, some small numbers of transponders were used for regular service. After other Astra craft (Astra 2B, Astra 2D) either arrived or were ordered for the slot, it moved to 24.2° East where it spent over two years carrying little more than test cards or feeds, until a move to 23° East (November 2003) and then 23.5° East (September 2004) where Euro1080 began to use it as their main transmitting craft.

When the satellite originally went on air in January 1995, several of its transponders were used by British Sky Broadcasting for new channels such as Granada Talk TV. These transponders broadcast on frequencies outside (below) the tuning range offered by the original Sky set-top-box receiver (with a 950-1750 MHz IF tuning range) and a standard Astra Low-noise block downconverter (LNB) (with a 10.00 GHz local oscillator) so Sky produced a frequency shifter ("ADX Plus Channel Expander"), comprising a small box connected between the LNB and the receiver (and powered by the receiver) with a single manual switch to select between Astra 1A and Astra 1D reception. Switched to Astra 1D reception, this shifted up the IF signal from the LNB by 250 MHz to bring the new frequencies within the receiver's tuning range. Subsequent Sky receivers had an 'extended' 950-2150 MHz IF tuning range and were used with an 'Enhanced LNB' with a 9.75 GHz local oscillator to enable reception of all the transponders used on the Astra 1A-1D satellites.

In November 2007, Astra 1D was replaced at the Astra 23.5°E position by Astra 1E, and was moved to 31.5° East, where it operated in inclined orbit, to replace Optus A3, and was joined in April 2008 by Astra 5A to officially open the Astra 31.5°E position.

On 16 January 2009, Astra 5A suffered a technical failure and all traffic ceased. Much of it (especially channels for German cable service, Kabel Deutschland) transferred to Astra 23.5° East as Astra 1D was not suitable for the transmission of these services because it was in an inclined orbit. In May 2009, Astra 2C was moved from the 28.2° East position to Astra 31.5° East to take over Astra 5A's mission with Astra 1D as ultimate backup. In June 2010, Astra 1G was moved from Astra 23.5° East to Astra 31.5° East (following the launch of Astra 3B to 23.5° East), where it could take over all broadcasting activity from Astra 2C, releasing Astra 2C for backup, and releasing Astra 1D for use elsewhere. Astra 1D then commenced movement westwards and in August 2010 arrived at 1.8° East where, with Astra 1C at 2.0° East it was used for occasional traffic such as outside broadcast news feeds. Astra 1D returned 23.5° East in 2012 with two transponders active for several months (both carrying the Luxembourg terrestrial channel, RTL Télé Lëtzebuerg).

In June 2013, the satellite moved east from 23.5° East (although it remained listed in the SES website as at this position) to 52.2° East. In February 2014, Astra 1D began moving westward, reaching its destination of 67.5° West in June 2014, where it was joined by Astra 1H in August 2014, moved from 19.2° East. Both Astra 1D and Astra 1H were moved close to NSS-806 at 47.5° West in the Spring/Summer of 2015. In 2017, Astra 1D was moved to 73° West. Since November 2021, 1D has been non-operational and drifting west at approximately 4.8°/day.

== Transponders ==
The channels broadcast on Astra 1D during its time at 19.2° East (1994-2000) include:

Transponder	Frequency	Channels
49	10,714 H	Arte (1995-2002), Nickelodeon Germany (1995–1996), Der Kinderkanal (1997-2012)
50	10,729 V	NBC Super Channel (1995-1996), CNBC Europe (1996-2005), Das Vierte (2005-2010), Mediashop (2010)
51	10,744 H	Veronica (1995–1996), CMT Europe (1996-1998), Bloomberg Television (1998-2000), Animal Planet (1998-2001), Sky Box Office 1 (1999-2000)
52	10,759 V	RTL 4 (1995–1996), QVC Germany (1996-2012)
53	10,773 H	SBS6 (1995–1996), JSTV (1996-2001), CNE (1995-1998), The Racing Channel (1996), What's in Store (1998-2000)
54	10,788 V	TV Asia (1995-1996), The Chinese Channel (1995–1997), Zee TV (1997-2000), Adult Channel (1997-1998)
55	10,803 H	Teleclub (1995–2000), N24 (2000-2012)
56	10,818 V	UK Horizons (1998), UK Arena (1998), UK Style (1998), Bloomberg Germany (1998-2000), TV Travel Shop (1998-2001), Bloomberg UK (2000-2001), TV Travel Shop German (2001-2004)
57	10,832 H	SBS6 (1996), Sky Barker (1996-1997), UK Horizons (1998-2001), UK Play (1999-2001), GOD (2001), TVX (2001)
58	10,847 V	Granada Good Life (1996-1998), Computer Channel (1996-1998), Sky Box Office 4 (1997-2000), Zomer TV (1997), Granada Breeze (1998-2000), .TV (1998-2000), Adult Channel PPV (1998-2000), B.TV (2000-2001), Tango TV (2002), TV Shop Deutschland (2002-2004)
59	10,862 H	Granada Talk TV (1996-1997), Sky Scottish (1996-1998), Sky Box Office 3 (1997-1998), Rapture TV (1998-2000) Channel 4 Extra (1998-1999), FilmFour (1999-2000), K1010 (2004)
60	10,877 V	Sky Movies Gold (1995-1997), The Weather Channel (1996-1998), The Racing Channel (1995-2000), Sky Box Office 2 (1997-1999), TV Shop (1998), Playboy TV PPV (1998-1999) Sky Box Office 3 (1999-2000), Playboy TV (2000), Adult Channel (2000)
61	10,891 H	ProSieben Schweiz (1996-1997), Phoenix (1997), SWR Rheinland-Pfalz (1997-2012)
62	10,906 V	Home Order Television (1995-2001), Home Shopping Europe (2001-2012)
63	10,921 H	Filmnet (1993-1997), The Adult Channel (1995-1997), Channel 5 (1997-2001), TV Shop Deutschland (2002), GOD (2002)
64	10,936 V	RTL 5 (1993-1996), tm3 (1996-2001), 9live (2001-2010)

== See also ==
- Astra 31.5°E previous orbital position
- Astra 19.2°E original orbital position
- SES (operator)
- Astra satellite family
