= Astra 1B =

Communications satellite

- Names: Satcom K3
- Mission type: Communications
- Operator: SES
- COSPAR ID: 1991-015A
- SATCAT no.: 21139
- Website: ses.com
- Mission duration: 12 years (planned); 15 years (achieved)

Spacecraft properties
- Bus: GE-5000 (formerly AS-5000)
- Manufacturer: GE Astro Space (formerly RCA Astro Electronics)
- Launch mass: 2,580 kg (5,690 lb)
- Power: 2,136 watts

Start of mission
- Launch date: 2 March 1991, 23:36:00 UTC
- Rocket: Ariane 44 LP H10 (V42)
- Launch site: Centre Spatial Guyanais, ELA-2
- Contractor: Arianespace
- Entered service: May 1991

End of mission
- Disposal: Graveyard orbit
- Deactivated: 14 July 2006
- Last contact: 2002

Orbital parameters
- Reference system: Geocentric orbit
- Regime: Geostationary orbit
- Longitude: 19.2° East

Transponders
- Band: 16 Ku-band
- Bandwidth: 26 MHz
- Coverage area: Europe

Astra 1B was the second of the Astra communications satellites launched and operated by SES (Société Européenne des Satellites) to add extra capacity to the satellite television (direct broadcasting) services from 19.2° East, serving Germany, the United Kingdom and Ireland.

== Satcom K3 ==
SES bought the satellite in 1989 from failed direct broadcast satellite (DBS) company Crimson Satellite Associates while still under construction by GE Astro Space (as Satcom K3). Twelve years later, in 2001, SES acquired GE Americom, which originally was to operate the Satcom K3 satellite (and was itself the result of General Electric's purchase of RCA Corporation in 1986) and renamed it "SES Americom". It was merged with SES New Skies to form SES World Skies before the company was merged into its parent company, SES S.A. in 2011.

== Mission ==
On 4 June 1991, Astra 1B suffered an attitude control failure, causing minor drift in north–south direction, meaning that it became difficult to obtain a steady lock on the satellite. This was most notable on analogue transmissions where the picture would move from clear to carrying sparklies and back again. The failure was likely caused by recent solar winds which impacted the electronics on both the primary and the backup momentum wheels. In September 1991, SES dealt with the failure by permanently deactivating the automatic control mode for the attitude subsystem.

Along with Astra 1C, Astra 1B was to be replaced in 2002 with Astra 1K, which failed to launch successfully, and as a result it continued to serve a longer life than expected, only falling from use when digital television on Astra 2A removed the majority of United Kingdom and Ireland targeted channels from 19.2° East. From 2005, SES claimed that the satellite was in use for VSAT services, however no transponders were powered, and the satellite drifted to around 19.5° East. One transponder was reactivated in October 2005, but was carrying only colour bars.

== Decommissioning ==
On 16 June 2006, SES confirmed that Astra 1B would be decommissioned and de-orbited within weeks after Astra 1KR, the satellite which would replace Astra 1B and 1C, reached the operational orbital position of 19.2° East. It was officially end-of-lifed on 14 July 2006; close to four years after it had ceased carrying signals, ending SES's claims that the craft was operational.

== Transponders ==
Astra 1B transponders were used in the following ways during the operational life of the satellite:

Transponder	Frequency	Channels carried
17	11,464 H	Premiere (1991–2003), Sonnenklar.TV (2003–2009)
18	11,479 V	The Movie Channel (1991–1997), Sky Movies Screen 2 (1997–1998), Sky Premier (1998–2001)
19	11,494 H	ARD 1 Plus (1991–1993), Das Erste (1993-2012)
20	11,509 V	Sky Sports (1991–2001), Sky Sports 2 (2001-2002)
21	11,523 H	Tele 5 (1991–1992), DSF (1993-2010)
22	11,538 V	Eurosport (1991–1992), MTV Europe (1992–1993), VH1 UK (1994–2001), GOD (2001-2002)
23	11,553 H	Astra Video (1991), FilmNet (1991–1992), UK Gold (1992–2001), What's In Store (1993-1997), HSN (1997), Screenshop (1997-2000), Astra Vision (2001-2002), Tele 5 (2002-2012)
24	11,568 V	JSTV (1991-1996), The Children's Channel (1991-1994), CMT Europe (1994–1996), Sky Barker (1996–1997), Sky Soap (1997–1999), The History Channel UK (1997–2001), Sci-fi Channel UK (1997–2001), GOD (1997-2001), Adult Channel (1997-2000), Bloomberg UK (2001-2002), SFB1 (2001-2002)
25	11,582 H	Nord 3 (1991–2001), NDR Fernsehen (2001-2012)
26	11,597 V	Astra Info (1991), Comedy Channel (1991-1992), TV Asia (1991-1994), The Adult Channel (1991-1993), Sky Movies Gold (1992-1997), Disney Channel UK (1995–2001), Sky Box Office 1 (1997-1999)
27	11,612 H	TV3 Denmark (1991–1996), Nickelodeon Nordic/Sci-Fi Channel Nordic/Nova Shop (1996), VH-1 Germany/Nickelodeon Germany (1996-1998), MTV Germany (1999-2010)
28	11,627 V	CNN International (1992-2010)
29	11,641 H	TV3 Denmark (1991), Astra Info (1992), n-tv (1992-2012)
30	11,656 V	Astra Info (1991-1992), Cinemanía (1992-1997), ORB Fernsehen (1997-2003)
31	11,671 H	TV3 Norway (1991–1996), Sky Sports 3 (1996–2001), TV Shop (1996-2000), Playboy TV (1996-1999), Midnight Blue (1999-2001), Nick Jr. UK (1999-2000), TV Puls (2002-2003)
32	11,686 V	Documanía (1992–1996), Sportsmanía (1996–1997), Astra Vision (1997), BR alpha (1998–2002)

== See also ==
- SES (operator)
- Astra satellite family
- Astra 19.2°E
- Astra 1A
- Astra 1C
- Astra 1D
- Astra 1E
- Astra 1K
- Astra 1KR
