= Astra 19.2°E =

Group of communications satellites

The Astra brand logo

Astra 19.2°E is the name for the group of Astra communications satellites co-located at the 19.2°East orbital position in the Clarke Belt that are owned and operated by SES based in Betzdorf, Luxembourg.

Astra 19.2°E used to be commonly known as Astra 1, as it was the first orbital position used by Astra and the craft positioned there all have the Astra 1x name, but this was changed by SES to Astra 19.2°E in 2008, to avoid confusion with other Astra orbital positions that now include Astra 1x craft originally positioned at 19.2°East.

The Astra satellites at 19.2°East provide for services downlinking in the 10.70 GHz-12.70 GHz range of the K_{u} band.

Astra 19.2°E is one of the major TV satellite positions serving Europe, transmitting over 1,150 TV, radio and interactive channels to more than 93 million direct-to-home (DTH) and cable homes in 35 countries (the other major satellite positions being at 13° East, 28.2° East, 23.5° East, and 5° East).

There are more than 40 high definition television (HDTV) channels broadcast by the satellites at 19.2°E, using five HDTV platforms. SES was instrumental in introducing satellite HDTV broadcasting in Europe, using the Astra 19.2°E satellites, and helped establish the HD ready specifications for TVs to view HDTV broadcasts. A subsidiary of SES, HD+ operates the HD+ free-to-view platform of German channels from Astra 19.2°E.

Astra 19.2°E was one of the last satellite positions to carry numerous analogue channels, until 30 April 2012 when the switch-off of German analogue broadcasts was completed. It is also the only position to have carried radio stations in the proprietary Astra Digital Radio format, although that technology was superseded by DVB-S radio as the analogue transponders that carried the service switched to digital.

== Satellites in use ==
=== Current ===
- Astra 1M (launched 2008)
- Astra 1N (launched 2011)
- Astra 1P (launched 2024)

=== Previous ===
- Astra 1A (launched 1988, retired)
- Astra 1B (launched 1991, retired)
- Astra 1C (launched 1993, retired)
- Astra 1D (launched 1994, retired)
- Astra 1E (launched 1995, retired)
- Astra 1F (launched 1996, retired)
- Astra 1G (launched 1997, retired)
- Astra 1H (launched 1999, retired)
- Astra 1KR (launched 2006, occasional use)
- Astra 1L (launched 2007, occasional use)
- Astra 2B (launched 2000, retired)
- Astra 2C (launched 2001, retired)

=== Upcoming ===
- Astra 1Q (to be launched in 2027)

== Market ==
The satellites at the Astra 19.2°E position primarily provide digital TV, digital radio and multimedia services to Europe and North Africa, principally to Algeria, Austria, Belgium, France, Germany, Morocco, the Netherlands, Poland, Spain, Switzerland, and Tunisia.

Astra 19.2°E provides both free-to-air and a number of pay-TV services in networks such as ARD Digital, ArenaSat, CanalDigitaal, CanalSat, ORF Digital, Sky Germany, ProSieben, Movistar+, Sat.1, UPC Direct, and ZDF, and is the market leader for DTH and communal dish reception in Austria, Belgium, France, Germany, the Netherlands, Spain and Switzerland.

The relatively close proximity of Astra 19.2°E to one of SES' other orbital positions, Astra 23.5°E, allows the use in target countries of a single small dish fitted with a monoblock Duo LNB to receive channels from both positions.

== Capacity and reach ==
As of December 2019 the Astra satellites at 19.2° east broadcast on 147 transponders (2 Ka-band and 145 Ku-band) to 118.4 million households (44.7 million via cable, 27.5 million via IPTV and 46.2 million direct to home satellite dishes).

== History ==
Launched in 1988, Astra 1A was the first satellite in the Astra 19.2°E group. With 16 transponders, Astra 1A was the first satellite intended for DTH reception of satellite TV across Europe. From the start of transmissions in 1989, Astra 1A carried four channels for Sky Television, the world's first commercial multi-channel DTH service, on transponders leased before the satellite was completed.

Early channels broadcasting from 19.2°East included those primarily intended for the UK, Germany, the Benelux countries, and Scandinavia, and so-called pan-European channels such as MTV Europe, CNN International, and Eurosport.

Astra 1A was joined at 19.2°East by Astra 1B in 1991 and subsequently by Astra 1C in 1993, establishing SES' principles of co-locating satellites for the provision of transparent backup by each satellite for the others in the group.

The first three satellites at Astra 19.2°E carried only analogue channels in PAL and D2-MAC. The fourth satellite, Astra 1D launched in 1994, was originally intended to carry the first European digital TV channels but the rapid expansion of satellite television across Europe and demand for analogue TV capacity meant that it was primarily used for analogue signals.

Astra 1E (1995) was dedicated to digital satellite TV services for Europe and subsequent satellites launched to Astra 19.2°E were also all-digital in the traffic they carried.

Hand-in-hand with the switchover to digital transmission of TV by satellite came a shift to encryption and the targeting of channels to individual countries or regions. The demand for digital TV capacity was so great that SES opened up additional orbital positions to provide for new digital networks aimed at specific countries, starting with Astra 28.2°E for the UK and Ireland, in 1998. That became the home of Sky Digital, and the last Sky analogue channels left Astra 19.2°E in 2001.

Most Scandinavian broadcasters have migrated from Astra 19.2°E to 1°West and Astra 5°E, and SES has also opened orbital positions of Astra 23.5°E and Astra 31.5°E to cope with the ever-increasing demands for digital capacity and the expanding markets of Eastern Europe, Africa and Asia that are now served by Astra satellites.

In November 2021, SES ordered two replacement satellites from Thales Alenia Space for launch to Astra 19.2°E in 2024 as Astra 1KR and Astra 1L reach the end of their planned life. Astra 1P will provide direct-to-home broadcast TV to Europe, in particular Germany, France and Spain. Astra 1Q is a reconfigurable software defined satellite with both wide beams for broadcast TV and high-throughput spot beams for video and data customers. Both new satellites should provide service well into the 2040s.

In June 2024, Astra 1P was successfully launched from Cape Canaveral on a Falcon 9 Block 5 rocket. Using all-electric thrusters, the satellite took several months to reach geostationary orbit, and was first positioned at 9.5° West for testing, which was successfully completed in December 2024, and then moved to 19.2° East to begin service in early 2025. Starting in February 2025, all broadcast channels were moved off Astra 1KR and Astra 1L to Astra 1P in preparation for the older satellites' retirement, and Astra 1L was moved from the 19.2°E orbital slot to 19.4° East in March 2025.

== Channels ==
Tp	Frequency	89	90	91	92	93	94	95	96	97	98	99	00	01	02	03	04	05	06	07	08	09	10	11	12
49	10,714 H							Nickelodeon Germany (95-96)		Der Kinderkanal (1997–2012)															
49	10,714 H							Arte (1995–2003)								Primetime, Fresh 4U, Astro TV								sixx (11-12)	
50	10,729 V							NBC Super Channel (1995–1996), CNBC Europe (1996–2004)										Das Vierte (2005–2009)				Movistar+			
51	10,744 H							Veronica (1995–1996), CMT Europe (1996–1998), Bloomberg Television					Animal Planet	TV Puls				CNBC/ XXP	CNBC Germany			ARD Digital			
52	10,759 V							RTL 4 (95-96)	QVC Germany (1996–2012)																
53	10,773 H							SBS6 (95-96)	JSTV (1996–2001), CNE (1995–1998)									Movistar+						Anixe	
54	10,788 V							Zee TV (1996–2000), The Chinese Channel (1996–1998)							CanalSat		Movistar+								
55	10,803 H							Teleclub (1996–2000)					N24 (2000–2012)												
56	10,818 V							RAISAT TEST TAPE (1990-1996)	DF 1 (1996-1998)	UK Horizons (-98), UK Style (-98)		Bloomberg Germany (98-01), TV Travel Shop (-)					Movistar+								
57	10,832 H								SBS6 (1996)	ASTRA Promotional Tape (1996–1997)	UK Horizons (98–01), UK Play (–2001)									Movistar+			HD+ (2009-)		
58	10,847 V								Granada Good Life (1996–), Computer Channel (1996–), Granada Breeze (-2000), .TV (–2000), Zomer TV (–1996), Sky Box Office 4				B.TV (00–01)		Tango TV (02-), PIN24/TV Shop		Movistar+								
59	10,862 H								Granada Talk TV (96–97), Sky Scottish (96–98), Rapture TV (–2000), FilmFour (–2000)								K1010 TV (04-05)	TVP Digital (2005-)							
60	10,877 V							Sky Movies Gold (1995–1997), The Weather Channel (1996–), The Racing Channel (1996–2000), Sky Box Office 2						Get	Movistar+										
61	10,891 H							ProSieben (Switzerland) (1997), Phoenix (1997)			Südwest Fernsehen RP (1997–2012)														
62	10,906 V							Home Order Television (1995–2001)						HSE24 (2001–2012)											
63	10,921 H							Filmnet (1993–1997), The Adult Channel (1995–), Channel 5 (–2001)										UPC Direct							Premiere
64	10,936 V							RTL 5 (1993-1996)	tm3 (1996–2001)					9 Live (2001–2010)										Movistar+	
Tp	Frequency	89	90	91	92	93	94	95	96	97	98	99	00	01	02	03	04	05	06	07	08	09	10	11	12
33	10,964 H					ZDF (1993-2012)																			
34	10,979 V					UK Living (1993–2001), Television X (1995–?), Chinese Channel (1994–1995)														Movistar+					
35	10,994 H					The Children's Channel (1993–1998), The Family Channel (1993–1997), China News and Entertainment (1993–1994), Challenge (1997–2001)								Arte (-2012)											
36	11,009 V					Minimax (1993–1997), Documanía (1996–1997)				Phoenix (1997–2012)															
37	11,023 H					Cartoon Network UK (93-), TNT UK (93-00), TCM UK (00-01)								B.TV (01-05)				Astro TV (2005–08)				Premiere HD		Telespazio	SES/Canal Digitaal
38	11,038 V					QVC UK (1993–2001)								Movistar+											
39	11,053 H					WDR Fernsehen (1993–2012)																			
40	11,068 V					Cineclassics (1993–1997)				Hessen Fernsehen (-2012)															
41	11,082 H					Discovery Channel UK (1993–2001), CMT Europe (1993–1994), TLC UK (1994–1997), Discovery Home & Leisure UK (1997–2001)								BR-alpha (-2012)											
42	11,097 V					Bravo (1993–2001), The Adult Channel (1993–1995), EBN (1995–98), Trouble (1997–2001), CNBC Europe (-98)									DVB		Movistar+								
43	11,112 H					MDR Fernsehen (1993-2012)																			
44	11,127 V					Galavision (1993–1997), Sky Travel (1997–2000), Sky Movies Gold (1997–2000)										VIVA								Movistar+	
45	11,141 H					Bayerisches Fernsehen (1993–2012)																			
46	11,156 V					Nickelodeon UK (1993–2001), TV Asia (1993–1996), VH-1 Germany(1995), The Paramount Channel (1995–2001)								Movistar+											
47	11,171 H						Sky Sports 2 (94-01), Sci Fi Channel UK (95-97), Sky Soap (95-97), Sky Sports Gold (95-97), Sky Travel (95-97), The History Channel UK (95-97), China News and Entertainment (1994–1995)							SFB1 (01–03)		RBB Berlin (03–05)		1-2-3 TV (2004–2008)				Orange			
48	11,186 V					Südwest Fernsehen Baden-Württemberg (1993-2012)																			
Tp	Frequency	89	90	91	92	93	94	95	96	97	98	99	00	01	02	03	04	05	06	07	08	09	10	11	12
1	11,214 H	Screensport (1989–1993)				RTL2 (1993-2012)																			
2	11,229 V	RTL (1989–2012)																							
3	11,244 H	TV3 Sweden (1989–1996)							Granada Plus/Granada Men & Motors (1996–2001)					RTL Shop/Channel 21 Shop (2001–2011)											ORF Digital
4	11,259 V	Eurosport (1989–2012)																							
5	11,273 H	Lifestyle/The Children's Channel (1989–1993)				VOX (1993–2012)																			
6	11,288 V	Sat.1 (1989–2012)																							
7	11,303 H	TV1000 (1989–1996)							Fox Kids (1996–2001)					Viva Zwei (2001–2002), Viva Plus (2002–2007)						Comedy Central Germany (2007–2009)		ORF Digital HD (2009-)			
7	11,303 H	TV1000 (1989–1996)							Sky 2 (96-97)	National Geographic Channel (1997–2001), Channel 7 Europe (1998), Sky Barker (1997-?)				Viva Zwei (2001–2002), Viva Plus (2002–2007)						Comedy Central Germany (2007–2009)		ORF Digital HD (2009-)			
8	11,318 V	Sky One (1989–2001), TV Asia (1992–1994)													Movistar+										
9	11,332 H	Eurosp. (1989)	Teleclub (1990–1995)					Kabel 1 (1995–2012)																	
10	11,347 V	3sat (1990–2012), ZDF Musikkanal (1990–1993)																							ZDF HD
11	11,362 H	Filmnet (1989–1997), The Adult Channel (1997) Bloomberg UK (1997–1998), Sky Box Office 3 (1998–2000), Bloomberg DE (2000–2008)																			ARD/ZDF/Arte HD				ZDF HD
12	11,377 V	Sky News (1989–2001)																XXP (-06)	DMAX (2006–2011)						
13	11,391 H	RTL-Véronique (1989–1990)	RTL 4 (1990–1995)					Super RTL (1995–2012)																	
14	11,406 V	Pro Sieben (1989–2012)																							
15	11,421 H	MTV Europe (1989–1997)								MTV UK & Ireland (01-07)				MTV2 Pop (01-05)				Nick Germany (05-11), Comedy Central (09-11)							SES
16	11,436 V	Sky Movies (89-97), Sky Movies Screen 1 (97-98), Sky Moviemax (98-01)													Movistar+			Arena		Movistar+					
Tp	Frequency	89	90	91	92	93	94	95	96	97	98	99	00	01	02	03	04	05	06	07	08	09	10	11	12
17	11,464 H			Premiere (1991–2003)												sonnenklar.TV (2003–2009)							HD+ (2010-)		
18	11,479 V			The Movie Channel (91-97), Sky Movies Screen 2 (97-98), Sky Premier (98-01)											CanalSat										
19	11,494 H			Eins Plus (91-93)		Das Erste (1993–2012)																			ARD HD
20	11,509 V			Sky Sports (1991–1996)					Sky Sports 1 (1996–2001)						Movistar+		Globecast								
21	11,523 H			Tele 5 (91-92)		DSF/Sport1 (1993–2012)																			
22	11,538 V			Eurosport (1991), MTV Europe (1992–1994), VH1 UK (1994–2001)											Movistar+				Globecast						
23	11,553 H			FilmNet (91-92)	UK Gold (1992–2001)									Tele 5 (2002-2012)											
24	11,568 V			JSTV (1991-1996), The Children's Channel (1991-1993)			CMT Europe (1994–1996)			Sky Soap (1997–1999), The History Channel UK (1997–2001), Sci Fi Channel UK (1997–2001)						DVB							CanalSat		
25	11,582 H			Nord 3 (1991–2001), NDR Fernsehen (2001–2012)																					ARD HD
26	11,597 V			Comedy Channel (1991–1992), The Adult Channel (1992–1993), TV Asia (1992–1995), Sky Movies Gold (1992–1997), Disney Channel UK (1995–2001), Sky Box Office 1 (1997–1999)											DVB										
27	11,612 H			TV3 Denmark (1991–1996)					VH-1 Germany/ Nickelodeon Germany (1996–1998)		MTV Germany (1999–2010)													VIVA (11-12)	SES
28	11,627 V			CNN International (1992–2010)																				Movistar+	
29	11,641 H			TV3 D:k (1991)	n-tv (1992–2012)																				
30	11,656 V			Cinemanía (1992-?)					ORB Fernsehen/RBB Fernsehen (1997-2012)																
31	11,671 H			TV3 Norway (1991–1996)					Sky Sports 3 (1996–2001)					TV Puls (-2003)					UPC Direct						ProSieben
32	11,686 V			Documanía (1992–1996), Sportsmanía (1996–1997), BR alpha (1998-)											Movistar+										
Tp	Frequency	89	90	91	92	93	94	95	96	97	98	99	00	01	02	03	04	05	06	07	08	09	10	11	12
65	11,720 H								DF1			Premiere													
66	11,740 V								CanalSat							Viacom									
67	11,758 H										DF1	Premiere													
68	11,778 V								CanalSat							Turner									
69	11,798 H								DF1			Premiere													
70	11,817 V								CanalSat																
71	11,837 H								Astra service				ARD Digital												
72	11,856 V								CanalSat																
73	11,876 H								Nethold						DVB	UPC Direct		Netsyst.			Premiere				
74	11,895 V												Movistar+			CanalSat									
75	11,914 H																		Premiere						
76	11,934 V								Movistar+							CanalSat									
77	11,954 H								Nethold					ZDF Vision											
78	11,973 V										Movistar+							MTV Networks							
79	11,992 H										Wizja TV		UPC Direct											Premiere	
80	12,012 V								Nethold		CanalDigitaal		CanalSat												
81	12,032 H								DF 1			Premiere													
82	12,051 V								ProSiebenSat.1 Media																
83	12,070 H								DF 1			Premiere													
84	12,090 V								DF 1			Premiere								CanalSat					
Tp	Frequency	89	90	91	92	93	94	95	96	97	98	99	00	01	02	03	04	05	06	07	08	09	10	11	12
85	12,110 H								Premiere				ARD Digital												
86	12,129 V								CanalSat																
87	12,148 H									DF 1		Premiere					DPC	SES Platform Services (later MX1, now part of SES Video)							
88	12,168 V								DVB								HDTV			CanalSat					
89	12,188 H										RTL Group														
90	12,207 V								CanalSat																
91	12,226 H									DF 1		Filial TV				Eurosport									
92	12,246 V									Movistar+							DVB			SES Platform Services (later MX1, now part of SES Video)					
93	12,266 H								Nethold	AB Sat		CanalSat						ARD Digital							
94	12,285 V									Movistar+						CanalSat							Orange		
95	12,304 H										Wizja TV		UPC Direct											Premiere	
96	12,324 V								ARD	CanalSat															
97	12,344 H								Multichoice			CanalDigitaal										DVB			
98	12,363 V									CanalSat															
99	12,382 H									Wizja TV			UPC Direct											Premiere	
100	12,402 V									CanalSat															
101	12,422 H									ARD Digital	DF 1						ARD Digital								
102	12,441 V								Multichoice			Movistar+					HDTV			ArenaSat					
103	12,460 H									DF 1			Internet		DVB		DPC	SES Platform Services (later MX1, now part of SES Video)							
104	12,480 V									DF 1		DVB			DVB	DPC		SES Platform Services (later MX1, now part of SES Video)							
Tp	Frequency	89	90	91	92	93	94	95	96	97	98	99	00	01	02	03	04	05	06	07	08	09	10	11	12
105	12,515 H										CanalDigitaal														
106	12,522 V										Movistar+						CanalSat			CanalSat					
107	12,545 H													Chello HSI	DPC		AstraSat	AstraNet		ProSieben					
108	12,552 V										DVB														
109	12,574 H										CanalDigitaal														DVB
110	12,581 V										Movistar+					CanalSat									
111	12,604 H										ARD Digital	DVB	AstraNet					Sat@Once		DVB	ARD Digital				
112	12,610 V	DF 1										DVB							DF 1	CanalSat					
113	12,633 H														DVB	T-Systems					Media Broadcast				
114	12,640 V																						CanalSat		
115	12,663 H										ZDF Vision		Internet				DVB		ORF Digital						
116	12,670 V										Turner	DVB			DVB				TV Vlaanderen Digitaal		CanalSat				
117	12,692 H										ORF Digital														
118	12,699 V												MTV Networks							CanalSat					
119	12,722 H										ARD Digital			Netsyst.					ProSieben Sat.1 HDTV (05-08)		TV Vlaanderen Digitaal				
120	12,728 V												Internet			Satlynx				CanalSat					
Tp	Frequency	89	90	91	92	93	94	95	96	97	98	99	00	01	02	03	04	05	06	07	08	09	10	11	12

== See also ==
- SES satellite operator
- Astra satellite family
- HD+
- Astra 28.2°E other SES orbital position
- Astra 23.5°E other SES orbital position
- Astra 5°E other SES orbital position
- Astra 31.5°E other SES orbital position
- Duo LNB
