= Astra 2E =

Communications satellite for Europe and the Middle East

- Names: Eutelsat 28E
- Mission type: Communications
- Operator: SES S.A.
- COSPAR ID: 2013-056A
- SATCAT no.: 39285
- Website: https://www.ses.com/
- Mission duration: 15 years (planned); 12 years, 6 months, 30 days (elapsed)

Spacecraft properties
- Spacecraft type: Eurostar
- Bus: Eurostar-3000
- Manufacturer: Astrium (now Airbus Defence and Space)
- Launch mass: 6,020 kg (13,270 lb)

Start of mission
- Launch date: 29 September 2013, 21:38 UTC
- Rocket: Proton-M / Briz-M
- Launch site: Baikonur, Site 200/39
- Contractor: Khrunichev State Research and Production Space Center
- Entered service: February 2014

Orbital parameters
- Reference system: Geocentric orbit
- Regime: Geostationary orbit
- Longitude: 28.2° East

Transponders
- Band: 63 transponders: 60 Ku-band; 3 Ka-band
- Coverage area: Europe, Middle East, Africa

Astra 2E is one of the Astra communications satellites owned and operated by SES S.A., launched to the Astra 28.2°E orbital position on 30 September 2013 after a 10-week delay caused by launcher problems. The satellite provides free-to-air and encrypted direct-to-home (DTH) digital television and satellite broadband services for Europe and the Middle East.

After launch, Astra 2E underwent in-orbit testing at 43.5° East and began commercial operations at 28.2° East in February 2014. At that time, channels broadcast via Astra 1N (temporarily located at 28.2° East pending Astra 1E's launch) were transferred to Astra 2E and Astra 1N relocated to its design position at 19.2° East.

Astra 2E is the second of three "second generation" satellites for the 28.2° East position to replace the first generation Astra 2A, Astra 2B, Astra 2C and Astra 2D craft originally positioned there between 1998 and 2001. The first, Astra 2F, was launched in 2012, and the third, Astra 2G, was launched on 27 December 2014.)

Unlike other SES/Astra satellites, the launch order of Astra 2E and Astra 2F is not reflected in their alphabetical names, with Astra 2F launched 10 months before Astra 2E.

== Market ==
The Astra 28.2° East orbital position was established in 1998 to provide digital television, digital radio and multimedia services to the United Kingdom and Ireland, and Astra 2E's primary mission is to continue this provision as replacement and follow-on capacity to the Astra 2A, Astra 2D and Astra 1N satellites. Along with Astra 2F it delivers programming to almost 13 million satellite homes, over 3 million cable homes, and 700,000 Internet Protocol television (IPTV) homes in the United Kingdom and Ireland, in particular for channels from the major United Kingdom digital satellite television satellite bus, BSkyB and Freesat.

ASTRA 2E also delivers broadcast and Very-small-aperture terminal (VSAT) services in Europe, Middle East and Africa in Ku-band. and Ka-band capacity will provide internet via satellite with download speeds of up to 20 Mbit/s to Germany.

== Broadcasting footprint ==
Astra 2E has three Ku-band downlink beams covering Europe and the Middle East:

- The European Beam is centred on the English Channel with maximum signal over the United Kingdom, Ireland, France, Benelux, and parts of Germany, Austria, and Spain (including a "lobe" specifically designed to serve the Canary Islands), and reception on a larger dish extending to Italy, Poland, North Africa, and the Balkans.
- The UK Beam provides maximum signal (for 45 cm dishes) over the United Kingdom, Ireland, Benelux and Northern France with a sharp roll-off of signal level outside this region, in close approximation of the UK Beam of Astra 2D. This enables channels to be broadcast free-to-air but with reception effectively constrained to the British Isles, and has been the basis for the Freesat free-to-air United Kingdom platform.
- The Middle East beam is centred on the Arabian Peninsula and extends to Turkey and into East Africa, to provide for reception with 50 cm dishes.

The Ka-band footprint for satellite broadband provides full service coverage centred on central Europe and extending to France, Italy, the Balkans, the United Kingdom, and southern Sweden and Norway.

The satellite is fitted with 60 Ku-band transponders.

== Launch delay ==
The launch of Astra 2E was intended to be by International Launch Services (ILS) Proton-M launch vehicle on 21 July 2013, but the previous launch of this launch vehicle on 2 July 2013, carrying three Russian GLONASS navigation satellites, ended with the rocket exploding shortly after lift off and the Proton launch programme was postponed. The fault with the failed rocket was found to be the incorrect installation of three angular rate sensors, Roscosmos reported, and the launch programme was recommenced in September 2013.

== Television channels on Astra 2E ==
Below is a list, as of January 2025, of the TV channels broadcast from Astra 2E on its UK Beam and European Beam (the UK Beam is the most difficult to receive outside Britain and its islands):

In the list, television channels broadcast with a one-hour delay are shown Channel +1hr. Where both the original and the delayed channel are broadcast from the same transponder, this is shown in one entry as Channel [also +1hr].

UK Beam

Tp45 10.773 GHz H 23000 3/4 DVB-S2:

- BBC One North East & Cumbria HD
- BBC One North West HD
- BBC One Yorkshire HD
- BBC Parliament HD
- BBC Two Northern Ireland HD

Tp46 10.788 GHz V 23000 3/4 DVB-S2:

- BBC One Channel Islands HD
- BBC One South West HD
- BBC One West HD
- BBC Red Button 1 HD
- BBC Scotland HD

Tp48 10.818 GHz V 23000 3/4 DVB-S2:

- CBeebies HD
- BBC Four HD
- BBC One East HD
- BBC One East Midlands HD
- BBC One London HD
- BBC Two Wales HD

Tp50 10.847 GHz V 23000 3/4 DVB-S2:

- CBBC HD
- BBC One Northern Ireland HD
- BBC One South East HD
- BBC One Yorks & Lincs HD
- BBC Three HD
- BBC Two England HD

Tp56 10.936 GHz V 23000 3/4 DVB-S2:

- 4Seven
- Channel 4 London HD
- Channel 4 London +1hr
- Channel 4 North +1hr
- Channel 4 Scotland +1hr
- Channel 4 South & East +1hr
- E4 Extra
- E4 UK [also +1hr]
- Film 4 UK [also +1hr]
- More 4 UK [also +1hr]

Tp113 11.386 GHz H 27500 2/3 DVB-S2:

- ITV 1 Central West HD
- ITV 1 Channel TV HD
- ITV 1 Granada HD
- ITV 1 Tyne Tees HD
- ITV 1 Wales HD
- ITV 1 Westcountry South West HD
- ITV 1 Westcountry West HD
- ITV 2 HD

Tp114 11.386 GHz V 27500 2/3 DVB-S2:

- ITV 1 Anglia East HD
- ITV 1 Border England HD
- ITV 1 London HD
- ITV 1 Yorkshire East HD
- ITV 4 HD
- ITV Be HD
- STV West HD
- UTV HD

Tp115 11.426 GHz H 27500 2/3 (encrypted in Conax):

- The Racing Partnership HD

Tp116 11.426 GHz V 29500 8/9 DVB-S2: France 24 English HD S4C S4C HD TJC HD TNT Sports 10 HD (encrypted in VideoGuard)

Tp24 12.168 GHz V 275000 2/3 DVB-S2:

- BBC One South HD

Tp34 12.363 GHz V 27500 2/3 DVB-S2 (encrypted in VideoGuard):

- Channel 4 Scotland (unencrypted)
- Channel 4 South & East (unencrypted)
- Nickelodeon UK HD
- RTÉ 2 HD
- Sky Sci-Fi HD
- TG 4 HD
- U&Alibi UK HD
- U&Gold UK HD
- Virgin Media Four HD

European Beam

Tp3 11.758 GHz H 27500 2/3 DVB-S2 (encrypted in VideoGuard):

- Channel 4 Ireland HD
- Cúla 4 HD
- Sky Documentaries UK HD
- Sky Crime Ireland HD
- Sky Sports Box Office HD
- Sky Sports Golf Ireland HD
- TNT Sports Box Office HD
- TNT Sports Box Office 2 HD
- Utsav Gold HD
- U&W UK HD

Tp8 11.856 GHz V 27500 2/3 DVB-S2 (encrypted in VideoGuard):

- E4 UK HD
- Eurosport 1 UK HD
- Eurosport 2 UK HD
- Sky Showcase Ireland
- Sky Kids HD
- Sky Sports+
- Sky Sports Main Event Ireland HD
- Virgin Media One HD
- Virgin Media Two HD

Tp12 11.934 GHz V 27500 5/6 (encrypted in VideoGuard):

- Premier Greyhound Racing
- Sky Cinema Action
- Sky Cinema Family
- Sky Cinema Greats
- Sky Cinema Premiere
- Sky News UK (unencrypted)
- Sky Max UK
- Sky Showcase UK
- Sky Sports+
- Sky Sports Cricket
- Sky Sports F1
- Sky Sports Football UK
- Sky Sports Golf UK
- Sky Sports Main Event UK
- Sky Sports Mix
- Sky Sports News UK
- Sky Sports NFL
- Sky Sports Premier League UK

Tp16 12.012 GHz V 27500 2/3 DVB-S2 (encrypted in VideoGuard):

- Sky History 2 HD
- Sky Nature UK HD
- Sky News UK HD
- Sky Showcase UK HD
- Sky Sports Football UK HD
- Sky Sports Golf UK HD
- Sky Sports Main Event UK HD
- Sky Sports News UK HD
- Sky Sports Premier League Ireland HD

Tp20 12.090 GHz V 29500 8/9 DVB-S2 (encrypted in VideoGuard):

- Challenge Ireland (unencrypted)
- Eurosport 1 UK
- Eurosport 2 UK
- National Geographic UK [also +1hr]
- Sky Atlantic Ireland
- Sky Atlantic UK [also +1hr]
- Sky Comedy Ireland
- Sky Crime UK [also +1hr]
- Sky Max Ireland
- Sky News Arabia (unencrypted)
- Sky News Ireland (unencrypted)
- Sky Showcase Ireland
- Sky Sports Football Ireland
- Sky Sports Golf Ireland
- Sky Sports Main Event Ireland
- Sky Sports News Ireland
- Sky Sports Premier League Ireland
- Sky Sports Tennis Ireland
- Sky Witness Ireland
- Sky Witness UK +1hr

== See also ==
- 2013 in spaceflight
- SES (satellite operator)
- Astra (satellite family)
- Astra 28.2°E (orbital position)
- Astra 2F (co-located satellite)
- Astra 2G (co-located satellite)
