= Astra 1KR =

Communications satellite

- Mission type: Communications
- Operator: SES
- COSPAR ID: 2006-012A
- SATCAT no.: 29055
- Website: https://www.ses.com/
- Mission duration: 15 years (planned); 19 years, 11 months, 4 days (elapsed)

Spacecraft properties
- Spacecraft type: Lockheed Martin A2100
- Bus: A2100AXS
- Manufacturer: Lockheed Martin Commercial Space Systems
- Launch mass: 4,332 kg (9,550 lb)

Start of mission
- Launch date: 20 April 2006, 20:27:00 UTC
- Rocket: Atlas V 411 (s/n AV-008)
- Launch site: Cape Canaveral, SLC-41
- Entered service: June 2006

Orbital parameters
- Reference system: Geocentric orbit
- Regime: Geostationary orbit
- Longitude: 19.2° East

Transponders
- Band: 32 Ku-band
- Bandwidth: 26 MHz
- Coverage area: Europe

Astra 1KR is one of the Astra geostationary satellites owned and operated by SES, was purchased in June 2003. It was launched on 20 April 2006, 20:27:00 UTC as a replacement for Astra 1K, which failed to reach orbit on launch in November 2002. The launch of Astra 1KR was the first attempted by SES since the Astra 1K failure.

The satellite launched to 3.4° East for testing, before moving to Astra 19.2°E, where it replaced Astra 1B, which was effectively decommissioned, and Astra 1C, which was then elderly and running beneath full capacity. It was expected to also replace Astra 2C, which was under-utilised, and to allow that satellite to return to Astra 28.2°E to join Astra 2A / 2B / 2D to provide additional capacity. However, SES stated that Astra 1L would replace Astra 2C.

The first signals from the satellite at 19.2° East were direct replacements for four transponders on Astra 1B which had reached end-of-life and Astra 1C which was moved to 4.6° East.

Starting in February 2025, following Astra 1P's launch (June 2024) and start of service at 19.2° East (January 2025), all broadcast channels were moved off Astra 1KR to Astra 1P, in preparation for Astra 1KR's retirement.

== See also ==
- SES
- Astra
- Astra 19.2°E
- Astra 1K
- Astra 1B
- Astra 1C
- Astra 2C
- Astra 1E
