= Astra 1P =

Geostationary communications satellite

- Names: Astra 1P (2024- ) SES-24 (2024- )
- Mission type: Communications
- Operator: SES
- COSPAR ID: 2024-115A
- SATCAT no.: 60086
- Website: https://www.ses.com/

Spacecraft properties
- Spacecraft type: Spacebus
- Bus: Spacebus NEO-200
- Manufacturer: Thales Alenia Space
- Launch mass: ~5000 kg

Start of mission
- Launch date: 20 June 2024
- Rocket: Falcon 9 Block 5
- Launch site: Cape Canaveral
- Contractor: SpaceX

Orbital parameters
- Reference system: Geocentric orbit
- Regime: Geostationary orbit
- Longitude: 9.5°W (2024 testing); 19.2°E (2025-)

Transponders
- Band: 80 Ku-band
- Coverage area: Europe

Astra 1P (also known as SES-24) is an Astra communications satellite, built by Thales Alenia Space for owner/operator SES. Launched by SpaceX on 20 June 2024, the satellite is positioned in geostationary orbit, in SES's primary European broadcasting slot at 19.2° East, to provide broadcast TV to Europe and is the most powerful satellite at that position.

== Satellite description ==
Designed and built by Thales Alenia Space, Astra 1P is a classic wide-beam broadcasting satellite based on the all-electric Spacebus NEO-200 satellite bus. The satellite has 80 physical Ku-band transponders with bandwidth filters, capable of broadcasting up to 500 HDTV channels. It has a dry mass of 3,780kg (5,000kg at launch, fueled) and two solar array 'wings', each of six panels providing 25kW.

== Broadcasting reach ==
Astra 1P is a third generation satellite at SES's original orbital position of 19.2° East to provide continued free-to-air and pay-TV direct-to-home broadcasting services to all of Europe, with an identical coverage and frequency plan to the second generation of satellites at this orbital position that were reaching the end of their operational life at the time of its launch.In particular, the satellite serves private and public broadcasters in the following regions of Europe:

- German-speaking: SES delivers content to 42 million TV households in Germany, Austria and Switzerland via satellite, cable, and IPTV. Broadcasters include High View, ORF, ProSiebenSat.1, QVC Germany, ZDF, and the HD+ high-definition satellite TV platform.
- France: satellites at 19.2° East serve 17.5 million homes with major TV platforms including CANAL+ and Orange.
- Spain: Astra 19.2° East provides 7.5 million TV households with free-to-air (FTA) international TV channels and Telefonica's Movistar Plus+ TV platform.

In addition, Astra 19.2° East is the home of the ASTRA 1 Sports satellite distribution platform delivering sports coverage, major events and significant breaking news to millions of TV households in Europe, the Middle East and North Africa.

== History ==
In November 2021, SES ordered two replacement satellites from Thales Alenia Space, a joint venture between Thales (67%) and Leonardo (33%). Astra 1P and Astra 1Q were to be launched in 2024 to the 19.2°E orbital slot to take over from the Astra 1KR, Astra 1L, Astra 1M, and Astra 1N satellites positioned there (all launched 10–15 years previously, with the older two at the end of their planned life). The new satellites would provide direct-to-home broadcast TV to Europe (especially Germany, France and Spain) and high-throughput data traffic well into the 2040s.

In May 2024, the completed satellite produced at the Cannes Mandelieu Space Center in France, arrived in Florida for launch from Cape Canaveral

In June 2024, the launch of Astra 1P by SpaceX, originally scheduled for 17 June, was delayed twice by unfavourable weather conditions at the Cape Canaveral launch site.

On 20 June 2024, Astra 1P was successfully launched from Cape Canaveral on a Falcon 9 Block 5 rocket, the first Astra satellite to be launched by SpaceX.

For the second half of 2024, using its all-electric thrusters, Astra 1P took several months to reach geostationary orbit.

In December 2024 the satellite completed testing at 9.5° West and was then moved to 19.2° East to begin service in January 2025.

Starting in February 2025, all broadcast channels were moved off Astra 1KR and Astra 1L to Astra 1P in preparation for the older satellites' retirement, and Astra 1L was moved from the 19.2°E orbital slot to 19.4° East in March 2025.

== See also ==
- Astra 19.2°E orbital position
- SES satellite operator
- Astra satellite family
