= Astra 2B =

Communications satellite

- Mission type: Communications
- Operator: SES
- COSPAR ID: 2000-054A
- SATCAT no.: 26494
- Website: https://www.ses.com
- Mission duration: Planned: 15 years Final: <20 years and 9 months

Spacecraft properties
- Spacecraft type: Eurostar
- Bus: Eurostar E2000+
- Manufacturer: Astrium (now Airbus Defence and Space)
- Launch mass: 3,315 kg (7,308 lb)
- Power: 7.8 kW

Start of mission
- Launch date: 14 September 2000, 22:44:47 UTC
- Rocket: Ariane 5G (V130)
- Launch site: Centre Spatial Guyanais, ELA-3
- Contractor: Arianespace
- Entered service: November 2000

End of mission
- Disposal: Graveyard orbit
- Deactivated: June 2021

Orbital parameters
- Reference system: Geocentric orbit
- Regime: Geostationary orbit
- Longitude: Astra 28.2°E (2000-2013); Astra 19.2°E (2013-2014); Astra 31.5°E (2014-2016); Astra 19.2°E (2016-2017); 20° West (2017-2018); Astra 19.2°E (2018-2021)

Transponders
- Band: 30 Ku-band
- Bandwidth: 33 MHz
- Coverage area: Europe, Middle East, Africa

Astra 2B is an Astra communications satellite, owned and operated by SES. Launched in September 2000 to join Astra 2A at the Astra 28.2°E orbital position providing digital television and radio broadcast services to the United Kingdom and Ireland, the satellite has also served at the Astra 19.2°E and the Astra 31.5°E positions.

== History ==
The satellite provides two broadcast beams, each with horizontal and vertical polarisation, across two footprints - 2B North (covering Central Europe and Scandinavia) and 2B South (covering Central Europe and the Iberian Peninsula and Canary Islands).

While at 28.2° East, television signals could be received with a 43 cm dish across the majority of the British Isles with a 60 cm dish required in the extreme north and west, although the official footprint maps now show a 60 cm dish as required across all of Western Europe. At 28.2° East, 17 transponders on Astra 2B were used by BSkyB to provide the Sky Digital television services of standard and high-definition television (HDTV) and digital radio. Astra 2B could also provide backup capacity, substituting for one or more transponders across the whole 10.70-12.75 GHz range used by Astra satellites in the Astra 19.2°E and Astra 28.2°E orbital positions. A third, steerable beam provides 8 transponders in the 12.50-12.75 GHz range for Internet and telecommunications services in West Africa. This aspect of the satellite was originally the commercial responsibility of SES New Skies (now incorporated into SES).

Following the launch of Astra 2F to 28.2° East, in February 2013, Astra 2B started its planned move from that position to Astra 19.2°E, to serve alongside Astra 1KR, Astra 1L, Astra 1M, and Astra 2C, arriving in position by 27 February 2013. In January 2014, Astra 2B moved to the Astra 31.5°E orbital position, pending the delayed launch of Astra 5B to that position and stayed there as back-up until it was moved back to 19.2° East in December 2016. In June 2017, it was moved west at approximately 0.6°/day to arrive alongside NSS-7 at 20° West in August 2017. From April 2018 to July 2018, Astra 2B was moved east at 0.6°/day to Astra 19.2°E. Since June 2021, Astra 2B has been non-operational and moving west at approximately 4.9°/day.

== See also ==
- Astra 19.2°E previous orbital position
- Astra 31.5°E previous orbital position
- Astra 28.2°E previous orbital position
- Astra 2A
- Astra 2C
- Astra 2D
- Astra 2E
- Astra 2F
- Astra 2G
- SES (operator)
- Astra satellite family
