= Astra 2F =

Communications satellite

- Names: Eutelsat 28F
- Mission type: Communications
- Operator: SES S.A.
- COSPAR ID: 2012-051A
- SATCAT no.: 38778
- Website: https://www.ses.com/
- Mission duration: 15 years (planned); 13 years, 1 month, 5 days (elapsed)

Spacecraft properties
- Spacecraft type: Eurostar
- Bus: Eurostar-3000
- Manufacturer: Astrium (now Airbus Defence and Space)
- Launch mass: 5,968 kg (13,157 lb)

Start of mission
- Launch date: 28 September 2012, 21:18:07 UTC
- Rocket: Ariane 5ECA (VA209)
- Launch site: Centre Spatial Guyanais, ELA-3
- Contractor: Arianespace
- Entered service: 21 November 2012

Orbital parameters
- Reference system: Geocentric orbit
- Regime: Geostationary orbit
- Longitude: 28.2° East

Transponders
- Band: 63 transponders: 60 Ku-band; 3 Ka-band
- Coverage area: Europe

Astra 2F is one of the Astra communications satellites owned and operated by SES S.A., launched in September 2012 to the Astra 28.2°E orbital position. The satellite provides free-to-air and encrypted direct-to-home (DTH) digital television and satellite broadband services for Europe and Africa.

Astra 2F is the first of three "second generation" satellites for the 28.2° East position which replace the first generation Astra 2A, Astra 2B and Astra 2D satellites previously positioned there. The second, Astra 2E, was launched in 2013 and the third, Astra 2G, was launched in 2014. Some parts of the construction of Astra 2F by Astrium (now Airbus Defence and Space) in Stevenage, United Kingdom could be seen in the BBC2 documentary programme, How To Build... A Satellite broadcast on 27 November 2011.

Astra 2F was successfully launched from Kourou in French Guiana on 28 September 2012, at 21:18:07 UTC by an Ariane 5ECA launch vehicle from Centre Spatial Guyanais. and underwent in-orbit testing at 43.5° East. Commercial operations at 28.2° East began on 21 November 2012.

== Market ==
The Astra 28.2° East orbital position was established in 1998 to provide digital television, digital radio and multimedia services to the United Kingdom and Ireland, and Astra 2F's primary mission is to continue this provision as replacement and follow-on capacity to the Astra 2A, Astra 2B, Astra 2D and Astra 1N satellites, delivering programming to almost 13 million satellite homes, over 3 million cable homes, and 700,000 Internet Protocol television (IPTV) homes in the United Kingdom and Ireland, in particular for channels from the major UK digital satellite television satellite bus, BSkyB and Freesat.

In addition, Astra 2F serves the growing direct-to-home (DTH) platforms in West Africa such as Multi TV of Ghana.

Astra 2F is also designed to provide SES Broadband’s first commercial Ka-band satellite broadband service in Europe, with a Ka-band payload delivering high-speed Internet access (at download speeds up to 20 Mbit/s) along with Voice over Internet Protocol (VoIP), and Internet Protocol television (IPTV) from November 2012.

== Broadcasting footprint ==
Astra 2F has three Ku-band downlink beams covering Europe and Africa. The Europe Beam is centred on the English Channel with maximum signal (for reception on a 40 cm dish) over the United Kingdom, Ireland, France, Benelux, and parts of Germany, Austria, and Spain (including a "lobe" specifically designed to serve the Canary Islands which officially requires a 120 cm dish but in practise is easily receivable using a 90 cm dish as with Astra 2E), and reception on a 1 m dish extending to North Africa, Poland and the Balkans.

The UK Beam provides maximum signal (40 cm dishes) over the United Kingdom, Ireland, Benelux and Northern France in close approximation of the UK Beam of Astra 2D, which it replaces. Due to the tight footprint, some reception issues for UK channels are being reported in Spain as of December 2012. Early reports of test transmissions on 11.023 GHz H 23000 DVB-S2 suggest the beam is very tight with a very sharp fall off to the west and east of the footprint, but eastern Spain seems to be getting a higher signal strength possibly due to the off-axis beam as 28.2° East on the geostationary arc is not directly in line with the United Kingdom but offset to the east.

The West Africa beam provides for reception with 60 cm dishes across southern West Africa from Senegal to Nigeria, with a lower signal level (80 cm dishes) extending across the Democratic Republic of the Congo.

The Ka-band footprint for satellite broadband provides full service coverage across western Europe from the United Kingdom and France in the west to the Czech Republic, Austria, Croatia and Bosnia and Herzegovina in the east.

== Active transponders ==
Below is a list of the TV channels broadcast to Europe from active transponders on Astra 2F as of April 2025:

In the list, channels broadcast with a one-hour delay are shown Channel +1hr. Where both the original and the delayed channel are broadcast from the same transponder, this is shown in one entry as Channel [also +1hr].

UK Beam
Tp109 11.306 GHz H 27500 2/3:

- 5 Action
- 5 Select
- 5 Star [also +1hr]
- 5 USA [also +1hr]
- Channel 5 [also +1hr]
- Channel 5 HD
- Nick Jr Too UK (encrypted in VideoGuard)
- Nickelodeon UK (encrypted in VideoGuard)

Tp110 11.306 GHz V 27500 5/6:

- Great! Action [also +1hr]
- Great! Movies Ireland
- Great! Movies UK [also +1hr]
- Great! Romance UK [also +1hr]
- Great! TV Ireland
- Great! TV UK [also +1hr]
- Pop [also +1hr]
- Tiny Pop [also +1hr]

Tp111 11.344 GHz H 27500 2/3 DVB-S2:

- ITV 1 Anglia West HD
- ITV 1 Border Scotland HD
- ITV 1 Central East HD
- ITV 1 Meridian East HD
- ITV 1 Meridian South Coast HD
- ITV 1 Meridian Thames Valley HD
- ITV 1 Yorkshire West HD
- ITV 3 HD

Tp112 11.344 GHz V 27500 2/3 DVB-S2:

- ITV 1 Central West +1hr
- ITV 1 Granada +1hr
- ITV 1 London +1hr
- ITV 1 Meridian East +1hr
- ITV 2 +1hr
- ITV 3 +1hr
- ITV 4 +1hr
- Legend
- Legend Xtra [also +1hr]
- PBS America
- STV East
- STV Tayside
- Talking Pictures TV
- That's Melody
- That's Oldies
- That's TV UK
- That's TV2
- That's TV3
- True Crime Ireland
- True Crime UK [also +1hr]
- True Crime Xtra Ireland
- True Crime Xtra UK

European Beam
Tp21 12.110 GHz H 27500 2/3 DVB-S2 (encrypted in VideoGuard):

- Sky Comedy UK HD
- Sky Crime UK HD
- Sky News Ireland HD
- Sky Sports Action HD
- Sky Sports Cricket HD
- Sky Sports F1 HD
- Sky Sports Mix HD
- Sky Sports News Ireland HD
- STV Tayside HD

Tp22 12.129 GHz V 27500 2/3 DVB-S2:

- U&Alibi Ireland (encrypted in VideoGuard)
- U&Alibi Ireland HD (encrypted in VideoGuard)
- U&Alibi UK [also +1hr] (encrypted in VideoGuard)
- U&Gold Ireland (encrypted in VideoGuard)
- U&Gold UK [also +1hr] (encrypted in VideoGuard)
- U&Dave Ireland
- U&Dave Ireland HD (encrypted in VideoGuard
- U&Dave UK
- U&DaveJaVu
- U&Drama Ireland
- U&Drama UK [also +1hr]
- U&Eden [also +1hr]
- U&W Ireland
- U&W UK [also +1hr]
- U&Yesterday [also +1hr]

Tp23 12.148 GHz H 27500 2/3 DVB-S2 (encrypted in VideoGuard):

- Baby TV Europe
- Challenge UK (unencrypted)
- Colors Gujarati
- Movies 24
- Movies 24+
- National Geographic Wild UK
- Oireachtas TV
- RTÉ 2 +1hr
- RTÉ One +1hr
- RTÉ Jr
- RTÉ News
- Sky Arts Ireland (unencrypted)
- Sky Arts UK (unencrypted)
- Sky Comedy UK
- Sky Crime Ireland
- Sky Documentaries Ireland
- Sky Documentaries UK
- Sky Nature Ireland
- Sky Nature UK
- Sky Replay Ireland
- Sky Replay UK
- Sky Sci-Fi
- Sky Showcase UK +1hr
- Sky Witness UK
- Together TV (unencrypted)
- Virgin Media One +1hr
- Virgin Media Three

Tp24 12.168 GHz V 27500 2/3 DVB-S2:

- BBC One South HD
- Boomerang UK HD (encrypted in VideoGuard)
- Cartoon Network UK HD (encrypted in VideoGuard)
- Channel 4 Midlands HD
- Channel 4 North HD
- CNBC UK HD
- Sky Mix Ireland HD
- Sky Mix UK HD
- Sky Witness Ireland HD (encrypted in VideoGuard)
- STV North HD

Tp25 12.188 GHz H 27500 2/3 DVB-S2 (encrypted in VideoGuard):

- LFC TV HD
- Premier Sports 1 HD
- Premier Sports 2 HD
- Sky Arts UK HD
- Sky Atlantic UK HD
- Sky Max UK HD
- Sky Sports Racing HD
- Sky Sports Tennis UK HD
- Sky Witness UK HD

Tp26 12.207 GHz V 27500 2/3 DVB-S2 (encrypted in VideoGuard):

- Sky Sports Main Event UK 4K
- TNT Sport Ultimate 4K

Tp27 12.226 GHz H 27500 2/3 DVB-S2 (encrypted in VideoGuard):

- Channel 4 Northern Ireland HD (unencrypted)
- E4 UK HD
- National Geographic UK HD
- National Geographic Wild UK HD
- RTÉ One HD
- SET Asia HD
- Sky Mix UK HD (unencrypted)
- Utsav Plus HD

Tp28 12.246 GHz V 27500 2/3 DVB-S2 (encrypted in VideoGuard):

- Sky UHD 1 4K
- Sky UHD 2 4K

Tp29 12.266 GHz H 27500 2/3 DVB-S2 (encrypted in VideoGuard):

- Discovery Channel UK HD
- Film 4 UK HD
- More 4 UK HD
- MUTV HD
- Sky Sports Main Event in Pubs HD
- Sky Sports News in Pubs HD
- Sky Sports Premier League UK HD
- STV North HD
- U&Dave UK HD

Tp30 12.285 GHz V 27500 2/3 DVB-S2 (encrypted in VideoGuard):

- Sky Cinema Action HD
- Sky Cinema Animation HD
- Sky Cinema Comedy HD
- Sky Cinema Drama HD
- Sky Cinema Family HD
- Sky Cinema Greats HD
- Sky Cinema Hits HD
- Sky Cinema Premiere HD
- Sky Cinema Sci-fi Horror HD
- Sky Cinema Select HD
- Sky Cinema Thriller HD

Tp32 12.324 GHz V 27500 2/3 DVB-S2 (encrypted in VideoGuard):

- Sky Intro HD (unencrypted)
- Sky Sports F1 HD
- Sony Max UK HD

Tp35 12.382 GHz H 29500 2/3 DVB-S2:

- Animal Planet UK (encrypted in VideoGuard)
- Discovery Channel UK (encrypted in VideoGuard)
- Discovery History (encrypted in VideoGuard)
- Discovery Science UK (encrypted in VideoGuard)
- Discovery Turbo UK (encrypted in VideoGuard)
- DMAX UK [also +1hr]
- Food Network UK [also +1hr]
- HGTV UK
- Really UK
- Quest Ireland HD
- Quest UK HD
- Quest UK [also +1hr]
- Quest Red [also +1hr]
- TLC UK (encrypted in VideoGuard)

== See also ==
- 2012 in spaceflight
- SES satellite operator
- Astra satellite family
- Astra 28.2°E orbital position
- Astra 2E co-located satellite
- Astra 2G co-located satellite
