= E3000 =

E3000 may refer to:

- Eurostar E3000, a satellite platform manufactured by Airbus
- A variant of the HP 3000, a minicomputer line manufactured by Hewlett-Packard
