= Astra 2G =

Communications satellite for Europe and Africa

- Names: Eutelsat 28G
- Mission type: Communications
- Operator: SES
- COSPAR ID: 2014-089A
- SATCAT no.: 40364
- Website: https://www.ses.com/
- Mission duration: 15 years (planned); 10 years, 10 months, 28 days (elapsed)

Spacecraft properties
- Spacecraft type: Eurostar
- Bus: Eurostar-3000
- Manufacturer: Astrium (now Airbus Defence and Space)
- Launch mass: 6,020 kg (13,270 lb)

Start of mission
- Launch date: 27 December 2014, 21:37:49 UTC
- Rocket: Proton-M / Briz-M
- Launch site: Baikonur, Site 200/39
- Contractor: Khrunichev State Research and Production Space Center
- Entered service: June 2015

Orbital parameters
- Reference system: Geocentric orbit
- Regime: Geostationary orbit
- Longitude: 28.2° East

Transponders
- Band: 66 transponders: 62 Ku-band; 1 Ka-band
- Bandwidth: 250 / 500 / 600 MHz
- Coverage area: Europe

Astra 2G is one of the Astra communications satellites owned and operated by SES, launched to the Astra 28.2°E orbital position on 27 December 2014, at 21:37:49 UTC from Baikonur Cosmodrome.

Astra 2G is positioned at 28.5° East (part of the Astra 28.2°E orbital position) and is the last of three "second generation" satellites launched to this position to replace the first generation Astra 2A, Astra 2B, Astra 2C and Astra 2D satellites originally positioned there between 1998 and 2001, and it joined Astra 2E and Astra 2F launched in 2013 and 2012, respectively.

== Market ==
Astra 2G carries both Ku-band and Ka-band payloads and will deliver broadcast, VSAT and broadband services to Europe, the Middle East and Africa, and will also provide the ability to connect West Africa to Europe via Ka-band. The Astra 28.2° East position was established in 1998 to provide digital television, digital radio and multimedia services to the United Kingdom and Ireland, and a major part of Astra 2G's mission is to continue, extend and backup this provision. Along with Astra 2E and Astra 2F it will deliver programming to almost 13 million satellite homes, over 3 million cable homes, and 700,000 Internet Protocol television (IPTV_ homes in the United Kingdom and Ireland, in particular for channels from the major United Kingdom digital satellite television platforms, BSkyB and Freesat.

Astra 2G also supports SATMED, a satellite-based e-health platform developed by SES and supported by the Luxembourg Government and the Ministry for Cooperation and Humanitarian Action which enables communication between doctors, enabling the transfer and exchange of medical knowledge and supporting tools for medical e-learning and e-teaching to improve public health in emerging and developing countries, particularly in isolated areas.

Following ITV's HD channels moving to transponders on Astra 2E and Astra 2F in September 2024, and Channel 4 London HD moving to Astra 2E in November 2024, there is now (as of December 2024) only one active transponder on Astra 2G using the UK spotbeam, which is 11023 H.

== Broadcasting footprints ==
Astra 2G has three Ku-band downlink beams and one Ka-band beam:

- The European beam is centred on the Benelux countries with reception from a 60 cm (24 in) dish available across most of Europe - west to the Portuguese eastern border, east to Belarus, north to Estonia and south to coast of North Africa.
- The UK beam provides maximum signal (for reception with 45 cm (18 in) dishes) over the whole United Kingdom, Ireland, Benelux and northern France with a sharp roll-off of signal level outside this region, in close approximation of the UK beam of Astra 2D. This enables channels to be broadcast free-to-air but with reception effectively constrained to the British Isles, and has been the basis for the Freesat free-to-air United Kingdom platform. As of December 2024, there is only one transponder on Astra 2G that broadcasts using the UK beam (11023 H), with all others moving to either Astra 2E or Astra 2F.
- The strongest signals of the West Africa beam (receivable on 50 cm (20 in) dishes) covers Côte d'Ivoire, Burkina Faso, Ghana, Togo, Benin, Nigeria and northern Cameroon, with additional "lobes" for parts of Gabon and Congo. Reception on larger dishes is available across the entire sub-Saharan west Africa region.
- The Ka-band footprint is centred on France with coverage over all of western Europe.

== History ==
The launch of Astra 2G was intended to be from the Baikonur Cosmodrome by International Launch Services (ILS) Proton-M launch vehicle a month earlier, on 28 November 2014 but technical problems with the launch vehicle caused it to be rolled back from the launch pad to undergo a component replacement. The satellite had arrived at Baikonur on 29 October 2014 after a delayed flight from Europe - an emergency landing of the transport aircraft in the city of Ulyanovsk due to engine trouble required replacement of the aircraft's engine and a two-day delay.

Finally launched successfully on 27 December 2014, at 21:37:49 UTC, the satellite was initially positioned at 21.0° East for three months and then tested at 43.5° East, before moving to the Astra 28.2° East position in June 2015.

On 18 June 2015, the first six channels, including ITV and Channel 4, began broadcasting from Astra 2G, transferred from Astra 2E, Astra 2F and, in particular from Eutelsat 28A, which was some two years beyond its expected end-of-life and operating with some transponders considerably under power. The final Eutelsat 28A channels, including the Freesat EPG data channel, transferred to Astra 2G on 29 June 2015.

== Active transponders ==
Below is a list of the television channels broadcast to the UK and Ireland from active transponders on Astra 2G as of May 2025:

In the list, channels broadcast with a one-hour delay are shown as Channel +1hr. Where both the original and the delayed channel are broadcast from the same transponder, this is shown in one entry as Channel [also +1hr].

UK Beam
Tp61 11.023 GHz H 23000 3/4 DVB-S2:

- BBC One Wales HD
- BBC One West Midlands HD
- BBC One Scotland HD
- BBC News HD
- BBC Alba HD

European Beam
Tp62 11.038 GHz V 23000 2/3 DVB-S2 (encrypted in VideoGuard):

- Animal Planet UK +1hr
- Discovery Channel Ireland
- Discovery Channel UK +1hr
- Discovery History +1hr
- Discovery Science UK +1hr
- Discovery Turbo UK +1hr
- DMAX Ireland (unencrypted)
- HGTV Ireland (unencrypted)
- Investigation Discovery Ireland
- Investigation Discovery UK [also +1hr]
- Quest Red Ireland (unencrypted)
- TLC Ireland
- TLC UK [also +1hr]

Tp65 11.082 GHz H 23000 2/3 DVB-S2:

- ARY QTV UK
- Blaze Ireland
- Blaze UK
- Clubland
- Crime + Investigation Ireland (encrypted in VideoGuard)
- Crime + Investigation UK [also +1hr] (encrypted in VideoGuard)
- Faith UK
- Gems TV
- Geo UK
- Geo News International
- India Today UK
- Now 70s
- Now 80s
- Now 90s & 00s
- Now Rock
- Rewind TV
- Sikh Channel
- Sky History (encrypted in VideoGuard)
- Sky History 2 (encrypted in VideoGuard)
- Sky History Ireland (encrypted in VideoGuard)
- Zee Cinema UK (encrypted in VideoGuard)
- Zee Punjabi UK (encrypted in VideoGuard)
- Zee TV UK (encrypted in VideoGuard)

Tp67 11.112 GHz H 23000 2/3 DVB-S2:

- Crime + Investigation UK HD (encrypted in VideoGuard)
- Ideal World HD
- Must Have Ideas HD
- Sewing Street HD
- HobbyMaker HD
- Gem Collector HD
- Primal Living HD
- Sky History UK HD (encrypted in VideoGuard)
- Zee TV UK HD (encrypted in VideoGuard)
- Sky Sports Racing Ireland (encrypted in VideoGuard)

Tp69 11.141 GHz H 23000 2/3 DVB-S2 (encrypted in VideoGuard):

- Club MTV UK
- Comedy Central Ireland
- Comedy Central Extra Ireland
- Comedy Central UK [also +1hr]
- MTV Music UK
- Nick Jr Ireland
- Nick Jr Too Ireland
- Nick Jr UK [also +1hr]
- Nickelodeon Ireland
- Nickelodeon UK +1hr
- NickToons Ireland

Tp105 11.224 GHz H 27500 2/3:

- Aastha UK
- Adult Channel (encrypted in VideoGuard)
- Arise News
- Colors Cineplex (encrypted in VideoGuard)
- Colors Rishtey Europe (encrypted in VideoGuard)
- Cruise 1st TV
- EuroNews English
- NTV Europe
- PTC Punjabi
- Sanskar TV
- TV One
- Utsav Bharat (encrypted in VideoGuard)

Tp106 11.224 GHz V 23000 2/3 DVB-S2:

- Arirang World HD
- Great! Romance Ireland
- Iqra Bangla
- Iqra TV
- Islam TV
- MTA 1 World HD
- NHK World Japan HD

Tp107 11.264 GHz H 27500 2/3 (encrypted in VideoGuard):

- Boomerang UK [also +1hr]
- Cartoon Network UK [also +1hr]
- Cartoonito UK
- Film 4 Ireland
- Channel 4 Ireland +1hr
- E4 Ireland [also +1hr]
- More4 Ireland

Tp108 11.264 GHz V 27500 2/3:

- Akaal Channel UK
- Dunamis TV
- EWTN
- Islam Channel
- Islam Channel Urdu
- Racing TV (encrypted in VideoGuard)
- TBN UK

Tp91 11.494 GHz H 22000 5/6:

- Channels 24
- Music India
- QVC Beauty
- QVC Extra
- QVC Style UK HD
- QVC UK HD
- Travelxp

Tp92 11.509 GHz V 23000 2/3 DVB-S2:

- Aljazeera English HD
- ATN Bangla UK
- Ion TV
- Racing TV UK HD (encrypted in VideoGuard)
- TRT World HD
- Colors UK HD (encrypted in VideoGuard)

Tp93 11.523 GHz H 23000 2/3 DVB-S2:

- Ahlebait TV Networks
- Panjab TV
- Pitaara International
- Politics Punjab TV
- Xpanded TV

Tp95 11.553 GHz H 23000 2/3 DVB-S2:

- ARY Digital UK
- ARY World
- Channel S
- Deen TV
- High Street TV2
- High Street TV3
- Hum Masala UK
- Hum TV Europe
- Kanshi TV
- MATV Channel
- NDTV World
- Noor TV
- NTD
- SBN International

Tp96 11.568 GHz V 22000 5/6:

- Aaj Tak UK
- Best Direct
- Court TV UK
- Faith World TV
- High Street TV1
- JewelleryMaker
- Primal Living
- SET Asia (encrypted in VideoGuard)
- Sony Max UK (encrypted in VideoGuard)
- Sony Max2 (encrypted in VideoGuard)
- Sony SAB TV Asia (encrypted in VideoGuard)
- Takbeer TV
- That's Pride
- TV Warehouse

Tp97 11.582 GHz H 23000 2/3 DVB-S2 (encrypted in VideoGuard):

- TNT Sports 1-5
- TNT Sports Box Office in Pubs
- TNT Sports Box Office 2 in Pubs

Tp98 11.597 GHz V 22000 5/6 (encrypted in VideoGuard):

- TNT Sports 2, 4-10
- Food Network Ireland
- HGTV UK +1hr
- Really Ireland

Tp99 11.612 GHz H 22000 5/6 (encrypted in VideoGuard):

- TNT Sports 1, 3
- TNT Sports mosaic

Tp100 11.627 GHz V 22000 5/6 (encrypted in VideoGuard):

- Comedy Central UK HD
- Comedy Central Extra UK
- MTV 80s
- MTV 90s
- MTV Ireland
- MTV UK
- MTV UK HD
- Nick Jr UK HD
- NickToons UK

Tp101 11.641 GHz H 23000 2/3 DVB-S2:

- Eman Channel
- Phoenix CNE HD
- WION HD

Tp102 11.656 GHz V 22000 5/6:

- B4U Movies UK (encrypted in VideoGuard)
- B4U Music UK (encrypted in VideoGuard)
- Colors UK (encrypted in VideoGuard)
- God TV UK
- Islam Channel Bangla
- London Live (encrypted in VideoGuard)
- Madani Channel English
- Panjab Broadcasting Channel
- Revelation TV
- Sangat TV
- TRT World
- TVC News
- Utsav Gold (encrypted in VideoGuard)
- Utsav Plus (encrypted in VideoGuard)

Tp103 11.671 GHz H 23000 2/3 DVB-S2:

- Bloomberg TV UK HD
- CNN International Europe HD
- GB News HD
- Loveworld TV HD
- Premier Sports 1 UK HD (encrypted in VideoGuard)

Tp104 11.686 GHz V 23000 2/3 DVB-S2:

- Daystar TV HD
- TNT Sports 1, 3 UK (encrypted in VideoGuard)
- TNT Sports 1 Ireland (encrypted in VideoGuard)

== See also ==
- 2014 in spaceflight
- SES (satellite operator)
- Astra (satellite family)
- Astra 28.2°E orbital position
- Astra 2E (co-located satellite)
- Astra 2F (co-located satellite)
