= Astra 28.2°E =

Group of communications satellites

Astra 28.2°E is the name for the group of Astra communications satellites co-located at the 28.2° East position in the Clarke Belt that are owned and operated by SES based in Betzdorf, Luxembourg. It is one of the major TV satellite positions serving Europe (the others being at 19.2° East, 13° East, 23.5° East, and 5° East).

The Astra satellites at 28.2° East provide for services downlinking in the 10.70–12.70 GHz range of the K_{u} band.

== Satellite craft in use ==
=== Current ===
- Astra 2E (launched in 2013)
- Astra 2F (launched in 2012)
- Astra 2G (launched in 2014)

=== Previous ===
- Astra 1D (retired, launched in 1994)
- Astra 1N (launched in 2011)
- Astra 2A (retired, launched in 1998)
- Astra 2B (retired, launched in 2000)
- Astra 2C (retired, launched in 2001)
- Astra 2D (retired, launched in 2000)
- Eutelsat 28A, also known as Eurobird 1 (launched in 2001)
- Eutelsat 28B, also known as Eurobird 2 (launched in 2008)
- Sirius 3 (retired, launched in 1998)

== Market ==
The satellites at the Astra 28.2°E position primarily provide digital TV, digital radio and multimedia services to the UK and Republic of Ireland, broadcasting more than 470 TV, radio and interactive channels to homes in the UK and Ireland. The majority of these channels broadcast as part of British Sky Broadcasting’s Sky Digital pay-TV platform or the free-to-air Freesat platform, and they include free-to-air and encrypted high definition television (HDTV) channels.

At this position, Astra 2F also provides capacity on a spot beam deployed on West Africa, and Astra 2E provides a beam across the Middle East.

== Capacity and reach ==
As of December 2019 the Astra satellites at 28.2° east broadcast on 305 transponders (11 Ka-band and 294 Ku-band) to 45.7 million households (23.8 million via cable, 9.2 million via IPTV and 12.7 million direct to home satellite dishes).

== History ==
This position was the second orbital position used by SES (after Astra 19.2°E) and the first to provide only digital channels. The first craft to occupy this position was Astra 1D, relocated from Astra 19.2°E in March 1998 to provide capacity for testing UK digital TV transmissions before the start of Sky Digital (originally slated for June 1998 but then delayed until October 1998).

Following the successful launch of Astra 2A to the Astra 28.2°E position on August 30, 1998, Astra 1D was returned to 19.2°E in October 1998.

Sirius 3, from Nordic Satellite AB (later, SES Sirius then incorporated in SES) was leased to SES immediately after its launch on October 5, 1998, for a period of 12 months (after which it was moved to its original destination of 5°E) to provide further capacity at 28.2°E for the expanding Sky Digital service and to back up Astra 2A, pending the launch of Astra 2B on September 14, 2000.

Although Astra 2C was built for the Astra 28.2°E position, it was first deployed after launch in 2001 at 19.2°E where it provided pan-European capacity pending the launch of Astra 1L. Astra 2C was moved to the Astra 28.2°E position in August 2007. In March 2009, SES announced that in April, Astra 2C was to be moved to Astra 31.5°E to temporarily take over the mission of Astra 5A which had failed in orbit, and to remain at Astra 31.5°E for about one year until Astra 3B was launched to Astra 23.5°E, when another craft at that position could be released to Astra 31.5°E and Astra 2C returned to 28.2° east. The move of Astra 2C to Astra 31.5°E was completed on May 11. Astra 3B was brought into operation at Astra 23.5°E in June 2011, however, in September 2010, Astra 2C was moved back to Astra 19.2°E.

Late in 2009 SES announced that three more satellites have been ordered for this position. The three craft, Astra 2E, Astra 2F and Astra 2G, are being built by Astrium on the Eurostar E3000 platform for K_{u} and K_{a} band use in Europe and Africa, and will be launched between 2012 and 2014.

In August 2011 Astra 1N was launched to the 28.2°E position to provide interim capacity for the UK and Republic of Ireland with a UK spot beam receivable on 45 cm dishes. Astra 1N was originally designed to provide digital television and radio broadcast services across Europe from the Astra 19.2°E position and is expected to be moved to that orbital position when Astra 2E, Astra 2F and Astra 2G come into service. All traffic on Astra 2D was transferred to Astra 1N in early 2012. Astra 2D remained co-located at 28.2°E, with no transponder activity, until it was repositioned to Astra 5°E in July 2015.

On September 28, 2012, Astra 2F was successfully launched from Kourou in French Guiana. The satellite underwent tests at 43.5°E and began commercial operations at 28.2°E on November 21, 2012. As of June 2013 five transponders are active on Astra 2F's UK beam and two on the West Africa beam. This released Astra 2B for its planned relocation to the Astra 19.2°E position in February 2013.

Astra 2E was launched to the Astra 28.2°E position from Baikonur in Kazakhstan on September 30, 2013 following a 10-week delay caused by the catastrophic failure of a previous launch. When Astra 2E became operational in February 2014, all channels currently broadcasting from Astra 1N were moved to Astra 2E and Astra 1N relocated to its design location of 19.2°E.)

Astra 2G was launched on December 27, 2014. The craft was positioned at 21.0°E for three months before being moved to 43.5°E for testing. It was then moved west to be co-located with the Astra 2E and Astra 2F satellites at 28.2°E.

In March 2015, two years beyond Astra 2A's projected lifespan, and following the launches of Astra 2E in 2013, Astra 2F in 2012, and Astra 2G in 2014 to 28.2°E (Astra 2G initially going to 21.0°E), all remaining traffic was transferred from Astra 2A to the newer satellites. As of June 29, 2015, Astra 2A remains at the 28.2°E slot but is inactive and is expected to be moved to Astra 23.5°E, to operate as a backup satellite to Astra 3B.

On June 15, 2015, Astra 2G arrived at the Astra 28.2°E slot and on June 18 the first channels transferred from Astra 2E, Astra 2F and, in particular from Eutelsat 28A, which was some two years beyond its expected end-of-life and operating with some transponders considerably under power. The final Eutelsat 28A channels, including the Freesat EPG data channel, transferred to Astra 2G on June 29, 2015.

== See also ==
- SES satellite owner
- Astra 19.2°E
- Astra 5°E
- Astra 23.5°E
- Astra 31.5°E
