= Astra 1M =

Communications satellite

- Mission type: Communications
- Operator: SES
- COSPAR ID: 2008-057A
- SATCAT no.: 33436
- Website: https://www.ses.com
- Mission duration: 15 years (planned); 17 years, 3 months, 6 days (elapsed)

Spacecraft properties
- Spacecraft type: Eurostar
- Bus: Eurostar 3000S
- Manufacturer: Astrium (now Airbus Defence and Space)
- Launch mass: 5,320 kg (11,730 lb)
- Power: 10 kW

Start of mission
- Launch date: 5 November 2008, 20:44:20 UTC
- Rocket: Proton-M / Briz-M
- Launch site: Baikonur, Site 200/39
- Contractor: Khrunichev State Research and Production Space Center
- Entered service: January 2009

Orbital parameters
- Reference system: Geocentric orbit
- Regime: Geostationary orbit
- Longitude: 19.2° East

Transponders
- Band: 36 Ku-band
- Bandwidth: 26 MHz; 33 MHz
- Coverage area: Europe, Africa, Middle East

Astra 1M is a geostationary communications satellite which is operated by SES. It is positioned in geostationary orbit at a longitude of 19.2° East, from where it is used to provide direct to home (DTH) broadcasting to Europe, Africa, and the Middle East.

== Satellite description ==
Astra 1M was built by Astrium (now Airbus Defence and Space) under a contract signed in July 2005, and is based on the Eurostar 3000S satellite bus. It is equipped with thirty six transponders operating in the J-band of the NATO-defined spectrum, or the Ku-band of the older IEEE-defined spectrum. At launch it had a mass of 5,320 kg (11,730 lb), with an expected operational lifespan of 15 years, however four of its transponders were deactivated five years after launch. At the beginning of its operational life, it had a maximum power consumption of 10 kilowatts by the end of the satellite's operational life.

== Launch ==
The launch of Astra 1M was conducted by International Launch Services (ILS), using a Proton-M launch vehicle with a Briz-M upper stage. The launch occurred from Site 200/39 at the Baikonur Cosmodrome in Kazakhstan, at 20:44:20 UTC on 5 November 2008. Astra 1M was successfully placed into a geostationary transfer orbit (GTO), from which it raised itself to geostationary orbit by means of an onboard apogee motor.

== See also ==
- 2008 in spaceflight
- SES satellite operator
- Astra satellite family
- Astra 19.2°E orbital position
- Astra 1KR co-located satellite
- Astra 1L co-located satellite
- Astra 1N co-located satellite
- Astra 2C previously co-located satellite
