= Eurostar (satellite bus) =

Telecommunications satellite platform

Eurostar is a satellite bus made by Airbus Defence and Space (formerly Astrium, and before 1994, British Aerospace, and Matra Marconi Space—the former Marconi Space having been merged with Matra's former "Matra Espace" division) which has been used for a series of spacecraft providing telecommunications services in geosynchronous orbit (GEO). More than 70 Eurostar satellites have been ordered to date, of which more than 55 have been successfully launched since October 1990 and have proven highly reliable in operational service. In December 2013, the Eurostar satellites accumulated 500 years of successful operations in orbit. The Eurostar spacecraft series is designed for a variety of telecommunications needs including fixed services and broadcast, mobile services, broadband and secured communications.

== Development ==
Eurostar was designed in the mid 1980s jointly by Matra Marconi Space and BAe (now integrated within Airbus Defence and Space) to Inmarsat specifications, for a market which at the time had a design envelope of 1.8-2.5 Tons on the proposed launch vehicles (STS PAM D2 and Ariane 4). Satellite payload power was from 1300 to 2600 W. This was the first commercial satellite to have a digital avionics system modular in concept. With this system architecture, all key satellite parameters are in software, which permits mission specific requirements to be implemented without hardware changes. The initial satellite structure and configuration designed to early requirements had significant growth potential, which subsequently allowed the payload capability (mass and power) to be more than quadrupled between 1987 and 1992, with a minimum of re qualification. Airbus DS has since developed further the product line in a staged process which mainly increases the satellite power and propulsion capability and real estate for accommodation of equipment and antennas. The overall configuration of Eurostar satellites has essentially not changed in 20 years through the successive generations Eurostar E1000, E2000, E2000+ and E3000. They have just become larger, more powerful, with implementation costs reduced through longer orbit manoeuvring lifetime, and more efficient and powerful payloads. Nowadays the Eurostar E3000 series has been considerably enhanced and updated with the latest technologies, still maintaining the basic proven configuration. A new version E3000e introduced in 2014 uses electric propulsion for orbit raising.

== Range ==
=== Eurostar E1000 ===
The original Eurostar E1000 satellite was designed for the Inmarsat-2 fleet requirements by an international team led by Matra Marconi Space and British Aerospace Space Systems (BAe Dynamics), the former of which would ultimately acquire BAe Dynamics to eventually become Astrium and eventually merge with Airbus Military to form the present Airbus Defence and Space. Three-axis stabilized, and designed for a 10-year service life, the Inmarsat-2 had 4 (+2) L-band transponders and 1 (+1) C-Band transponders. The satellite featured a launch mass of 1.31 t (2,900 lb), however, the satellite bus was designed to weigh up to 2.5 t (5,500 lb) to accommodate future customer requirements. Subsequently, the spacecraft also came with different payload power options ranging from 1300 W to 3000 W. This degree of customization was the result of a highly modular design that would carry over onto the upgraded variants.

A total of four satellites based on the E1000 bus have been built and launched, all of which were for Inmarsat.

=== Eurostar E2000/E2000+ ===
The Eurostar E2000, which debuted with France Telecom as the launch customer in December 1991, was a larger and more capable upgrade of the E1000. It was developed from a set of requirements by the French Space Agency (CNES) and the French Ministry of Armed Forces via the Directorate-General for Armaments (DGA). The DGA had decided to repartner with CNES in order to add X-Band capabilities to the mission to enable the creation of their Syracuse II military ground-based telecommunications network, and to replace and enhance the role of the Syracuse I systems aboard the aging Telecom-1 fleet. The first of the satellites to be launched would be the Telecom 2A. Each of the four Telecom-2 satellites in the constellation had 10 x C-Band transponders, 14 x Ku-Band transponders and 5 x X-Band transponders. Despite the increase in capabilities, the E2000 bus used for Telecom-2 was only slightly heavier than the E1000, with an on-orbit mass of 1.38 t (3,000 lb) and a dry weight of 700 kilograms (1,500 lb), however, like its predecessor, was also designed to accommodate larger payloads with a total launch mass of up to 2.5 t (5,500 lb), should the customer require it. The E2000’s operational/maneuverability life varied by customer, but ranged from 7 to 10 years. The E2000’s main power comes from two swivelling solar arrays, with later models capable of producing up to 3600W per array, or 6200 W total with an optional array spanning 22 m (72 ft).

The E2000+ satellite bus offered a series of significant upgrades, in addition to being slightly larger than the E2000. Upgrades included:

- Increased efficiency in its ability to operate over 40 transponders
- Increased maximum launch mass of up to 3.4 t (7,500 lb)
- Increased payload power up to 6.2 kW (6,200 W)
- Capability to carry up to 48 high powered amplifiers in addition to large multiple antenna configurations
- Increased maneuverability life to 15 years
- Integration of CCSDS telemetry and telecommand protocols.

The first E2000+ customer was Eutelsat's Hot Bird 2. At least 23 E2000 and E2000+ satellite busses were built, with a total of 22 launches.

=== Eurostar E3000 & Eurostar Neo ===
The Eurostar E3000 satellite bus was first launched in 2004 with Eutesat's Eutelsat W3A payload. Building upon the idea of modularity, the satellite itself can be built with several modules to serve different missions, all based around a common service module, communications module with 1,2, or 3 floors, a chemical or chemical-electric propulsion module, and scalable payload power options. Satellite power can be up to 16 kW (16,000 W) stored in either NiH2 or Lithium-Ion batteries. The solar array's wingspan is also scalable, and capable of deploying to be up to 45 m (148 ft) wide. The spacecraft's maximum launch mass has increased to 6.4 t (14,000 lb), while its telecommunications payload capacity has been increased to up to 120 installed high-power amplifiers/transponders. In 2018, Airbus D&S launched the first E3000e - a modified E3000 with all-electric propulsion, removing the standard propulsion module and over 2,000 kg (4,400 lb) of excess mass with it. SES-12 for SES was the first customer for the E3000e in June 2018. At least 48 x E3000 and E3000e satellite busses had been built and launched by the end of 2018.

An improved model based on the E3000e called the Eurostar Neo was announced in 2017, offering electric, hybrid, or chemical propulsion, in addition to a scalable power range of 7 kW to 25 kW. In 2021 the first Eurostar Neo, Eutelsat Hot Bird 13F, started final integration.

As of 2020, a total of 84 Eurostar satellites had been ordered, with 6 E3000e satellites already in operation.

== Modularity ==
The Eurostar satellite structures are modular with a separate Service-Propulsion module and Communications module.

== Satellite orders ==
=== Eurostar-1000 ===
Satellite	Country	Operator	Type	Coverage	Launch date (GMT)	Rocket	Changes	Status
Inmarsat-2 F1	International	Inmarsat	Communications	4 L-band, 1 C-band	30 October 1990	Delta II 6925		Retired
Inmarsat-2 F2	International	Inmarsat	Communications	4 L-band, 1 C-band	8 March 1991	Delta II 6925		Retired
Inmarsat-2 F3	International	Inmarsat	Communications	4 L-band, 1 C-band	16 December 1991	Ariane-44L		Retired
Inmarsat-2 F2	International	Inmarsat	Communications	4 L-band, 1 C-band	15 April 1992	Ariane-44L		Retired

=== Eurostar-2000 ===
Satellite	Country	Operator	Type	Coverage	Launch date (GMT)	Rocket	Changes	Status
Hispasat 1A	Spain	Hispasat	Communications & military communications	12 Ku-band, 3 X-band	10 September 1992	Ariane-44L		Retired
Hispasat 1B	Spain	Hispasat	Communications & military communications	12 Ku-band, 3 X-band	22 July 1993	Ariane-44L		Retired
Nilesat 101	Egypt	Nilesat	Television broadcasting	12 Ku-band	28 April 1998	Ariane-44P		Retired
Nilesat 102	Egypt	Nilesat	Television broadcasting	12 Ku-band	28 April 1998	Ariane-44P		Retired
Orion 1	United States	Telstar	Television broadcasting & satellite internet	34 Ku-band	29 November 1994	Atlas IIA	Known as Telstar 11	Retired
Telecom 2A	France	France Telecom	Communications & military communications	10 C-band, 11 Ku-band, 5 X-band	16 December 1991	Ariane-44L		Retired
Telecom 2B	France	France Telecom	Communications & military communications	10 C-band, 11 Ku-band, 5 X-band	15 April 1992	Ariane-44L		Retired
Telecom 2C	France	France Telecom	Communications & military communications	10 C-band, 11 Ku-band, 5 X-band	6 December 1995	Ariane-44L		Retired
Telecom 2D	France	France Telecom	Communications & military communications	10 C-band, 11 Ku-band, 5 X-band	8 August 1996	Ariane-44L		Retired

=== Eurostar-2000+ ===
Satellite	Country	Operator	Type	Coverage	Launch date (GMT)	Rocket	Changes	Status
AfriStar	United States	1worldspace	Communications	3 L-band	28 October 1998	Ariane-44L	Known as Spectrum 1	Retired
AsiaStar	United States	1worldspace	Communications	3 L-band	21 March 2000	Ariane 5G	Known as Spectrum 2	Active
Arabsat 4A	Saudi Arabia	Arabsat	Communications	24 C-band, 16 Ku-band	28 February 2006	Proton-M	Known as Badr 1	Launch failure
Arabsat 4B	Saudi Arabia	Arabsat	Communications	28 Ku-band	8 November 2006	Proton-M	Known as Badr 4	Active
Arabsat 4AR	Saudi Arabia	Arabsat	Communications	24 C-band, 20 Ku-band	7 July 2008	Ariane 5 ECA	Known as Badr 6	Active
Astra 2B	Luxembourg	SES	Communications	30 Ku-band	14 September 2000	Ariane 5G		Retired
Eutelsat W1	International	Eutelsat	Television broadcasting & satellite internet	28 Ku-band	6 September 2000	Ariane-44P	Known as Eutelsat 4A	Retired
Hotbird 2	International	Eutelsat	Television broadcasting	20 Ku-band	21 November 1996	Atlas IIA	Known as Eutelsat 48A	Retired
Hotbird 3	International	Eutelsat	Television broadcasting	20 Ku-band	2 September 1997	Ariane-44LP	Known as Eutelsat W75/ABS 1B	Active
Hotbird 4	International	Eutelsat	Television broadcasting	20 Ku-band	27 February 1998	Ariane-44P	Known as Eutelsat 16B	Retired
Hotbird 5	International	Eutelsat	Television broadcasting	20 Ku-band	9 October 1998	Atlas IIA	Known as Eutelsat 4B	Retired
Hotbird 7	International	Eutelsat	Television broadcasting	40 Ku-band	11 December 2002	Ariane 5 ECA	Known as Eutelsat 4B	Launch failure
ST-1	Singapore, Taiwan	Singtel	Television broadcasting	16 Ku-band, 14 C-band	25 August 1998	Ariane-44P		Retired

=== Eurostar-3000 ===
Satellite	Country	Operator	Type	Coverage	Launch date (GMT)	Rocket	Changes	Status
ANASIS-II	South Korea	ADD	Military communications		20 July 2020	Falcon 9	Known as Koreasat 116	Active
Amazonas 2	Spain	Hispasat	Communications	54 Ku-band, 10 C-band	20 July 2020	Ariane 5 ECA		Active
Arabsat-5A	Saudi Arabia	Arabsat	Television broadcasting & satellite internet	16 C-band, 24 Ku-band	26 June 2010	Ariane 5 ECA		Active
Arabsat-5B	Saudi Arabia	Arabsat	Television broadcasting & satellite internet	56 Ku-band, 56 Ka-band	3 June 2010	Proton-M	Known as Badr 5	Active
Arabsat-5C	Saudi Arabia	Arabsat	Communications	26 C-band, 12 Ka-band	21 September 2011	Ariane 5 ECA		Active
Arabsat-6B	Saudi Arabia	Arabsat	Communications	24 Ku-band, 27 Ka-band	10 November 2015	Ariane 5 ECA		Active
Astra 1M	Luxembourg	SES	Television broadcasting & satellite internet	32 Ku-band	5 November 2008	Proton-M		Active
Astra 1N	Luxembourg	SES	Television broadcasting	55 Ku-band	6 August 2011	Ariane 5 ECA		Active
Astra 2E	Luxembourg	SES	Television broadcasting	60 Ku-band, 3 Ka-band	29 September 2013	Proton-M	Known as Eutelsat 28E	Active
Astra 2F	Luxembourg	SES	Television broadcasting	60 Ku-band, 3 Ka-band	28 September 2012	Ariane 5 ECA	Known as Eutelsat 28F	Active
Astra 2G	Luxembourg	SES	Television broadcasting	62 Ku-band, 4 Ka-band	27 December 2014	Proton-M	Known as Eutelsat 28G	Active
Astra 3B	Luxembourg	SES	Television broadcasting	52 Ku-band, 4 Ka-band	21 May 2010	Ariane 5 ECA		Active
Astra 5B	Luxembourg	SES	Television broadcasting	40 Ku-band, 3 Ka-band, L-band	22 March 2014	Ariane 5 ECA		Active
AT&T T-16	United States	DirecTV	Television broadcasting	30 Ku-band, 24 Ka-band, 18 Reverse band	20 June 2019	Ariane 5 ECA		Active
Atlantic Bird 7	International	Eutelsat	Television broadcasting	56 Ku-band	24 September 2011	Zenit-3SL	Known as Eutelsat 7 West A	Active
DirecTV 15	United States	DirecTV	Television broadcasting	30 Ku-band, 24 Ka-band, 18 Reverse band	27 May 2015	Ariane 5 ECA		Active
EchoStar 105 / SES 11	Luxembourg, United States	SES, EchoStar	Television broadcasting	24 Ku-band, 24 C-band	11 October 2017	Falcon 9		Active
Ekspress AM4	Russia	RSCC	Communications	30 C-band, 2 Ka-band, 3 L-band	17 August 2011	Proton-M		Launch failure
Ekspress AM4R	Russia	RSCC	Communications	30 C-band, 2 Ka-band, 3 L-band	15 May 2014	Proton-M		Launch failure
Ekspress AM7	Russia	RSCC	Communications	24 C-band, 36 Ku-band, 2 L-band	18 March 2015	Proton-M		Active
Ekspress-AMU1	Russia	RSCC	Communications	70 Ku-band, 70 Ka-band	24 December 2015	Proton-M		Active
Eutelsat 3B	International	Eutelsat	Television broadcasting & satellite internet	51 C-band, 51 Ku band, 51 Ka-band	26 May 2014	Zenit-3SL		Active
Eutelsat 9B / EDRS A	International	Eutelsat	Television broadcasting & satellite relay	66 Ku-band, EDRS payload	29 January 2016	Proton-M		Active
Eutelsat 70B	International	Eutelsat	Communications	48 Ku-band	3 December 2012	Zenit-3SL		Active
Hotbird 8	International	Eutelsat	Television broadcasting	64 Ku-band, 64 Ka-band	4 August 2006	Proton-M	Known as Hotbird 13B	Active
Hotbird 9	International	Eutelsat	Television broadcasting	64 Ku-band, 64 Ka-band	20 December 2008	Ariane 5 ECA	Known as Hotbird 13C	Active
Hotbird 10	International	Eutelsat	Television broadcasting	64 Ku-band, 64 Ka-band	12 February 2009	Ariane 5 ECA	Known as Eutelsat 33E	Active
Intelsat 10-02	International	Intelsat	Communications	45 C-band, 16 Ku-band	16 June 2004	Proton-M	Known as Thor 10-02	Active
Intelsat 32e	International	Intelsat	Television broadcasting	81 Ku-band, 21 Ka-band	14 February 2017	Ariane 5 ECA	Known as Sky-Brasil 1	Active
KA-SAT	International	Eutelsat	Television broadcasting	Ka-band	26 December 2010	Proton-M	Known as Eutelsat KA-SAT 9A	Active
MEASAT-3b	Malaysia	MEASAT Satellite Systems	Communications	48 Ku-band	11 September 2014	Ariane 5 ECA	Known as Jabiru 2	Active
MEASAT-3d	Malaysia	MEASAT Satellite Systems	Television broadcasting & satellite internet	C-band, Ku-band, L-band	22 June 2022	Ariane 5 ECA		Active
SES-6	Luxembourg	SES	Television broadcasting	38 C-band, 36 Ku-band	3 June 2013	Proton-M		Active
SES-10	Luxembourg	SES	Television broadcasting	50 Ku-band	30 March 2017	Falcon 9		Active
Telstar 12V	United States	Telesat	Communications	52 Ku-band	24 November 2015	H-IIA 204		Active
Tiba 1	Egypt	Government of Egypt	Communications	Ka-band	26 November 2019	Ariane 5 ECA		Active
Yahsat 1A	United Arab Emirates	Al Yah	Communications	14 C-band, 25 Ku-band, 21 Ka-band	22 April 2011	Ariane 5 ECA	Known as Al Yah 1	Active
Yahsat 1B	United Arab Emirates	Al Yah	Communications	25 Ka-band, 21 secure Ka-band	23 April 2012	Proton-M	Known as Al Yah 2	Active

=== Eurostar-3000EOR ===
Satellite	Country	Operator	Type	Coverage	Launch date (GMT)	Rocket	Changes	Status
Eutelsat 172B	International	Eutelsat	Communications	14 C-band, 36 Ku-band	1 June 2017	Ariane 5 ECA		Active
Inmarsat-6 F1	International	Inmarsat	Communications	L-band, Ka-band	22 December 2021	H-IIA 204	Known as GX 6A	Active
Inmarsat-6 F2	International	Inmarsat	Communications	L-band, Ka-band	18 February 2023	Falcon 9	Known as GX 6B	Active
SES-12	Luxembourg	SES	Communications	68 Ku-band, 8 Ka-band	4 June 2018	Falcon 9		Active
SES-14 / GOLD	Luxembourg	SES	Television broadcasting	C-band, Ku-band, GOLD	25 January 2018	Ariane 5 ECA		Active
Syracuse 4B	France	DGA	Military communications	X-band, Ka-band	5 July 2023	Ariane 5 ECA	Also known as Comsat-NG 2	Active
Türksat 5A	Turkey	Türksat	Communications	Ku-band	8 January 2021	Falcon 9		Active
Türksat 5B	Turkey	Türksat	Communications	Ku-band, Ka-band	19 December 2021	Falcon 9		Active

=== Eurostar-3000GM ===
Satellite	Country	Operator	Type	Coverage	Launch date (GMT)	Rocket	Changes	Status
Inmarsat-4 F1	International	Inmarsat	Mobile communications	L-band	11 March 2005	Atlas V 431		Active
Inmarsat-4 F2	International	Inmarsat	Mobile communications	L-band	8 November 2005	Zenit-3SL		Active
Inmarsat-4 F3	International	Inmarsat	Mobile communications	L-band	18 August 2008	Proton-M		Active

=== Eurostar-3000S ===
Satellite	Country	Operator	Type	Coverage	Launch date (GMT)	Rocket	Changes	Status
Amazonas 1	Spain	Hispasat	Television broadcasting	36 Ku-band, 27 C-band	4 August 2004	Proton-M		Retired
Anik F1	Canada	Telesat	Communications	24 C-band, 32 Ku-band	8 September 2005	Proton-M		Active
Anik F3	Canada	Telesat	Communications	24 C-band, 32 Ku-band, 2 Ka-band	9 April 2007	Proton-M		Active
Eutelsat W3A	International	Eutelsat	Communications	38 Ku-band, 2 Ka-band	15 March 2004	Proton-M	Known as Eutelsat 7A	Active
Nimiq-4	Canada	Telesat	Communications	32 Ku-band, 8 Ka-band	19 September 2008	Proton-M		Active
Skynet 5A	United Kingdom	Ministry of Defence (United Kingdom)	Military communications		11 March 2007	Ariane 5 ECA		Active
Skynet 5B	United Kingdom	Ministry of Defence (United Kingdom)	Military communications		14 November 2007	Ariane 5 ECA		Active
Skynet 5C	United Kingdom	Ministry of Defence (United Kingdom)	Military communications		12 June 2008	Ariane 5 ECA		Active
Skynet 5D	United Kingdom	Ministry of Defence (United Kingdom)	Military communications		19 December 2012	Ariane 5 ECA		Active

=== AstroBus-G ===
Satellite	Country	Operator	Type	Coverage	Launch date (GMT)	Rocket	Changes	Status
Chollian	South Korea	KARI	Meteorology		26 June 2010	Ariane 5 ECA	Known as GEO-Kompsat 1	Active

=== Eurostar-Neo ===
Satellite	Country	Operator	Type	Coverage	Launch date (GMT)	Rocket	Changes	Status
Arabsat 7B	Saudi Arabia	Arabsat	Communications	C-band, Ku-band, TELEO	27 May 2023	Falcon 9	Known as Badr 8	Active
Eutelsat 36D	International	Eutelsat	Television broadcasting	70 Ku-band	30 March 2024	Falcon 9		Active
Hotbird 13F	International	Eutelsat	Television broadcasting	80 Ku-band	15 October 2022	Falcon 9		Active
Hotbird 13G	International	Eutelsat	Television broadcasting	80 Ku-band	3 November 2022	Falcon 9		Active
Skynet 6A	United Kingdom	Ministry of Defence (United Kingdom)	Military communications		2025	Falcon 9		Awaiting launch
Spainsat NG I	Spain	Hisdesat	Military communications	X-band, Ka-band, UHF	30 January 2025	Falcon 9		Active
Spainsat NG II	Spain	Hisdesat	Military communications	X-band, Ka-band, UHF	2025	Falcon 9		Awaiting launch
Thuraya 4	United Arab Emirates	Thuraya	Mobile communications	L-band	4 January 2025	Falcon 9		Active
Thuraya 5	United Arab Emirates	Thuraya	Mobile communications	L-band	202x			Awaiting launch

=== OneSat ===
Satellite	Country	Operator	Type	Coverage	Launch date (GMT)	Rocket	Changes	Status
Inmarsat-7 F1	International	Inmarsat	Communications	Ka-band	2023		Known as GX7	Awaiting launch
Inmarsat-7 F2	International	Inmarsat	Communications	Ka-band	202x		Known as GX8	Awaiting launch
Inmarsat-7 F3	International	Inmarsat	Communications	Ka-band	202x		Known as GX9	Awaiting launch
Intelsat 42	International	Intelsat	Communications	Reconfigurable multiband	2023			Awaiting launch
Intelsat 43	International	Intelsat	Communications	Reconfigurable multiband	2023			Awaiting launch
Optus 11	Australia	Optus	Communications	Ku-band	2023	Ariane 64		Awaiting launch
Superbird-9	Japan	SKY Perfect JSAT	Communications	Ka-band, Ku-band	2024	Starship		Awaiting launch
Thaicom TBD	Thailand	Thaicom	Communications	Ku-band	202x			Awaiting launch
