= Eurostar E3000 =

Series of satellite bus

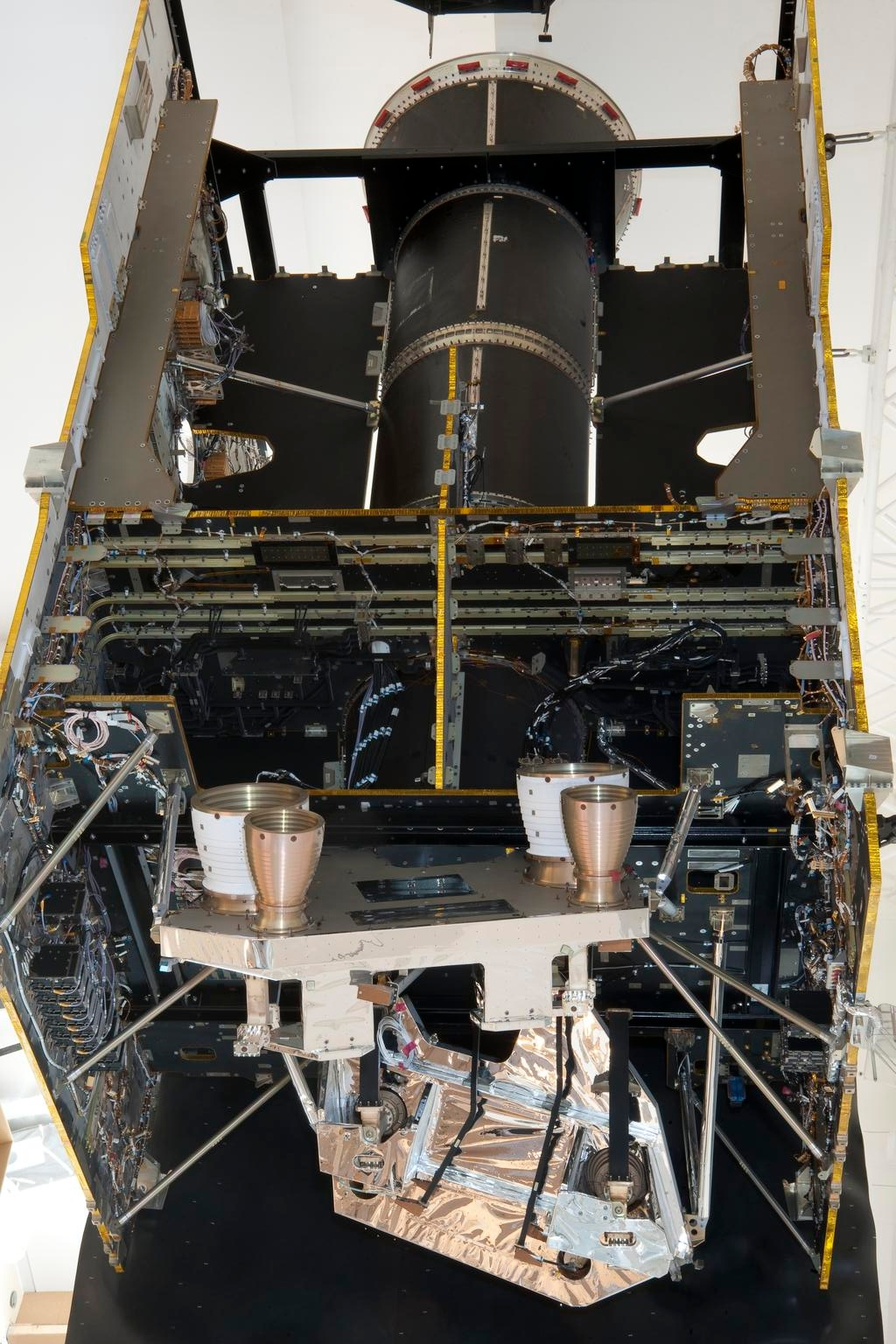
A Eurostar 3000 satellite made in 2000

The Eurostar E3000 is a generic satellite model most commonly used for commercial and military communications satellites manufactured by Airbus Defence and Space (formerly Astrium). It is a member of Airbus Defence and Space's Eurostar family. It utilises a chemical, bi-propellant propulsion system for orbit raising and on-station manoeuvres with an optional plasma propulsion system (PPS). The PPS harnesses the Newtonian effect as a result of the ionisation of xenon gas employed by the use of Hall effect plasma thrusters. This system is most commonly used for north–south station-keeping. The E3000 was the first commercial satellite family to use lithium–ion batteries rather than the older nickel-based technologies for power supply during eclipses.

The E3000 bus can be modified extensively to meet customer requirements, but most of the E3000 satellites have a launch mass of between 4,500 and 6,000 kg (9,900 and 13,200 lb), and solar arrays between 35 and 45 m (115 and 148 ft) providing between nine and sixteen kilowatts at end of life. They tend to feature between 50 and 90 transponders, most often in the Ku-band and C-band.

There have been 52 satellites built around the E3000 platform including ANASIS 2, Hispasat's Amazonas 1 and 2, Arabsat-5A, -5B, and -5C, Astra 1M, 1N, 2E, 2F, 2G, 3B and 5B, Eutelsat's W3A and Hot Bird 8–10, Intelsat 10-02, KA-SAT, Atlantic Bird 7, 70B Telesat's Anik F1R, F3 and Nimiq-4, Skynet 5A–C and the Inmarsat 4-series of satellites. Each of the three Inmarsat 4 in service has a large deployable reflector as the main antenna.

In March 2015, Airbus Defence and Space received a delivery of new 3D-printed brackets for mounting telemetry and tele-command antennas, being the first space-qualified 3D-printed component of its kind.

== Eurostar E3000EOR ==
Also in March 2015, Airbus signed a contract with Snecma for 5-kilowatt PPS5000 Hall-effect thrusters for the E3000 Electric Orbit Raising (E3000EOR) variant of the satellite bus. New thrusters would allow reducing the weight of a satellite by up to 40%.

== Eurostar Neo ==
An improved model based on the E3000 called the Eurostar Neo was announced in 2017, offering electric, hybrid, or chemical propulsion, in addition to a scalable power range of 7 kW to 25 kW.
