= Aora =

Indonesian satellite TV company

- Type: Satellite television
- Country: Indonesia
- Motto: "Asyiknya 24 Jam"
- Owner: Karyamegah Adijaya
- Key people: Rini Soemarno, Ongki P. Soemarno
- Launch date: 8 August 2008; 16 years ago
- Dissolved: 23 March 2015; 10 years ago
- Official website: www.aora.tv (Original site via the Internet Archive.)

Aora was an Indonesian direct broadcast satellite pay television company that is operated by Karyamegah Adijaya and owned by Rini Soemarno, Ongki P. Soemarno, and Sugiono Wiyono. It started its nationwide broadcast in the beginning of August 2008 with an initial ten channels, highlighting the 2008 Summer Olympics. Four of the channels were dedicated to Olympic coverage. Aora earned the exclusive broadcasting rights to the 2008 Olympics exclusively for Indonesia.

In August 2008, Aora TV won the sole rights in Indonesia to broadcast the 2008–09 season of the Premier League and offered a new, 12-channel package service which included ESPN and STAR Sports, which contains the Premier League content. This allows Aora subscribers to watch, in full, 370 Premier League matches of the 2008/09 season, including preview shows and weekly highlights. The Premier League broadcast rights expired just hours before the start of the 2009/2010 season, leading Aora to replace both channels with GOALTV, effective on August 15, 2009. The loss of Premier League programming led to subscribers to drop the service; as a result, the service was shut down at the end of 2009.

In January 2011, Aora was relaunched as a budget pay TV service, with rates at Rp.59,000 (around $7 at that time) per month.

On March 23, 2015, Aora's subscribers were notified via an email that the service would cease operations on pretext of satellite realignment. That same day, their Facebook page sent out a farewell message. In the weeks leading to the shutdown, subscribers reportedly had problems contacting Aora's customer services while the company gradually began losing channels.
