= DF1 =

German satellite television provider

- Formerly: Premiere AG (1991–2009)
- Type: Subsidiary
- Industry: Mass media
- Founded: 1996; 30 years ago
- Headquarters: Unterföhring, Germany
- Area served: Germany; Austria; Australia
- Key people: Leo Kirch
- Services: Pay TV
- Owner: Kirch Group
- Parent: Kirch Group

DF1 (Digitales Fernsehen 1) was the first digital television company in Germany. Founded by the Kirch Group in 1996 and headquartered in the Munich suburb of Unterföhring, it provided the country's first digital satellite package delivered over Astra. Its short existence was plagued by legal problems and a failed merger with Premiere AG, which was halted in 1998 by the order of the European Commission. Subsequently, several of its shareholders withdrew from the Kirch Group and the former DF1 was subsequently put up under Premiere's hands as Premiere World.

== History ==
On 1 April 1996, Kirch started testing twelve digital satellite channels, at a time when several companies were interested in starting a digital satellite operation. These channels were the basis for DF1 and were expected to have as many as five million subscribers within a decade. Coinciding with the signal tests, a pilot service started for 100 households.

DF1 employed its own set-top box known as d-box. Deutsche Telekom employed the SECA system for its digital cable network, which meant that DF1's channels were incompatible with the encryption method used by the cable company. The TF1 Group also showed interest in using the d-box STB. Telekom was accused of blocking a competing service, disabling it from having Kirch's channels on cable.

On 11 June, Kirch revealed details of the DF1 service, as well as its marketing and programming strategies, eyeing for a potential early July launch. It was also in discussions with content providers to launch an interactive games service. In early July, it formed a partnership with BSkyB, after the British partner was dissatisfied with Bertelsmann, which turned out to be one of Telekom's partners. An agreement with TimeWarner was announced days ahead of launching, enabling its movie channels to air Warner Bros. titles.

DF1 started full broadcasts on 28 July 1996, a Sunday, with its key selling point being the multi-camera set-up of the Formula One race held that day, one of its interactive television services. After launch, it signed deals with MCA for Universal titles, while RTL (Bertelsmann) was also snatching titles to 200 titles from the company. Both companies received the highest bids so far at the time.

In a strategic about face for the network, Canal+ announced that it would launch several of its channels on DF1. During its first month, authorities viewed DF1 as some sort of "distribution cartel". On 29 August, it inked an exclusive 10-year deal with The Walt Disney Company worth US$1.3 billion, which would also lead to the launch of a localized Disney Channel. It then threatened to cut the supply of movies to the Premiere network after accusing the competing network to air Forrest Gump as an exclusive, when, in reality, DF1's channels also aired it.

This eventually led to a planned ban on DF1 subscriptions outside of the state of Bavaria, where Kirch Media was headquartered. The ban was lifted later in February 1997. On 7 March, BSkyB left DF1, causing Kirch to continue managing the service alone. In order to try boosting its penetration, it signed deals with Bertelsmann and Deutsche Telekom for a potential source of revenue. It was eyeing a merger with Bertelsmann's interests, a move which Universal Pictures criticized and lodged a complaint to the European Commission to prevent it. On 27 May 1998, the EC banned the planned merger, this time between DF1 and Deutsche Telekom. The rejected plan involved the conversion of Premiere into a digital pay-TV platform. The Kirch Group announced on 1 July that DF1 would continue operation; at the time, it had 160,000 subscribers.

After the rejection of the merger, both Bertelsmann/CLT-UFA (37.5%) and Kirch (25%) agreed to raise their stakes in Premiere. Canal+ owned the remaining 37.5% but agreed to sell. Speaking at a conference in Munich in mid-October 1998, Dieter Hahn said he had no plans to close the platform. By the end of September, it already had 200,000 subscribers. Ahead of Christmas, it hoped to add Germany's first adult entertainment channel.

Not all channel owners were satisfied with DF1's situation and reluctancy to close. MultiThématiques Germany announced that it would pull the plug on the German version of Cine Classics at the end of December. Alain Fux, the company's director for Germany, said that the pay-TV market was facing obstacles, where the viewers were least advantaged as part of questionable decisions where media giants were being blocked, as well as EU decisions from Brussels. In January, Telekom announced a deal to market the ailing pay-TV package as part of its cable service.

The Federal Cartel Office approved Kirch Group acquiring a share of Premiere in April 1999, thus enabling the merger of the two pay-TV platforms. The successor service, Premiere World, was announced in late August and was given the green light from the federal anti-concentration commission KEK days ahead of the 1 October launch of the new service. The launch of Premiere World implied the end of DF1.
