= Astra 2D =

Final Operational Spin Stabilised Spacecraft

- Mission type: Communications
- Operator: SES
- COSPAR ID: 2000-081A
- SATCAT no.: 26638
- Website: https://www.ses.com/
- Mission duration: Planned: 15 years Final: 22 years, 1 month and 7 days

Spacecraft properties
- Bus: HS-376HP
- Manufacturer: Hughes Space and Communications
- Launch mass: 1,420 kg (3,130 lb)
- Power: 1.6 kW

Start of mission
- Launch date: 20 December 2000, 00:26 UTC
- Rocket: Ariane 5G (V138)
- Launch site: Centre Spatial Guyanais, ELA-3
- Contractor: Arianespace
- Entered service: February 2001

End of mission
- Disposal: Decommissioned
- Deactivated: 27 January 2023

Orbital parameters
- Reference system: Geocentric orbit
- Regime: Geostationary orbit
- Longitude: 28.2° East (2001–2015); 5.2° East (2015); 57° East (2015–2017); 60° East (2017–2018); 5.2° East (2018–2020); 57.2° East (2020–2023)

Transponders
- Band: 16 Ku-band
- Bandwidth: 26 MHz
- Coverage area: Europe

Astra 2D was one of the Astra communications satellites owned and operated by SES and located at 28.2° East in the geostationary orbit until June 2015. It was a Hughes Space and Communications HS-376HP satellite bus and was launched from the Centre Spatial Guyanais in December 2000 to join Astra 2A and Astra 2B at 28.2° East, where it remained for its active life.

== In service ==
While active, most of Astra 2D's transponders were used to provide television channels available on the Sky Digital satellite service to both Ireland and the United Kingdom, as well as the non-subscription service, freesat. Provision of rights-sensitive broadcasts free-to-air was made possible by the satellite's beam that was tightly focused on Ireland and the United Kingdom. However, surrounding countries had the ability to pick up the signal (dependent on suitably sized satellite dishes) and so could still access Freesat from outside the United Kingdom. Some channels on Astra 2D were encrypted with VideoGuard (a proprietary encryption method by the NDS Group) and only Sky Digiboxes with valid cards, or standard hardware with non-approved (with respect to the Sky/NDS end-user contract) "Dragon", or "T-Rex" conditional-access module can decode these channels.

The BBC broadcast all of its domestic television channels (including BBC HD and the regional variations) from the Astra 2D satellite, except the BBC News Channel and BBC Parliament which broadcast from Astra 2A. All domestic BBC channels have been free-to-air since 29 July 2003.

ITV also broadcast all its television channels (including regional variations of ITV1, and STV and UTV) from the Astra 2D satellite. All ITV channels have been free-to-air from 1 November 2005, although some regions reverted to free-to-view encryption in 2008 when their lease on one Astra 2D transponder could not be renewed.

Channel 4 broadcast most of its channels free-to-air from this satellite, including Channel 4, Channel 4+1, E4, More4 and Film4 along with their timeshift variants. All were unencrypted apart from the feeds of Channel 4, Channel 4+1, E4 and E4+1 intended for viewers in Ireland, which remain encrypted. From November 2008, Five began to transmit free-to-air for the first time on Astra 2D, using borrowed space on a BBC transponder, allowing the channel to join freesat.

== End of service ==
With a projected lifetime of 12 years, Astra 2D was expected to leave regular operational service towards the end of 2012 or the beginning of 2013 and so the Astra 1N satellite, designed for operation at Astra 19.2°E and launched in August 2011, was initially positioned at 28.2° East to temporarily replace Astra 2D until the start of service of its long-term replacement, Astra 2F, which was launched in September 2012.

Astra 1N started commercial service at 28.2° East in October 2011 with transponder testing in August and September 2011. Channels on Astra 2D started to transfer to Astra 1N in December 2011 with Channel 5 (plus 5* and 5USA), the Channel 4 family and ITV channels all moving to the new satellite over the next two months. On 24 February 2012, the last remaining channels on Astra 2D (the BBC channels) switched off and started transmission from Astra 1N.

Until June 2015, Astra 2D remained in position at 28.2° East, with no transponder activity. It was then moved and positioned at Astra 5°E in July 2015. In October 2015, Astra 2D was moved to 57° East alongside NSS-12. In December 2017, it was moved to 60° East. From May 2018 to July 2018, Astra 2D was moved west at 0.65°/day to Astra 5°E. From January 2020 to March 2020, Astra 2D was moved east at 0.9°/day back to 57.2° East, alongside NSS-12. In November 2021, Astra 2D was repositioned at 23.5°E.

=== Decommissioning ===
Astra 2D was decommissioned on 27 January 2023, after operating for 22 years 1 month and 7 days, and moved to a graveyard orbit. Astra 2D was the last commercial spin stabilised spacecraft built by Boeing and the only one still operating at the time of its retirement.

== See also ==
- Astra 2A
- Astra 2B
- Astra 2C
- Astra 2E
- Astra 2F
- Astra 2G
- Astra 28.2°E orbital position
- Astra 5°E orbital position
