= Astra 1A =

Telecommunications satellite

- Mission type: Communications
- Operator: SES
- COSPAR ID: 1988-109B
- SATCAT no.: 19688
- Website: https://www.ses.com/
- Mission duration: 12 years (planned); 16 years (achieved)

Spacecraft properties
- Bus: AS-4000
- Manufacturer: GE Astro Space (now Lockheed Martin Space Systems)
- Launch mass: 1,768 kg (3,898 lb)
- Dimensions: 1.5 m x 1.7 m x 2.1 m (solar panels span of 19.3 m)
- Power: 2.6 kW

Start of mission
- Launch date: 11 December 1988, 00:33:28 UTC
- Rocket: Ariane 44LP (V27)
- Launch site: Centre Spatial Guyanais, ELA-2
- Contractor: Arianespace
- Entered service: 5 February 1989

End of mission
- Disposal: Graveyard orbit
- Deactivated: December 2004

Orbital parameters
- Reference system: Geocentric orbit
- Regime: Geostationary orbit
- Longitude: 19.2° East (1989–2001); 19.4° East (2001); 5.2° East (2001–2004)

Transponders
- Band: 16 Ku-band (45 watts)
- Bandwidth: 26 MHz
- Coverage area: Western Europe

Astra 1A was the first satellite launched and operated by SES (Société Européenne des Satellites), launched in December 1988. During its early days, it was often referred to as the Astra Satellite, as SES only operated one satellite originally. The satellite provided 16 transponders(+6 as rescue) and television coverage to Western Europe from 1989 to 2004. Astra 1A was retired and became derelict in December 2004.

== Channels ==
Among the channels carried in the early years after launch were the entire four channel Sky Television (later British Sky Broadcasting, after the merger with rival British Satellite Broadcasting on the Marcopolo satellite), the services consisted of Sky Channel, Sky News, Sky Movies and Eurosport, the Scandinavian TV3 and TV1000, the German Pro7, Sat.1, RTL plus, 3sat and Teleclub, the Dutch RTL 4 as well as FilmNet, Screensport, MTV Europe, The Children's Channel and Lifestyle.

Astra 1A began television broadcasts on 5 February 1989. Until 1998 all of SES' satellites were co-located with Astra 1A at 19.2° East, leading that position to be known mostly as Astra 1 (later, Astra 19.2°E).

== History ==
The satellite came into its position on 7 January 1989. FilmNet became the first channel on the satellite when it launched on transponder 11 on 1 February 1989. Other channels such as Sky Channel, Eurosport, Sky News and Sky Movies from Sky Television, as well as the Scandinavian TV3 (Sweden) and MTV Europe all launched in February 1989. The Children's Channel/Lifestyle and Screensport followed in March 1989. The Scandinavian pay channel TV1000 launched in August 1989.

Sky Television had originally planned to launch The Disney Channel and Sky Arts on the Astra satellite in 1989, but these plans failed to materialize. The transponders intended for these channels, were used for Eurosport and the Dutch RTL Veronique (which would later become RTL4), respectively. The first German language programmes, RTL plus, Sat.1 and Pro 7 all launched on 8 December 1989. With the launch of 3sat in March 1990 and Teleclub in June 1990 all transponders were occupied.

Lifestyle was replaced by VOX in January 1993. Soon thereafter, Screensport merged with Eurosport and its transponder was replaced by RTL2. RTL 4 moved to Astra 1D in 1995 and was replaced by Super RTL. Teleclub was replaced by Kabel 1 during the same year. TV3 and TV1000 left Astra in 1996 and their transponders were taken over by BSkyB who used them for Fox Kids/Sky Two and Granada Plus/Granada Men & Motors. Filmnet also left in 1996, to be replaced by Bloomberg Germany in 1997. BSkyB ended their analogue service in 2001, which meant that its services closed down. By the end of 2001, the satellite was moved from 19.2° East to serve few years at 5.2° East.

On 19.2° East, the satellite was replaced by Astra 1F. Many channels, including RTL II, RTL, Eurosport, VOX, Sat.1, Kabel Eins, Super RTL and ProSieben were still broadcasting in analogue on the same frequencies in 2009.

In December 2004, Astra 1A was moved into a "graveyard orbit" after some time at 5.2° East providing data services.

== Technical issues ==
As with all GE Astro Space manufactured satellites, the AS-4000 Ku-band satellite design was used for the spacecraft bus, propulsion, thermal protection and solar array, the thermal protection made to protect Astra 1A's 16 transponder payload on board from the Sun's solar wind and cosmic rays.

While never confirmed by SES, Astra 1A is believed to have experienced a number of technical problems throughout its lifetime, including overheating and power system anomalies. After the launch of Astra 1C in 1993, two transponders (4 and 15) were moved from Astra 1A to Astra 1C. Transponder 1 was also moved to Astra 1F after its launch, leaving 13 operational transponders on Astra 1A in the late 1990s. Between February and April 1999, transponder 10 was also moved to Astra 1F.

In mid-1999, the satellite experienced a loss of power which reduced its usable payload to 6 transponders. Transponders 3, 7, 8, 11, 12 and 16 remained on Astra 1A while the others were transferred to Astra 1F; Astra 1C continued to carry transponders 4 and 15 as before. Documentation provided by SES since this event stated the usable payload as 5/6 transponders.

== Transponders ==
Transponder	Frequency	Channels carried
1	11,214 H	Screensport (1989–1993), RTL2 (1993–2012)
2	11,229 V	RTL (1989–2012)
3	11,244 H	TV3 Sweden (1989–1996), Granada Plus/Granada Men & Motors (1996–2001), RTL Shop (2001–2009)
4	11,259 V	Eurosport (1989–2012)
5	11,273 H	Lifestyle/The Children's Channel (1989–1993), VOX/The Quantum Channel (1993–1999), Vox (1999-2012)
6	11,288 V	Sat.1 (1989–2012)
7	11,303 H	TV1000 (1989–1996), Sky2 (1996–1997), Fox Kids (1997–2001), Viva Zwei (2001), Viva Plus, (2002–2007)
8	11,318 V	Sky One (1989–2001)
9	11,332 H	Eurosport (1989), Teleclub (1990–1995), Kabel 1 (1995–2012)
10	11,347 V	3sat (1990–2012)
11	11,362 H	FilmNet (1989–1997), Adult Channel (1997), Bloomberg UK (1997–1998), Sky Box Office 3 (1998–2000), Bloomberg DE (2000–2008)
12	11,377 V	Sky News (1989–2001)
13	11,391 H	RTL-V (1989–1990), RTL 4 (1990–1995), Super RTL (1995–2012)
14	11,406 V	Pro Sieben (1989–2012)
15	11,421 H	MTV Europe (1989–1997), MTV UK & Ireland (1997–2001), MTV 2 POP (2001–2005)
16	11,436 V	Sky Movies (1989–1997), Sky Movies Screen 1 (1997–1998), Sky Moviemax (1998–2001), Fox News (2001–2002)
