= K1010 TV =

Programming
- Picture format: 576i (4:3 SDTV)

Ownership
- Owner: K1010 Entertainment GmbH

History
- Launched: 1 April 2004; 22 years ago
- Closed: 31 October 2006; 19 years ago (2 years, 213 days)
- Replaced by: Juwelo TV

K1010 TV was a short-lived German call-in TV station headquartered in Berlin. K1010 TV, based on the website of the same name, launched in 2004.

K1010 TV differed from most other call-in TV stations. It featured quiz shows where callers could complete rounds which became progressively more difficult, earning more money for every round completed. While the caller could choose to stop after every round, if they lost they would win no money. The various quiz shows were rather challenging, for example, the Newsquiz asked questions on current affairs. These quiz shows were also broadcast on other TV stations, like n-tv.

Due to a very poor distribution in cable TV networks and the subsequent lack of callers, K1010 TV was forced to close in 2006, just two years after its opening. It was replaced by the shopping TV station Gems TV, which later became Juwelo TV.
