= Sonnenklar.TV =

German TV channel

sonnenklar.TV
- Country: Germany
- Headquarters: Munich, Germany

Programming
- Language(s): German
- Picture format: 576i (16:9 SDTV); 1080i (HDTV)

Ownership
- Owner: Euvia Travel GmbH

History
- Launched: 1 March 2003; 22 years ago

Links
- Website: www.sonnenklar.tv

sonnenklar.TV is a German private broadcaster based in Munich (since June 2010, previously Ludwigsburg). sonnenklar.TV broadcasts daily, between 9 am and 11 pm, telemarketing ads for leisure vacations. Euvia Travel GmbH is responsible for the production of sonnenklar.TV. In the fiscal year 2013/14 sonnenklar.TV achieved sales of €229.6 million.

The live broadcasts of sonnenklar.TV amount to about 60 hours per week. The program can be received on the same channel 24 hours a day via cable and satellite and is offered as a live stream on the internet.
