= Astra 1N =

Communications satellite

- Mission type: Communications
- Operator: SES
- COSPAR ID: 2011-041A
- SATCAT no.: 37775
- Website: https://www.ses.com/
- Mission duration: 15 years (planned); 14 years, 6 months, 5 days (elapsed)

Spacecraft properties
- Spacecraft type: Eurostar
- Bus: Eurostar-3000
- Manufacturer: Astrium (now Airbus Defence and Space)
- Launch mass: 5,350 kg (11,790 lb)
- Power: 13 kW

Start of mission
- Launch date: 6 August 2011, 22:52:37 UTC
- Rocket: Ariane 5ECA (VA203)
- Launch site: Centre Spatial Guyanais, ELA-3
- Contractor: Arianespace
- Entered service: 24 October 2011

Orbital parameters
- Reference system: Geocentric orbit
- Regime: Geostationary orbit
- Longitude: 19.2° East

Transponders
- Band: 55 Ku-band
- Bandwidth: 26 and 33 MHz
- Coverage area: Europe

Astra 1N is one of the Astra communications satellites owned and operated by SES and is positioned at the Astra 19.2°E orbital position. It was launched in 2011 and is the fourth satellite to be built for Astra by Astrium (now Airbus Defence and Space) and the 46th SES satellite in orbit, and entered commercial service at 28.2° East on 24 October 2011.

== Satellite description ==
The satellite was originally designed to provide digital television and radio broadcast services across Europe from the Astra 19.2°E position, in particular the German, French and Spanish markets, alongside the Astra 1KR, Astra 1L, and Astra 1M satellites already operating there. However, it was originally launched to the Astra 28.2°E position as a temporary replacement for Astra 2D. Following the launch of Astra 2E, Astra 1N was relocated to its intended position at 19.2°E.

== Broadcasting footprint ==
The Astra 1N satellite provides three broadcast beams, each with horizontal and vertical polarisation, across three footprints. The United Kingdom spot beam covers the United Kingdom and Ireland with reception on dishes of 45 cm diameter across the whole of the United Kingdom, Ireland and Channel Islands with the exception of the extreme north east of Scotland, where a 60 cm dish is required.

The Pan-European Beam 1 provides reception on a 60 cm dish across Western and Central Europe including Sardinia in the south but excluding Finland in the North. Pan-European Beam 2 provides 60 cm dish reception over substantially the same area reaching further north into Scandinavia and east as far as the Baltic states, Russia and the Black Sea but excluding more of the Iberian Peninsula, Italy and the Mediterranean.

== See also ==
- Astra 1KR co-located satellite
- Astra 1L co-located satellite
- Astra 1M co-located satellite
- Astra 2C previously co-located satellite
- Astra 19.2°E orbital position
- Astra 28.2°E previous orbital position
- SES (operator)
- Astra satellite family
