= Astra 2C =

Communications satellite

- Mission type: Communications
- Operator: SES
- COSPAR ID: 2001-025A
- SATCAT no.: 26853
- Website: https://www.ses.com/
- Mission duration: 15 years (planned); Final: 26 years and 6 months

Spacecraft properties
- Spacecraft type: Boeing 601
- Bus: BSS 601 HP
- Manufacturer: Boeing Satellite Systems
- Launch mass: 3,643 kg (8,031 lb)
- Power: 7.0 kW

Start of mission
- Launch date: 16 June 2001, 01:49:00 UTC
- Rocket: Proton-K / DM-03
- Launch site: Baikonur, Site 81/23
- Contractor: Khrunichev State Research and Production Space Center
- Entered service: August 2001

End of mission
- Disposal: Graveyard orbit
- Deactivated: June 2024

Orbital parameters
- Reference system: Geocentric orbit
- Regime: Geostationary orbit
- Longitude: Astra 19.2°E (2001–2007); Astra 28.2°E (2007–2009); Astra 31.5°E (2009–2010); Astra 19.2°E (2010–2014); Astra 28.2°E (2014–2015); 60.5° East (2015–2018); Astra 23.5°E (2018-2021); 72.5°W (2021-2024)

Transponders
- Band: 32 Ku-band
- Bandwidth: 33 MHz
- Coverage area: Europe

Astra 2C is one of the Astra communications satellites owned and operated by SES. Designed to join Astra 2A and Astra 2B at the Astra 28.2°E orbital position providing digital television and radio broadcast services to the United Kingdom and Ireland, the satellite was first used after launch in 2001 at 19.2° East for pan-European coverage.

The satellite provides one broadcast beam with horizontal and vertical polarisation, across a single footprint covering the areas of Central and Eastern Europe, Scandinavia, the Iberian Peninsula and Canary Islands.

TV signals can be received with a 50 cm dish across the majority of the British Isles with a 60 cm dish required in the extreme north and west. Astra 2C can also provide backup capacity, substituting for one or more transponders across the 10.70-12.20 GHz broadcast range used by Astra satellites in the Astra 19.2°E and Astra 28.2°E orbital positions.

== History ==
Although originally intended for Astra 28.2° East, the satellite has spent little of its life in that orbital position, stationed at Astra 19.2° East and Astra 31.5°E for some 11 years for pan-European coverage. Positioned at 28.2° East for just 19 months from August 2007 and for 16 months from March 2014, Astra 2C was then moved to 60.5° East in August 2015 In April–May 2018, it was moved for the first time to the Astra 23.5°E slot. In 2021, Astra 2C was moved to 72.5°W and in June 2024 it was retired to a graveyard orbit.

=== Temporary use at 19.2°E ===
Astra 2C was first positioned at 19.2° East after launch in 2001, to provide pan-European capacity at the primary Astra position pending the launch of Astra 1L (in May 2007) and was moved to 28.2° East in August 2007, transmitting digital TV and interactive services for Sky Digital and Freesat. Only two transponders were active during this time.

The satellite was returned to 19.2° East in September 2010 while Astra 1N, which was intended for positioning at Astra 19.2° East, was used at Astra 28.2° East. As of July 2012, there are 16 transponders active, in particular six for the Spanish Canal+ pay-TV platform and five for Sky Deutschland.

Astra 2C was returned to its originally intended position at Astra 28.2° East after the relocation of Astra 1N from 28.2° East to 19.2° East in March 2014.

=== Temporary use at 31.5° East ===
In March 2009, SES announced that in April 2009, Astra 2C was to be moved from 28.2° East to Astra 31.5°E to temporarily replace the failed Astra 5A until Astra 3B was launched to Astra 23.5°E, when another craft currently there could be released to Astra 31.5° East. The move of Astra 2C was started in early May 2009 and completed on 11 May 2009, with the first transponders coming into use at the new position in the subsequent two weeks.

In June 2010, Astra 3B (launched May 2010) came into operation at Astra 23.5° East and Astra 1G was moved from that position to Astra 31.5° East, where it could release take over all broadcasting activity from Astra 2C. Astra 2C left 31.5° East in September 2010.

== See also ==
- Astra 23.5°E – current orbital position
- Astra 28.2°E – previous orbital position
- Astra 19.2°E – previous orbital position
- Astra 31.5°E – previous orbital position
- Astra 2A
- Astra 2B
- Astra 2D
- Astra 2E
- Astra 2F
- Astra 2G
- SES (operator)
- Astra satellite family
