= TV Shop =

European shopping channel

Ownership
- Owner: Stratos AG
- Sister channels: -

History
- Launched: 1998

Links
- Website: Official site

TV Shop is a teleshopping channel broadcasting 24 hours a day. It became famous in Europe by being one of the earliest free-to-air (FTA) channels on the Astra satellite. The service was initially set up by Modern Times Group but in 2007 was sold to American teleshopping giant Guthy Renker. Guthy Renker then sold the brand TV Shop in 2016 to the current owner Stratos AG.
