= Astra 1L =

Communications satellite

- Mission type: Communications
- Operator: SES
- COSPAR ID: 2007-016A
- SATCAT no.: 31306
- Website: https://www.ses.com/
- Mission duration: 15 years (planned); 17 years, 10 months, 27 days (elapsed)

Spacecraft properties
- Spacecraft type: Lockheed Martin A2100
- Bus: A2100AXS
- Manufacturer: Lockheed Martin
- Launch mass: 4,497 kg (9,914 lb)
- Dry mass: 2,253 kg (4,967 lb)

Start of mission
- Launch date: 4 May 2007, 22:29 UTC
- Rocket: Ariane 5ECA (V176)
- Launch site: Centre Spatial Guyanais, ELA-3
- Contractor: Arianespace
- Entered service: July 2007

Orbital parameters
- Reference system: Geocentric orbit
- Regime: Geostationary orbit
- Longitude: 19.2° East (2007-2025); 19.4° East (2025-)

Transponders
- Band: 31 transponders: 29 Ku-band; 2 Ka-band
- Coverage area: Europe

Astra 1L, is one of the Astra geostationary satellites owned and operated by SES. It was purchased in June 2003, launched in May 2007 and stationed at SES's primary European TV orbital position at 19.2° East.

Starting in February 2025, following Astra 1P's launch (June 2024) and start of service at 19.2° East (January 2025), all broadcast channels were moved off Astra 1L to Astra 1P in preparation for Astra 1L's retirement, and the satellite was moved to 19.4° East in March 2025.

== Launch ==
It was launched on 4 May 2007, at 22:29 UTC by an Ariane 5ECA from Centre Spatial Guyanais at Kourou, French Guiana.

== Satellite description ==
The satellite is based on the A2100AXS satellite bus, manufactured by Lockheed Martin Commercial Space Systems, Newtown, Pennsylvania, and has a minimum service life of 15 years. It features 29 Ku-band and 2 Ka-band transponders to service Europe. SES stated that Astra 1L would replace Astra 2C.

== See also ==
- SES (satellite operator)
- Astra (satellite family)
- Astra 19.2°E (orbital position)
- Astra 1KR co-located satellite
- Astra 1M co-located satellite
- Astra 1N co-located satellite
- Astra 2C previously co-located satellite
