= Astra 2A =

Communications satellite

- Mission type: Communications
- Operator: SES
- COSPAR ID: 1998-050A
- SATCAT no.: 25462
- Website: https://www.ses.com/
- Mission duration: 15 years (planned); Final: 26 years and 9 months

Spacecraft properties
- Spacecraft type: Boeing 601
- Bus: HS-601HP
- Manufacturer: Hughes Space and Communications
- Launch mass: 3,635 kg (8,014 lb)
- Power: 6 kW

Start of mission
- Launch date: 30 August 1998, 00:31:00 UTC
- Rocket: Proton-K / DM-03
- Launch site: Baikonur, Site 81/23
- Contractor: Khrunichev State Research and Production Space Center
- Entered service: October 1998

End of mission
- Disposal: Graveyard orbit
- Deactivated: May 2025

Orbital parameters
- Reference system: Geocentric orbit
- Regime: Geostationary orbit
- Longitude: Astra 28.2°E (1998-2016); 113.5°E (2016-2018); 100°E (2018-2020); Astra 28.2°E (2020-2022); 57.2°E (2022-25)

Transponders
- Band: 32 Ku-band
- Bandwidth: 33 MHz
- Coverage area: Europe

Astra 2A was one of the Astra communications satellites owned by SES. Launched in 1998 into the 28.2° East orbital position, half its expected end-of-life capacity of 28 transponders were pre-booked by BSkyB, to launch the new Sky Digital service. The satellite was retired after more than 26 years.

== History ==
The satellite suffered pre-launch technical issues with its apogee motors and was moved to a launch by the Proton-K / DM-03 rather than the Ariane 5, as the Proton can inject directly in geostationary orbit (GEO).

When positioned at 28.2 East, it joined DFS Kopernikus-1, which served mainly Eastern Europe. The satellite was the first of Astra's craft to never carry analogue television services (with the exception of a solitary test card in 1999), and as of 2006, carried standard definition digital television, digital radio, and high-definition digital television, as well as Sky Interactive streams and the AVC Broadband and Silvermead satellite Internet services. Two beams "2A North" and "2A South" transmitted on horizontal and vertical polarisation, with the South beam covering almost all of Europe, and the North beam covering only Northern Europe at a high power.

In March 2015, two years beyond Astra 2A's projected lifespan, and following the launches of Astra 2E in 2013, Astra 2F in 2012, and Astra 2G in 2014 to 28.2° East, all remaining traffic was transferred from Astra 2A to the newer satellites. From 25 March 2015, Astra 2A remained at 28.2° East, inactive, and was expected to be moved to Astra 23.5°E to operate as a backup satellite to Astra 3B but in the summer of 2016 it was instead moved to 113.5°E. In July 2018, Astra 2A started moving west at approximately 0.6°/day to arrive at its new position of 100° East in August 2018. In May 2020, Astra 2A started moving west at approx 0.8°/day. and in the autumn 2020, it was back at 28.2°E. The satellite was moved to 57.2°E in 2022 Since May 2025, Astra 2A has been non-operational and drifting west at approximately 5.8°/day.

== See also ==
- Astra 2E
- Astra 2F
- Astra 2G
- Astra 2B
- Astra 2C
- Astra 2D
- Astra 28.2°E main lifetime orbital position
