= Satellite dish =

Type of parabolic antenna

A satellite dish is a dish-shaped type of parabolic antenna designed to receive or transmit information by radio waves to or from a communication satellite. The term most commonly means a dish which receives direct-broadcast satellite television from a direct broadcast satellite in geostationary orbit.

== History ==
Parabolic or "dish" antennas had been in use as radio telescopes (beginning in 1937) and airplane tracking by the military (during WWII) long before the first artificial satellite was launched in 1957.

The term satellite dish was coined in 1978 during the beginning of the satellite television industry, and came to refer to dish antennas that send and/or receive signals from communications satellites. Taylor Howard of San Andreas, California, adapted an ex-military dish in 1976 and became the first person to receive satellite television signals using it.

The first satellite television dishes were built to receive signals on the C-band analog, and were very large. The front cover of the 1979 Neiman-Marcus Christmas catalog featured the first home satellite TV stations on sale. The dishes were nearly 20 feet (6.1 m) in diameter. The satellite dishes of the early 1980s were 10 to 16 feet (3.0 to 4.9 m) in diameter and made of fiberglass with an embedded layer of wire mesh or aluminium foil, or solid aluminium or steel.

Satellite dishes made of wire mesh first came out in the early 1980s, and were at first 10 feet (3.0 m) in diameter. As the front-end technology improved and the noise figure of the LNBs fell, the size shrank to 8 feet (2.4 m) a few years later, and continued to get smaller reducing to 6 feet (1.8 m) feet by the late 1980s and 4 feet (1.2 m) by the early 1990s. Larger dishes continued to be used, however. In December 1988, Luxembourg's Astra 1A satellite began transmitting analog television signals on the K_{u} band for the European market. This allowed small dishes (90 cm) to be used reliably for the first time.

In the early 1990s, four large American cable companies founded PrimeStar, a direct broadcasting company using medium power satellites. The relatively strong K_{u} band transmissions allowed the use of dishes as small as 90 cm for the first time. On 4 March 1996, EchoStar introduced Digital Sky Highway (Dish Network). This was the first widely used direct-broadcast satellite television system and allowed dishes as small as 20 inches (51 cm) to be used. This great decrease of dish size also allowed satellite dishes to be installed on vehicles. Dishes this size are still in use today. Television stations, however, still prefer to transmit their signals on the C-band with large dishes due to the fact that C-band signals are less prone to rain fade than K_{u} band signals.

== Principle of operation ==
Schematics of reflection principles used in parabolic antennas

The parabolic shape of a dish reflects the signal to the dish's focal point. Mounted on brackets at the dish's focal point is a device called a feedhorn. This feedhorn is essentially the front-end of a waveguide that gathers the signals at or near the focal point and 'conducts' them to a low-noise block downconverter or LNB. The LNB converts the signals from electromagnetic or radio waves to electrical signals and shifts the signals from the downlinked C-band and/or K_{u}-band to the L-band range. Direct broadcast satellite dishes use an LNBF, which integrates the feedhorn with the LNB. A new form of omnidirectional satellite antenna, which does not use a directed parabolic dish and can be used on a mobile platform such as a vehicle was announced by the University of Waterloo in 2004.

The theoretical gain (directive gain) of a dish increases as the frequency increases. The actual gain depends on many factors including surface finish, accuracy of shape, feedhorn matching. A typical value for a consumer type 60 cm satellite dish at 11.75 GHz is 37.50 dB.

With lower frequencies, C-band for example, dish designers have a wider choice of materials. The large size of dish required for lower frequencies led to the dishes being constructed from metal mesh on a metal framework. At higher frequencies, mesh type designs are rarer though some designs have used a solid dish with perforations.

A common misconception is that the LNBF (low-noise block/feedhorn), the device at the front of the dish, receives the signal directly from the atmosphere. For instance, one BBC News downlink shows a "red signal" being received by the LNBF directly instead of being beamed to the dish, which because of its parabolic shape will collect the signal into a smaller area and deliver it to the LNBF.

Modern dishes intended for home television use are generally 43 cm (18 in) to 80 cm (31 in) in diameter, and are fixed in one position, for Ku-band reception from one orbital position. Prior to the existence of direct broadcast satellite services, home users would generally have a motorised C-band dish of up to 3 m in diameter for reception of channels from different satellites. Overly small dishes can still cause problems, however, including rain fade and interference from adjacent satellites.

== Europe ==
In Europe, the frequencies used by DBS services are 10.7–12.75 GHz on two polarisations H (Horizontal) and V (Vertical). This range is divided into a "low band" with 10.7–11.7 GHz, and a "high band" with 11.7–12.75 GHz. This results in two frequency bands, each with a bandwidth of about 1 GHz, each with two possible polarizations. In the LNB they become down converted to 950–2150 MHz, which is the frequency range allocated for the satellite service on the coaxial cable between LNBF and receiver. Lower frequencies are allocated to cable and terrestrial TV, FM radio, etc. Only one of these frequency bands fits on the coaxial cable, so each of these bands needs a separate cable from the LNBF to a switching matrix or the receiver needs to select one of the 4 possibilities at a time.

== Systems design ==
In a single receiver residential installation there is a single coaxial cable running from the receiver set-top box in the building to the LNB on the dish. The DC electric power for the LNB is provided through the same coaxial cable conductors that carry the signal to the receiver. In addition, control signals are also transmitted from the receiver to the LNB through the cable. The receiver uses different power supply voltages (13 / 18 V) to select vertical / horizontal antenna polarization, and an on/off pilot tone (22 kHz) to instruct the LNB to select one of the two frequency bands. In larger installations each band and polarization is given its own cable, so there are 4 cables from the LNB to a 'multiswitch' switching matrix, which allows the connection of multiple receivers to the multiswitch in a star topology using the same signalling method as in a single receiver installation.

=== Satellite finder ===
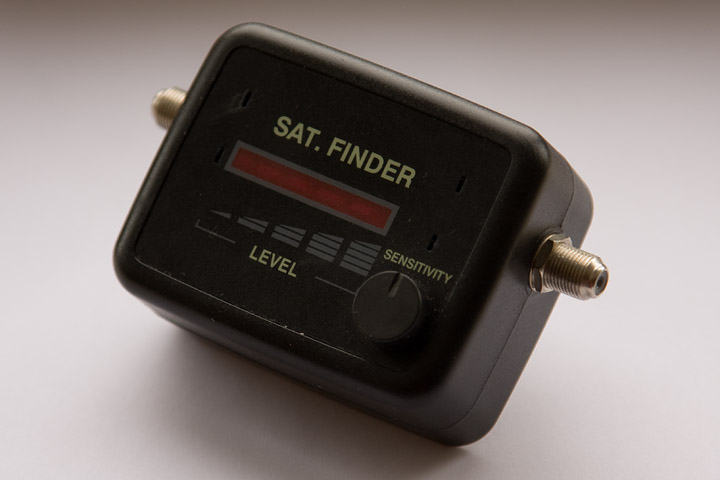
Sat finder

A satellite finder (or sat finder) is a satellite field strength meter used to accurately point satellite dishes at communications satellites in geostationary orbit. Professional satellite finder meters allow better dish alignment and provide received signal parameter values as well.

== Types ==
=== Motor-driven dish ===
A dish that is mounted on a pole and driven by a stepper motor or a servo can be controlled and rotated to face any satellite position in the sky. There are three competing standards: DiSEqC, USALS, and 36 V positioners. Many receivers support all of these standards.

Motor-driven dishes come in a variety of sizes, but a dish of at least 120 centimetres (47 in) is required to receive signals from distant satellites which are intended to serve other areas.

With DiSEqC and USALS, the satellite dish will automatically aim itself at one of sixteen satellites programmed in previously when pressing one of the channel buttons on the remote. Motor-driven satellite dishes using USALS can detect other satellites in a constellation after one has been found and aimed at.

Most receivers sold at present are compatible with USALS and DiSEqC 1.0 and 1.2.

=== Multi-satellite ===
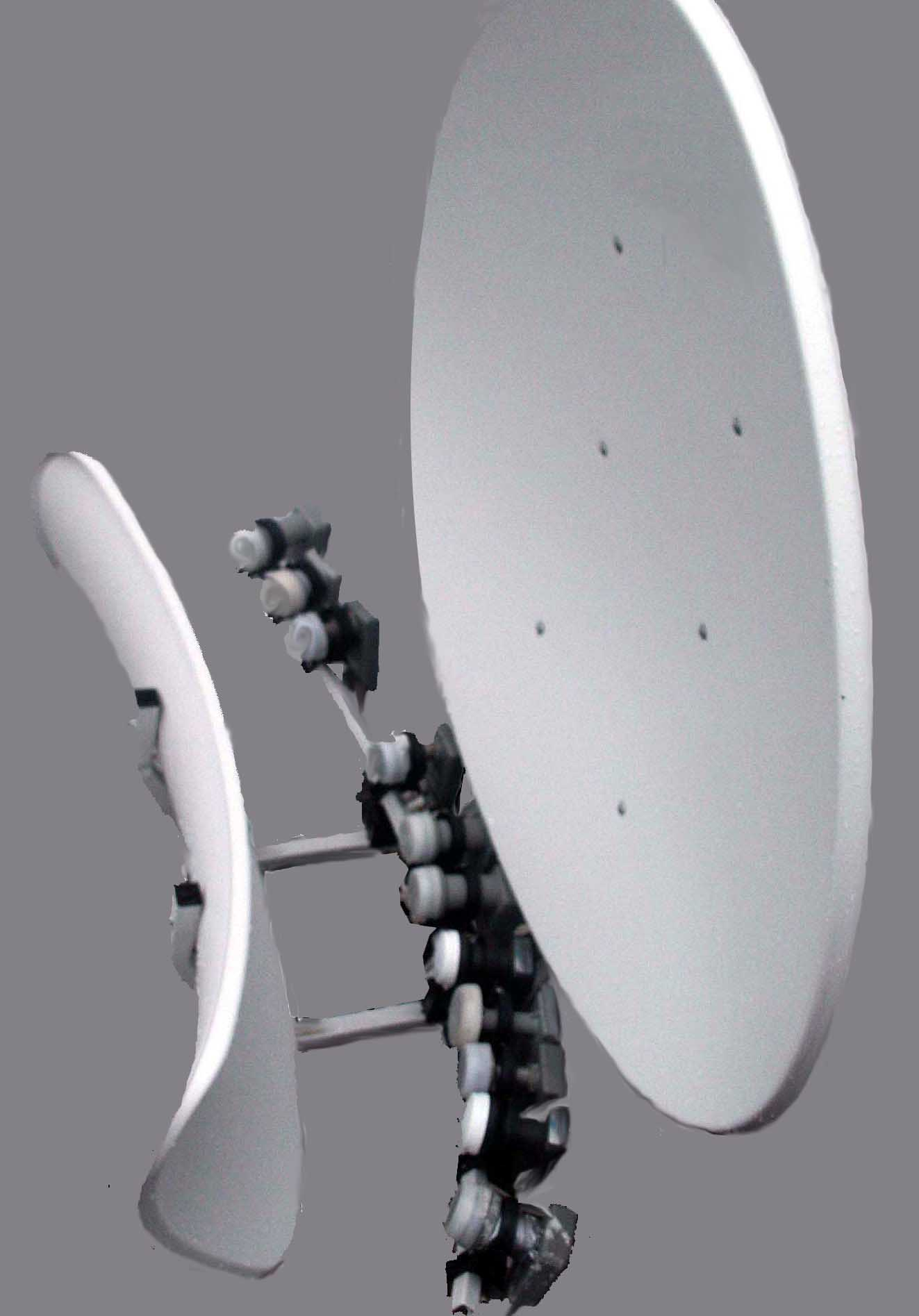
Special dish for up to 16 satellite positions (K_{u}-band)

Every standard-size dish enables simultaneous reception from multiple different satellite positions without re-positioning the dish, just by adding additional LNB or using special duo LNB, or triple- or four-feed monoblock LNB.

However, some designs much more effectively optimize simultaneous reception from multiple different satellite positions without re-positioning the dish. The vertical axis operates as an off-axis concave parabolic concave hyperbolic Cassegrain reflector, while the horizontal axis operates as a concave convex Cassegrain. The spot from the main dish wanders across the secondary, which corrects astigmatism by its varying curvature. The elliptic aperture of the primary is designed to fit the deformed illumination by the horns. Due to double spill-over, this makes more sense for a large dish.

Switching between satellites is possible by using DiSEqC switches added to a satellite installation, or built-in Duo LNBs or Monoblock LNBs.

Most receivers sold presently are compatible with at least DiSEqC 1.0, which can switch automatically between 4 satellites (all of contemporary Monoblock LNBs) as the user changes channels using the remote control.

DiSEqC 1.1 allows for switching automatically between 16 satellite positions or more (through cascading switches).

Motor-driven dishes assure better optimal focusing for the given dish size; LNB is always in central alignment with the broadcasting satellite, but DiSEqC switches are faster than DiSEqC motors as no physical movement is required.

=== VSAT ===
A common type of dish is the very small aperture terminal (VSAT). This provides two way satellite Internet communications for both individuals and private networks for organizations. At present, most VSATs operate in K_{u} band; C band is restricted to less populated regions of the world. In 2005, dish manufacturers began moving towards new K_{a} band satellites operating at higher frequencies, offering greater performance at lower cost. These antennas vary from 74 to 120 cm (29 to 47 in) in most applications though C-band VSATs may be as large as 4 m (13 ft).

=== Homemade dishes ===
Any metal surface which concentrates a significant fraction of the reflected microwaves at a focus can be used as a dish antenna, at a lower gain. This has led to trash can lids, woks, and other items being used as "dishes". Only modern low noise LNBs and the higher transmission power of DTH satellites allows a usable signal to be received from such inefficient DIY antennas.

=== Others ===
- Individual dishes serving one dwelling: Direct to Home (DTH).
- Collective dishes, shared by several dwellings: satellite master antenna television (SMATV) or communal antenna broadcast distribution (CABD).
- Automatic Tracking Satellite Dish

== Gallery ==
General Electric satellite dish for DirecTV satellite television.

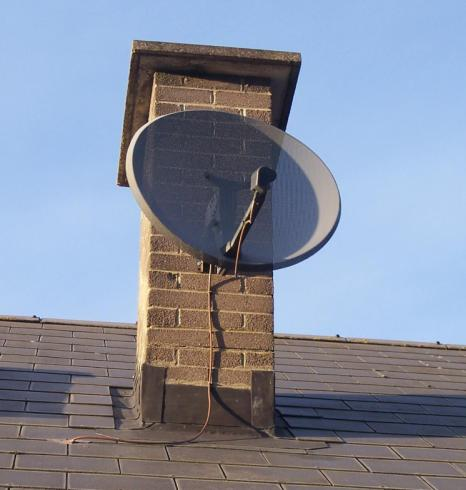
Sky "minidish".

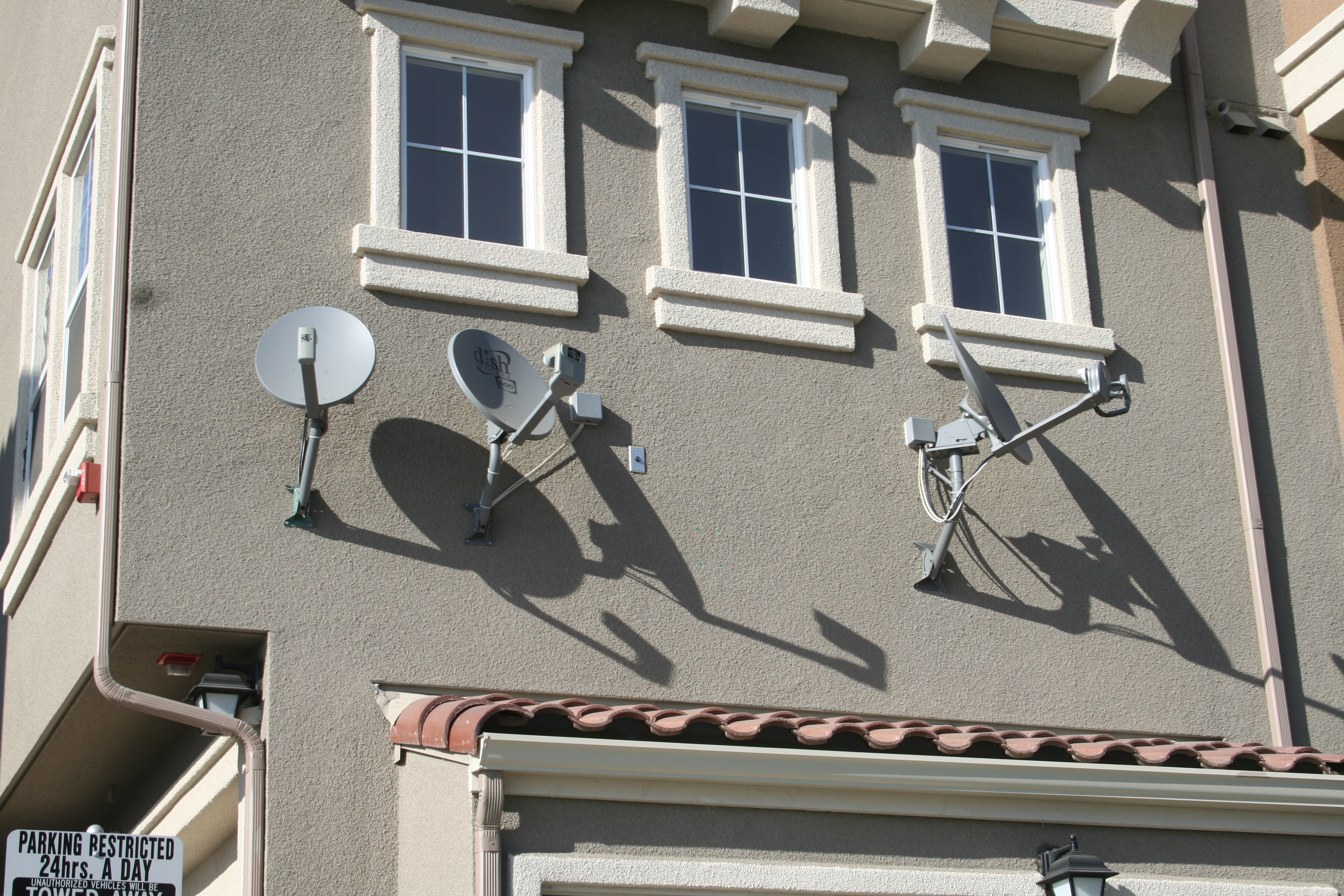
Satellite dishes installed on an apartment complex.

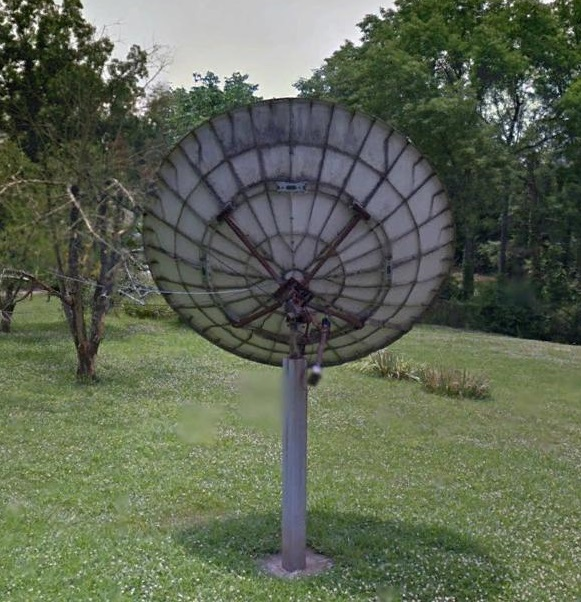
The back side of an old C-band satellite dish showing the pole, mount, motor, and structure of the dish.

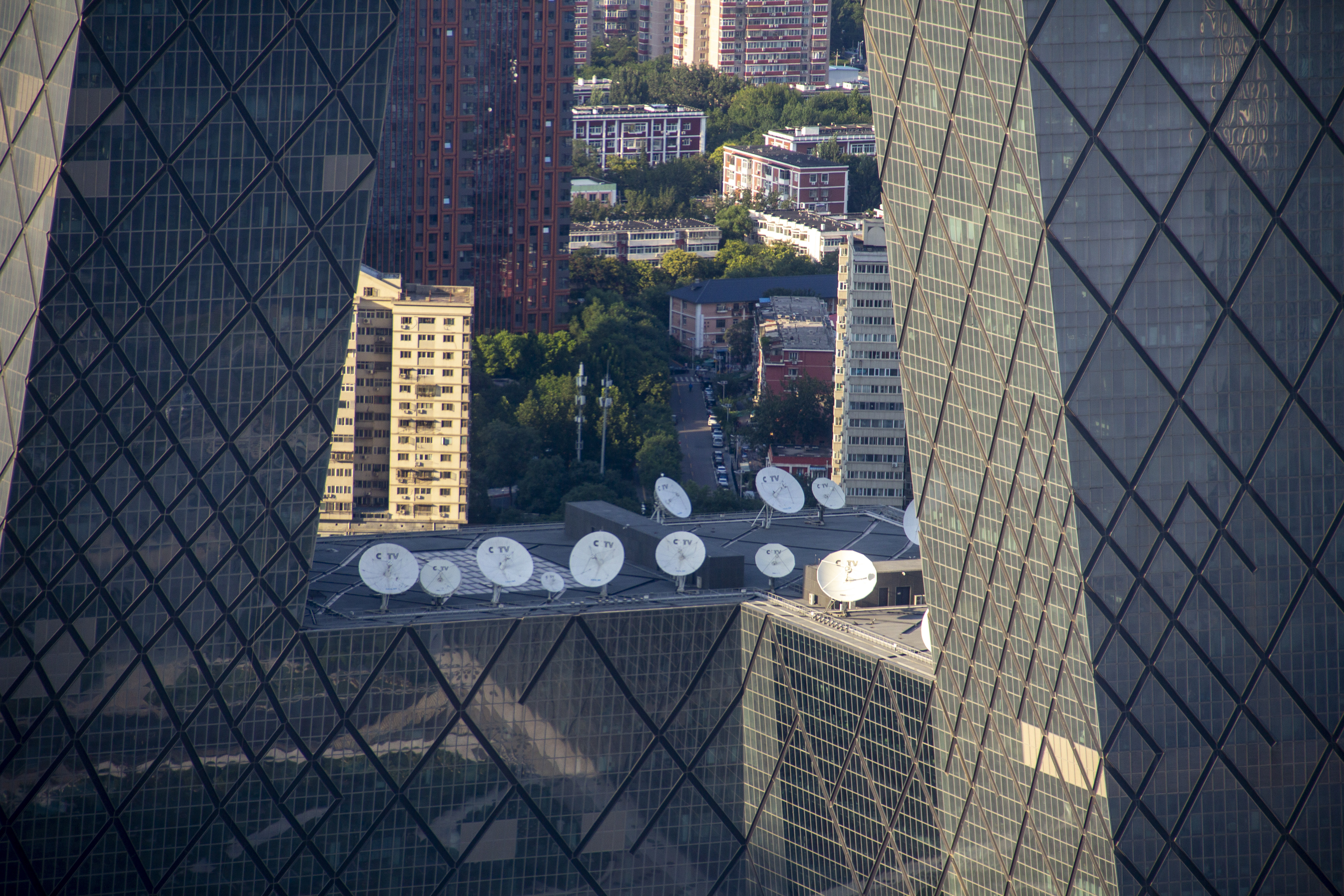
Satellite dishes above CCTV Headquarters.

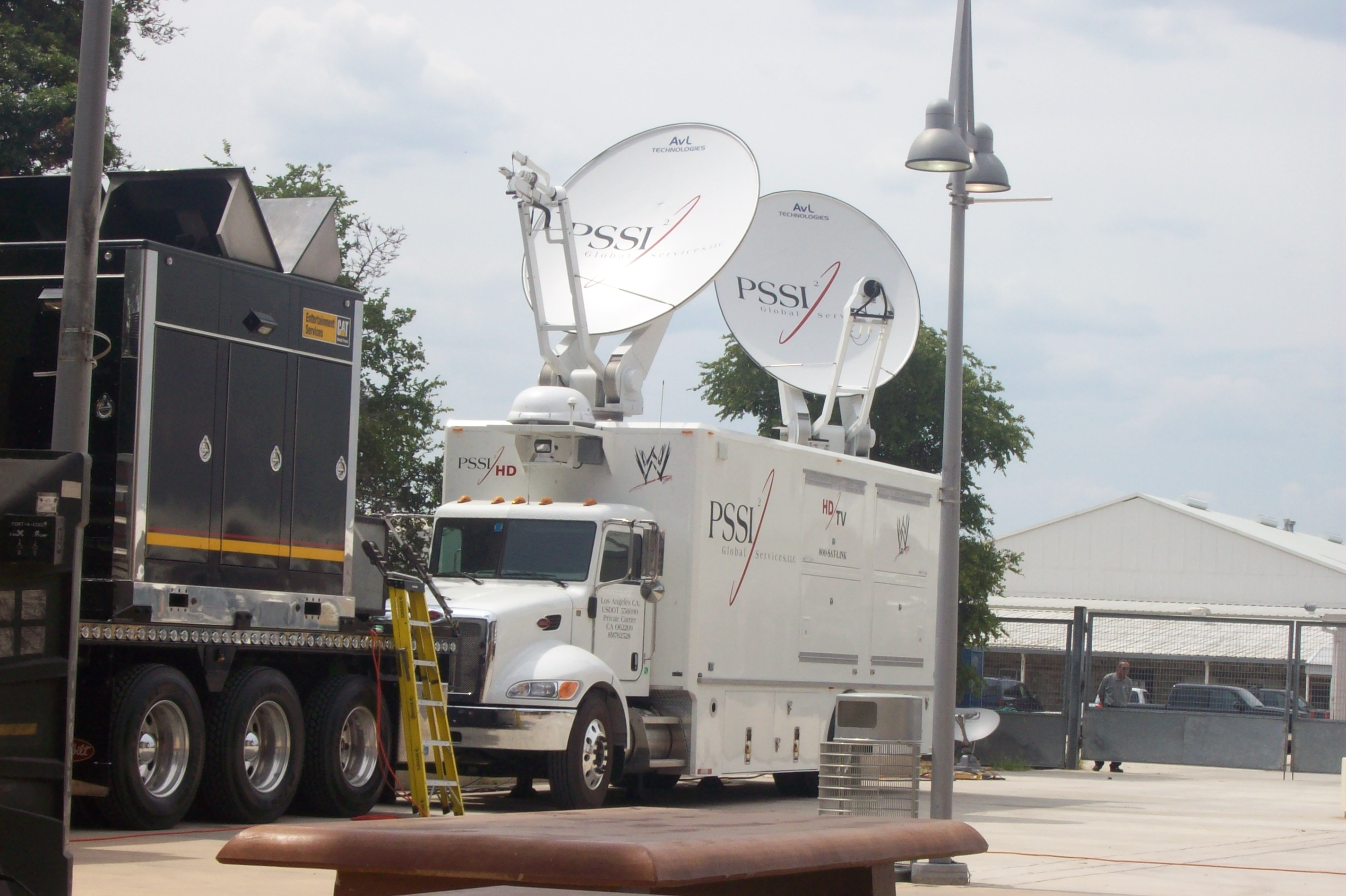
A WWE HD satellite truck in a parking lot.

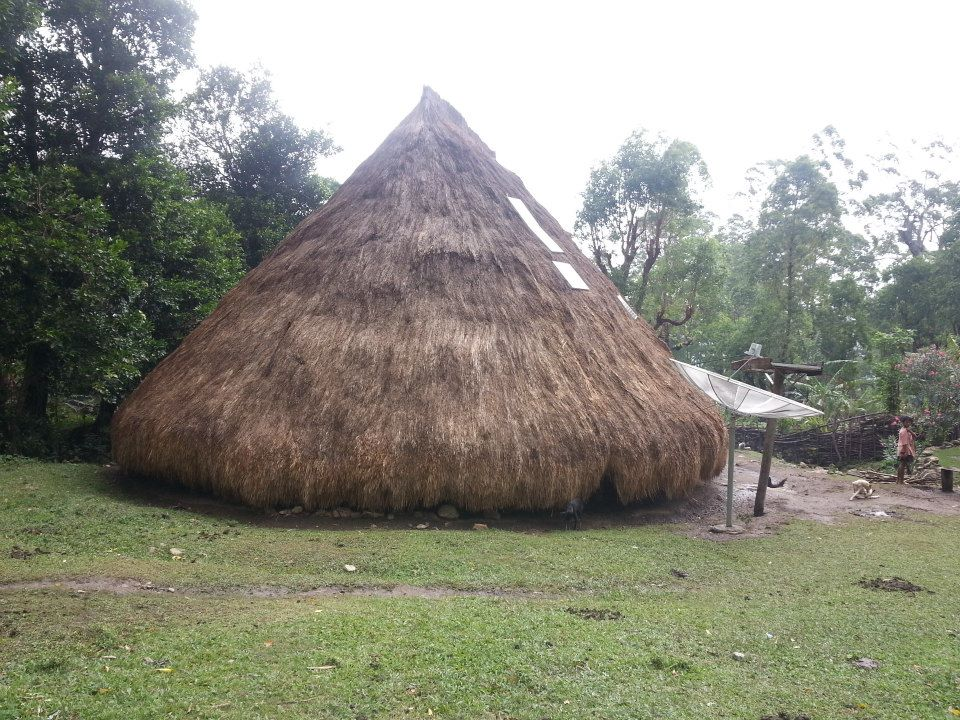
Satellite dish at a hut in East Timor.

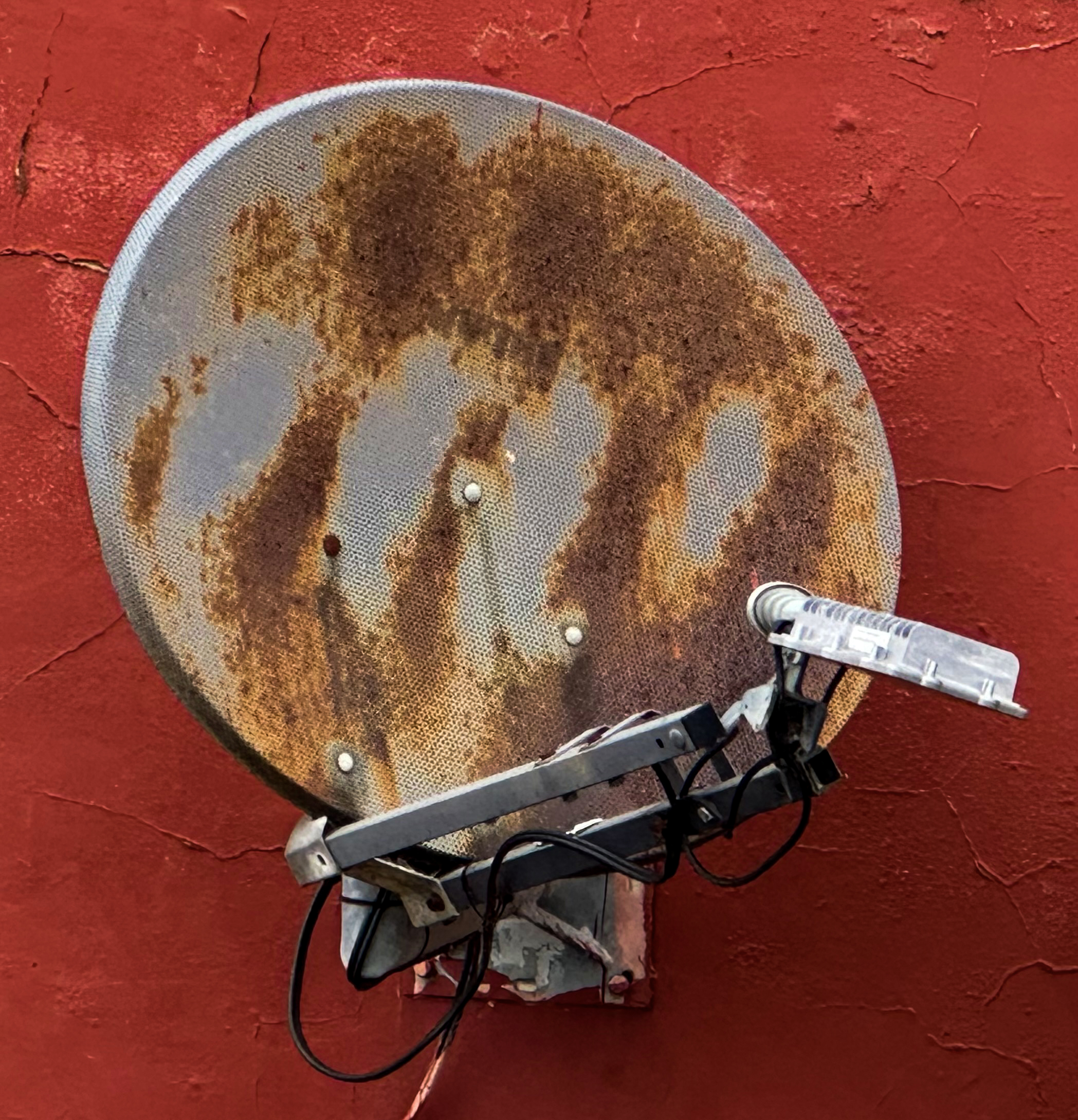
Rusty satellite dish on the side of a house in Gillingham, Kent, England.

== See also ==
- Free-to-air
- USALS = Universal Satellites Automatic Location System
- DiSEqC = Digital Satellite Equipment Control
- SAT>IP end user consumer equipment that can switch different ip streams from different SAT>IP servers and facilitates selection of reception from different satellites
- Satellite television
- Set-top box
- Parabolic reflector
- Low-noise block converter
- Automatic Tracking Satellite Dish
- Starlink Dish
