= ProgDVB =

- Developer(s): Prog
- Stable release: 7.65.1 / February 14, 2025; 6 months ago
- Operating system: Windows/IoS/Android
- License: Freeware/Shareware
- Website: www.progdvb.com

ProgDVB is a freeware/shareware software used to watch digital TV channels and listen to radio on computers. It supports DVB-S (satellite), DVB-S2, DVB-C (cable), DVB-T (terrestrial) and IPTV sources.

Internet polls show that ProgDVB is the most popular program used to watch DVB TV.

== Editions ==
There is a freeware and a shareware edition of ProgDVB; the shareware edition adds:

- Picture-in-picture support
- Recorder and Scheduler
- Digital Satellite Equipment Control

Starting with version 5.x ProgDVB began using the .NET Framework for its GUI.
