= Universal Satellites Automatic Location System =

Universal Satellites Automatic Location System (USALS), also known (unofficially) as DiSEqC 1.3, Go X or Go to XX is a satellite dish motor protocol that automatically creates a list of available satellite positions in a motorised satellite dish setup. It is used in conjunction with the DiSEqC 1.2 protocol. It was developed by STAB, an Italian motor manufacturer, who still make the majority of USALS compatible motors.

Software on the satellite receiver (or external positioner) calculates the position of all available satellites from an initial location (input by the user), which is the latitude and longitude relative to Earth. Calculated positions can differ ±0.1 degrees from the offset. This is adjusted automatically and does not require previous technical knowledge.

Compared to DiSEqC 1.2, it is not necessary to manually search and store every known satellite position. Pointing to a known satellite position (for example 19.2ºE) is enough; this position will act as the central point, and the USALS system will then calculate visible satellites position within the offset.

Receivers are aligned to the satellite most southern to their position in the northern hemisphere, or the northernmost in the southern hemisphere.

As it is not an open standard, for a receiver to carry the USALS logo it must undergo a certification test by STAB's laboratories. If successful the manufacturer can include a USALS settings entry in its own menu, as well as place the logo on the front of their unit. However, a large number of manufacturers of both receivers and motors provide compatible modes which have not received certification, leading to use of unofficial terms.

USALS is a program and not a communication protocol. The USALS calculates the dish angular position given by the dish longitude/latitude and the position of the satellite in geostationary orbit. It then sends the angular position to the positioner using the DiSEqC 1.2 protocol. This calculation is straight on using geometric calculations.

== See also ==
- Antenna tracking system
- Automatic Tracking Satellite Dish
- Satellite finder
- DiSEqC = Digital Satellite Equipment Control
- Duo LNB
- Monoblock LNB
- SAT>IP ip based approach
