= Transmit and receive integrated assembly =

Part of a two-way satellite dish antenna

A transmit and receive integrated assembly (TRIA) is used on a two-way satellite dish to process signals to and from a ground-based system and an earth-orbiting satellite. The TRIA is the part of the antenna which contains both the feed horn and the circuits which convert high-frequency satellite signals such as X-band, Ku-band and Ka-band to and from the L-band microwave signals used for transmission between the dish and the customer-premises equipment.

== See also ==
- LNBF
- Block upconverter
