= Taylor Howard =

American scientist and radio engineer

H. Taylor Howard (April 5, 1932 – November 13, 2002) was an American scientist and radio engineer. Howard was a major player in the development of consumer satellite television in the US. In 1976, he demonstrated the possibility of receiving of TV signal from a communications satellite direct to the home of an ordinary householder, using a home-made satellite dish (actually a converted military surplus radar dish) and a self-designed and built analog satellite receiver. He co-founded San Jose, California-based Chaparral Communications. He was born in Peoria, Illinois.

Howard was a professor emeritus electrical engineering at Stanford University, and his career there spanned more than 50 years.

Howard, along with his stepson, died in 2002 when the plane that he was piloting crashed shortly after takeoff at Calaveras County Airport in California.
