= Monoblock LNB =

Type of low-noise block downconverter

Low-noise block downconverters (LNBs) are electronic devices coupled to satellite dishes for TV reception or general telecommunication that convert electromagnetic waves into digital signals that can be used to transform information into human or machine interpretable data, e.g., optical images, video, code, communications, etc.

Monoblock (or monobloc) low-noise block downconverters are a special type of LNBs representing a single device that contains several (typically 2–4) LNB units and a Digital Satellite Equipment Control (DiSEqC) switch. The latter allows the recipient to receive signals from several neighboring satellites each communicating different channels or signals which increases the potential bandwidth of the receiver.

The two, three, or four LNBs can be automatically addressed with any DiSEqC 1.0 or higher receiver. In some cases, they can also be addressed with ToneBurst/MiniDiSEqC. However, they are only available for satellites with a fixed 3-degree, 4°, 4.3°, or 6° outer spacing.

Most receivers which are commercially available are compatible with at least DiSeqC 1.0 allowing dynamic switching between 4 satellites (all of contemporary Monoblock LNBs), as the recipient manually switches settings, e.g., flipping channels using a TV remote control.

== Availability examples ==
In Europe, for example, there are monoblock single, twin, and quad LNBs for the K_{u} band, which have a pre-defined spacing of 6 degrees (for Astra 19.2°E/Hot Bird 13°E).

In March 2007, a new type of monoblock, called the Duo LNB was introduced by CanalDigitaal in the Netherlands for the simultaneous reception of Astra 19.2°E/Astra 23.5°E with a spacing of just 4.3 degrees. Unlike most other monoblocks, the Duo LNB was intended for use with 60 cm dishes, whereas most monoblocks may require a larger, 80 cm or 1 m dish.

The Duo LNB is available in twin and quad versions. Triple monoblock LNBs are available in single, twin, and quad versions.

There are also triple monoblock LNB units, which enable users to receive signals from three satellites. For example Hotbird 13°E, Eutelsat 16°E and Astra 19.2°E can be used for positions Eutelsat 7°E, Eutelsat 10°E, and Hotbird 13°E. This monoblock can also be used for other positions with the same spacing (3°+3°=6°spacing).

Other popular examples for different spacing are Astra 1: 19.2°E, Astra 3: 23.5°E and Astra 2: 28.2°E (4.3°+4.7°=9°spacing).

There are four feed monoblock LNB units that enable users to receive signals from four satellites, for example, Eurobird 9°E, Hotbird 13°E, Astra 19.2°E and Astra 23.5°E (4°+6.2°+4.3°=14.5°spacing).

== Multiband Monoblock ==
There are also existing Monoblock LNBs that combine K_{u}-band LNBs with one of the alternative bands LNBs. Examples of such bands include K_{a} band that is: K_{a}-band LNBs or C band that is: C-band LNBs.

== Multiple Monoblock on one and the same dish ==
Two monoblock LNB can be connected to one receiving dish using Multi-satellite techniques. However, the expected results of such connections may vary or be sub-optimal. The results may yield low-level signals from some or all of the satellites or it may work well in certain geographically favorable locations.

Monoblock LNBs can be connected by adding a DiSEqC switch with compatibility of cascading, or they can be connected directly to different satellite tuners, e.g., twin tuners with two separate inputs. However, placing several separate single-feed LNBs can lead to better results and more optimal signal levels.

== Future prospects ==
Current DiSEqC technology could allow building monoblock LNB for parallel 16 or cascading 64 satellites positions. However, the main limiting factors are market demands and the popularization of narrow directional beams among TV stations broadcasters, who generally object to inclusive broad audiences despite the clear advantage of lowering the aggregate carbon footprint of monoblock LNBs.

Another adoption barrier for monoblock LNBs with 16 satellites positions is the need for a special shape of antenna dish, which restricts the market potential.

The greatest problem is designing a thin 2°,1° or 0.5° monoblockLNB. A solution overcoming this obstacle may lead to designs of large matrices of multiple LNBs tightly packed into a single monoblock LNB receiver.

Another limiting factor is low awareness by the general population and satellite reception users of Multi Feed Multi satellite, and the fact that it is so easily possible. That awareness is further crippled by the fact that DiSEqC and Monoblock LNBs are not compatible with a satellite channel router (SCR) or unicable LNBs in a single cable distribution.

When using a satellite single cable distribution system for pay-TV subscriptions, end-users need to choose between multiple incompatible receivers compliant with either a single unicable LNB or a multi-Feed, multi-satellite reception by twin or quad Monoblock LNB, unless they intend to use two or four separate cables connected to alternative independent receivers for a multi-room experience.

The technical specifications and confusing advertisements tend to overwhelm the general consumer. Many countries offer Free To Air satellite and terrestrial broadcast services, which are downplayed to promote commercial pay-TV and pay-per-view systems.

== See also ==
- Duo LNB
- USALS = Universal Satellites Automatic Location System
- DiSEqC = Digital Satellite Equipment Control
- SAT>IP end-user consumer equipment that can switch different ip streams from different SAT>IP servers and facilitates selection of reception from different satellites
- Motor-driven Satellite dish
- Automatic Tracking Satellite Dish
- Astra 1: 19.2°E
- Astra 3: 23.5°E
- Astra 2: 28.2°E
- Hotbird 13°E
- Eutelsat
- Eurobird
