= Sat-IP =

Satellite TV reception via a local area network

The SAT>IP logo

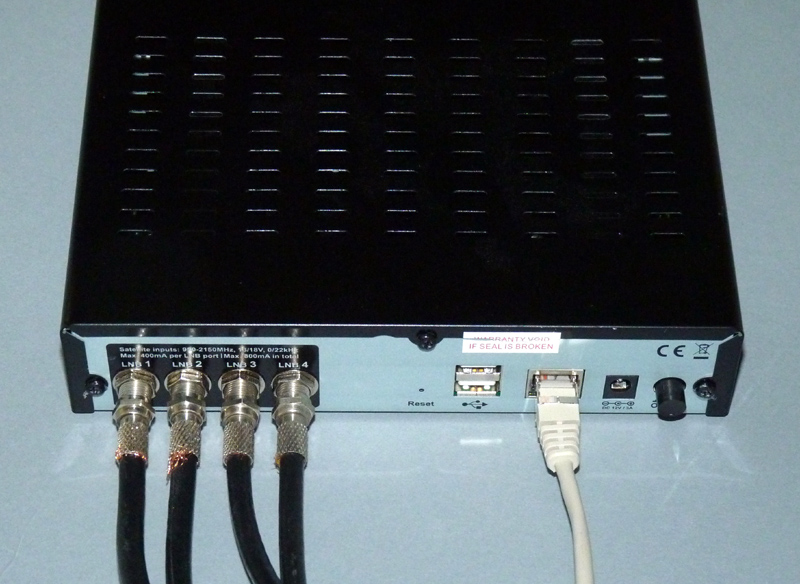
Example of a SAT>IP server: Telestar R1 A connecting to four satellite LNB feeds and an Ethernet connection to distribute satellite TV programs around the network.

SAT>IP reception over a Wi-Fi home network from a Telestar R1 server and fixed dish on a Nexus 7 Android tablet using Elgato SAT>IP app.

SAT>IP (or Sat-IP) specifies an IP-based client–server communication protocol for a TV gateway in which SAT>IP servers, connected to one or more DVB broadcast sources, send the program selected and requested by a SAT>IP client over an IP-based local area network in either unicast for the one requesting client or multicast in one datastream for several SAT>IP clients.

While the system, originating from the DBS satellite operator SES, is originally geared towards receiving and distributing satellite broadcasts in DVB-S or DVB-S2 encoding, SAT>IP also specifies formats for the SAT>IP client request to specify programs broadcast via DVB-C and DVB-T.

Only the SAT>IP servers need tuning hardware and software specific to the DVB-broadcast system(s) being used; SAT>IP clients can be any IP-enabled client multimedia device – Tablets, PCs, laptops, Smartphones, “connected” TVs, video game consoles, media players or others.

The main difference of SAT>IP to other IP-based multi-media distribution systems such as IP-TV and DLNA is that the SAT>IP client does not select a program from a server specific list, but has to specify the DVB reception parameters such as the signal source (typically the satellite number in a DiSEqC switch), frequency, polarisation, Modulation system and type, the wanted PIDs and others. The SAT>IP client would rely for this on an Extended M3U Channel list.

The SAT>IP protocol is standardized as CENELEC EN50585.

== History ==
SES unveiled and demonstrated SAT>IP at the fifth annual SES Industry Days conference 2012, showing the distribution of satellite programmes over CAT5 Ethernet, Power Line, plastic optical fibre and WiFi networks. The first devices implementing the SAT>IP protocol became available in 2012.

In February 2021 the alliance announced it was putting activities on hold. As of July 2024 the official SAT>IP website has gone offline along with its services providing metadata to SAT>IP clients.

== Overview ==
SAT>IP is particularly aimed at satellite TV distribution in the home but can be applied to large multi-dwelling and hospitality reception systems too.

Conventional satellite TV reception systems convert the received transmissions to an intermediate frequency (IF) for distribution via dedicated coaxial cables to one or more satellite tuners and demodulators in set-top boxes. SAT>IP allows the satellite TV distribution to share a data network and enables display and viewing of the signals on any multimedia IP device equipped with suitable software. Multiple SAT>IP servers and clients can operate on the same network with both free-to-air and encrypted pay-TV transmissions.

The intention of the SAT>IP Project is to make SAT>IP an international standard that can be widely implemented worldwide and compatible across manufacturers and operators.

The SAT>IP protocol was developed jointly by the SAT>IP Project partners, satellite operator SES, UK broadcaster BSkyB, and Danish TV software company Craftwork. Prototype SAT>IP equipment and the first certified SAT>IP converter was developed by Inverto Digital Labs, a Luxembourg-based Set Top Box and software designer. SAT>IP is a license free technology available to all manufacturers.

== SAT>IP Alliance ==
In April 2015, at the Las Vegas NAB Show, six satellite operators and equipment manufacturers announced the formation of the SAT>IP Alliance, a coalition to develop compatible hardware and software for SAT>IP technology. At this time, the SAT>IP Alliance founding members were SES, Hispasat, Panasonic, Nagra, ALi Corporation, and MaxLinear.

In September 2015, Eutelsat joined the SAT>IP Alliance as a founder member and the third satellite operator. In May 2017 Irdeto and Verimatrix joined. As of April 2019, the SAT>IP Alliance members are:

- satellite operators:
  - Eutelsat
  - Hispasat
  - SES
- Conditional access system vendors:
  - Irdeto
  - Nagra
  - Verimatrix
- other:
  - Arcadyan
  - MaxLinear
  - Panasonic
  - Zinwell

The SAT>IP Alliance's declared aim is to an open, non-profit industry alliance to promote and further develop SAT>IP.

In September 2017, the DVB consortium of broadcasters, manufacturers, network operators, software developers, and regulators announced an agreement with the SAT>IP Alliance on the future development of the SAT>IP specification and that future promotion of the technology will be conducted jointly, allowing the overall DVB community to contribute to SAT>IP features and services.

In February 2021 the SAT>IP Alliance announced that as the SAT>IP technology is well established and technical development now forms part of the DVB Home Broadcasting Standard, it has "put its activities on hold", although the SAT>IP Alliance website would remain open as an information resource for manufacturers and operators.

== SAT>IP server ==
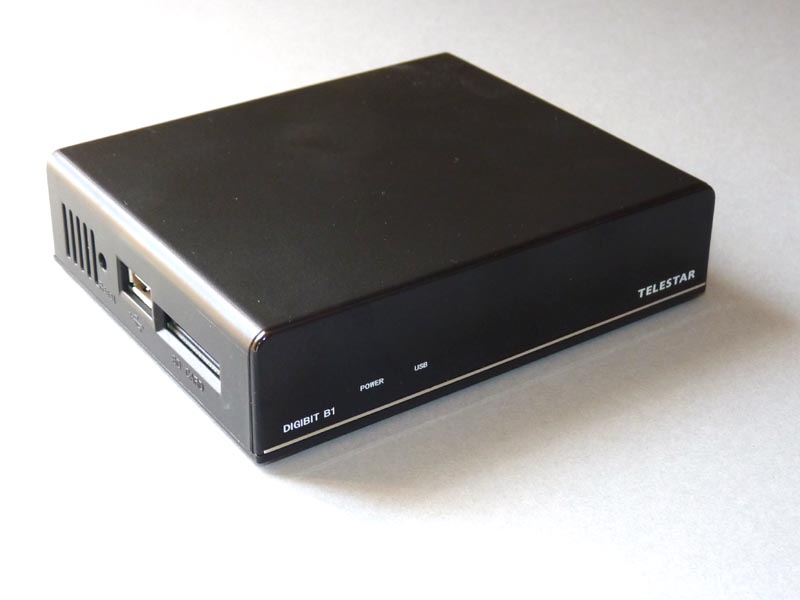
The Telestar B1 client receiver displays SAT>IP channels from a SAT>IP server as well as acting as a media player for data from the USB and SD sockets in the side of the unit.

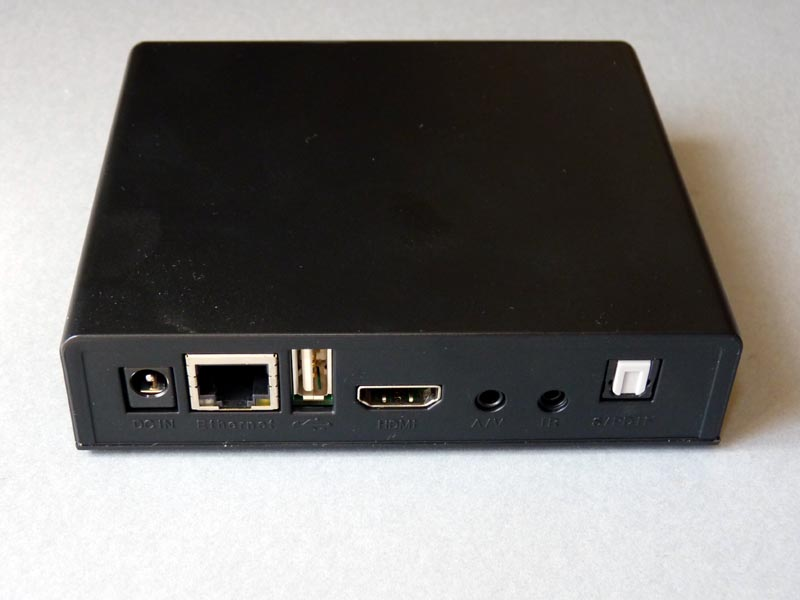
The rear panel of the Telestar B1 client receiver showing the HDMI, S/PDIF, and AV jack outputs, USB for PVR recording and the Ethernet connection to the IP network.

The SAT>IP server removes the RF tuner and demodulator from the client device, providing their functions as a common resource of the IP network. The server will typically contain two or more tuners to serve several clients with different channels simultaneously. It converts the satellite TV signals to IP in their broadcast quality, transparently without any transcoding, effectively removing the DVB-S/S2 layer and replacing it with an IP transport layer.

This process can happen in a master STB (even as an addition to conventional receiver operation), in a distribution device analogous to an IF multiswitch positioned close to the antenna, or even at the antenna itself in the LNB (an IP-LNB).

== SAT>IP protocol ==
Converted to IP, the satellite TV signals can be distributed over any IP network, depending on the configuration of the server, using wired Ethernet, wireless (WLAN, 4G), “Power Line” home networks, optical fibre, plastic fibre, coax, twisted pair (xDSL) or visible light technologies. The SAT>IP protocol is independent of manufacturers and was developed to enable SAT>IP client devices to communicate with SAT>IP servers.

SAT>IP protocol is a remote tuner protocol based on existing protocols such as IP, UPnP, RTSP, HTTP, which have been complemented with extensions for satellite TV where necessary.

The SAT>IP protocol is split into a media plane and a control plane. In the media plane, the SAT>IP server produces media streams in industry standard unicast or multicast RTP/UDP.

In the control plane, clients request access to satellites, transponders and MPEG streams using RTSP or HTTP. Only those transport stream packages needed for the TV transmission requested are carried over the IP network.

The full protocol description (v1.2.2) is publicly available at SAT>IP Protocol.

== Encrypted pay-TV transmission ==
The SAT>IP protocol doesn't provide any specific support for encrypted services. The specification only targets the tuner, and how to access to DVB streams over the network. So if the client wants access to encrypted feeds, it needs to have the correct support for them. This is easy when the client is a device with CAS/CAM hardware support (like a television or set-top-box), but it's unclear how to do it in a PC, mobile or tablet.

== Products ==
Two categories of SAT>IP products exist: SAT>IP clients and servers.

=== SAT>IP clients ===
Software applications to use computers and display devices as SAT>IP clients have been produced by a number of companies.

- DVBViewer.com:

DVBViewer Pro is a digital TV viewer and recorder software application for Windows PCs which has been extended to use SAT>IP. The SAT>IP Viewer Android app is available and DVBViewer also produces an Android app for SAT>IP dish alignment, combining a dish angle calculator and signal strength/quality meter.

- Elgato:

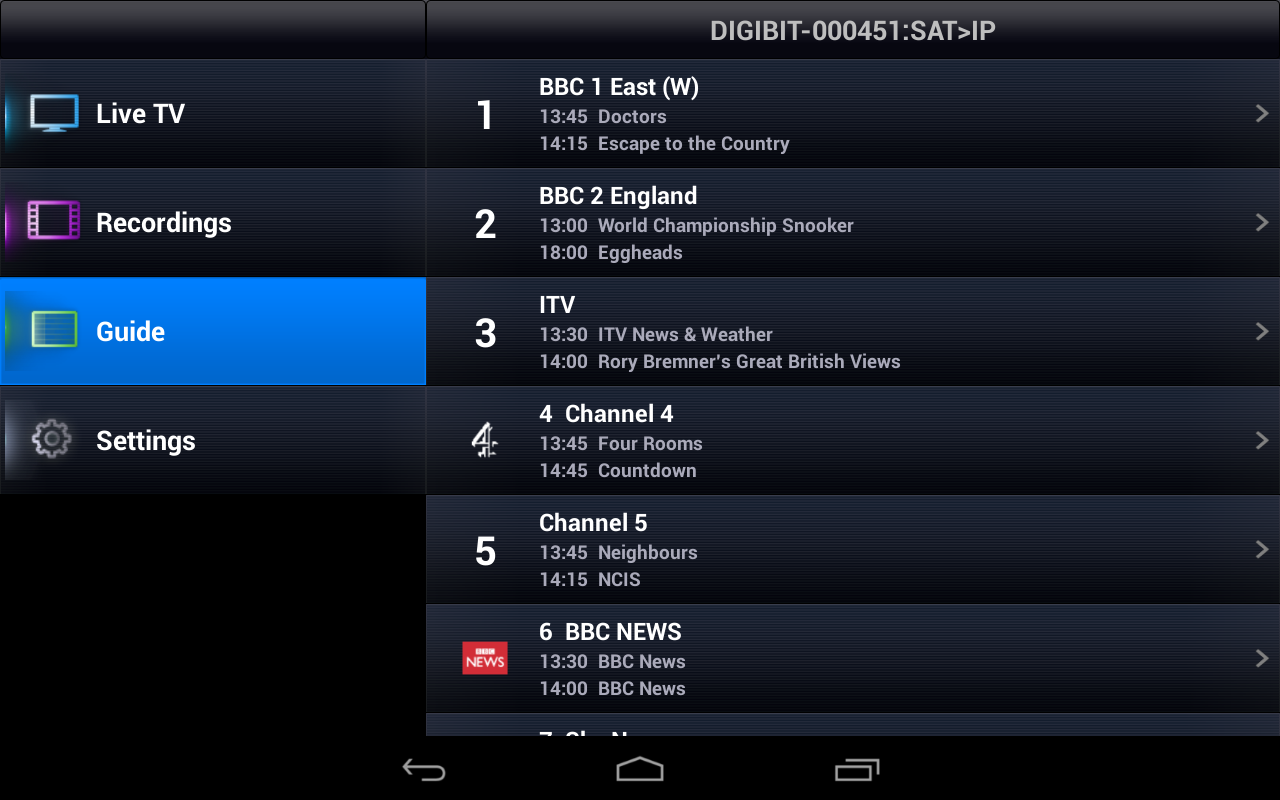
The Android Elgato SAT>IP app running on a Nexus 7 receiving channels and EPG data from a Telesar R1 SAT>IP server.

Elgato Systems produces an app for Android tablets and phones, and an iOS app for iPad and iPhone as a SAT>IP client.

- Tara Systems

The Inaris SAT>IP viewer is available as an app for both Android and iOS devices.

- tivizen:

The tvizen SAT>IP app is available free of charge for Android devices.

- FFmpeg and GPAC:

Both open-source projects are able to process SAT>IP streams.

=== SAT>IP servers ===
- Inverto:

The first certified SAT>IP equipment to be produced for commercial sale was the IDL400S Multibox server from Inverto. The Linux-based Multibox can tune to four satellite signals and stream selected TV/Radio programs to four users' tablets, smart phones, smart TVs, game consoles or connected video devices over a wired and/or wireless home network.

Clients supported by IDL400S Multibox include iOS and Android Tablets and Smart phones, UPnP/DLNA compliant connected media players and video streamers (e.g. Xtreamer, Boxee), UPnP/DLNA compliant Smart TVs (e.g. Sony, Samsung, Loewe, Philips, LG), PC client (Windows Media Player, VLC player, TVersity, XBMC or Boxee), Connected game consoles, Proprietary Inverto clients (Volksbox Essential, Volksbox 2, Volksbox Movie) and other SAT>IP compliant Clients.

- Zinwell:

The Zinwell ZIM-1800 SAT>IP switch/server is the second to be certified to the new standard. The ZIM-1800 offers an opportunity for portable and IP device users to watch rich satellite programmes on their favourite devices, such as iPads, iPhones, Android tablets, smartphones, laptops, smart TVs or any networking devices. The installation and distribution cost can also be significantly reduced by using the Multicast and Unicast features in SMATV systems in hotels and flats.

- Triax:

TSS400 server

- GSS:

DSI400 server

- Schwaiger:

MS41IP server and DSR41IP client receiver

- Telestar:

Digibit R1 server and Digibit B1 client receiver

- Blankom:

SIA-108 professional headend streamer

- Digital Devices:

Servers producing SAT>IP compatible output over a connected network from cable (DVB-C) and digital terrestrial (DVB-T) tuners have been developed by Digital Devices.

- Minisatip

Minisatip is an open source software implementing a SAT>IP server application that runs under Linux. It was tested with DVB-S, DVB-S2, DVB-T, DVB-T2, DVB-C, DVB-C2, ATSC DVB cards.

- SatPI:

SatPI is an open source project that implements a SAT>IP server application that runs under Linux. It currently supports DVB-S/S2/T/C cards.

==== IP-LNB active head for satellite dish ====
In April 2013, SES announced the development by Inverto, Abilis and MaxLinear Inc of a prototype SAT>IP LNB (IP-LNB), which was demonstrated at a conference held at SES' headquarters in Luxembourg. The IP-LNB incorporates eight-channel satellite-to-IP bridging technology to deliver eight concurrent channels via IP unicast or multicast to fixed and portable client devices. By combining satellite reception and IP bridging at the dish, the IP-LNB enables satellite content distribution to the home over a single Ethernet cable, which carries both the IP TV and power for the LNB through Power over Ethernet (PoE) technology, reducing the overall system cost and power consumption. As of July 2012, the prototype IP-LNB was being developed into a commercial product.

In September 2013 at the International Broadcasting Convention in Amsterdam, SES demonstrated a prototype IP-LNB, that is a SAT>IP server integrated into an LNB that can deliver eight concurrent HD channels via IP unicast or multicast from its Ethernet output. In June 2015, Triax launched its IP-LNB, providing eight channels in SAT>IP protocol on a single Ethernet cable, powered over that same cable through Power over Ethernet (PoE) technology.

In May 2015, Korean company I DO IT produced the first flat plate antenna with a built-in SAT>IP server. The Selfsat>IP antenna is 566 mm × 300 mm in size and includes two conventional LNB outputs and an Ethernet output to stream eight different satellite channels around a home network.

== Industry support ==
The SAT>IP website recognises the following companies as supporters of the SAT>IP standard:

- Arcadyan
- Astro
- Broadcom
- Devolo
- Digital Devices
- DVBViewer
- Eutelsat
- Fuba
- Futuraque
- Geniatech
- GMI
- Grundig SAT Systems
- Hispasat
- Humax
- HyperPanel Lab
- Inverto
- Irdeto
- iWedia
- Johansson
- Kathrein
- Labwise
- MaxLinear
- MegaSat
- Microsemi
- Nacamar
- Nagra Kudelski
- Panasonic
- Red Bee Media
- Schwaiger
- Selfsat
- Sensory-Minds
- SES
- SmarDTV
- ST Microelectronics
- TechniSat
- Telestar
- Televes
- Tivizen
- Triax Group
- Unitron Group
- Verimatrix
- Vestel
- Wistron Netweb Group

== See also ==
- USALS = Universal Satellites Automatic Location System
- DiSEqC = Digital Satellite Equipment Control
- Monoblock LNB
- IPTV
- Low-noise block downconverter
- Single Cable Distribution
- Fibre satellite distribution
- SES
