= Duo LNB =

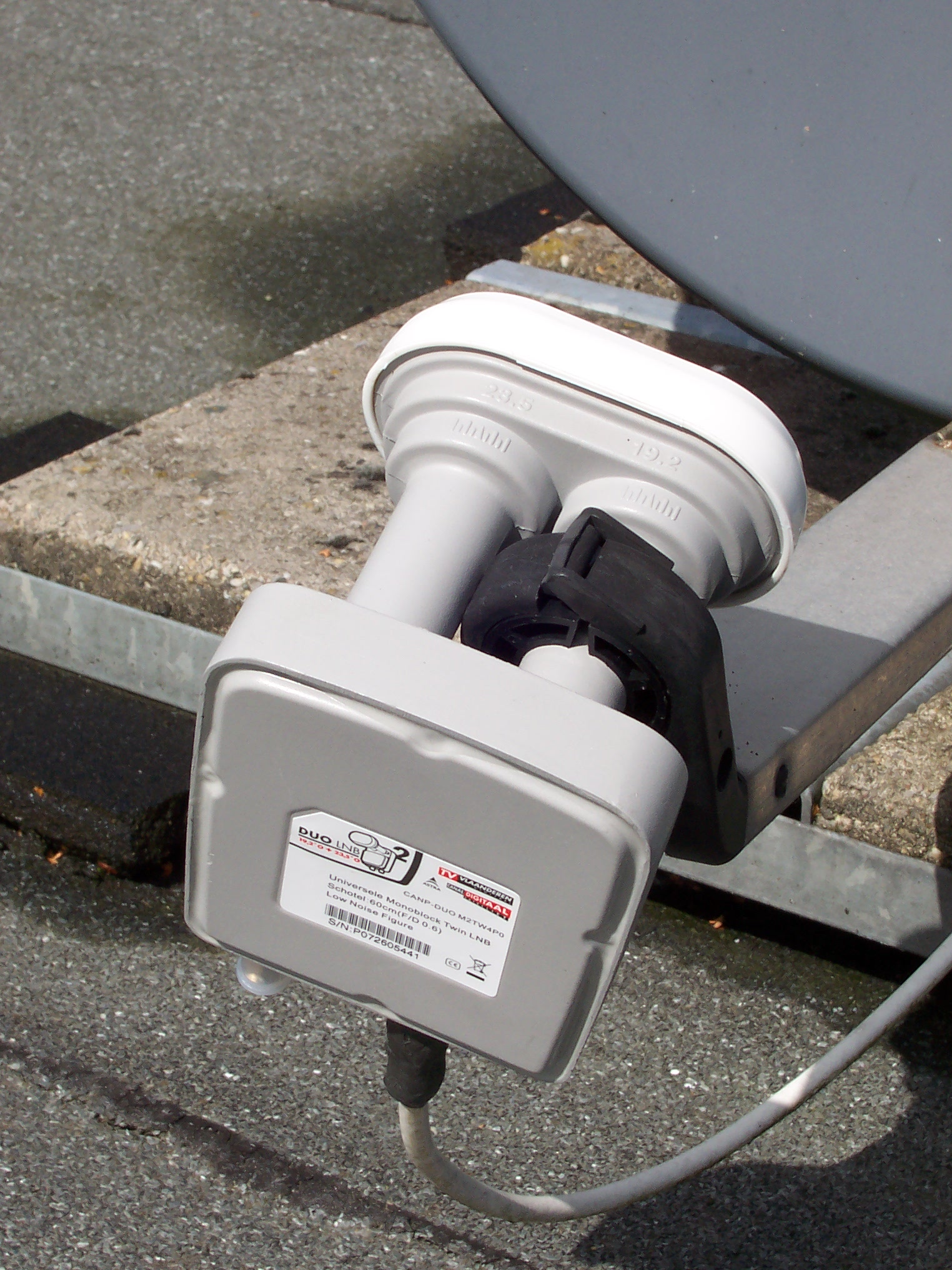
A twin-output Duo LNB fitted to a 60 cm dish with only one output connected. (Note that this LNB is mounted using the 19.2°E feedhorn, not in accordance with SES' installation guidelines)

A Duo LNB is a double low-noise block downconverter (LNB) developed by SES for the simultaneous reception of satellite television signals from both the Astra 23.5°E and Astra 19.2°E satellite positions.

It is a monoblock LNB, which comprises two feedhorns with a single body of electronics containing the LNB stages along with switching circuitry to select which received signal is passed to the output(s). The Duo LNB uses linear polarisation.

== Availability ==
A Duo LNB can be purchased in most parts of Europe but it is particularly marketed to Germany, the Netherlands, Belgium, Czechia and Slovakia.

Duo LNBs operate as universal LNBs and are manufactured under various brand names, such as Maximum and Inverto, in single, twin-output and quad-output versions – with one, two and four outputs (independently selectable for polarisation and frequency band), respectively, for one, two or four receivers/tuners.

The Duo LNB is available in two versions - the original Duo LNB for dishes of 80 cm or 85 cm diameter and the Duo LNB II for dishes of 60 cm.

== Background ==
The Astra 23.5°E orbital position was established as a major source of direct-to-home (DTH) broadcasts for central and western Europe with the launch of Astra 3A at the end of 2007, and some channels moved there from other satellite positions (in particular 19.2° east) so viewers, who were unable to erect two dishes to receive transmissions from both positions, had to choose between them.

In particular, the Czech CS Link and Slovak SkyLink networks moved to Astra 23.5°E, and the Dutch Canal Digitaal launched a new thematic bouquet at 23.5° east in October 2007. The Dutch regional broadcasters all moved to Astra 23.5°E in September 2007, to be lost to viewers without access to the new satellite position.

The Duo LNB was introduced to enable a single satellite dish to be used to receive all the channels from 19.2° east and 23.5° east.

The ASTRA2Connect satellite internet service also operates from 23.5° east.

In May 2010 the Astra 3B satellite was launched to the Astra 23.5° east position to release the Astra 1E and Astra 1G satellites previously in that position for use at other orbital positions. The launch had been much postponed due to technical problems with the Ariane 5 launch rocket. In February 2011, Bulgarian DTH operator Satellite BG launched a package of more than 60 standard definition channels and 12 high definition channels using three transponders on Astra 3B, further increasing the appeal for viewers to receive both satellite positions.

== Technology ==
The basic technology behind the Duo LNB is not new. It takes advantage of the fact that signals hitting a dish off-axis will be focused (albeit with some diffusion) off axis in the opposite direction. So, with the dish aligned so that the central LNB is receiving one satellite, a secondary offset LNB can be aligned on the focus of a second satellite spaced away from the first.

This effect has been exploited for many years to receive signals from two satellites at once with a single dish, and two LNBs have been most commonly arranged on a dish in this way for reception of Astra 19.2°E and the Hot Bird satellites at 13° east, primarily for the abundance of TV channels from 19.2° east, and some additional channels (especially adult channels) from 13° east.

A monoblock LNB provides a convenient alternative to fixing and aligning two LNBs to a dish independently. The two feedhorns are positioned at the correct spacing for reception from the two satellites required and the DiSEqC switching system is used to select between the signals from the two satellites with commands from the connected receiver. In other respects, the monoblock LNB acts as a normal LNB to the connected receiver.

The required separation of the monoblock's feedhorns depends on the angular separation of the satellites to be received, the position of the receive site on the Earth's surface and the focal length of the dish. Fortunately, monoblock LNBs can be standardised for sites across Europe provided that a "standard" offset dish with a focal length/diameter (f/D) ratio of 0.6 is used.

Monoblock LNBs for 19.2° east and 13° east have been widely available for several years (indeed, the DiSEqC switching system was originally designed for just this setup). However, these do not function correctly for Astra 23.5°E and Astra19.2°E because these satellites are at a different angular separation.

In fact, it can be difficult to physically fit two separate LNBs onto a dish at the correct separation for Astra 23.5°E and Astra 19.2°E because their bulk may prevent the feedhorns sitting close enough together.

The Duo LNB is carefully designed with the correct spacing of the feedhorns, DiSEqC level 1.0 switching between the satellites and a low noise amplifier and conversion system.

== Installation ==
The Duo LNB is designed to be fitted with the feedhorn for Astra 23.5°E mounted on the dish's feedarm, and the 19.2°E feedhorn sticking out to the right - as viewed standing in front of the dish, with the satellites behind you. The Astra 23.5°E feedhorn is identified with a "23.5" marking on the casing. The dish is then aligned on the 23.5°E satellite position, using a signal strength meter, in the normal way.

The Duo LNB is rotated in the feed clamp to a certain tilt angle to provide both the correct 'skew' angle for the feedhorns to align with the incoming signals, and the necessary height difference between the feedhorns to accommodate the different elevations of the two satellite positions. The correct skew angle and height difference depend on the position of the receive site on Earth's surface, and in most locations the tilt angle from the LNB is a compromise between their ideal settings. However, within Europe the single tilt angle adjustment provides sufficient accuracy for both settings for reliable reception.

The tilt angle for the Duo LNB at the receive site location may be found in maps or city tables (a scale is marked on the LNB's 23.5°E feedhorn casing) or found by adjustment with a signal meter connected.

By setting the correct tilt angle and aligning the whole dish in azimuth and elevation, the two feedhorns of the LNB are optimally aligned for both orbital positions.

== Name Confusion ==
The Duo LNB is a monoblock type LNB designed for accessing two satellite positions with a single dish and it should not be confused with a "dual LNB", which is the common (US) name for an LNB with a single feedhorn but two separate outputs.

A double LNB called just a "Monoblock" will usually be for reception of 19.2° east and 13° east, and not a Duo LNB suitable for Astra 23.5°E and Astra 19.2°E.

== See also ==
- SES satellite operator
- Astra satellite family
- Astra 23.5°E one satellite position received
- Astra 19.2°E second satellite position received
- Astra 3A satellite
- Astra 3B satellite
- Monoblock LNB
- ASTRA2Connect satellite Internet service at 23.5° east
