= Low-noise block downconverter =

Receiving device on satellite dishes

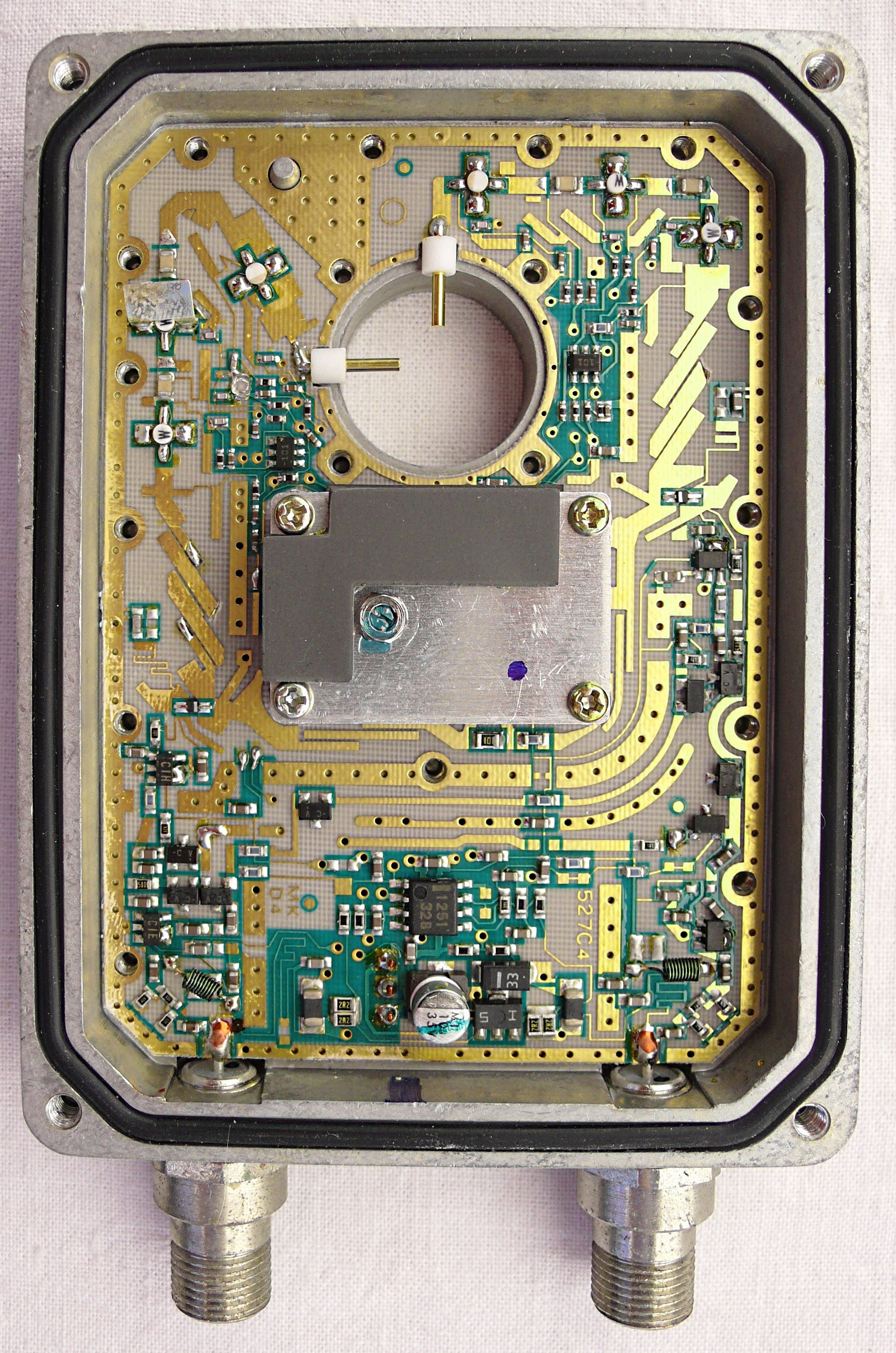
A disassembled LNB. A waveguide carrying the microwave signal from the external dish antenna enters at the hole in the center, where two pins act as internal antennas (for two different polarizations). Here the microwave signal is coupled into microstrips on the LNB's circuit board, in order for the RF signal to be amplified and downconverted into lower frequencies, which are output at the two F connector sockets at the bottom.

A low-noise block downconverter (LNB) is the receiving device mounted on satellite dishes used for satellite TV reception, which collects the radio waves from the dish and converts them to a signal which is sent through a cable to the receiver inside the building. Also called a low-noise block, low-noise converter (LNC), or even low-noise downconverter (LND), the device is sometimes inaccurately called a low-noise amplifier (LNA).

The LNB is a combination of low-noise amplifier, frequency mixer, local oscillator and intermediate frequency (IF) amplifier. It serves as the RF front end of the satellite receiver, receiving the microwave signal from the satellite collected by the dish, amplifying it, and downconverting the block of frequencies to a lower block of intermediate frequencies (IF). This downconversion allows the signal to be carried to the indoor satellite TV receiver using relatively cheap coaxial cable; if the signal remained at its original microwave frequency it would require an expensive and impractical waveguide line.

The LNB is usually a small box suspended on one or more short booms, or feed arms, in front of the dish reflector, at its focus (although some dish designs have the LNB on or behind the reflector). The microwave signal from the dish is picked up by a feedhorn on the LNB and is fed to a section of waveguide. One or more metal pins, or probes, protrude into the waveguide at right angles to the axis and act as antennas, feeding the signal to a printed circuit board inside the LNB's shielded box for processing. The lower frequency IF output signal emerges from a socket on the box to which the coaxial cable connects.

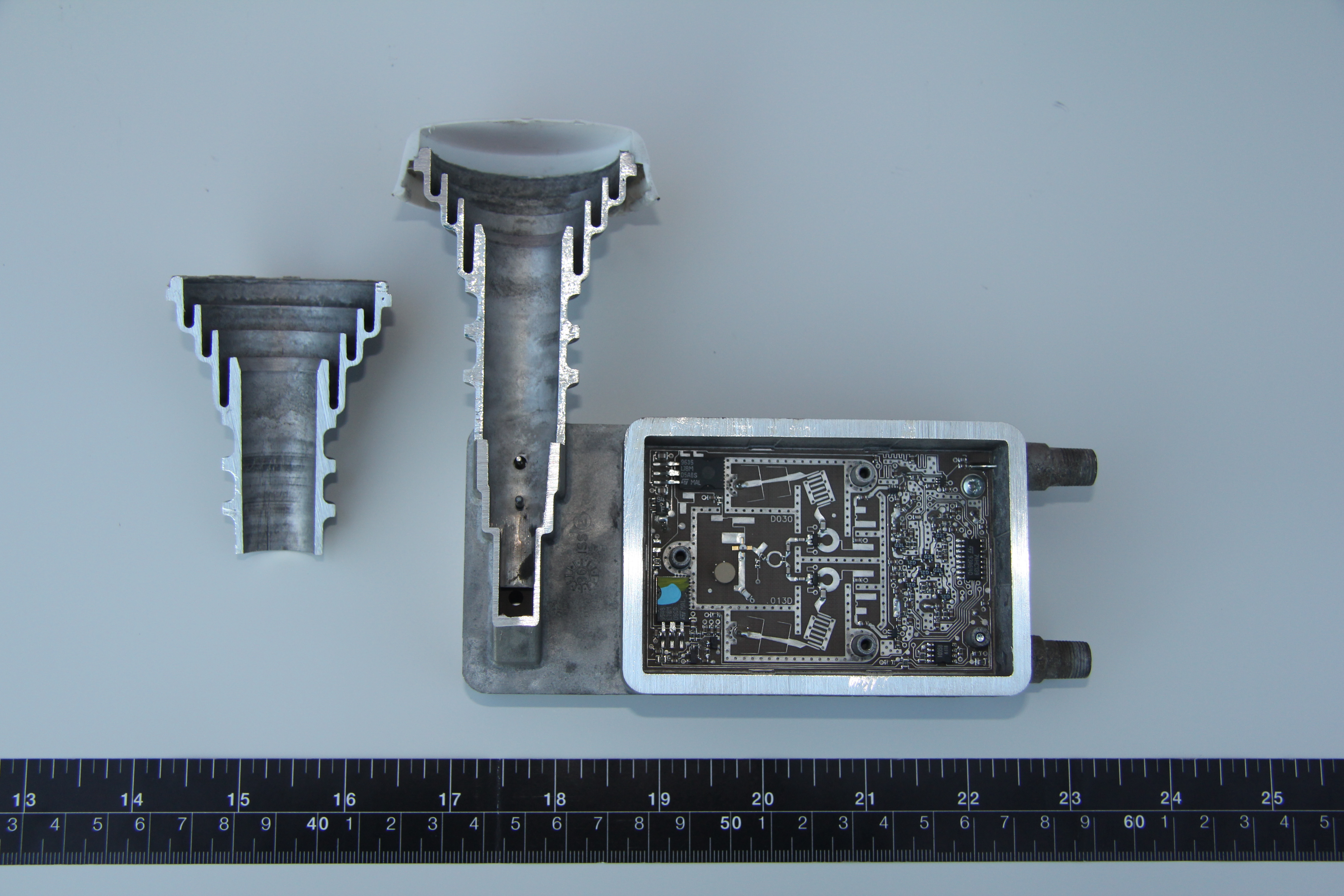
Cross-section across a low-noise block downconverter

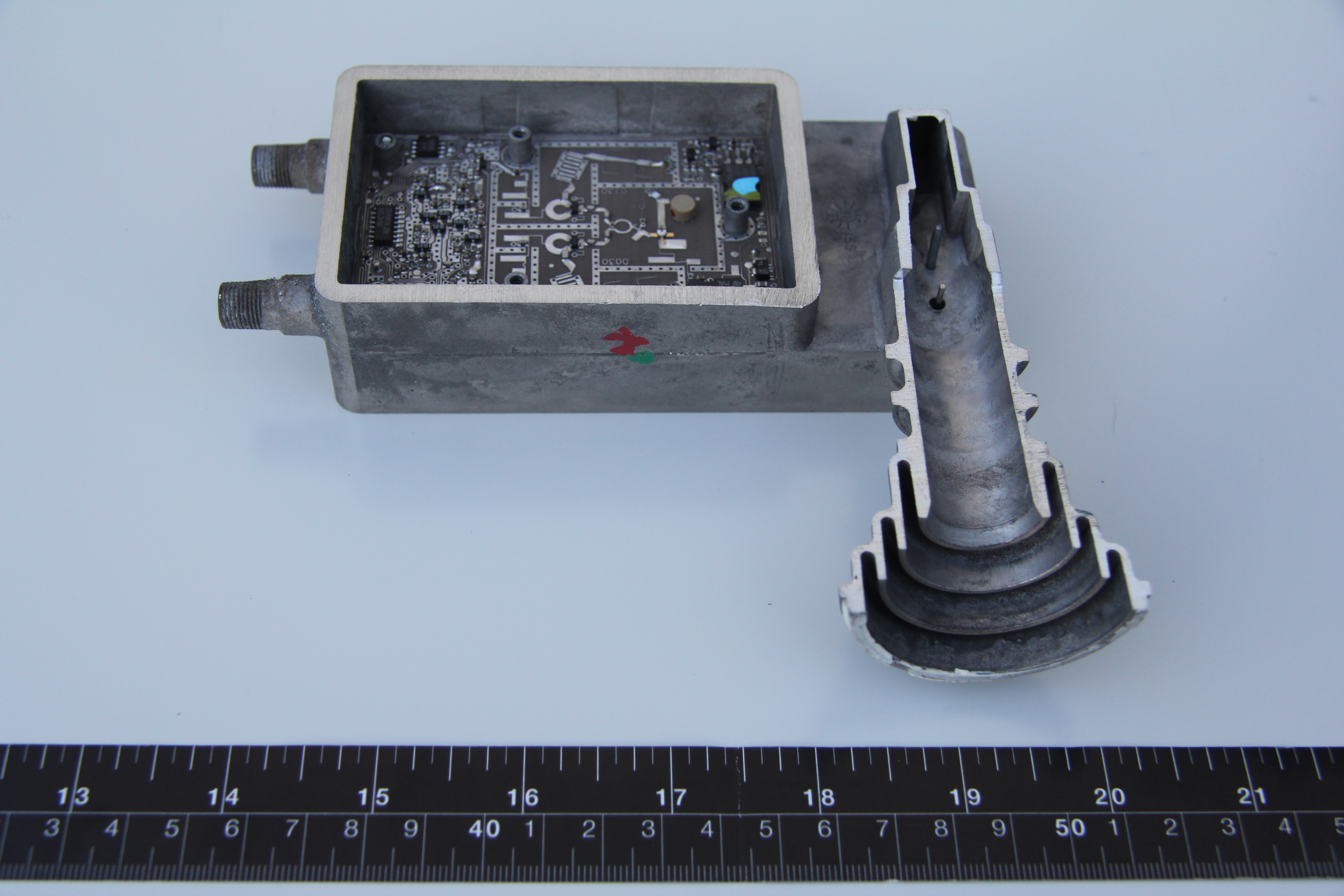
Viewing of the pin and the horn antenna in a low-noise block downconverter

The LNB gets its power from the receiver or set-top box, using the same coaxial cable that carries signals from the LNB to the receiver. This phantom power travels to the LNB; opposite to the signals from the LNB.

A corresponding component, called a block upconverter (BUC), is used at the satellite earth station (uplink) dish to convert the band of television channels to the microwave uplink frequency.

== Amplification and noise ==
The signal received by the LNB is extremely weak and it has to be amplified before downconversion. The low-noise amplifier section of the LNB amplifies this weak signal while adding the minimum possible amount of noise to the signal.

The low-noise quality of an LNB is expressed as the noise figure (or sometimes noise temperature). This is the signal-to-noise ratio at the input divided by the signal-to-noise ratio at the output. It is typically expressed as a decibels (dB) value. The ideal LNB, effectively a perfect amplifier, would have a noise figure of 0 dB and would not add any noise to the signal. Every LNB introduces some noise but clever design techniques, expensive high-performance low-noise components such as HEMTs and even individual tweaking of the LNB after manufacture, can reduce some of the noise contributed by the LNB's components. Active cooling to very low temperatures can help reduce noise too, and is often used in scientific research applications.

Every LNB off the production line has a different noise figure because of manufacturing tolerances. The noise figure quoted in the specifications, important for determining the LNB's suitability, is usually representative of neither that particular LNB nor the performance across the whole frequency range, since the noise figure most often quoted is the typical figure averaged over the production batch.

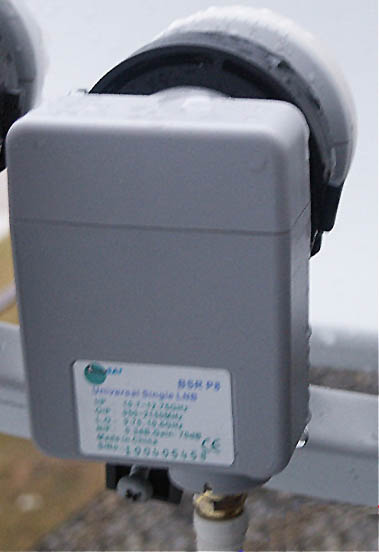
K_{u}-band linear-polarized LNBF

== Block downconversion ==
Satellites use comparatively high radio frequencies (microwaves) to transmit their TV signals. As microwave satellite signals do not easily pass through walls, roofs, or even glass windows, it is preferable for satellite antennas to be mounted outdoors. However, plastic glazing is transparent to microwaves and residential satellite dishes have successfully been hidden indoors looking through acrylic or polycarbonate windows to preserve the external aesthetics of the home.

The purpose of the LNB is to use heterodyning to take a block (or band) of relatively high frequencies and convert them to similar signals carried at a much lower frequency (called the intermediate frequency or IF). These lower frequencies travel through cables with much less attenuation, so there is much more signal left at the satellite receiver end of the cable. It is also much easier and cheaper to design electronic circuits to operate at these lower frequencies, rather than the very high frequencies of satellite transmission.

The frequency conversion is performed by mixing a fixed frequency produced by a local oscillator inside the LNB with the incoming signal, to generate two signals equal to the sum of their frequencies and the difference. The frequency sum signal is filtered out and the frequency difference signal (the IF) is amplified and sent down the cable to the receiver:

C-band
$$f_\text{IF} = f_\text{LO} - f_\text{recv}$$
K_{u}-band
$$f_\text{IF} = f_\text{recv} - f_\text{LO}$$

where $\scriptstyle f$ is a frequency.

The local oscillator frequency determines what block of incoming frequencies is downconverted to the frequencies expected by the receiver. For example, to downconvert the incoming signals from Astra 1KR, which transmits in a frequency block of 10.70–11.70 GHz, to within a standard European receiver's IF tuning range of 950–2,150 MHz, a 9.75 GHz local oscillator frequency is used, producing a block of signals in the band 950–1,950 MHz.

For the block of higher transmission frequencies used by Astra 2A and 2B (11.70–12.75 GHz), a different local oscillator frequency converts the block of incoming frequencies. Typically, a local oscillator frequency of 10.60 GHz is used to downconvert the block to 1,100–2,150 MHz, which is still within the receiver's 950–2,150 MHz IF tuning range.

In a C-band antenna setup, the transmission frequencies are typically 3.7–4.2 GHz. By using a local oscillator frequency of 5.150 GHz the IF will be 950–1,450 MHz which is, again, in the receiver's IF tuning range.

For the reception of wideband satellite television carriers, typically 27 MHz wide, the accuracy of the frequency of the LNB local oscillator need only be in the order of ±500 kHz, so low cost dielectric oscillators (DRO) may be used. For the reception of narrow bandwidth carriers or ones using advanced modulation techniques, such as 16-QAM, highly stable and low phase noise LNB local oscillators are required. These use an internal crystal oscillator or an external 10 MHz reference from the indoor unit and a phase-locked loop (PLL) oscillator.

== Low-noise block feedhorns (LNBFs) ==
With the launch of the first DTH broadcast satellite in Europe (Astra 1A) by SES in 1988, antenna design was simplified for the anticipated mass market. In particular, the feedhorn (which gathers the signal and directs it to the LNB) and the polarizer (which selects between differently polarized signals) were combined with the LNB itself into a single unit, called an LNB-feed or LNB-feedhorn (LNBF), or even an "Astra type" LNB. The prevalence of these combined units has meant that today the term LNB is commonly used to refer to all antenna units that provide the block-downconversion function, with or without a feedhorn.

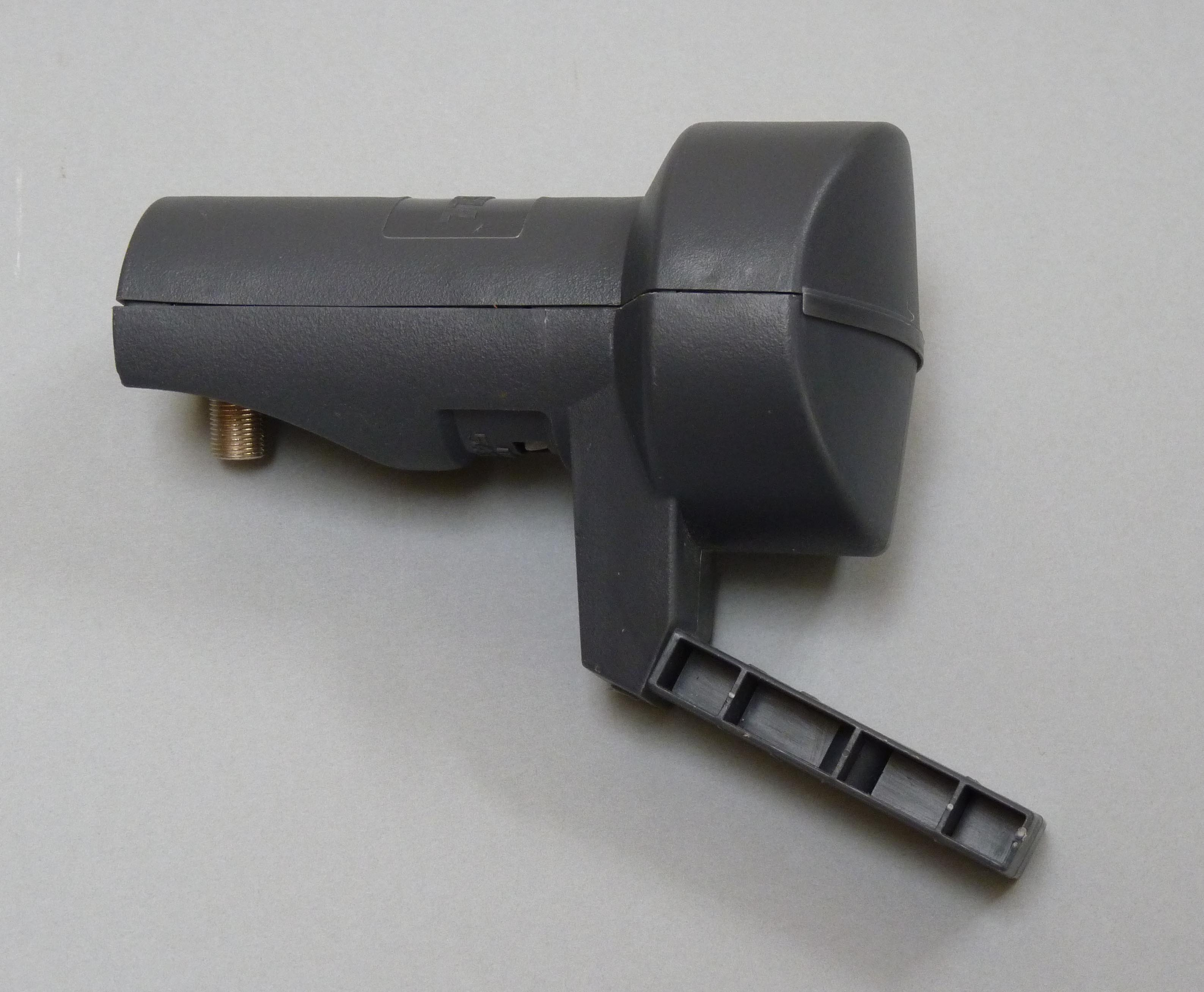
LNBF for Sky Digital and Freesat in the UK

The Astra type LNBF that includes a feedhorn and polarizer is the most common variety, and this is fitted to a dish using a bracket that clamps a collar around the waveguide neck of the LNB between the feedhorn and the electronics package. The diameter of the LNB neck and collar is usually 40mm although other sizes are also produced. In the UK, the "minidish" sold for use with Sky Digital and Freesat uses an LNBF with an integrated clip-in mount.

LNBs without a feedhorn built-in are usually provided with a (C120) flange around the input waveguide mouth which is bolted to a matching flange around the output of the feedhorn or polarizer unit.

== Polarization ==
It is common to polarize satellite TV signals because it provides a way of transmitting more TV channels using a given block of frequencies. This approach requires the use of receiving equipment that can filter incoming signals based on their polarization. Two satellite TV signals can then be transmitted on the same frequency (or, more usually, closely spaced frequencies) and provided that they are polarized differently, the receiving equipment can still separate them and display whichever one is currently required.

Throughout the world, most satellite TV transmissions use vertical and horizontal linear polarization, but in North America, DBS transmissions use left- and right-hand circular polarization. Within the waveguide of a North American DBS LNB a slab of dielectric material is used to convert left and right circular polarized signals to vertical and horizontal linearly polarized signals so the converted signals can be treated the same as in systems that use linear polarization for transmission.

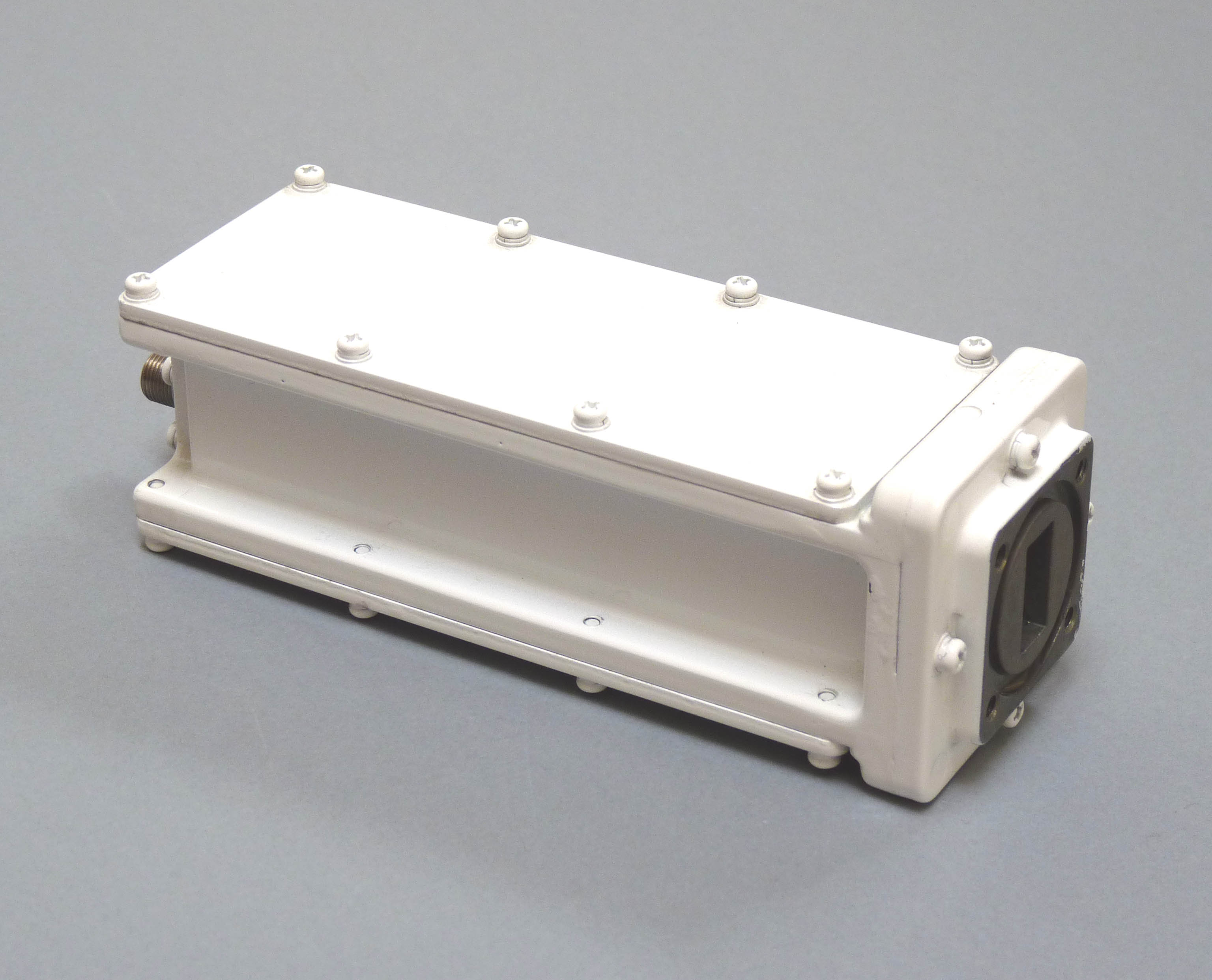
A 1980s K_{u}-band LNB (2.18 dB noise figure) without built-in polarization selection and with a WR75 fitting for separate feedhorn and polarizer

The probe inside the LNB waveguide collects signals that are polarized in the same plane as the probe. To maximise the strength of the wanted signals (and to minimise reception of unwanted signals of the opposite polarization), the probe is aligned with the polarization of the incoming signals. This is most simply achieved by adjusting the LNB's skew; its rotation about the waveguide axis. To remotely select between the two polarizations, and to compensate for inaccuracies of the skew angle, it used to be common to fit a polarizer in front of the LNB's waveguide mouth. This either rotates the incoming signal with an electromagnet around the waveguide (a magnetic polarizer) or rotates an intermediate probe within the waveguide using a servo motor (a mechanical polarizer) but such adjustable skew polarizers are rarely used today.

The simplification of antenna design that accompanied the first Astra DTH broadcast satellites in Europe to produce the LNBF extended to a simpler approach to the selection between vertical and horizontal polarized signals too. Astra type LNBFs incorporate two probes in the waveguide, at right angles to one another so that, once the LNB has been skewed in its mount to match the local polarization angle, one probe collects horizontal signals and the other vertical, and an electronic switch (controlled by the voltage of the LNB's power supply from the receiver: 13 V for vertical and 18 V for horizontal) determines which polarization is passed on through the LNB for amplification and block-downconversion.

Such LNBs can receive all the transmissions from a satellite with no moving parts and with just one cable connected to the receiver, and have since become the most common type of LNB produced.

== Common LNBs ==
=== C-band LNB ===
Here is an example of a North American C-band LNB:

- Local oscillator: 5.15 GHz
- Frequency: 3.40–4.20 GHz
- Noise temperature: 25–100 kelvins (uses kelvin ratings as opposed to dB rating).
- Polarization: Linear

Supply voltage	Block		Local oscillator frequency	Intermediate freq. range
Supply voltage	Polarization	Frequency band	Local oscillator frequency	Intermediate freq. range
13 V	Vertical	3.40–4.20 GHz	5.15 GHz	950–1,750 MHz
18 V	Horizontal	3.40–4.20 GHz	5.15 GHz	950–1,750 MHz

=== K_{u}-band LNB ===
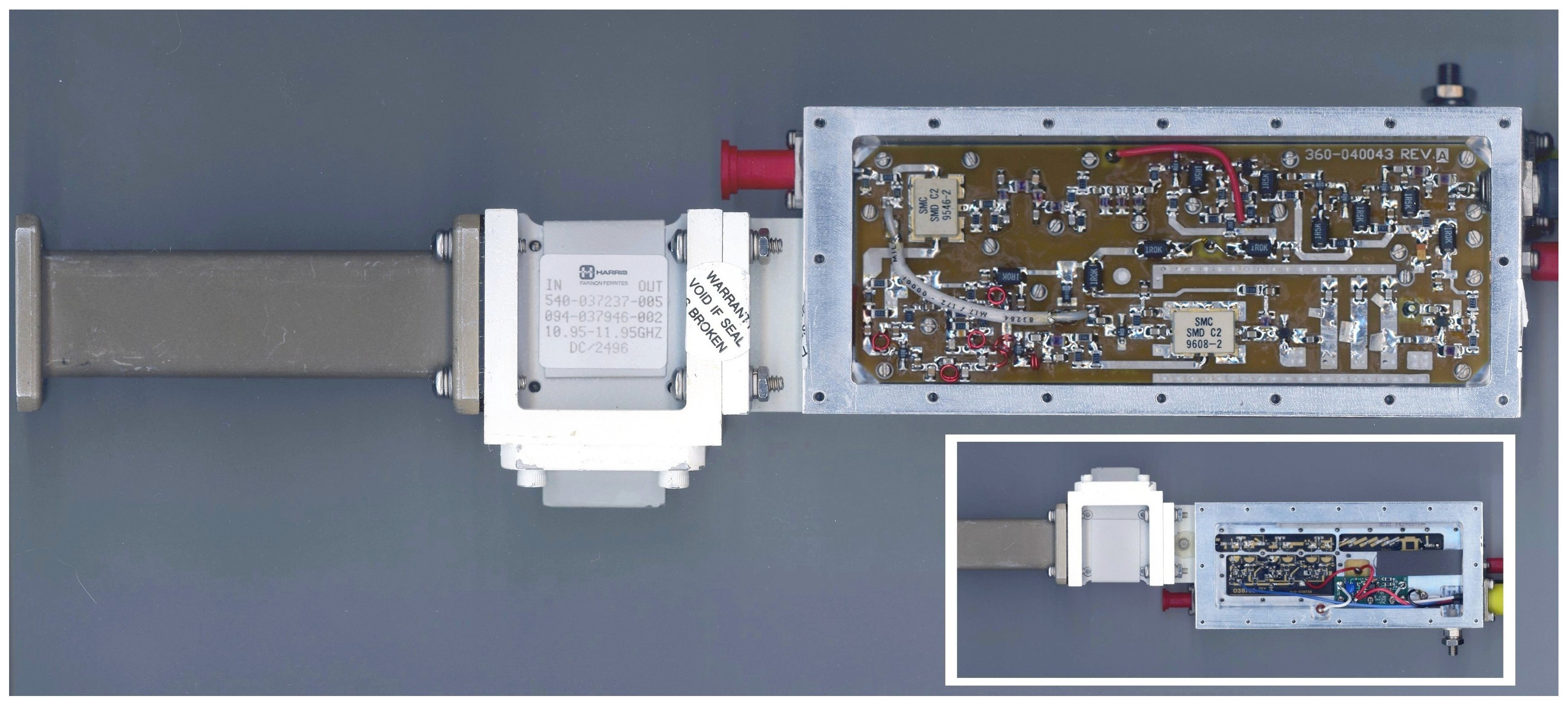
K_{u}-band LNB with both sides uncovered

==== Standard North America K_{u} band LNB ====
Here is an example of a standard linear LNB:

- Local oscillator: 10.75 GHz
- Frequency: 11.70–12.20 GHz
- Noise figure: 1 dB typical
- Polarization: Linear

Supply voltage	Block		Local oscillator frequency	Intermediate freq. range
Supply voltage	Polarization	Frequency band	Local oscillator frequency	Intermediate freq. range
13 V	Vertical	11.70–12.20 GHz	10.75 GHz	950–1,450 MHz
18 V	Horizontal	11.70–12.20 GHz	10.75 GHz	950–1,450 MHz

==== Universal LNB ("Astra" LNB) ====
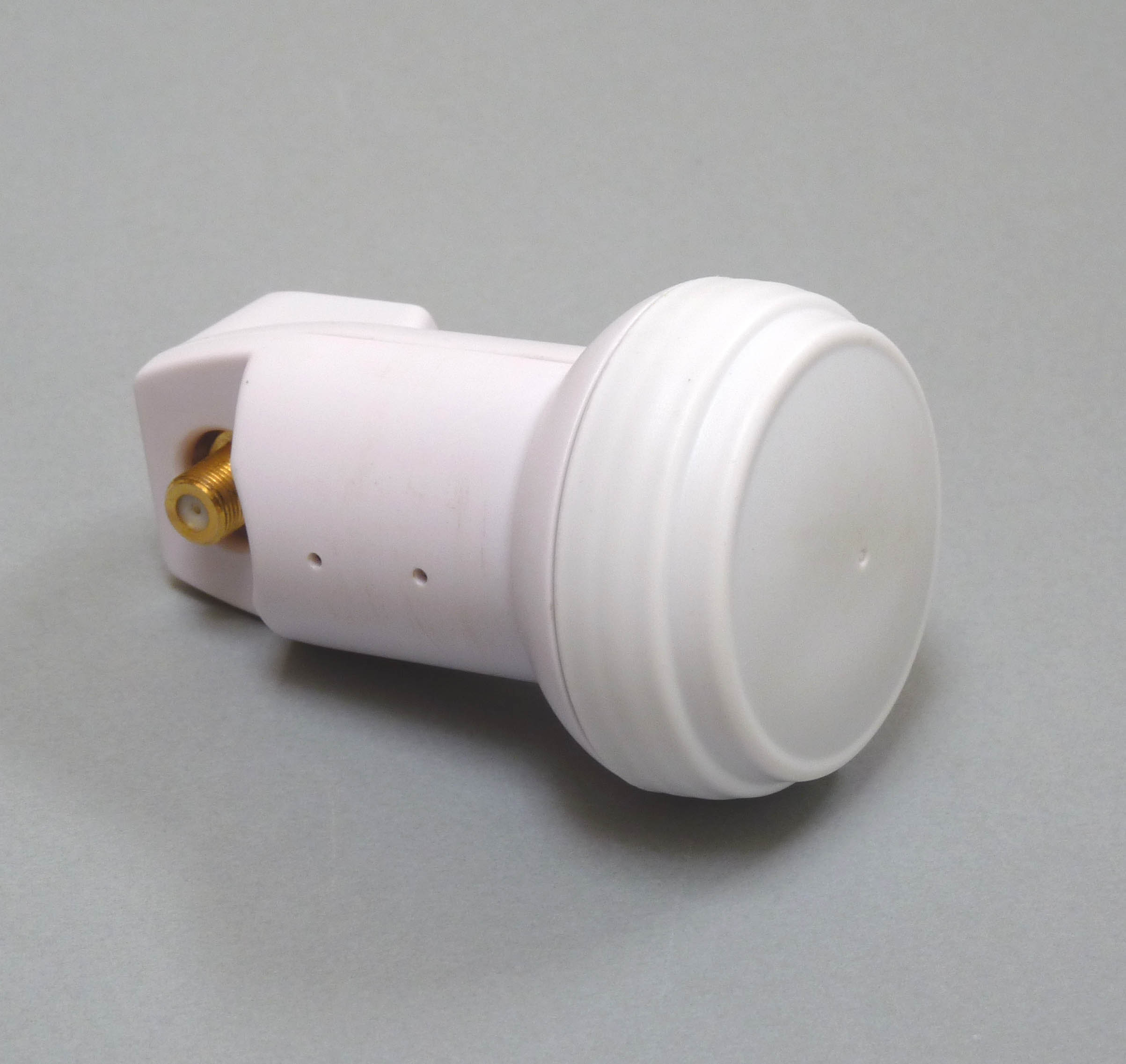
Astra-type LNBF

In Europe, as SES launched more Astra satellites to the 19.2°E orbital position in the 1990s, the range of downlink frequencies used in the FSS band (10.70–11.70 GHz) grew beyond that catered for by the standard LNBs and receivers of the time. Reception of signals from Astra 1D required an extension of receivers' IF tuning range from 950–1,950 MHz to 950–2,150 MHz and a change of LNBs' local oscillator frequency from the usual 10 GHz to 9.75 GHz (so-called enhanced LNBs).

The launch of Astra 1E and subsequent satellites saw the first use by Astra of the BSS band of frequencies (11.70–12.75 GHz) for new digital services and required the introduction of an LNB that would receive the whole frequency range 10.70–12.75 GHz, the universal LNB.

A universal LNB has a switchable local oscillator frequency of 9.75/10.60 GHz to provide two modes of operation: low band reception (10.70–11.70 GHz) and high band reception (11.70–12.75 GHz). The local oscillator frequency is switched in response to a 22 kHz signal superimposed on the supply voltage from the connected receiver. Along with the supply voltage level used to switch between polarizations, this enables a universal LNB to receive both polarizations (vertical and horizontal) and the full range of frequencies in the satellite K_{u} band under the control of the receiver, in four sub-bands:

Here is an example of a universal LNB used in Europe:

- Noise figure: 0.2 dB typical
- Polarization: Linear

Supply		Block		Local oscillator frequency	Intermediate freq. range
Voltage	Tone	Polarization	Frequency band	Local oscillator frequency	Intermediate freq. range
13 V	0 kHz	Vertical	10.70–11.70 GHz, low	9.75 GHz	950–1,950 MHz
18 V	0 kHz	Horizontal	10.70–11.70 GHz, low	9.75 GHz	950–1,950 MHz
13 V	22 kHz	Vertical	11.70–12.75 GHz, high	10.60 GHz	1,100–2,150 MHz
18 V	22 kHz	Horizontal	11.70–12.75 GHz, high	10.60 GHz	1,100–2,150 MHz

==== North America DBS LNB ====
Here is an example of an LNB used for DBS:

- Local oscillator: 11.25 GHz
- Frequency: 12.20–12.70 GHz
- Noise figure: 0.7 dB
- Polarization: Circular

Supply voltage	Block		Local oscillator frequency	Intermediate freq. range
Supply voltage	Polarization	Frequency band	Local oscillator frequency	Intermediate freq. range
13 V	Right-hand	12.20–12.70 GHz	11.25 GHz	950–1,450 MHz
18 V	Left-hand	12.20–12.70 GHz	11.25 GHz	950–1,450 MHz

=== K_{a} band LNB ===
Here are examples of K_{a} band LNBs:

Supply voltage	Block		Local oscillator frequency	Intermediate freq. range
Supply voltage	Polarization	Frequency band	Local oscillator frequency	Intermediate freq. range
13 V	Right-hand	20.2–21.2 GHz	19.25 GHz	950–1,950 MHz
18 V	Left-hand	20.2–21.2 GHz	19.25 GHz	950–1,950 MHz
13 V	Right-hand	21.2–22.2 GHz	20.25 GHz	950–1,950 MHz
18 V	Left-hand	21.2–22.2 GHz	20.25 GHz	950–1,950 MHz

Here is an example of a Norsat K_{a} band LNB:

Supply voltage	Block		Local oscillator frequency	Intermediate freq. range
Supply voltage	Polarization	Frequency band	Local oscillator frequency	Intermediate freq. range
13 V	Right-hand	18.2–19.2 GHz	17.25 GHz	950–1,950 MHz
18 V	Left-hand	18.2–19.2 GHz	17.25 GHz	950–1,950 MHz

=== S band LNB ===
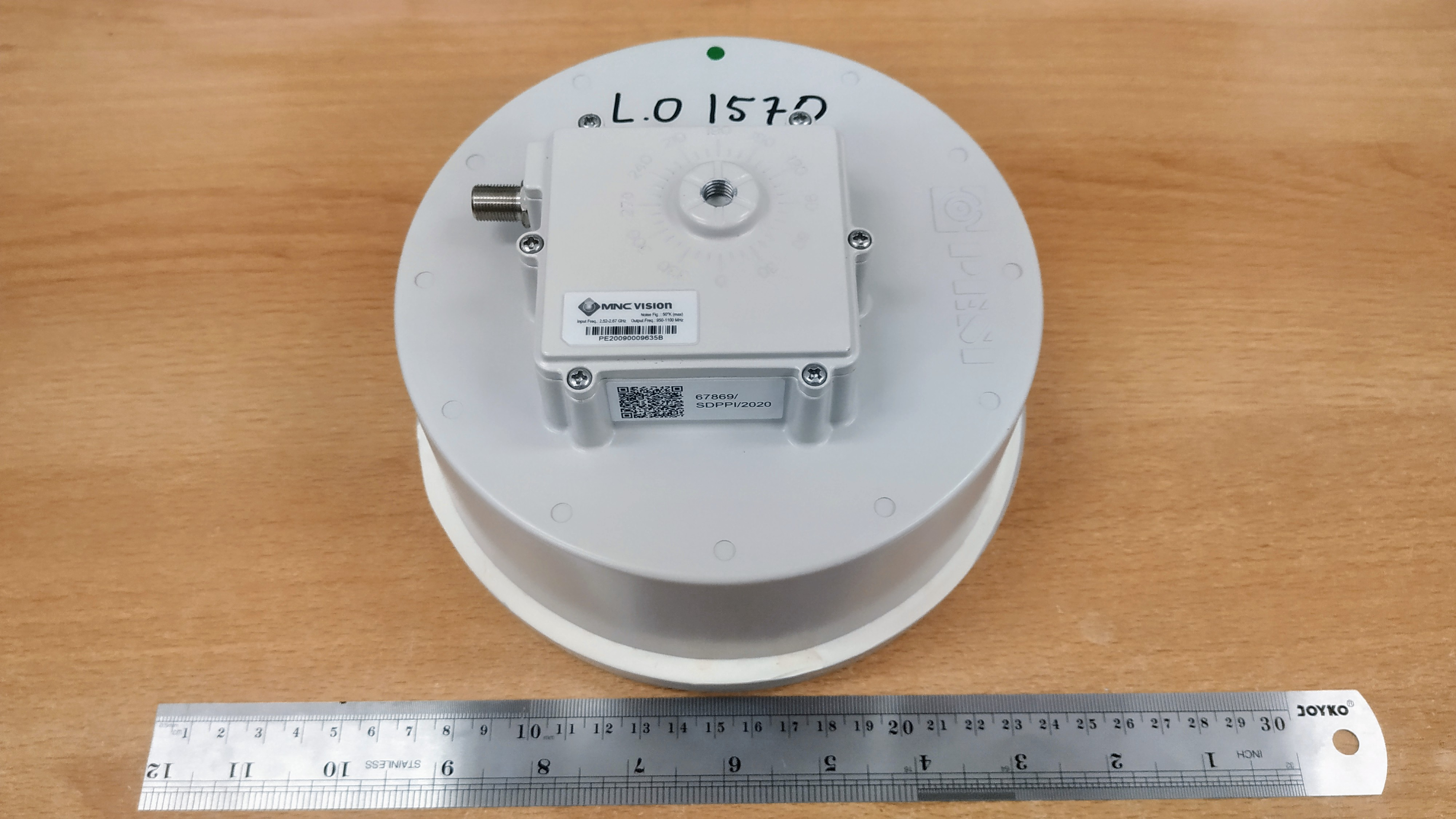
S-band LNB with written local oscillator frequency

Here is an example of an S band LNB:

- Local oscillator: 1.57 GHz
- Frequency: 2.52-2.67 GHz
- Noise temperature: Maximum of 50 kelvins (uses kelvin ratings as opposed to dB rating)
- Polarization: Linear

Supply voltage	Block		Local oscillator frequency	Intermediate freq. range
Supply voltage	Polarization	Frequency band	Local oscillator frequency	Intermediate freq. range
13 V	Vertical	2.52-2.67 GHz	1.57 GHz	950–1,100 MHz
18 V	Horizontal	2.52-2.67 GHz	1.57 GHz	950–1,100 MHz

This frequency range of LNB is quite rare as the only direct broadcast satellites that work with the S-band frequency are IndoStar-1 and IndoStar-2, both utilized by Indonesian direct-to-home provider MNC Vision. S-band was chosen for these satellites because its frequencies efficiently penetrate the atmosphere and provide high-quality transmissions to small-diameter 80 cm antennas in regions that experience heavy rainfall such as Indonesia. A similar Ku- or C-band reception performance requires greater transmission power or much larger dish to penetrate the moist atmosphere.

== Multi-output LNBs ==
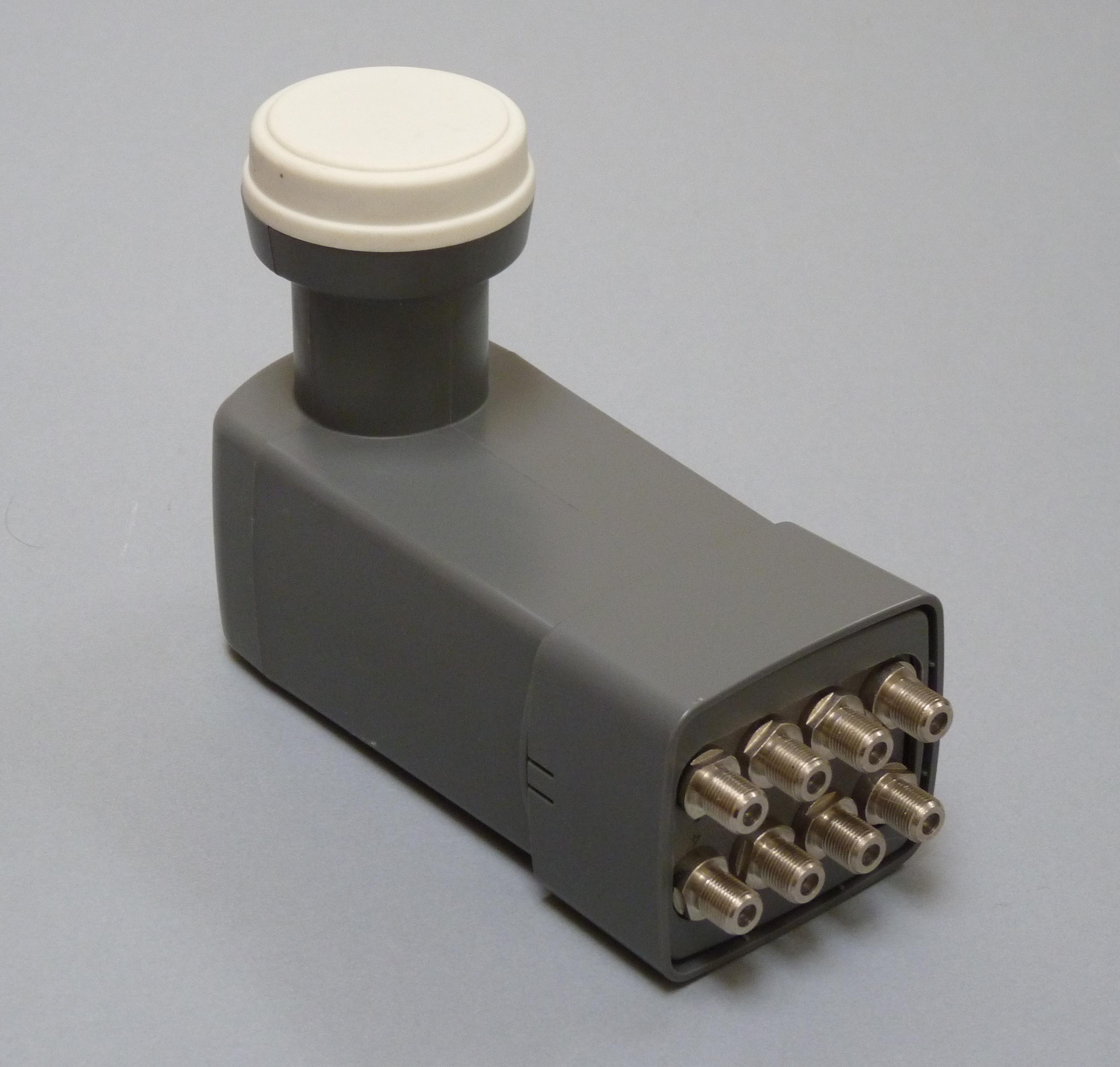
An eight-output, or octo, LNBF

=== Dual, twin, quad, and octo LNBs ===
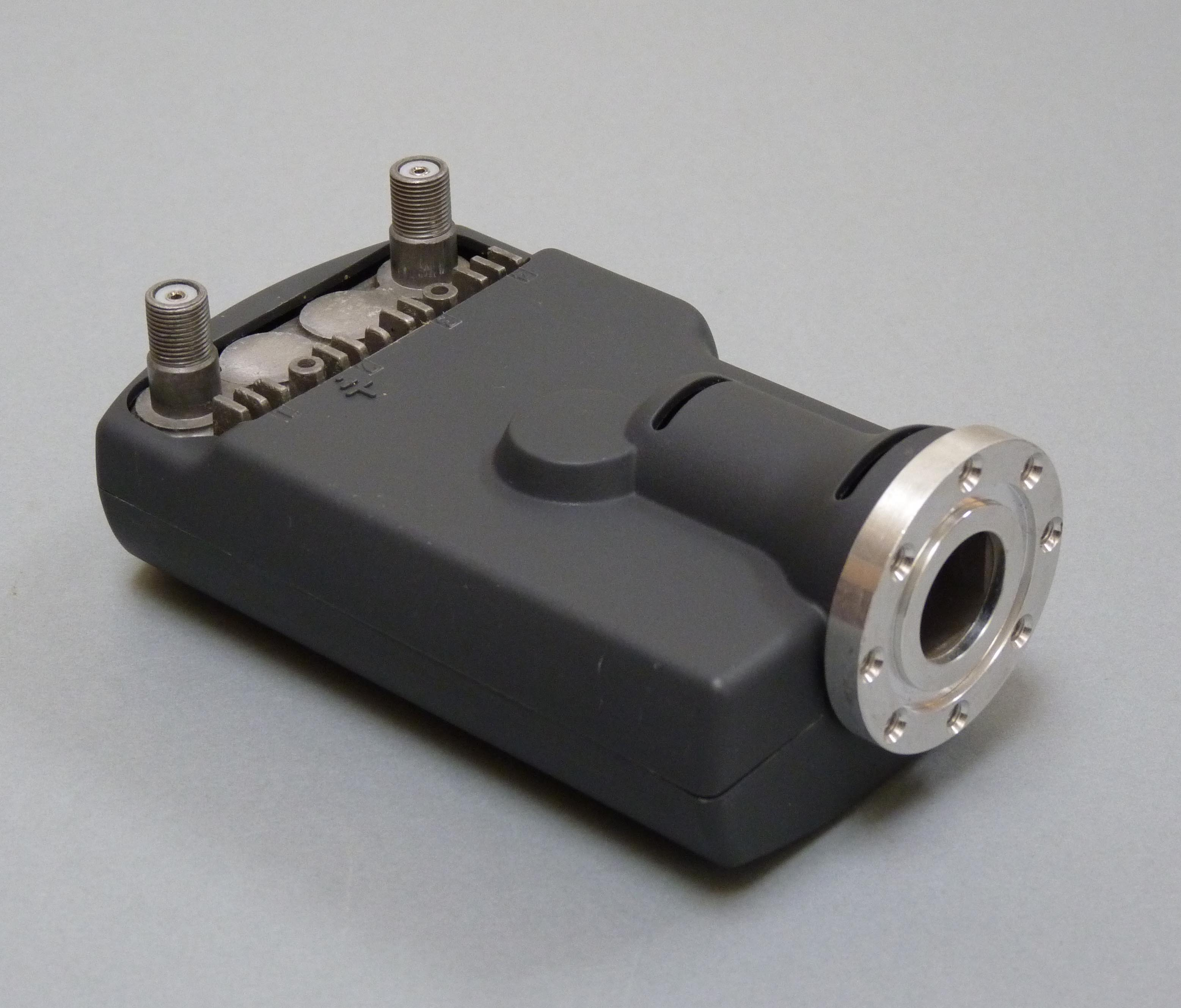
A twin-output universal LNB with a C120 flange fitting for a separate feedhorn

An LNB with a single feedhorn but multiple outputs for connection to multiple tuners (in separate receivers or within the same receiver in the case of a twin-tuner PVR receiver). Typically, two, four or eight outputs are provided. Each output responds to the tuner's band and polarization selection signals independently of the other outputs and appears to the tuner to be a separate LNB. Such an LNB usually may derive its power from a receiver connected to any of the outputs. Unused outputs may be left unconnected (but waterproofed for the protection of the whole LNB).

Note: In the US an LNB with two outputs is termed a dual LNB, but in the UK the term dual LNB historically described an LNB with two outputs, each producing only one polarisation, for connection to a multiswitch (the term and the LNBs fell out of use with the introduction of the universal LNB and the multiswitch equivalent, the quattro LNB – see below). Today dual LNB (and dual feed) describes antennas for reception from two satellite positions, using either two separate LNBs or a single monoblock LNB with two feedhorns. In the UK, the term twin-output LNB, or simply twin LNB, is usually used for an LNB with a single feedhorn but two independent outputs.

=== Quattro LNBs ===
A special type of LNB (not to be confused with Quad LNB) intended for use in a shared dish installation to deliver signals to any number of tuners. A quattro LNB has a single feedhorn and four outputs, which each supply just one of the K_{u} sub-bands (low band/horizontal polarization, high band/vertical polarization, low/vertical and high/horizontal) to a multiswitch or an array of multiswitches, which then delivers to each connected tuner whichever sub-band is required by that tuner.

Although a quattro LNB typically looks similar to a quad LNB, it cannot (sensibly) be connected to receivers directly. Note again the difference between a quad and a quattro LNB: A quad LNB can drive four tuners directly, with each output providing signals from the entire K_{u} band. A quattro LNB is for connection to a multiswitch in a shared dish distribution system and each output provides only a quarter of the K_{u} band signals.

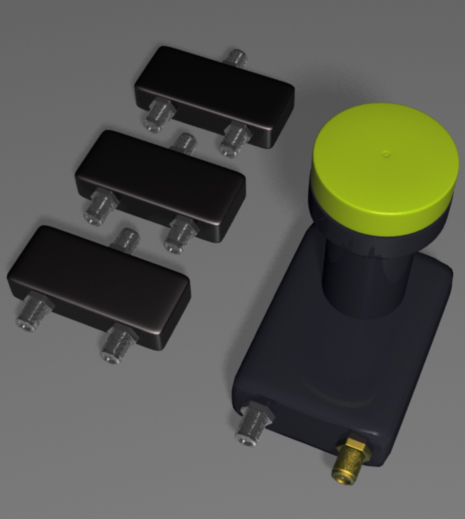
SCR LNB with three SCR taps for daisy-chaining multiple tuners

=== Satellite channel router (SCR), or unicable LNBs ===
Multiple tuners may also be fed from a satellite channel router (SCR) or unicable LNB in a single cable distribution system. A Unicable LNB has one output connector but operates in a different way to standard LNBs so it can feed multiple tuners daisy-chained along a single coax cable.

Instead of block-downconverting the whole received spectrum, an SCR LNB downconverts a small section of the received signal (equivalent to the bandwidth of a single transponder on the satellite) selected according to a DiSEqC-compliant command from the receiver, to output at a fixed frequency in the IF. Up to 32 tuners can be allocated a different frequency in the IF range and for each, the SCR LNB downconverts the corresponding individually requested transponder.

Most SCR LNBs also include either a legacy mode of operation or a separate legacy output which provides the received spectrum block-downconverted to the whole IF range in the conventional way.

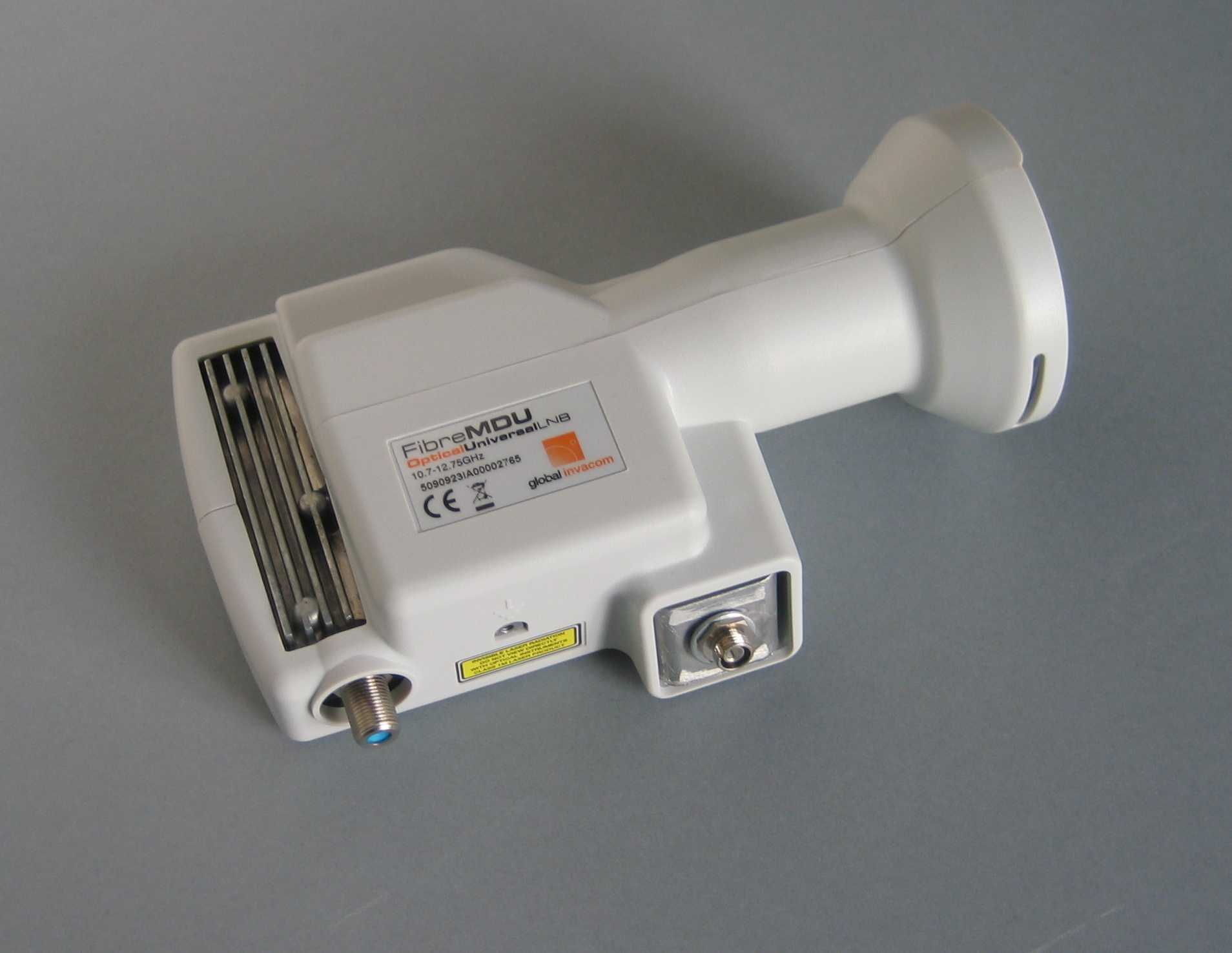
An optical fibre LNB (with fibre connection and conventional F-connector for power input)

=== Wideband LNB ===
ASTRA Universal Wideband LNBs with an oscillator frequency of 10.40 or 10.41 GHz are entering the market. The intermediate frequency band is much wider than in a conventional LNB, as the high and low band are not split up.

Wideband LNB signals can be accepted by new wideband tuners, and by new SCR systems (e.g., Inverto/Fuba, Unitron, Optel, GT-Sat/Astro), with or without optical transmission. Wideband signals can be converted to conventional quattro signals and vice versa.

In February 2016, Sky (UK) launched a new LNB only compatible with their new wideband tuner. This LNB has one port for all vertical polarised channels both low and high band, and another port for all low and high band horizontal channels. The basic model has only 2 connections and presumably has a local oscillator of 10.41 GHz with an intermediate frequency of 290–2340 MHz from an input of 10.7–12.75 GHz. This LNB seems to be the same as Unitron's ASTRA Universal Wideband LNB. Two cables minimum are needed to access all channels. In the Sky Q box, multiple tuners can select multiple channels, more than the usual two for dual coax systems. This type of LNB is incompatible with the more common Astra Universal LNB used in the UK meaning the LNB is changed during upgrade. There is a model of the LNB with 6 connections, 2 for Sky Q and 4 Astra Universal LNB for users with multiple legacy systems such as Freesat in addition to Sky Q. In cases where only a single cable is possible, such as apartment blocks, Sky Q compatible multiswitches can be used, which instead use BSkyB SCR.

== Optical-fibre LNBs ==
LNBs for fibre satellite distribution systems operate in a similar way to conventional electrical LNBs, except that all four of the sub-bands in the entire K_{u} band spectrum of 10.70–12.75 GHz across two signal polarisations are simultaneously block-downconverted (as in a quattro LNB). The four sub-bands’ IFs are stacked to create one IF with a range of 0.95–5.45 GHz (a bandwidth of 4.5 GHz), which is modulated on an optical signal using a semiconductor laser, to send down the fibre cable.

At the receiver, the optical signal is converted back to the traditional electrical signal to "appear" to the receiver as a conventional LNB.

== Monoblock LNBs ==
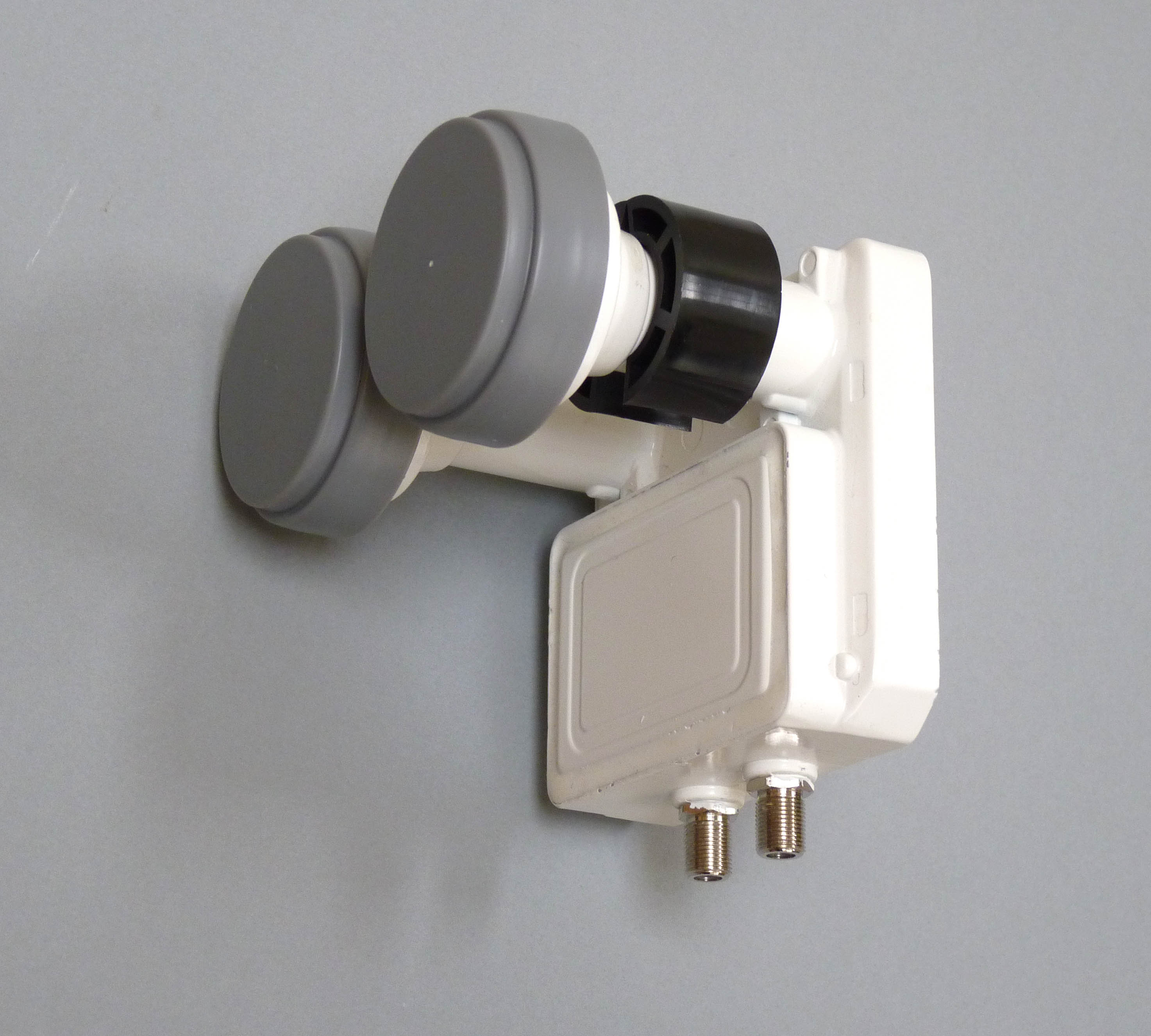
A twin-output monoblock LNBF for Astra 19.2°E and Hot Bird with a collar size adapter fitted

A monoblock (or monobloc) LNB is a single unit comprising two, three or four LNBs and a DiSEqC switch, designed to receive signals from two, three or four satellites spaced close together and to feed the selected signal to the receiver. The feedhorns of the two LNBs are at a fixed distance apart for reception of satellites of a particular orbital separation (often 6°, but also 4°). Although the same functionality can be achieved with separate LNBs and a switch, a monoblock LNB, constructed in one unit, is more convenient to install and enables the two feedhorns to be closer together than individually cased LNBs (typically 60mm diameter). The distance between the feedhorns depends on the orbital separation of the satellites to be received, the diameter and focal length of the dish used, and the position of the reception site relative to the satellites. So monoblock LNBs are usually a compromise solution designed to operate with standard dishes in a particular region. For example, in parts of Europe, monoblocks designed to receive the Hot Bird and Astra 19.2°E satellites are popular because they enable reception of both satellites on a single dish without requiring an expensive, slow and noisy motorised dish. A similar advantage is provided by the duo LNB for simultaneous reception of signals from both the Astra 23.5°E and Astra 19.2°E positions.

There are also available triple monoblock LNB units, which enable users to receive three satellites:

for example Hotbird 13°E, Eutelsat 16°E and Astra 19.2°E or the same can be used for positions: Eutelsat 7°E, Eutelsat 10°E and Hotbird 13°E. This monoblock can be used for other positions with the same spacing (3°+3°=6°spacing).

Other very popular example for different spacing is: Astra 1: 19.2°E, Astra 3: 23.5°E and Astra 2: 28.2°E (4.3°+4.7°=9°spacing).

And there are also available four feed monoblock LNB units, which enable users to receive signals from four satellites, for example Eurobird 9°E, Hotbird 13°E, Astra 19.2°E and Astra 23.5°E (4°+6.2°+4.3°=14.5°spacing).

Most receivers sold nowadays are compatible with at least DiSeqC 1.0 which allows to switch automatically between 4 satellites (all of contemporary Monoblock LNBs), as user changes channel on remote control.

== Cold temperatures ==
It is possible for moisture in an LNB to freeze, causing ice to build-up at very low temperatures. This is only likely to occur when the LNB is not receiving power from the satellite receiver (i.e., no programmes are being watched). To combat this, many satellite receivers provide an option to keep the LNB powered while the receiver is on standby. In fact, most LNBs are kept powered because this helps to stabilise the temperature and, thereby, the local oscillator frequency by the dissipated heat from the circuitry of LNB. In the case of UK BSkyB receivers, the LNB remains powered while in standby so that the receiver can receive firmware updates and Electronic Programme Guide updates. In the United States, the LNB connected to a Dish Network receiver remains powered so the system can receive software and firmware updates and guide information over the air at night. In Turkey, another LNB type Digiturk MDUs are kept powered to receive VOD content, STB firmware, EPG data, and pay-TV keys in order to watch encrypted content.

== See also ==
- Bias tee
- Block upconverter (BUC)
- Orthomode transducer
- Signal-to-noise ratio
- Transmit and receive integrated assembly (TRIA)
- Duo LNB
- Single Cable Distribution
- Fibre satellite distribution
