= DiSEqC =

Communication protocol for satellite receivers

- DiSEqC logo, indicating DiSEqC 2.0 compliance
- Developed by: Eutelsat
- Introduced: 1977

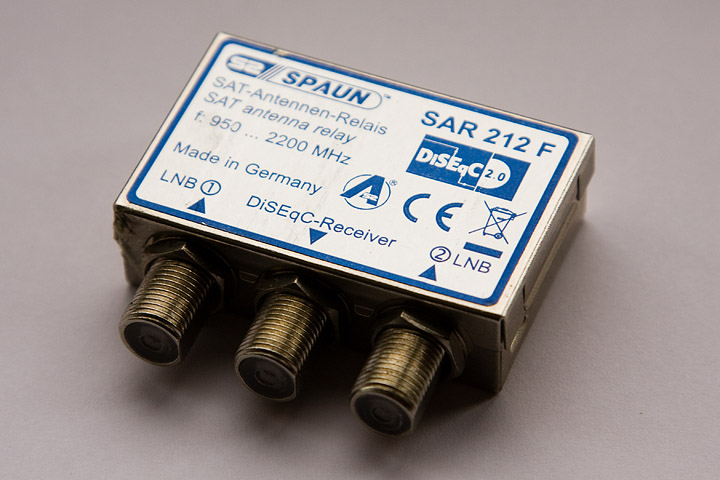
2-way DiSEqC switch

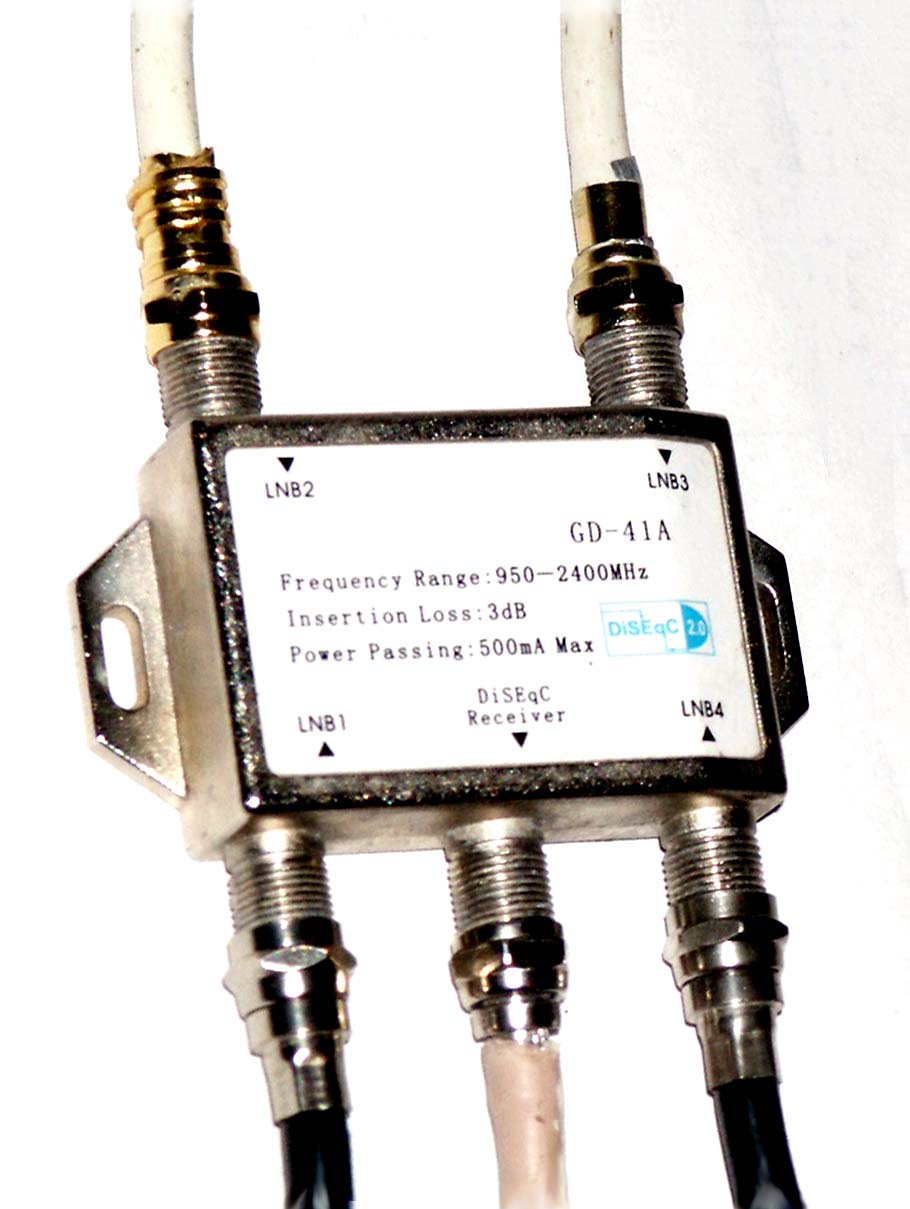
4-way DiSEqC switch with attached coaxial cables.

Digital Satellite Equipment Control (DiSEqC) (/ˈdaɪsɛk, daɪˈsɛksi/) is a communication protocol between a satellite receiver and a device such as a multi-dish switch or a small dish antenna rotor. DiSEqC was developed by European satellite provider Eutelsat, which now acts as the standards agency for the protocol.

== History ==
Eutelsat apparently developed the system to allow satellite users in Continental Europe to switch between the more popular SES Astra satellites at 19.2° east and Eutelsat's own Hot Bird system at 13° east. As a result, the vast majority of European satellite receivers support DiSEqC 1.0 or higher, with the exception of all set top boxes manufactured under the Sky Digibox name. All supporting receivers have received certification to carry a logo specifying which variation of DiSEqC they support.

== Protocol ==
DiSEqC relies only upon a coaxial cable to transmit both bidirectional data/signals and power. DiSEqC is commonly used to control switches and motors, and is more flexible than 13/18 Volt and 22 kHz tone or ToneBurst/MiniDiSEqC techniques. DiSEqC is also compatible with the actuators used to rotate large C band dishes if used with a DiSEqC positioner. DiSEqC uses a pulsed (tone-burst) 22 kHz sine-wave at 0.65 V (± 0.25 V) peak to peak.

The "Di" (digital) part of the name refers to the digital nature of the signals used by the protocol and does not imply anything about the transmission that the dish is used to receive; DiSEqC may be used with both digital and analogue satellite systems.

== Versions and compatibility ==
A number of versions of DiSEqC exist:

- DiSEqC 1.0, which allows switching between up to 4 satellite sources
- DiSEqC 1.1, which allows switching between up to 16 sources
- DiSEqC 1.2, which allows switching between up to 16 sources, and control of a single axis satellite motor
- DiSEqC 2.0, which adds bi-directional communications to DiSEqC 1.0
- DiSEqC 2.1, which adds bi-directional communications to DiSEqC 1.1
- DiSEqC 2.2, which adds bi-directional communications to DiSEqC 1.2
- DiSEqC 3.0, which adds remote management of receivers to DiSEqC 2.2 to enable broadcast house uses

First four variations were standardized by February 1998, prior to general use of digital satellite television. The later versions are backwards compatible with the lower revisions, but the lower revisions are, as might be expected, not forwards compatible with the higher revision numbers. 1.x and 2.x versions are both backwards and forwards compatible.

The terms DiSEqC 1.3 and 2.3 are also often used by manufacturers and retailers to refer to the use of DiSEqC with other protocols. For example, 1.3 usually refers to a receiver which uses USALS in conjunction with the DiSEqC 1.2 protocol. Such terminology has not been authorised by Eutelsat.

The following table shows compatibility between the various DiSEqC versions:

	1.0 switch	1.1 switch	1.2 motor	2.0 switch	2.1 switch	2.2 motor	3.0 receiver	3.0 antenna-side
1.0 receiver	Yes	No	No	Yes	No	No	Yes	No
1.1 receiver	Yes	Yes	No	Yes	Yes	No	Yes	No
1.2 receiver	Yes	Yes	Yes	Yes	Yes	Yes	Yes	No
2.0 receiver	Yes	No	No	Yes	No	No	Yes	No
2.1 receiver	Yes	Yes	No	Yes	Yes	No	Yes	No
2.2 receiver	Yes	Yes	Yes	Yes	Yes	Yes	Yes	No
3.0 broadcast house	No	No	No	No	No	No	Yes	Yes
3.0 antenna-side	Yes	Yes	Yes	Yes	Yes	Yes	Yes	Yes

NOTE: a 1.x receiver will not be able to receive communication from a switch or motor. Usually this is not important, as the switch or motor can be controlled by the receiver without problems.

== See also ==
- USALS = Universal Satellites Automatic Location System
- Monoblock LNB - LNB with builtin DiSEqC switch, used for multiple streams on a single dish
- SAT>IP - A modern alternative to DiSEqC which uses an IP-based network to deliver multiple DVB streams
- SES
- Astra
- Eutelsat
- Astra 19.2°E
- Automatic Tracking Satellite Dish
- Starlink Dish
