= Telstar =

Name of various communications satellites

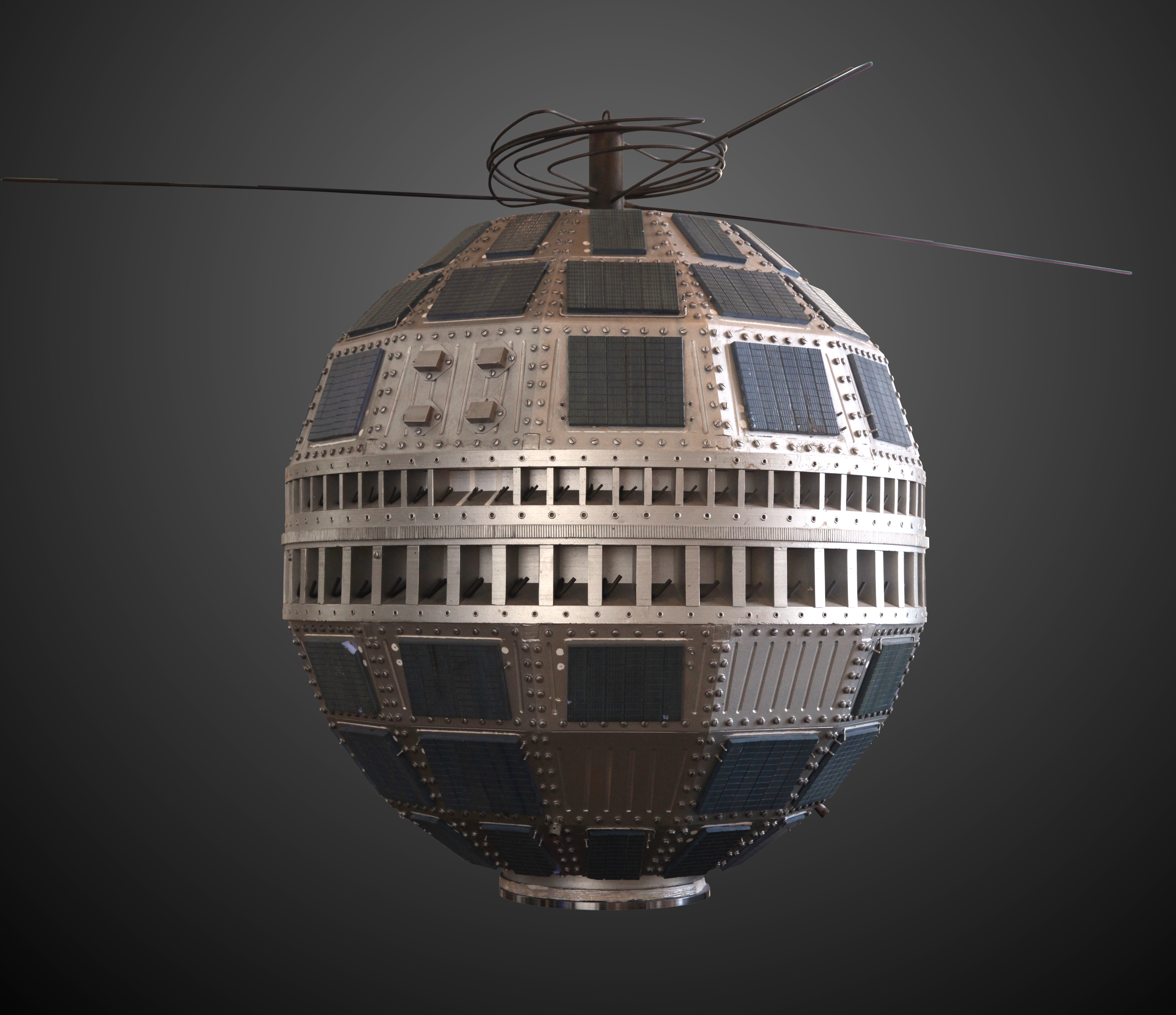
- Model of a Telstar satellite, on display at Conservatoire national des arts et métiers
- Manufacturer: Hughes, EADS Astrium, Space Systems/Loral, Airbus Defence and Space
- Country of origin: United States
- Operator: AT&T, Telesat
- Applications: Communications

Specifications
- Regime: Medium Earth / Geostationary

Production
- Status: In service
- Launched: 21

Universal newsreel about Telstar 1

Telstar is a series of communications satellites. The first two, Telstar 1 and Telstar 2, were experimental and nearly identical. Telstar 1 was launched atop a Thor-Delta rocket on July 10, 1962, and relayed the first television pictures, telephone calls, and telegraph images through space. It also provided the first live transatlantic television feed. Telstar 2 was launched May 7, 1963. Telstar 1 and 2—though no longer functional—still orbit the Earth.

== Description ==
External audio
- Felker Talking Telstar, 1962, Dr. Jean Felker's speech starts at 4:20, WNYC

Belonging to AT&T, the original Telstar was part of a multi-national agreement among AT&T (USA), Bell Telephone Laboratories (USA), NASA (USA), GPO (United Kingdom) and the direction générale des Télécommunications (France) to develop experimental satellite communications over the Atlantic Ocean. Bell Labs held a contract with NASA, paying the agency for each launch, independent of success.

Six ground stations were built to communicate with Telstar, one each in the US, France, the UK, Canada, West Germany and Italy. The American ground station—built by Bell Labs—was Andover Earth Station, in Andover, Maine. The main British ground station was at Goonhilly Downs, Cornwall. The BBC, as international coordinator, used this location. The standards 525/405 conversion equipment (filling a large room) was researched and developed by the BBC and located in the BBC Television Centre, London. The French ground station was at Pleumeur-Bodou. (Note: Pleumeur-Bodou (48°47′10″N 3°31′26″W)) The Canadian ground station was at Charleston, Nova Scotia. The German ground station was at Raisting in Bavaria. The Italian ground station (Fucino Space Centre) was at Fucino, near Avezzano, in Abruzzo.

The satellite was built by a team at Bell Telephone Laboratories that included John Robinson Pierce, who created the project; Rudy Kompfner, who invented the traveling-wave tube transponder that the satellite used; and James M. Early, who designed its transistors and solar panels. The satellite is roughly spherical, measures 34.5 inches (880 mm) in length, and weighs about 170 lb (77 kg). Its dimensions were limited by what would fit on one of NASA's Delta rockets. Telstar was spin-stabilized, and its outer surface was covered with solar cells capable of generating 14 watts of electrical power.

The original Telstar had a single innovative transponder that could relay data, a single television channel, or multiplexed telephone circuits. Since the spacecraft spun, it required an array of antennas around its "equator" for uninterrupted microwave communication with Earth. An omnidirectional array of small cavity antenna elements around the satellite's "equator" received 6 GHz microwave signals to relay back to ground stations. The transponder converted the frequency to 4 GHz, amplified the signals in a traveling-wave tube, and retransmitted them omnidirectionally via the adjacent array of larger box-shaped cavities. The prominent helical antenna received telecommands from a ground station.

Launched by NASA aboard a Delta rocket from Cape Canaveral on July 10, 1962, Telstar 1 was the first privately sponsored space launch. A medium-altitude satellite, Telstar was placed into an elliptical orbit completed once every 2 hours and 37 minutes, inclined at an angle of approximately 45 degrees to the equator, with perigee about 952 km (592 mi) from Earth and apogee about 5,933 km (3,687 mi) from Earth This is in contrast to the 1965 Early Bird Intelsat and subsequent satellites that travel in circular geostationary orbits.

Due to its non-geosynchronous orbit, similar to a Molniya orbit, availability of Telstar 1 for transatlantic signals was limited to the 30 minutes in each 2.5-hour orbit when the satellite passed over the Atlantic Ocean. Ground antennas had to track the satellite with a pointing error of less than 0.06 degrees as it moved across the sky at up to 1.5 degrees per second.

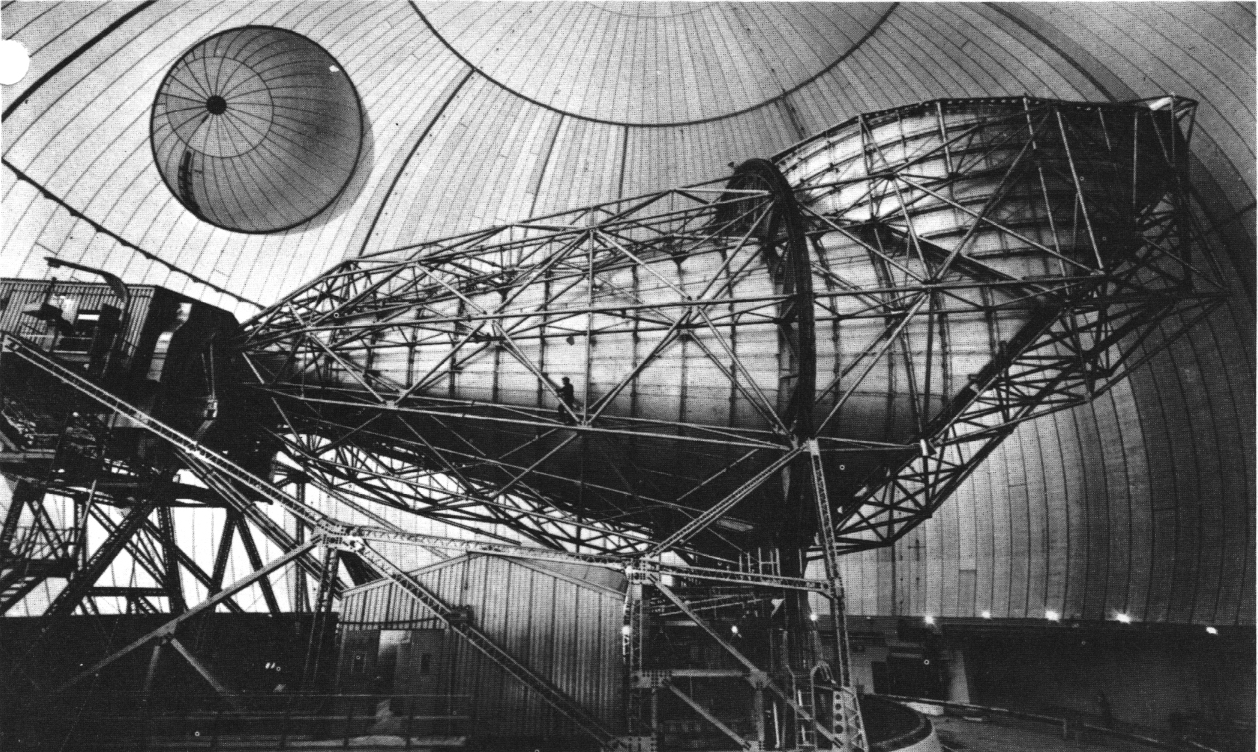
177 ft. long horn antenna at AT&T's satellite ground station in Andover, Maine, built to communicate with Telstar

Since the transmitters and receivers on Telstar were not powerful, ground antennas had to be 90 ft (27 m) tall. Bell Laboratory engineers designed a large horizontal conical horn antenna with a parabolic reflector at its mouth that re-directed the beam. This particular design had very low sidelobes, and thus made very low receiving system noise temperatures possible. The aperture of the antennas was 3,600 sq ft (330 m^{2}). The antennas were 177 ft (54 m) long and weighed 380 short tons (340,000 kg). Morimi Iwama and Jan Norton of Bell Laboratories were in charge of designing and building the electrical portions of the azimuth-elevation system that steered the antennas. The antennas were housed in radomes the size of a 14-story office building. Two of these antennas were used, one in Andover, Maine, and the other in France at Pleumeur-Bodou. The GPO antenna at Goonhilly Downs in Great Britain was a conventional 26-meter-diameter paraboloid.

== In service ==
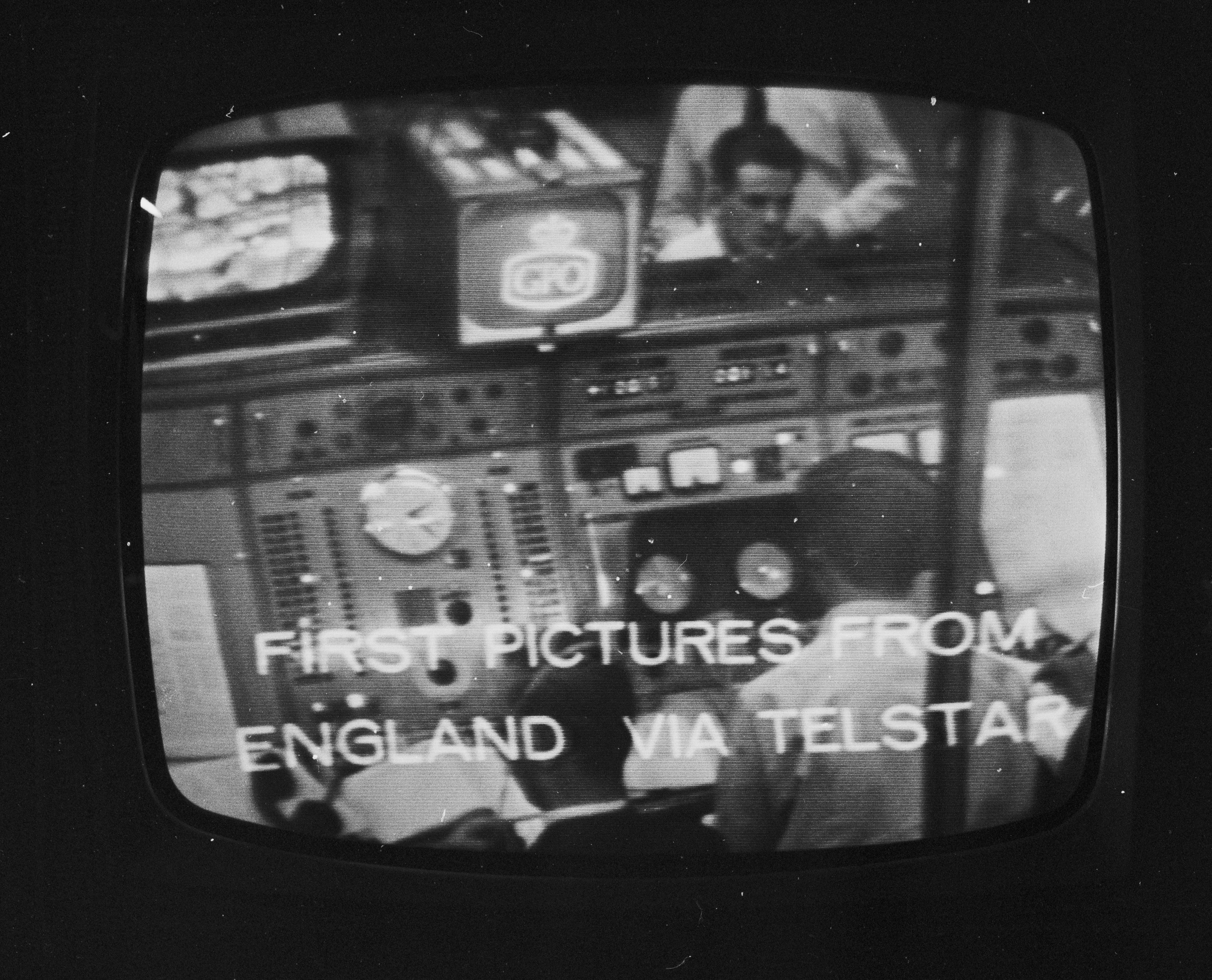
A photograph of a monitor during the first test of Telstar 1 on July 11, 1962

Telstar 1 relayed its first, and non-public, television pictures—a flag outside Andover Earth Station—to Pleumeur-Bodou on July 11, 1962. Almost two weeks later, on July 23, at 3:00 p.m. EDT, it relayed the first publicly available live transatlantic television signal. The broadcast was shown in Europe by Eurovision and in North America by NBC, CBS, ABC, and the CBC. The first public broadcast featured CBS's Walter Cronkite and NBC's Chet Huntley in New York, and the BBC's Richard Dimbleby in Brussels. The first pictures were the Statue of Liberty in New York and the Eiffel Tower in Paris. The first broadcast was to have included remarks by President John F. Kennedy, but the signal was acquired before the president was ready, so engineers filled the lead-in time with a short segment of a WGN telecast of a live game between the Philadelphia Phillies and the Chicago Cubs at Wrigley Field. The Phillies' second baseman Tony Taylor was seen hitting a ball pitched by the Cubs' Cal Koonce to deep right field, caught by fielder George Altman for the out. From there, the video switched first to Washington, DC; then to Cape Canaveral, Florida; to the Seattle World's Fair; then to Quebec and finally to Stratford, Ontario. The Washington segment included remarks by President Kennedy, talking about the price of the American dollar, which was causing concern in Europe. When Kennedy denied that the United States would devalue the dollar it immediately strengthened on world markets; Cronkite later said that "we all glimpsed something of the true power of the instrument we had wrought."

That evening, Telstar 1 also relayed the first satellite telephone call, between U.S. vice-president Lyndon Johnson and the chairman of AT&T, Frederick Kappel. It successfully transmitted faxes, data, and both live and taped television, including the first live transmission of television across an ocean from Andover, Maine, US, to Goonhilly Downs, England, and Pleumeur-Bodou, France. (An experimental passive satellite, Echo 1, had been used to reflect and redirect communications signals two years earlier, in 1960.) In August 1962, Telstar 1 became the first satellite used to synchronize time between two continents, bringing the United Kingdom and the United States to within 1 microsecond of each other (previous efforts were accurate to only 2,000 microseconds).

The Telstar 1 satellite also relayed computer data between two IBM 1401 computers. The test, performed on October 25, 1962, sent a message from a transmitting computer in Endicott, New York, to the earth station in Andover, Maine. The message was relayed to the earth station in France, where it was decoded by a second IBM 1401 in La Gaude, France.

Telstar 1, which had ushered in a new age of the commercial use of technology, became a victim of the military technology of the Cold War era. The day before Telstar 1 launched, a U.S. high-altitude nuclear bomb (called Starfish Prime) had energized the Earth's Van Allen Belt where Telstar 1 went into orbit. This vast increase in a radiation belt, combined with subsequent high-altitude blasts, including a Soviet test in October, overwhelmed Telstar's fragile transistors. It went out of service in November 1962, after handling over 400 telephone, telegraph, facsimile, and television transmissions. It was restarted by a workaround in early January 1963. The additional radiation associated with its return to full sunlight once again caused a transistor failure, this time irreparably, and Telstar 1 went back out of service on February 21, 1963.

Experiments continued, and by 1964, two Telstars, two Relay units (from RCA), and two Syncom units (from the Hughes Aircraft Company) had operated successfully in space. Syncom 2 was the first geosynchronous satellite and its successor, Syncom 3, broadcast pictures from the 1964 Summer Olympics in Tokyo. The first commercial geosynchronous satellite was Intelsat I ("Early Bird") launched in 1965.

Telstar was considered a technical success. According to a US. Information Agency (USIA) poll, Telstar was better known in Great Britain than Sputnik had been in 1957.

== Newer Telstars ==
Subsequent Telstar satellites were advanced commercial geosynchronous spacecraft that share only their name with Telstar 1 and 2.

The second wave of Telstar satellites launched with Telstar 301 in 1983, followed by Telstar 302 in 1984 (which was renamed Telstar 3C after it was carried into space by Shuttle mission STS-41-D), and by Telstar 303 in 1985.

The next wave, starting with Telstar 401, came in 1993; which was lost in 1997 due to a magnetic storm, and then Telstar 402 was destroyed shortly after launch in 1994. It was replaced in 1995 by Telstar 402R, eventually renamed Telstar 4.

Telstar 10 was launched in China in 1997 by APT Satellite Company, Ltd.

In 2003, Telstars 4–8 and 13—Loral Skynet's North American fleet—were sold to Intelsat. Telstar 4 suffered complete failure prior to the handover. The others were renamed the Intelsat Americas 5, 6, etc. At the time of the sale, Telstar 8 was still under construction by Space Systems/Loral, and it was finally launched on June 23, 2005, by Sea Launch.

Telstar 18 was launched in June 2004 by Sea Launch. The upper stage of the rocket underperformed, but the satellite used its significant stationkeeping fuel margin to achieve its operational geostationary orbit. It has enough on-board fuel remaining to allow it to exceed its specified 13-year design life.

Telesat launched Telstar 12 Vantage in November 2015 on a H2A204 variant of the H-IIA rocket, and it commenced service in December 2015.

Telstar 19V was launched on 22 July 2018.

Telstar 18V was launched on 10 September 2018, on a SpaceX Falcon 9.

== Satellites ==
Name	Manufacturer	Launch date	Launch vehicle	Launch place	Orbital position	Bus	Mass
Telstar 1	Bell Laboratories	July 10, 1962	Delta-DM19	Cape Canaveral LC-17B	—N/a	Telstar Bus	77 kg (170 lb)
Telstar 2	Bell Laboratories	May 7, 1963	Delta B	Cape Canaveral LC-17B	—N/a	Telstar Bus	79 kg (174 lb)
Telstar 301	Hughes	July 28, 1983	Delta-3920 PAM-D	Cape Canaveral LC-17A	76° W	HS-376	625 kg (1,378 lb)
Telstar 302	Hughes	August 30, 1984	Space Shuttle Discovery	Kennedy LC-39A	125° W	HS-376	625 kg (1,378 lb)
Telstar 303	Hughes	June 17, 1985	Space Shuttle Discovery	Kennedy LC-39A	76° W	HS-376	630 kg (1,390 lb)
Telstar 401	Lockheed Martin	December 16, 1993	Atlas IIAS AC-108	Cape Canaveral LC-36B	97° W	AS-7000	3,375 kg (7,441 lb)
Telstar 402	Lockheed Martin	September 9, 1994	Ariane 42L	Kourou ELA-2	89° W planned	AS-7000	3,485 kg (7,683 lb)
Telstar 4	Lockheed Martin	September 24, 1995	Ariane 42L	Kourou ELA-2	89° W	AS-7000	3,410 kg (7,520 lb)
Telstar 5	Space Systems/Loral	May 24, 1997	Proton-K/Block-DM4	Baikonur 81/23	97° W	SSL 1300	3,600 kg (7,900 lb)
Telstar 6	Space Systems/Loral	February 15, 1999	Proton-K/Block-DM3	Baikonur 81/23	93° W	SSL 1300	3,763 kg (8,296 lb)
Telstar 7	Space Systems/Loral	September 25, 1999	Ariane 44LP	Kourou ELA-2	127° W	SSL 1300	3,790 kg (8,360 lb)
Telstar 8	Space Systems/Loral	June 23, 2005	Zenit-3SL	Sea Launch	89° W	SSL 1300S	5,493 kg (12,110 lb)
Telstar 9 (not launched)	Space Systems/Loral	—N/a	—N/a	—N/a	—N/a	SSL 1300S	5,493 kg (12,110 lb)
Telstar 10	Space Systems/Loral	October 16, 1997	Long March 3B	Xichang 3B	76,5° E	SSL 1300	3,700 kg (8,200 lb)
Telstar 11	Matra Marconi Space	November 29, 1994	Atlas IIA	Cape Canaveral LC-36A	37,5° W	Eurostar-2000	2,361 kg (5,205 lb)
Telstar 11N	Space Systems/Loral	February 26, 2009	Zenit-3SLB	Baikonur 45/1	37,5° W	SSL 1300	4,012 kg (8,845 lb)
Telstar 12	Space Systems/Loral	October 19, 1999	Ariane 44LP	Kourou ELA-2	15° W	SSL 1300	3,814 kg (8,408 lb)
Telstar 12V	EADS Astrium	November 24, 2015	H-IIA-204	Tanegashima YLP-1	15° W	Eurostar-3000	5,000 kg (11,000 lb)
Telstar 13	Space Systems/Loral	August 8, 2003	Zenit-3SL	Sea Launch	121° W	SSL 1300	4,737 kg (10,443 lb)
Telstar 14	Space Systems/Loral	January 11, 2004	Zenit-3SL	Sea Launch	63° W	SSL 1300	4,694 kg (10,348 lb)
Telstar 14R	Space Systems/Loral	May 20, 2011	Proton-M/Briz-M	Baikonur 200/39	63° W	SSL 1300	5,000 kg (11,000 lb)
Telstar 18	Space Systems/Loral	June 29, 2004	Zenit-3SL	Sea Launch	138° E	SSL 1300	4,640 kg (10,230 lb)
Telstar 18V	Space Systems/Loral	September 10, 2018	Falcon 9 B5	Cape Canaveral SLC-40	138° E	SSL 1300	7,060 kg (15,560 lb)
Telstar 19V	Space Systems/Loral	July 22, 2018	Falcon 9 B5	Cape Canaveral SLC-40	63° W	SSL 1300	7,076 kg (15,600 lb)

== See also ==
- Telstar (instrumental)
- List of communications satellite firsts
- SC Telstar Dutch professional football club
