= Telstar 12 =

Communications satellite

- Names: Orion 2 (1999); Telstar 12 (2000—)
- Mission type: Communications
- Operator: Loral Skynet (1999-07); Telesat (2007—)
- COSPAR ID: 1999-059A
- SATCAT no.: 25949
- Mission duration: 15 years

Spacecraft properties
- Bus: LS-1300E
- Manufacturer: Space Systems/Loral
- Launch mass: 3,814 kilograms (8,408 lb)
- Power: 10.6 kilowatts

Start of mission
- Launch date: 19 October 1999, 06:22 UTC
- Rocket: Ariane 44LP H10-3
- Launch site: Kourou ELA-2
- Contractor: Arianespace

Orbital parameters
- Reference system: Geocentric
- Regime: Geostationary
- Longitude: 15° west
- Perigee altitude: 35,780 kilometres (22,230 mi)
- Apogee altitude: 35,805 kilometres (22,248 mi)
- Inclination: 0.01 degrees
- Period: 23.93 hours
- Epoch: 29 October 2013, 07:55:57 UTC

Transponders
- Band: 38 Ku-band
- Frequency: Uplink: 13.75-14.5 gigahertz Downlink: 10.95-12.75 gigahertz
- Bandwidth: 54 megahertz
- Coverage area: North America; Caribbean; South America; Europe; Middle East; South Africa

Telstar 12, previously known as Orion 2, is a Canadian communications satellite in the Telstar series which is operated by Telesat. It was originally built for Orion Network Systems, which merged with Loral Skynet shortly before the satellite was launched. It was subsequently transferred to Telesat when it merged with Loral Skynet in 2007.

Telstar 12 is a K_{u} band satellite with coverage of North America as far west as Cleveland, Ohio, the majority of South America and Europe. Telstar 12 also has the capability to provide intercontinental connectivity including trans-Atlantic to the Mid-East. Eutelsat uses four transponders on the satellite for services between Europe and the Americas.

On 1Q 2016, Telstar 12 was replaced in its orbital position with Telstar 12 Vantage satellite.

== See also ==
- Telstar
- Telesat
