= Nimiq-5 =

Canadian commercial communications satellite

- Mission type: Communications
- Operator: Telesat Canada
- COSPAR ID: 2009-050A
- SATCAT no.: 35873
- Mission duration: 15 years (planned)

Spacecraft properties
- Bus: LS-1300
- Manufacturer: Space Systems/Loral
- Launch mass: 4,745 kg (10,461 lb)

Start of mission
- Launch date: 17 September 2009, 19:19:19 UTC
- Rocket: Proton-M / Briz-M
- Launch site: Baikonur, Site 200/39
- Contractor: International Launch Services (ILS)

Orbital parameters
- Reference system: Geocentric orbit
- Regime: Geostationary orbit
- Longitude: 72.7° West

Transponders
- Band: 32 Ku-band
- Coverage area: North America
- EIRP: 40.5 - 52.5 (varies by transponder and latitude)

Nimiq-5 is a Canadian communications satellite, operated by Telesat Canada as part of its Nimiq fleet of satellites. It is positioned in geostationary orbit at a longitude of 72.7° West of the Greenwich Meridian. As of July 2015, EchoStar Corporation leases almost the entire capacity of the satellite to provide high-definition television direct-to-home broadcasting for Dish Network Corporation.The only exception is a single 1080p MPEG4 Stream used by the Legislative Assembly of Ontario. When accessed using a multi-satellite receiver such as the VIP722k and a multi-satellite dish/LNB combo, such as the Dish-300, Dish-500, or Dish-Turbo 1000.4, the satellite is referred to by the on-screen diagnostics as Echostar 72 W.

== Spacecraft ==
Nimiq-5 was built by Space Systems/Loral, and is based on the LS-1300 satellite bus. The contract to build it was announced on 4 January 2007. At launch, it will have a mass of 4,745 kg (10,461 lb), and is expected to operate for fifteen years. It carries 32 Ku-band transponders.

== Launch ==
Nimiq-5 was launched by International Launch Services (ILS), using a Proton-M launch vehicle with a Briz-M upper stage, under a contract signed in April 2007. The launch was conducted from Site 200/39 at the Baikonur Cosmodrome in Kazakhstan, at 19:19:19 UTC on 17 September 2009. The Briz-M separated from the Proton-M nine minutes and forty one seconds into the flight and subsequently made five burns before releasing Nimiq-5 into a geosynchronous transfer orbit nine hours and fifteen minutes after liftoff.

== See also ==
- 2009 in spaceflight
