= Telstar 11 =

Canadian communications satellite

Telstar 11 (former Orion 1) is a communication satellite in the Telstar series of the Canadian satellite communications company Telesat. The satellite was launched on 29 November 1994.
