= Telstar 18V =

Canadian commercial communications satellite

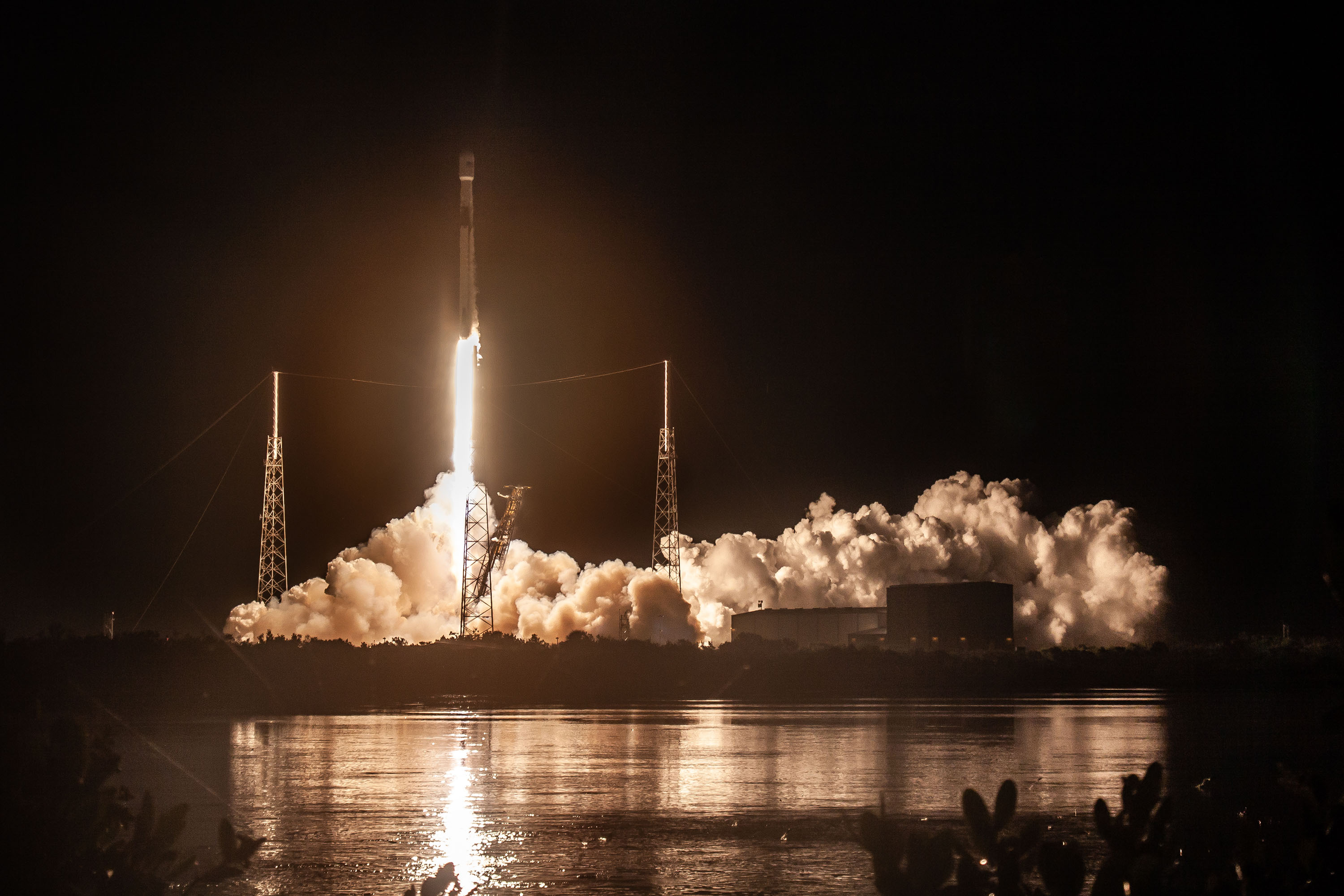
- Launch of Telstar 18V
- Names: Telstar 18 Vantage; Apstar-5C
- Mission type: Communications
- Operator: Telstar
- COSPAR ID: 2018-068C
- SATCAT no.: 43611
- Mission duration: 15 years (planned); 7 years, 7 months, 18 days (elapsed)

Spacecraft properties
- Bus: SSL-1300
- Manufacturer: SSL
- Launch mass: 7,060 kg (15,560 lb)
- Power: 14 kW

Start of mission
- Launch date: 10 September 2018, UTC
- Rocket: Falcon 9 B1049-1
- Launch site: Cape Canaveral, SLC-40
- Contractor: SpaceX
- Entered service: October 2018

Orbital parameters
- Reference system: Geocentric orbit
- Regime: Geostationary orbit
- Longitude: 138° East

Transponders
- Band: 64 transponders: Ku-band, C-band
- Coverage area: Asia

Telstar 18V (Telstar 18 Vantage / APStar 5C) is a communication satellite in the Telstar series of the Canadian satellite communications company Telesat. T18V will be equipped with C and Ku-band transponders and operate from 138° East. At 7,060 kilograms (15,560 lb), it is the second-heaviest communication satellite ever launched, weighing slightly less than its sibling Telstar 19V.

== Launch ==
Telstar 18V was launched on a SpaceX Falcon 9 Block 5 rocket from Space Launch Complex 40 (SLC40) at Cape Canaveral Air Force Station, Space Coast, Florida, United States, on September 10, 2018, at 12:45 AM EDT (4:45 UTC). It was deployed into a subsynchronous transfer orbit (lower than the typical geostationary transfer orbit (GTO)) approximately 32 minutes after rocket's liftoff.
