= S66 =

S66 may refer to:

- S66 (Long Island bus)
- S66 (New York City bus) serving Staten Island Island
- Awabakal language
- Daihatsu Hijet (S66), a Japanese kei truck
- Explorer S-66, a failed American spacecraft
- Savoia-Marchetti S.66, an Italian flying boat
- S66, a postcode district for Rotherham, England
- Siemens S66, a Siemens mobile phone
- Homedale Municipal Airport (ICAO Code S66) in Homedale, Idaho
