= Nimiq-4 =

Canadian commercial communications satellite

- Mission type: High-definition television (HDTV)
- Operator: Telesat Canada
- COSPAR ID: 2008-044A
- SATCAT no.: 33373
- Mission duration: 15 years (planned)

Spacecraft properties
- Spacecraft type: Nimiq
- Bus: Eurostar-3000S
- Manufacturer: EADS Astrium
- Launch mass: 4,850 kg (10,690 lb)
- Power: 12 kW

Start of mission
- Launch date: 19 September 2008, 21:48:00 UTC
- Rocket: Proton-M / Briz-M
- Launch site: Baikonur, Site 200/39
- Contractor: International Launch Services (ILS)

Orbital parameters
- Reference system: Geocentric orbit
- Regime: Geostationary orbit
- Longitude: 82.0° West

Transponders
- Band: 32 Ku-band, 8 Ka-band
- Coverage area: North America

Nimiq-4 is a Canadian geosynchronous communications satellite. It was launched aboard a Proton-M / Briz-M launch vehicle at 21:48:00 UTC on 19 September 2008. It was positioned at 82.0° West longitude, and operated by Telesat Canada.

== Spacecraft ==
The satellite was constructed by EADS Astrium, using a Eurostar-3000S bus. It is powered by two solar panels, with a span of 39 m (128 ft), producing 12 kW of power. The launch mass of the satellite is 4,850 kg (10,690 lb), with fuel. It carries 40 transponders, 32 of which operate in the Ku-band, and 8 which operate in the Ka-band. It provides digital HDTV to Canada and United States.

== See also ==
- Nimiq
