= 12v =

12v may refer to:

- Telstar 12V
- Aviadvigatel PD-12V
- Antonov An-12V
- A common voltage for car batteries
