= Telstar 2 =

Defunct Communications Satellite

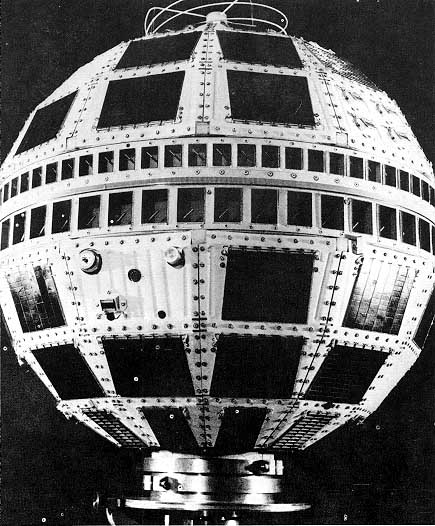
- Telstar 2
- Mission type: Communications
- Operator: AT&T / NASA
- COSPAR ID: 1963-013A
- SATCAT no.: 00573
- Mission duration: 2 years, 9 days

Spacecraft properties
- Manufacturer: Bell Telephone Laboratories
- Launch mass: 176.0 kilograms (388.0 lb)

Start of mission
- Launch date: May 7, 1963, 11:38 UTC
- Rocket: Delta B
- Launch site: Cape Canaveral LC-17B

End of mission
- Disposal: Decommissioned
- Deactivated: May 16, 1965, 14:30 UTC

Orbital parameters
- Reference system: Geocentric
- Regime: Medium Earth
- Eccentricity: 0.40048
- Perigee altitude: 974 kilometres (605 mi)
- Apogee altitude: 10,803 kilometres (6,713 mi)
- Inclination: 42.7°
- Period: 225.1 minutes
- Epoch: May 7, 1963

Telstar 2 is a defunct communications satellite launched by NASA on May 7, 1963. It remained active for 2 years. As of 2023 Telstar 2 remains in orbit.

== History ==
Telstar 2, primarily a communications satellite, carried an experiment designed to measure the energetic proton and electron distribution in the Van Allen belts. The spacecraft spin axis shortly after launch was about 80 deg to the ecliptic plane. The initial spin rate was 180 rpm, and it varied slowly over the life of the spacecraft. Telstar 2 was essentially identical to the Telstar 1 satellite. It employed two transmitters, and data were telemetered via a PCM/FM/AM encoder. The telemetry sequence required about 1 min. Telstar 2 differed from Telstar 1 by employing provisions for scientific information to be transmitted in real time via the microwave telemetry system so that telemetry could be obtained after the 2 years timer had turned off the VHF beacon. On May 16, 1965, at 1403 UTC, during the satellite's 4736 orbit, the VHF transmitter was turned off. All systems operated normally until that time.

The satellite was launched into space on May 7, 1963, on a Delta-B rocket from the Cape Canaveral Air Force Station in Florida, United States. The European receiving station for Telstar 2 was built in Brittany, France, near the village of Pleumeur-Bodou, at which the 340-ton pivotally mounted antenna sits under a 50-meter diameter radar dome. These buildings still exist as part of a communications museum. The transmissions were not continuous, being restricted to 25–30 minutes, since the low orbit of the satellite made it difficult for the receiving and transmitting antennas to pick up its signal.

== See also ==
- Telstar
- American Telephone and Telegraph
