= Telstar 9 =

Cancelled 2004 communications satellite

Telstar 9 was a Telstar series geostationary communication satellite that was scheduled to be built by Space Systems/Loral and was planned to be released in 2004, but the construction was eventually canceled.
