= Delta D =

American expendable launch vehicle

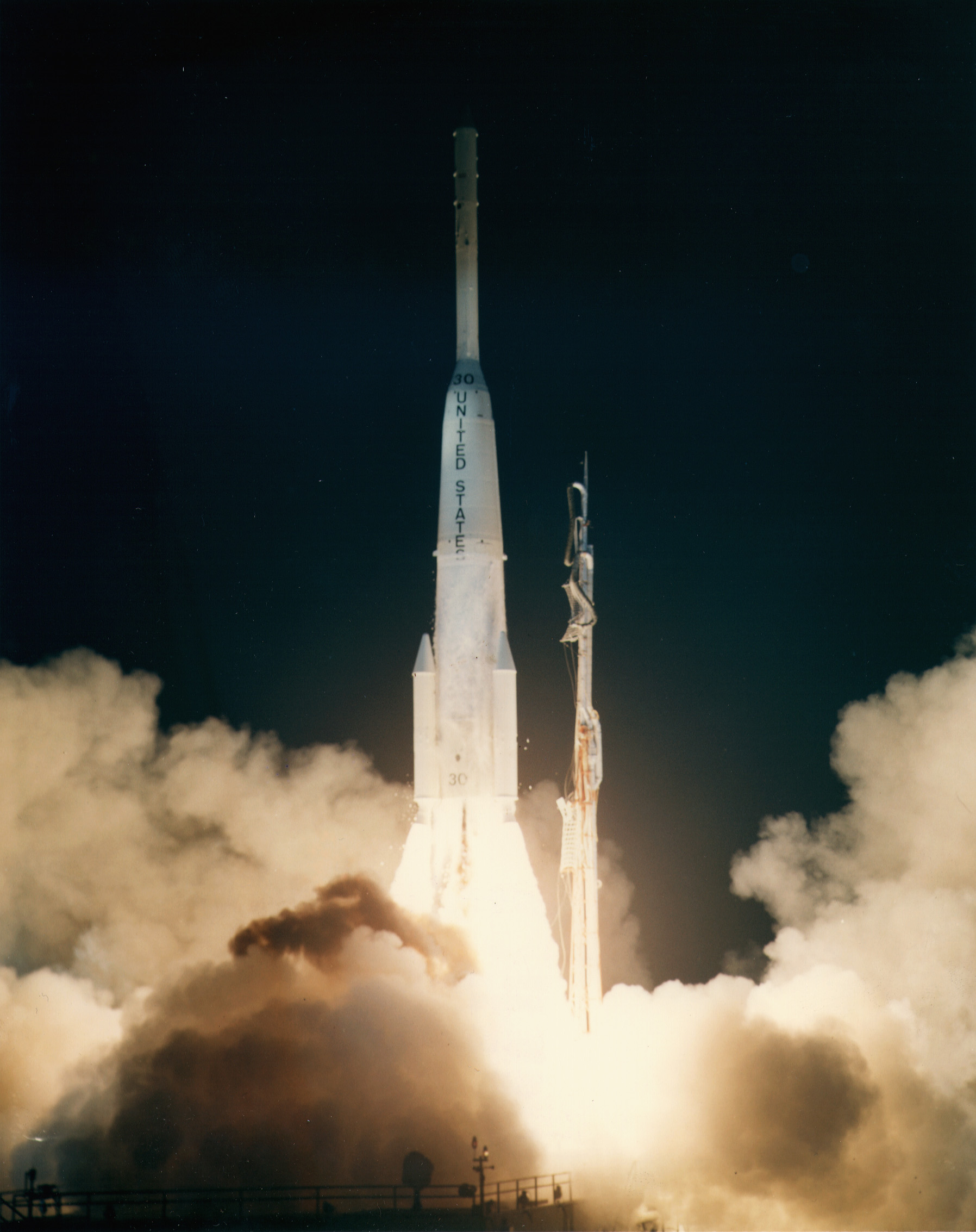
- Launch of a Delta D with Intelsat I
- Function: Expendable launch system
- Country of origin: United States

Launch history
- Status: Retired
- Launch sites: Cape Canaveral LC-17
- Total launches: 2
- Success(es): 2
- First flight: 19 August 1964
- Last flight: 6 April 1965

The Delta D, Thrust Augmented Delta or Thor-Delta D was an American expendable launch system used to launch two communications satellites in 1964 and 1965. It was derived from the Delta C, and was a member of the Delta family of rockets.

The three-stage core vehicle was essentially the same as the Delta C. The first stage was a Thor missile in the DSV-2A configuration, and the second stage was the Delta-D, which was derived from the earlier Delta-A. An Altair-2 SRM was used as a third stage. The main difference between the Delta C and Delta D was the presence of three Castor-1 solid rocket boosters, clustered around the first stage.

Both Delta D launches were conducted from Cape Canaveral Air Force Station Launch Complex 17A. The first, on 19 August 1964, carried Syncom 3, the first satellite in a geostationary orbit. The last, on 6 April 1965, carried the first commercial communications satellite, Intelsat I.
