= Intelsat I =

American commercial communications satellite launched in 1965

Intelsat I F1
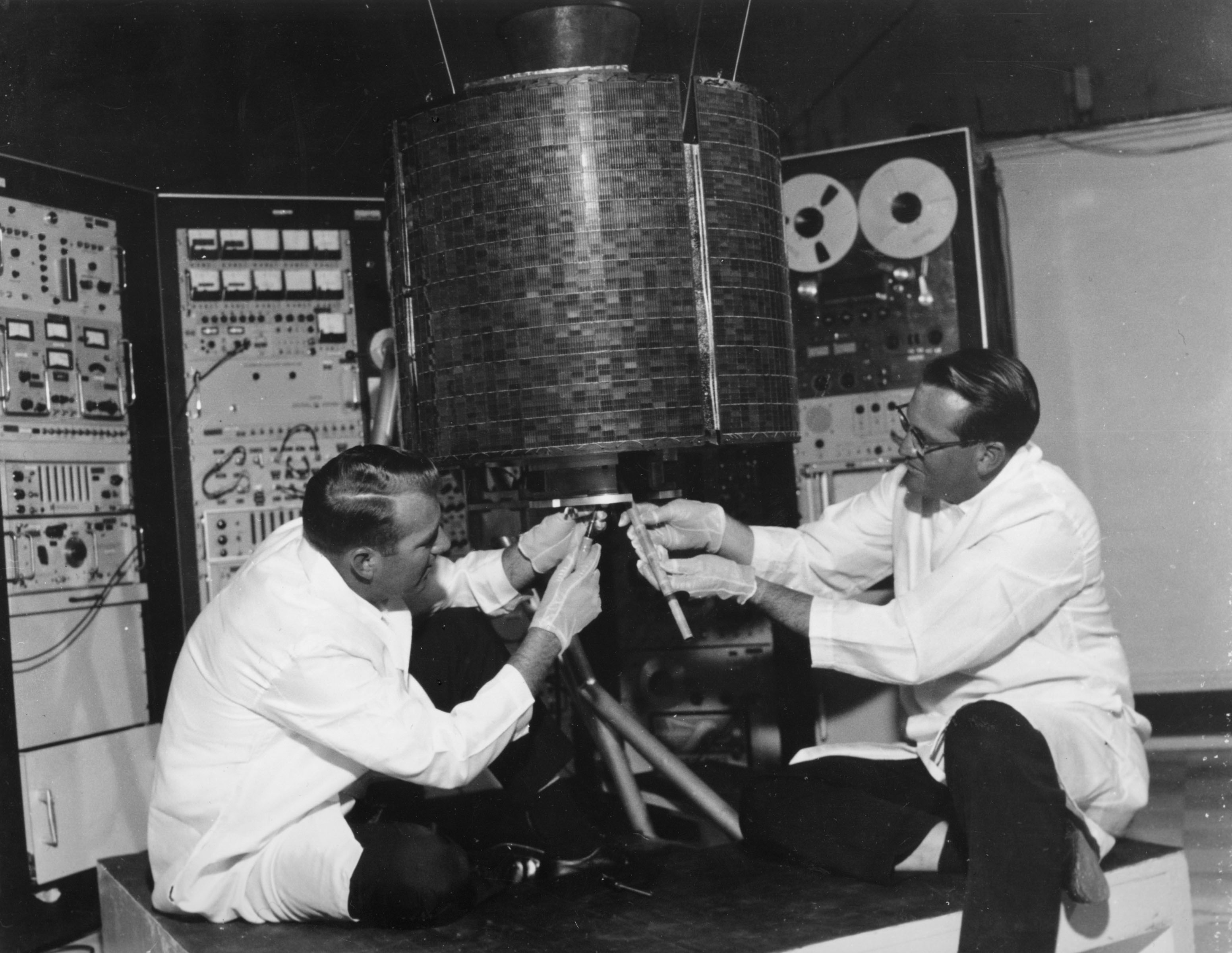
- INTELSAT I Early Bird
- Mission type: Communications
- Operator: Communications Satellite Corporation (COMSAT)
- COSPAR ID: 1965-028A
- SATCAT no.: 01317
- Mission duration: 18 months (planned); 4 years and 4 months

Spacecraft properties
- Bus: HS-303
- Manufacturer: Hughes Aircraft
- Launch mass: 149 kg
- Power: 40 watts

Start of mission
- Launch date: April 6, 1965, 23:47:50 UTC
- Rocket: Delta D
- Launch site: Cape Canaveral, LC-17A
- Contractor: Douglas Aircraft Company
- Entered service: June 28, 1965

End of mission
- Deactivated: August 1969

Orbital parameters
- Reference system: Geocentric
- Regime: GSO
- Perigee altitude: 35,767.8 kilometres (22,225.1 mi)
- Apogee altitude: 35,855.1 kilometres (22,279.3 mi)
- Inclination: 3.1270°
- Period: 1437 minutes
- Revolution no.: 8068

Intelsat I (nicknamed Early Bird for the proverb "The early bird catches the worm") was the first commercial communications satellite to be placed in geosynchronous orbit, on April 6, 1965. It was built by the Space and Communications Group of Hughes Aircraft Company (later Hughes Space and Communications Company, and now Boeing Satellite Systems) for COMSAT, which activated it on June 28, 1965. It was based on the Syncom series of satellites that Hughes had previously built for NASA to demonstrate that communications via synchronous-orbit satellite were feasible. Its booster was a Thrust Augmented Delta (Delta D). After a series of maneuvers, it reached its geosynchronous orbital position over the Atlantic Ocean at 28° West longitude, where it was put into service.

It helped provide the first live TV coverage of a spacecraft splashdown, that of Gemini 6 in December 1965. Originally slated to operate for 18 months, Early Bird was in active service for 4 years and 4 months, being deactivated in January 1969, although it was briefly activated in June of that year to serve the Apollo 11 flight when the Atlantic Intelsat satellite failed. It was deactivated again in August 1969 and has been inactive since that time (except for a brief reactivation in 1990 to commemorate its 25th launch anniversary), although it remains in orbit.

The Early Bird satellite was the first to provide direct and nearly instantaneous contact between Europe and North America, handling television, telephone, and telefacsimile transmissions. It was fairly small, measuring nearly 76 cm × 61 cm (2.5 ft × 2.0 ft) and weighing 34.5 kg (76 lb).

Early Bird was one of the satellites used in the then record-breaking broadcast of Our World.

== Model ==
A full-scale model, or a flight test model, hung in the main lobby of the Intelsat headquarters building, Washington, D.C. before moving to McLean, VA in 2014. It was donated to the National Air and Space Museum in 2022.

== See also ==
- "Early Bird", 1965 song named after Intelsat I
- List of communications satellite firsts
- Syncom, the first geosynchronous and geostationary satellites
