= Explorer S-66 =

NASA satellite of the Explorer program

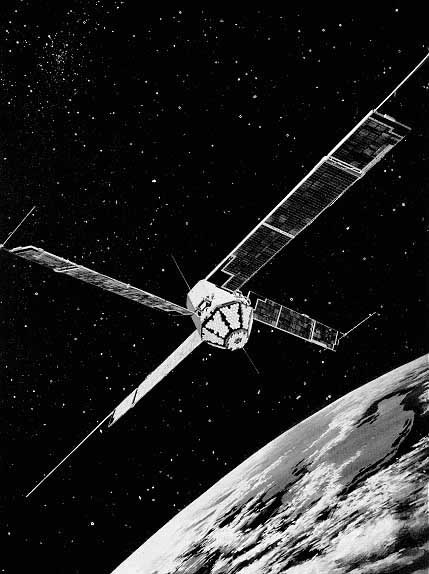
- Explorer S-66 satellite
- Names: BE-A; Beacon Explorer-A; NASA S-66
- Mission type: Ionospheric research
- Operator: NASA
- COSPAR ID: EXS-66A
- Mission duration: Failed to orbit

Spacecraft properties
- Spacecraft: Explorer S-66
- Spacecraft type: Beacon Explorer
- Bus: Transit-Bus
- Manufacturer: Johns Hopkins University; Applied Physics Laboratory
- Launch mass: 120 kg (260 lb)
- Dimensions: 24.5 × 45.7 cm (9.6 × 18.0 in)
- Power: 4 deployable solar arrays and batteries

Start of mission
- Launch date: 19 March 1964, 11:13:41 GMT
- Rocket: Thor-Delta B (Thor 391 / Delta 024)
- Launch site: Cape Canaveral, LC-17A
- Contractor: Douglas Aircraft Company

End of mission
- Destroyed: Failed to orbit

Orbital parameters
- Reference system: Geocentric orbit (planned)
- Regime: Low Earth orbit

Instruments
- Langmuir Probe; Laser Tracking; Radio Frequency Beacon

Explorer S-66 (also called BE-A, acronym of Beacon Explorer-A), was a NASA satellite launched on 19 March 1964 by means of a Thor-Delta B launch vehicle, but it could not reach orbit due to a vehicle launcher failure.

== Spacecraft ==
Beacon Explorer-A was a small ionospheric research satellite instrumented with an electrostatic probe, a 20-, 40-, and 41-Hz ionospheric radio beacon, a passive laser tracking reflector, and a navigation experiment. Its primary objective was to obtain worldwide observations of total electron content between the spacecraft and the Earth. The spacecraft was an octagonal right prism 24.5 × 45.7 cm (9.6 × 18.0 in)-diameter terminated on top with a truncated octagonal pyramid on which the laser reflectors were mounted. Appended were four hinged paddles carrying solar cells. Each paddle was 167.6 × 25.4 cm (66.0 × 10.0 in).

== Launch ==
During the third stage operation, a malfunction of unidentified origin prevented successful orbit. Satellite and third stage descent were in the south Atlantic Ocean with no useful scientific data obtained.

== See also ==
- Explorer program
