= List of communications satellite firsts =

Milestones in the history of communications satellites.

Satellite	First	Launched	Polity
Sputnik 1	First satellite with radio transmitter	October 4, 1957	Soviet Union
Project SCORE	First communications satellite First test of a space communications relay system First (recorded) voice transmission (U.S. President Dwight Eisenhower)	December 18, 1958	United States
TIROS-1	First satellite to transmit television images from space (weather)	April 1, 1960	United States
Echo 1	First passive reflector communications satellite	August 12, 1960	United States
Courier 1B	First active repeater communications satellite First communications satellite powered by solar cells to recharge storage batteries	October 4, 1960	United States
OSCAR 1	First amateur radio satellite First satellite ejected into orbit as a secondary launch payload	December 12, 1961	United States
Telstar 1	First active, direct-relay communications satellite First satellite to relay television, telephone and high-speed data communications First transatlantic television	July 10, 1962	United States
Relay 1	First transpacific television (news of the assassination and funeral procession of U.S. President John F Kennedy); First tandem satellite broadcast (with Syncom 3)	December 13, 1962	United States
Syncom 2	First communications satellite in geosynchronous orbit	July 16, 1963	United States
Syncom 3	First communications satellite in geostationary orbit First Olympic broadcast to international audiences First tandem satellite broadcast (with Relay 1)	August 19, 1964	United States
OSCAR-III	First amateur radio communications satellite (relay/transponder); first OSCAR powered by solar cells	March 9, 1965	United States
Intelsat I	First commercial communications satellite in geosynchronous orbit	April 6, 1965	United States
Orbita	First national TV network based on satellite television	November 1967	Soviet Union
Nimbus 3	First satellite-based search and rescue system First satellite to locate and command remote weather stations to transmit data back to satellite	April 14, 1969	United States
Anik 1	First domestic communications satellite system using geosynchronous orbit (Canada)	November 9, 1972	Canada
ATS-6	First geostationary communications satellite to be three-axis stabilized First experimental Direct Broadcast Satellite; First satellite to provide communications relay services for other spacecraft (Nimbus 6)	May 30, 1974	United States
Symphonie	First geostationary communications satellite with unified propulsion system for station-keeping	December 19, 1974	West Germany; France
AO-6 & AO-7	First satellite-to-satellite communications relay (ground -> AO-7 -> AO-6 -> ground)	January 1975 (occurred)	United States
Ekran	First serial Direct-To-Home TV communication satellite	October 26, 1976	Soviet Union
SBS-3	First commercial use of the U.S. Space Shuttle	November 11, 1982	United States
Tracking and data relay satellite-A	First satellite of first full-time communications relay network for other spacecraft	April 4, 1983	United States
ACTS Gigabit Satellite Network	First communication satellite network to operate in the 20-30 GHz frequency band	September 12, 1993	United States
Iridium 1	First satellite for satellite telephone service	May 5, 1997	United States
AO-40	First satellite to use GPS for navigation and attitude determination in High Earth orbit	November 16, 2000	Germany; United States
Artemis	First demonstration of inter-satellite laser communication	November 21, 2001 (experiment)	European Union
SuitSat	First use of a decommissioned spacesuit as a radio satellite	February 3, 2006 (deployed)	Russia; United States
BRIsat	First satellite owned and operated by a bank	October 18, 2016 (Launch)	Indonesia

== See also ==
- Timeline of first artificial satellites by country
- First images of Earth from space
