= Relay program =

1960s experimental communications satellites

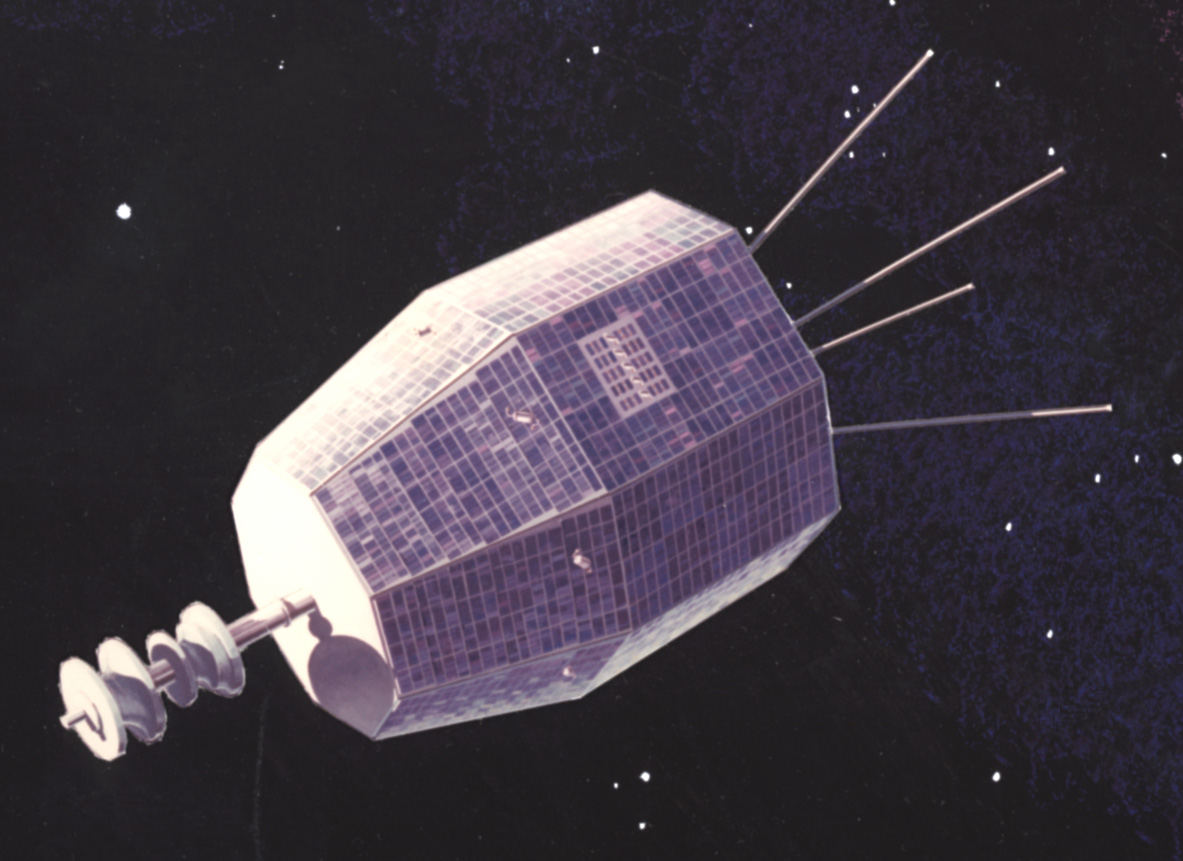
Illustration of a Relay satellite

The Relay program consisted of Relay 1 and Relay 2, two early American satellites in elliptical medium Earth orbit. Both were primarily experimental communications satellites funded by NASA and developed by RCA. As of December 2, 2016, both satellites were still in orbit. Relay 1 provided the first American television transmissions across the Pacific Ocean.

== Relay 1 ==
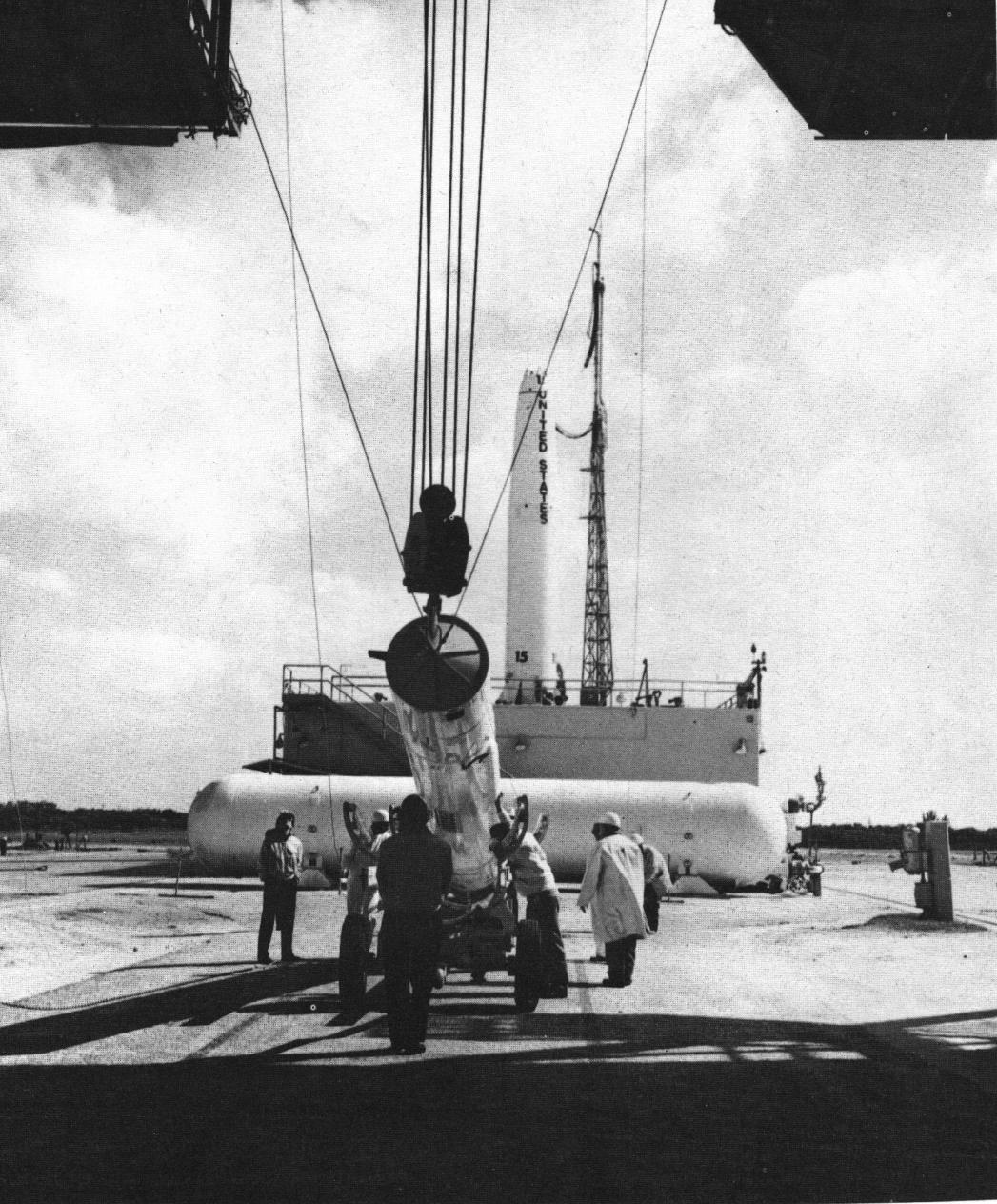
Relay 1 launch: Delta second stage hoisted to mate it with first stage in background

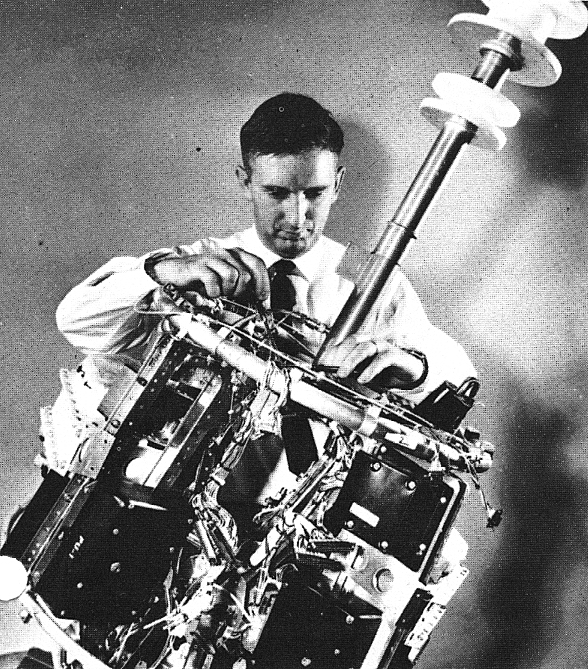
Relay 1 satellite under assembly (1962)

Relay 1 (COSPAR satellite ID: Relay 1 1962-Beta-Upsilon 1 (62BU1)) was launched atop a Delta B rocket (355/D-15) on December 13, 1962, from LC-17A at Cape Canaveral Air Force Station. Its payload included radiation experiments designed to map the Earth's radiation belts.

The spin-stabilized satellite had an initial spin rate of 167.3 rpm and an initial spin axis orientation with a declination of -68.3 deg and a right ascension of -56 deg. Its orbital period was 185.09 minutes, with an apogee of 7500 km and a perigee of 1300 km.

Shortly after launch, two basic problems evolved. One was the satellite's response to spurious commands, and the other was the leakage of a high-power regulator. This leakage caused the first two weeks of satellite operation to be useless. After this period, satellite operation returned to normal. The satellite carried one transmitter for tracking and one for telemetry. The telemetry system was PCM at 1152 bit/s. Each 128 words per telemetry frame (of one second duration) used 113 words for the particle experiment.

Relay 1 was the first satellite to broadcast television from the United States to Japan. The first broadcast during orbit 2677 (1963-11-22, 2027:42-2048 (GMT), or 1:27 pm Dallas time) was to be a prerecorded address from the president of the United States to the Japanese people, but was instead the announcement of the John F. Kennedy assassination. On orbit 2678, this satellite carried a broadcast titled Record, Life of the Late John F. Kennedy, the first television program broadcast simultaneously in the U.S. and Japan. In later orbits, NBC transmitted coverage of the funeral procession from the White House to the cathedral. In the three days following the Kennedy assassination, Relay 1 handled a total of 11 spot broadcasts; eight to Europe and three to Japan. All the useful passes of the satellite were made available to permit immediate coverage of the tragic events.

In August 1964, this satellite was used as the United States-Europe link for the broadcast of the 1964 Summer Olympics from Tokyo, after the signal was relayed to the United States via Syncom 3. This marked the first time that two satellites were used in tandem for a television broadcast.

The leakage problem caused the spacecraft to revert to a low voltage state early in 1965. Sporadic transmission occurred until February 10, 1965, after which no usable scientific data was obtained.

== Relay 2 ==
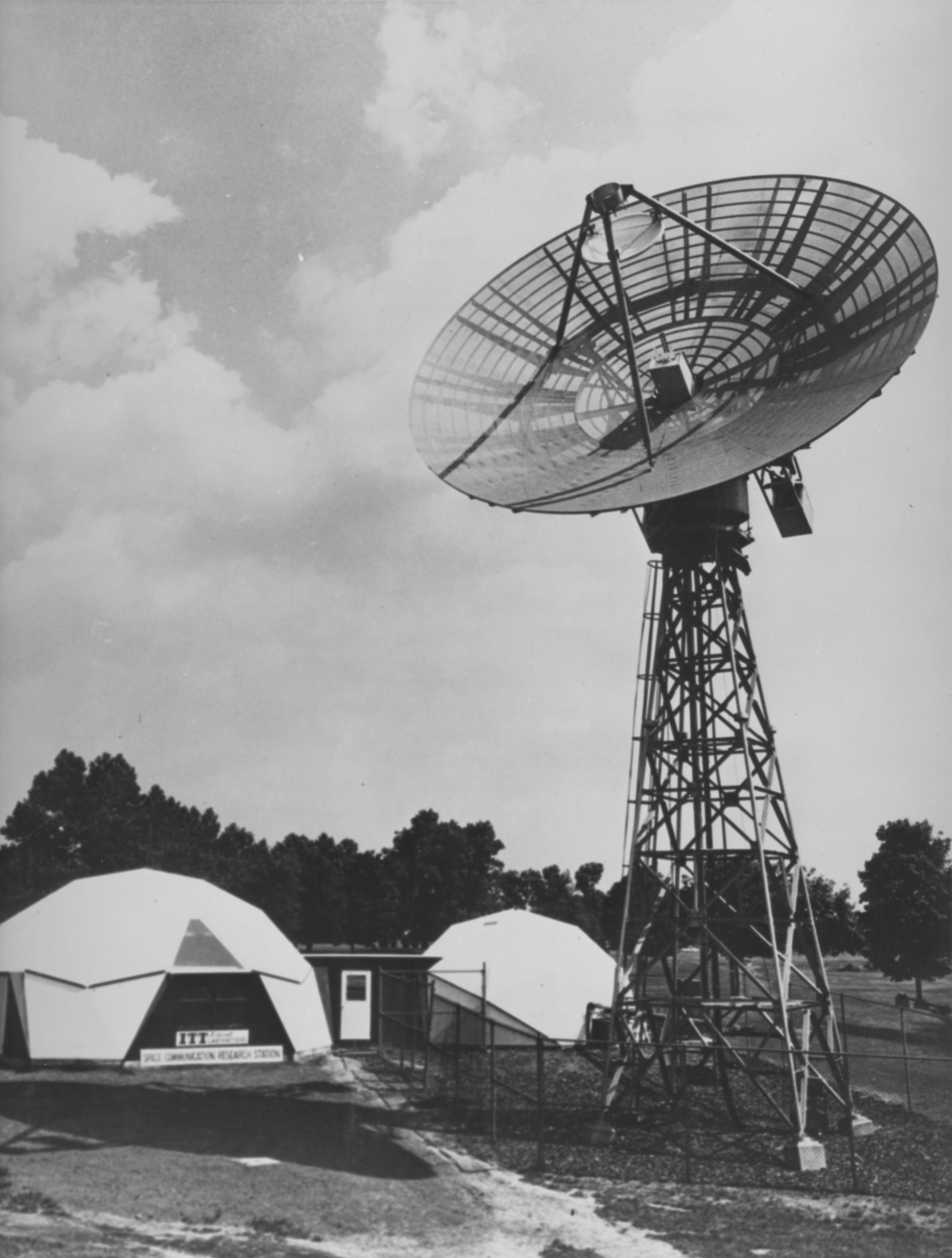
Project Relay ground station

Relay 2 (COSPAR satellite ID: Relay 2 1964-003A) was launched atop a Delta B rocket (373/D-23) on January 21, 1964, from LC-17B at Cape Canaveral Air Force Station. Apogee was 7600 and perigee 1870 km.

It was physically similar to Relay 1. Design changes in this satellite improved its performance so response to spurious commands was essentially eliminated.

NASA ceased operations with Relay 2 on September 26, 1965, with the repurposing of the Mojave Desert Ground Station, the only one in the world equipped to communicate with the satellite, for use with the Applications Technology Satellite program. The final broadcast was of Sen. B. Everett Jordon (D-N.C.) opening the week-long International Exposition of the American Textile Machinery Association in Exposition Hall in Atlantic City.

One of the two onboard transponders operated normally until November 20, 1966. From that time until its failure on January 20, 1967, it required a longer time than normal to come on. The other transponder continued to operate until June 9, 1967, when it too failed to operate normally.

On June 13, 2025, a brief radio signal was detected from Relay 2, which may have been an electrostatic discharge event or a cloud of charged plasma from a collision with a micrometeorite.

== See also ==
- List of communications satellite firsts
- Launch data:
  - 1962 in spaceflight (July–December) (Relay 1)
  - 1964 in spaceflight (January–June) (Relay 2)
- State funeral of John F. Kennedy
