= Telstar 19V =

Canadian commercial communications satellite

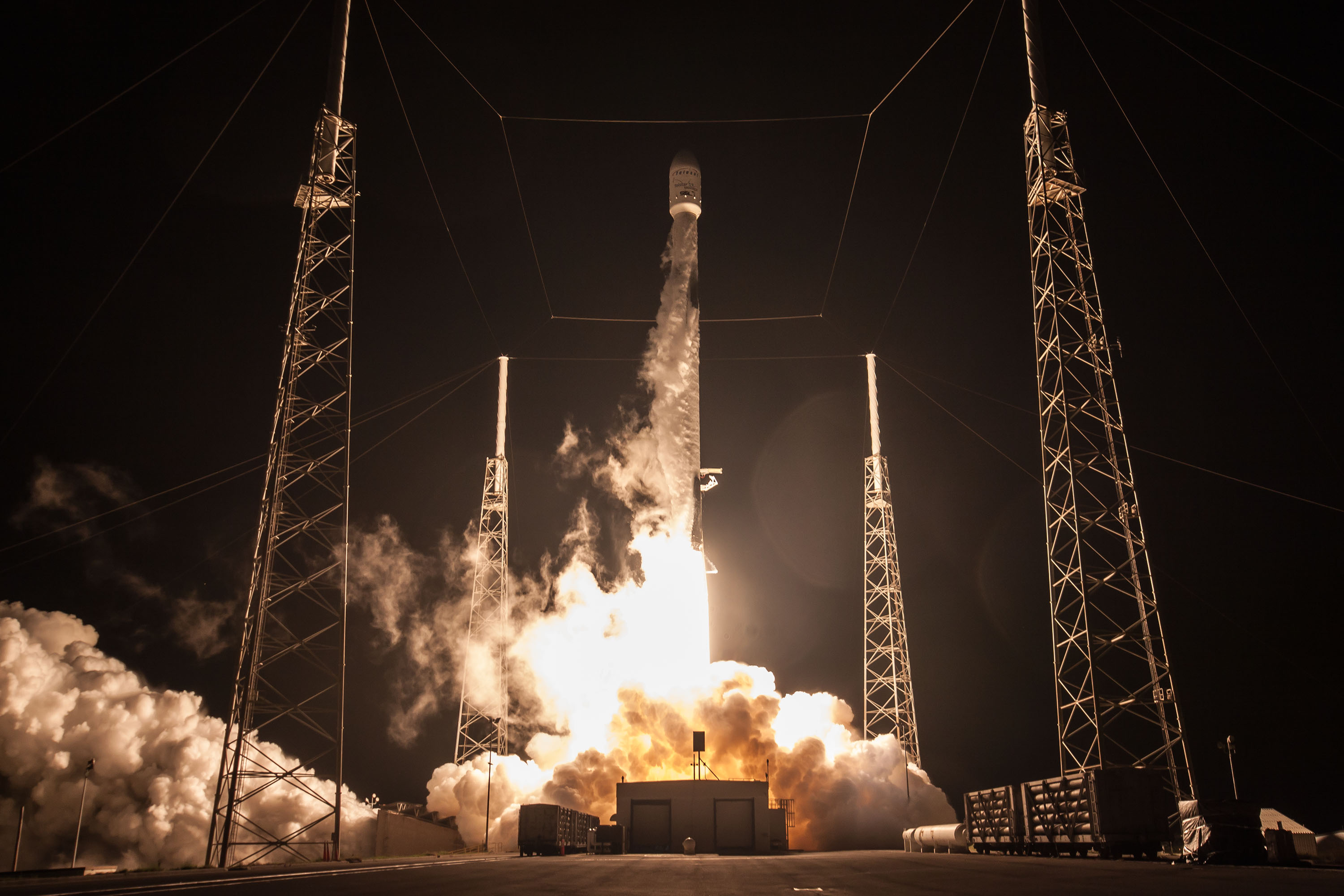
- Telstar 19V Launches aboard a Falcon 9 Block 5
- Mission type: Communication
- Operator: Telesat
- COSPAR ID: 2018-059A
- SATCAT no.: 43562
- Mission duration: 15 years

Spacecraft properties
- Bus: SSL 1300
- Manufacturer: Space Systems Loral
- Launch mass: 7,076 kilograms (15,600 lb)
- Dry mass: 3,031 kilograms (6,682 lb)

Start of mission
- Launch date: 22 July 2018, 05:50 UTC
- Rocket: Falcon 9 Block 5
- Launch site: Cape Canaveral SLC-40
- Contractor: SpaceX

Orbital parameters
- Reference system: Geocentric
- Regime: Geostationary
- Longitude: 63° West
- Semi-major axis: 42,164 kilometers (26,199 mi)
- Eccentricity: 0.0002318
- Perigee altitude: 35,784.1 kilometers (22,235.2 mi)
- Apogee altitude: 35,803.6 kilometers (22,247.3 mi)
- Inclination: 0.0324°
- Period: 1,436.1 minutes
- Epoch: September 4, 2018

Telstar 19V (Telstar 19 Vantage) is a communication satellite in the Telstar series of the Canadian satellite communications company Telesat. It was built by Space Systems Loral (MAXAR) and is based on the SSL-1300 bus. The satellite was designed to provide additional capacity over the North Atlantic region. As of 26 July 2018, Telstar 19V is the heaviest commercial communications satellite ever launched, weighing at 7,076 kg (15,600 lbs) and surpassing the previous record, set by TerreStar-1 (6,910 kg/15230lbs), launched by Ariane 5ECA on 1 July 2009.

== Launch ==
Telstar 19V was launched on a SpaceX Falcon 9 Block 5 rocket into geostationary transfer orbit (GTO) from Space Launch Complex 40 (SLC40) at Cape Canaveral Air Force Station, Space Coast, Florida, United States, on 22 July 2018 at 1:50 AM EDT (5:50 UTC). The rocket core landed on the autonomous spaceport drone ship about eight and a half minutes after liftoff.
