= Delta B =

Retired American expendable rocket

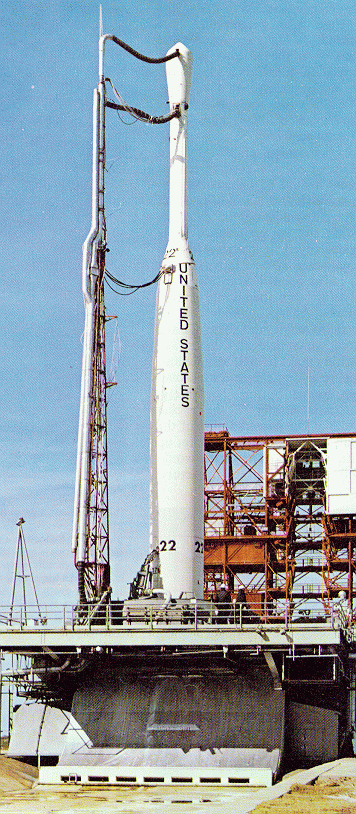
- Delta B prior to the launch of TIROS-8
- Function: Expendable launch system
- Country of origin: United States

Capacity

Payload to LEO
- Altitude: 350 nautical miles (650 km; 400 mi)
- Mass: 800 pounds (360 kg)

Payload to Earth escape trajectory
- Mass: 130 pounds (59 kg)

Launch history
- Status: Retired
- Launch sites: Cape Canaveral LC-17
- Total launches: 9
- Success(es): 8
- Failure(s): 1
- First flight: 13 December 1962
- Last flight: 19 March 1964

The Delta B, or Thor-Delta B was an American expendable launch system used for nine orbital launches between 1962 and 1964. A derivative of the Thor-Delta, it was a member of the Delta family of rockets.

The first stage was a Thor missile in the DM-21 configuration, and the second stage was the AJ10-118, which was derived from the earlier Delta-A. An Altair solid rocket motor was used as a third stage.

All nine launches occurred from Cape Canaveral Air Force Station Launch Complex 17. Most of the launches carried communications satellites, including Syncom-1 and Syncom-2. Syncom-1 was intended to be the first satellite to be placed into a geosynchronous orbit, however the spacecraft malfunctioned prior to reaching this orbit. Syncom-2 subsequently became the first geosynchronous satellite, and was placed at 55° west of the Greenwich Meridian. The final launch failed due to third stage underperformance, all other launches were successful.

== Delta B launches ==
Delta B was launched nine times:

Date	Ser.	Launch site	Payload
13.12.1962	Thor 355 Delta 15	LC-17A	Relay 1
14.02.1963	Thor 358 Delta 16	LC-17B	Syncom 1
03.04.1963	Thor 357 Delta 17	LC-17B	Explorer 17
07.05.1963	Thor 366 Delta 18	LC-17B	Telstar 2
19.06.1963	Thor 359 Delta 19	LC-17B	TIROS 7
26.07.1963	Thor 370 Delta 20	LC-17A	Syncom 2
21.12.1963	Thor 371 Delta 22	LC-17B	TIROS 8
21.01.1964	Thor 373 Delta 23	LC-17B	Relay 2
19.03.1964	Thor 391 Delta 24	LC-17A	Explorer S-66 (failed)
