= Telstar 12V =

Canadian commercial communications satellite

- Mission type: Communications
- Operator: Telesat
- COSPAR ID: 2015-068A
- SATCAT no.: 41036
- Mission duration: 15 years

Spacecraft properties
- Bus: Eurostar E3000
- Manufacturer: Airbus Defence and Space
- Launch mass: 4,800 kilograms (10,600 lb)

Start of mission
- Launch date: 24 November 2015
- Rocket: H-IIA 204
- Launch site: Tanegashima Yoshinobu 1
- Contractor: Mitsubishi

Telstar 12V (Telstar 12 Vantage) is a communication satellite in the Telstar series of the Canadian satellite communications company Telesat. The satellite was the first dedicated commercial payload of the Japanese H-IIA launch vehicle.
