= Syncom =

1960s and 80s NASA program to develop communications satellites

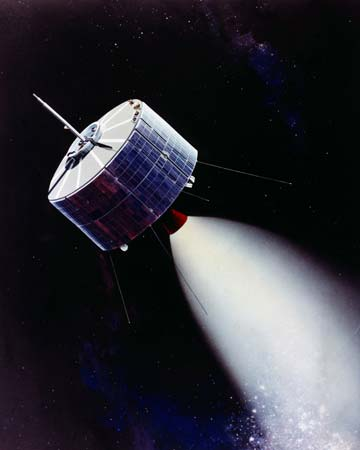
Artist's vision of Syncom satellite, 1963

Syncom (for "synchronous communication satellite") started as a 1961 NASA program for active geosynchronous communication satellites, all of which were developed and manufactured by the Space and Communications division of Hughes Aircraft Company (now the Boeing Satellite Development Center). Syncom 2, launched in 1963, was the world's first geosynchronous communications satellite. Syncom 3, launched in 1964, was the world's first geostationary satellite.

In the 1980s, the series was continued as Syncom IV with some much larger satellites, also manufactured by Hughes. They were leased to the United States military under the Leasat program.

== Syncom 1, 2 and 3 ==
=== Common features ===
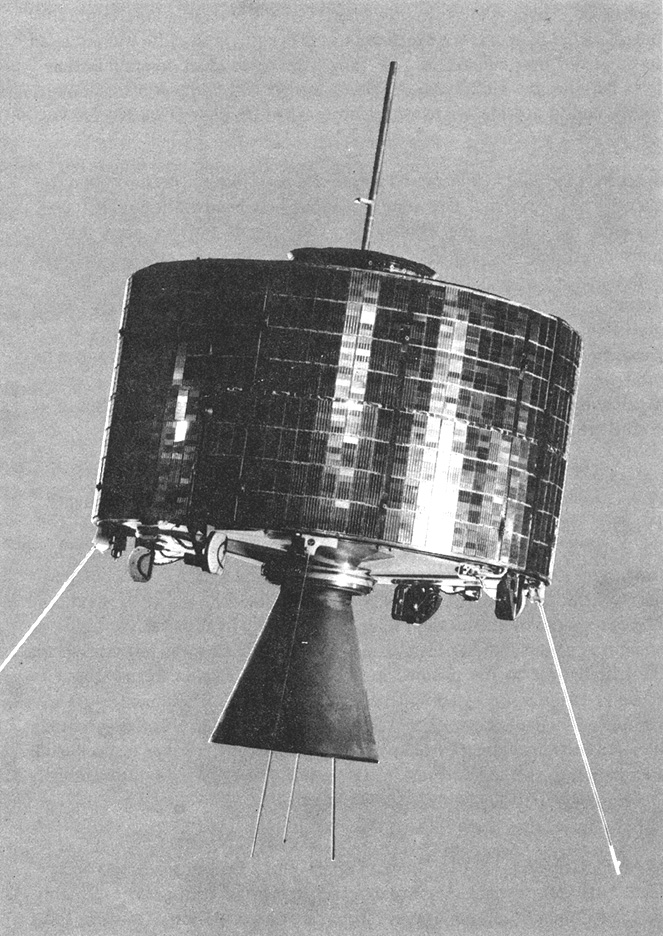
First generation Syncom satellite

The three early Syncom satellites were experimental spacecraft built by Hughes Aircraft Company's facility in Culver City, California, by a team led by Harold Rosen, Don Williams, and Thomas Hudspeth. All three satellites were cylindrical in shape, with a diameter of about 71 centimetres (28 in) and a height of about 39 centimetres (15 in). Pre-launch fueled masses were 68 kilograms (150 lb), and orbital masses were 39 kilograms (86 lb) with a 25-kilogram (55 lb) payload. They were capable of emitting signals on two transponders at just 2 W. Thus, Syncom satellites were only capable of carrying a single two-way telephone conversation, or 16 Teletype connections. As of 25 June 2009, all three satellites are still in orbit, although no longer functioning.

=== Syncom 1 ===
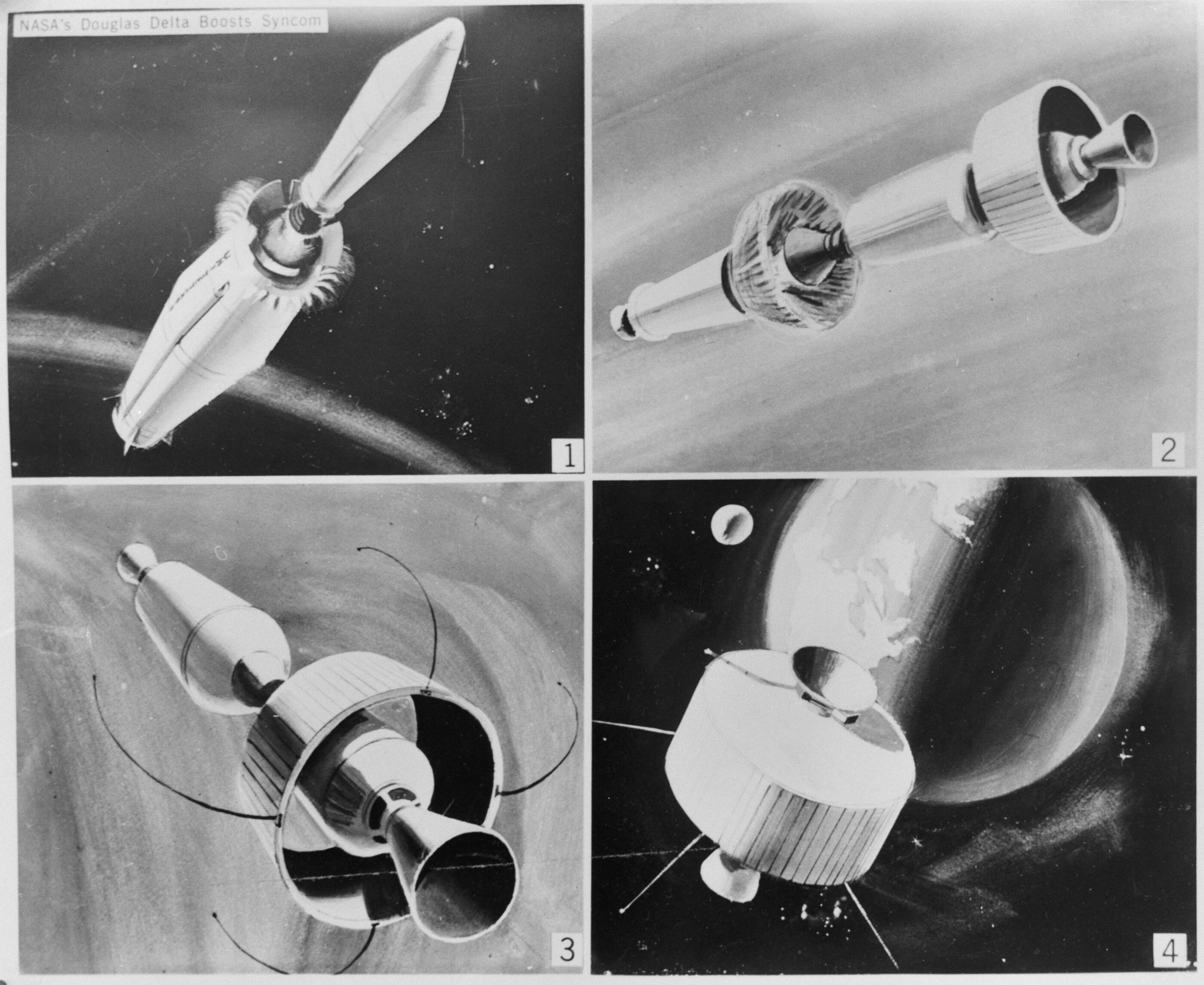
Syncom launch sequence

Syncom 1 was intended to be the first geosynchronous communications satellite. It was launched on February 14, 1963, with the Delta B #16 launch vehicle from Cape Canaveral, but was lost on the way to geosynchronous orbit due to an electronics failure. Seconds after the apogee kick motor for circularizing the orbit was fired, the spacecraft fell silent. Later telescopic observations verified the satellite was in an orbit with a period of almost 24 hours at a 33° inclination.

=== Syncom 2 ===
Syncom 2 was launched by NASA on July 26, 1963 with the Delta B #20 launch vehicle from Cape Canaveral. The satellite successfully kept station at the altitude calculated by Herman Potočnik Noordung in the 1920s.

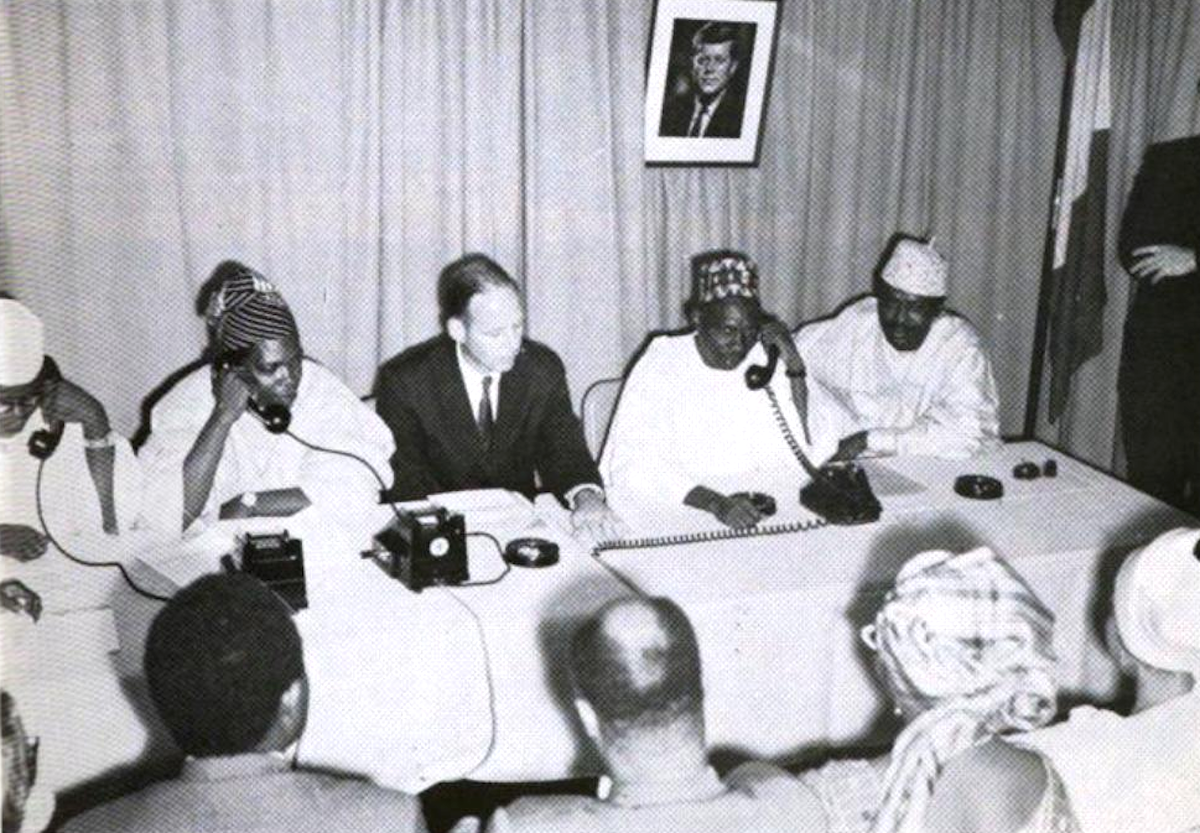
Prime Minister Balewa (2nd from right) talks to President John F. Kennedy on the first live broadcast via the Syncom 2 satellite from USNS Kingsport in Lagos, Nigeria.

During the first year of Syncom 2 operations, NASA conducted voice, teletype, and facsimile tests, as well as 110 public demonstrations to show the capabilities of this satellite and invite feedback. In August 1963, President John F. Kennedy in Washington, D.C., telephoned Nigerian Prime Minister Abubakar Tafawa Balewa aboard USNS Kingsport (the first satellite communication ship) docked in Lagos Harbor—the first live two-way call between heads of government by satellite. The Kingsport acted as a control station and uplink station.

Syncom 2 also relayed a number of test television transmissions from Fort Dix, New Jersey to a ground station in Andover, Maine, beginning on September 29, 1963. Although it was low-quality video with no audio, it was the first successful television transmission through a geosynchronous satellite.

=== Syncom 3 ===
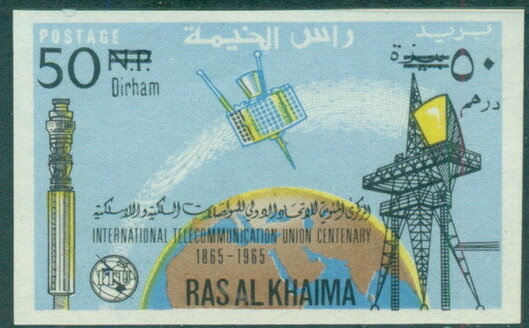
Stamp showing Syncom 3

Syncom 3 was the first geostationary communication satellite, launched on August 19, 1964, with the Delta D #25 launch vehicle from Cape Canaveral. The satellite, in orbit near the International Date Line, had the addition of a wideband channel for television and was used to telecast the 1964 Summer Olympics in Tokyo to the United States. Although Syncom 3 is sometimes credited with the first television program to cross the Pacific Ocean, the Relay 1 satellite first broadcast television from the United States to Japan on November 22, 1963.

=== Transfer to Department of Defense control ===
By the end of 1964, Syncoms 2 and 3 had completed NASA's R&D experiments. On January 1, 1965, NASA transferred operation of the satellites to the United States Department of Defense (DOD) along with telemetry, command stations, and range and rangefinding equipment. DOD had, in fact, provided the communications ground stations used to relay transmissions via the two Syncoms since their launch. DOD agreed to provide telemetry and ranging data of continuing scientific and engineering interest.

In 1965, Syncom 3 was implemented to support the DOD's communications in Vietnam.

Turned off in 1969, Syncom 3 remains in geosynchronous orbit as of 2024. In 50 years it has drifted east, to longitude 123 W.

== Syncom IV (Leasat) ==
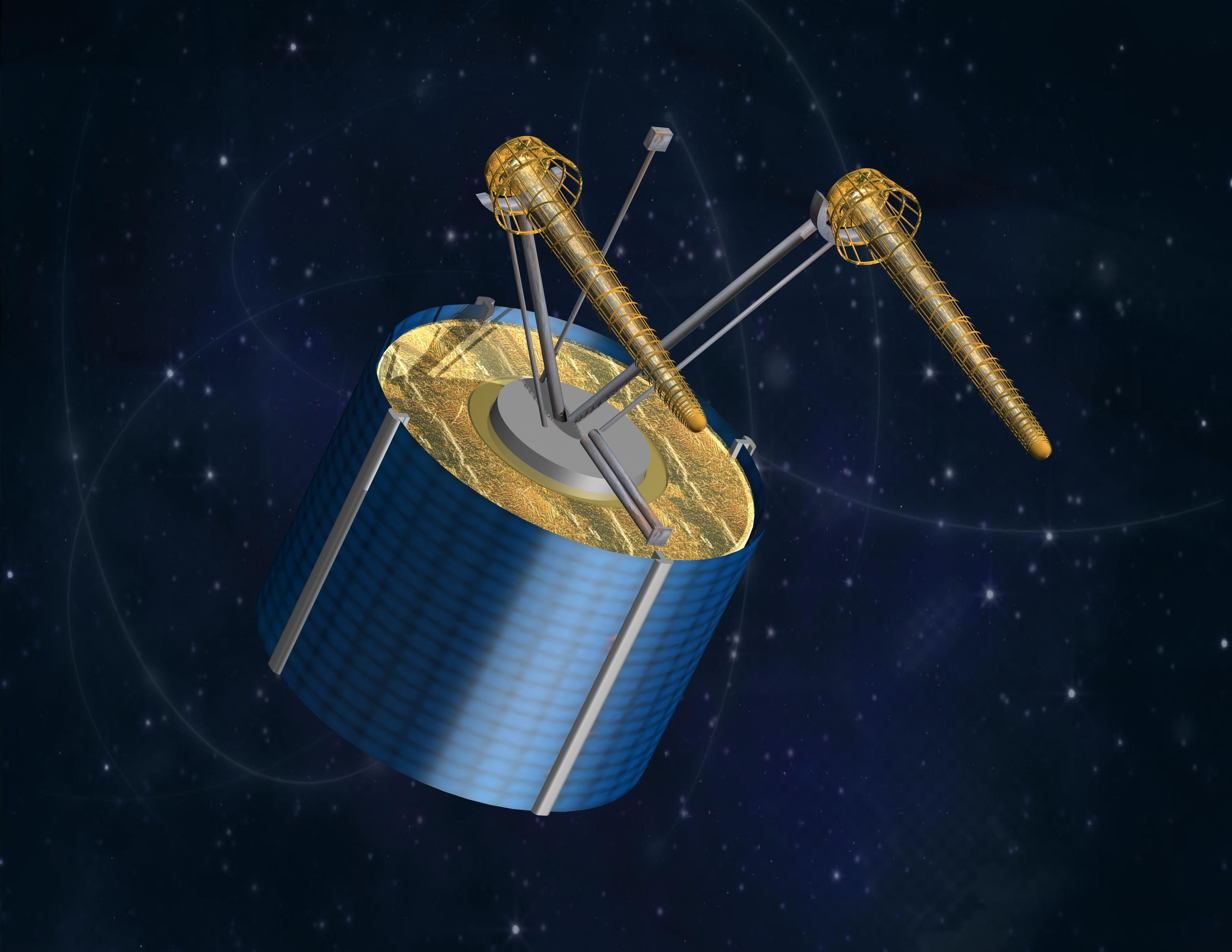
Leasat (Syncom IV) satellite

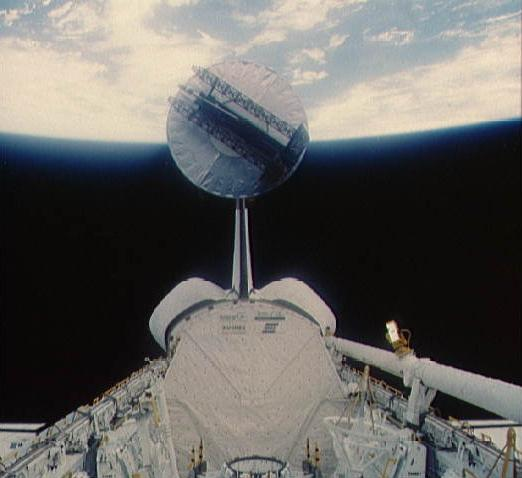
Leasat F1 satellite after deployment from STS-51-A

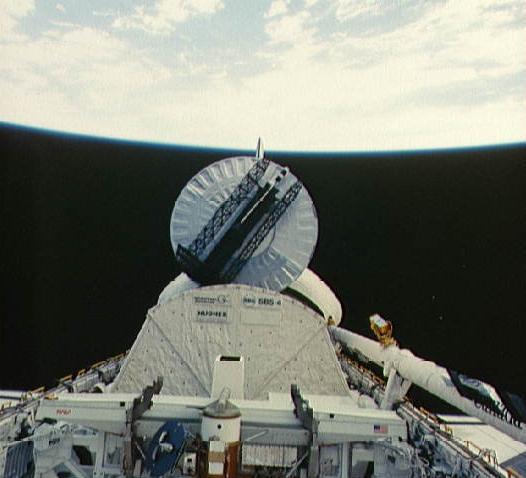
Leasat F2 satellite after deployment from STS-41-D

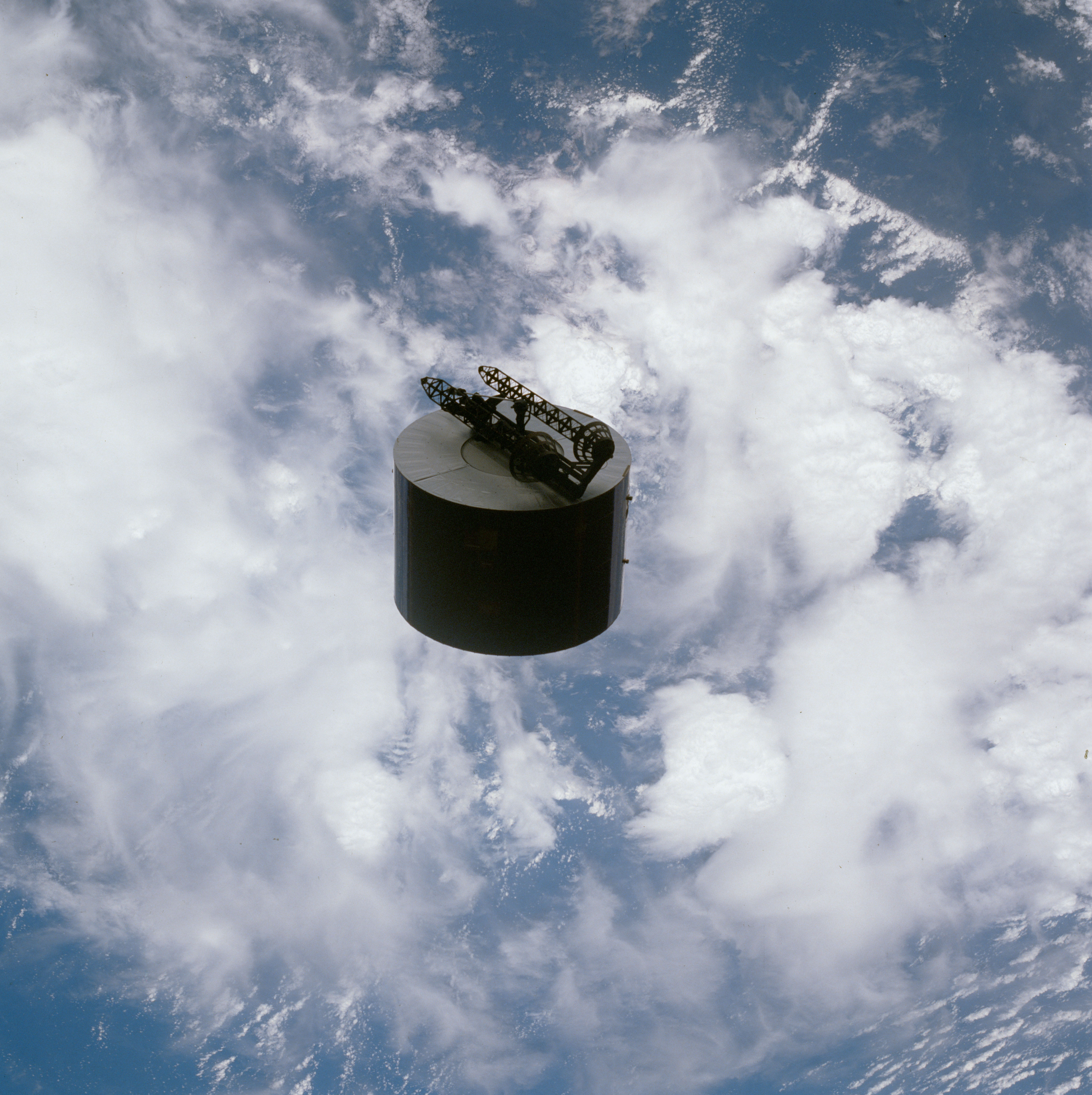
Leasat F3 after its deployment from the shuttle Discovery during mission STS-51-D

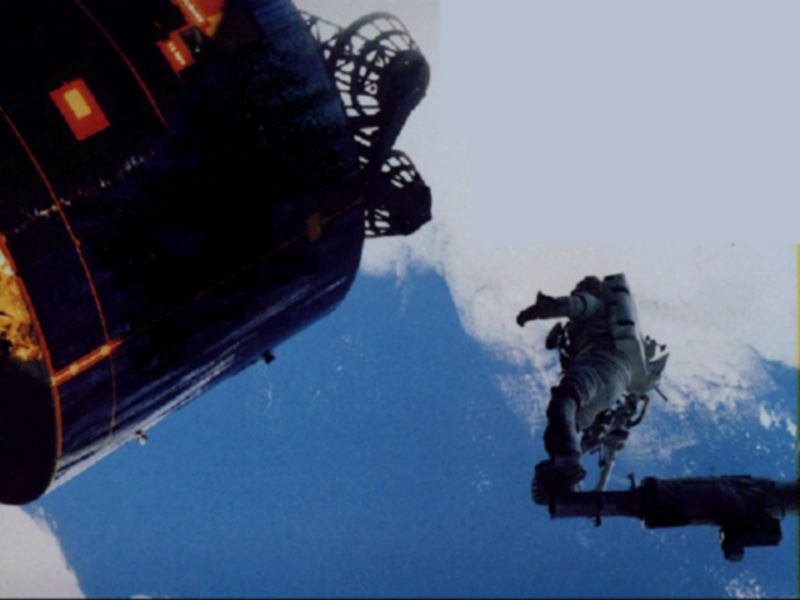
Astronaut James van Hoften manipulating Leasat F3 satellite during STS-51-I

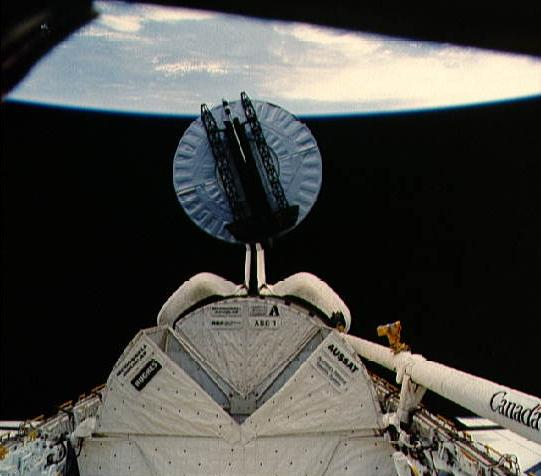
Leasat F4 deployed from the payload bay of the Shuttle Discovery on STS-51-I

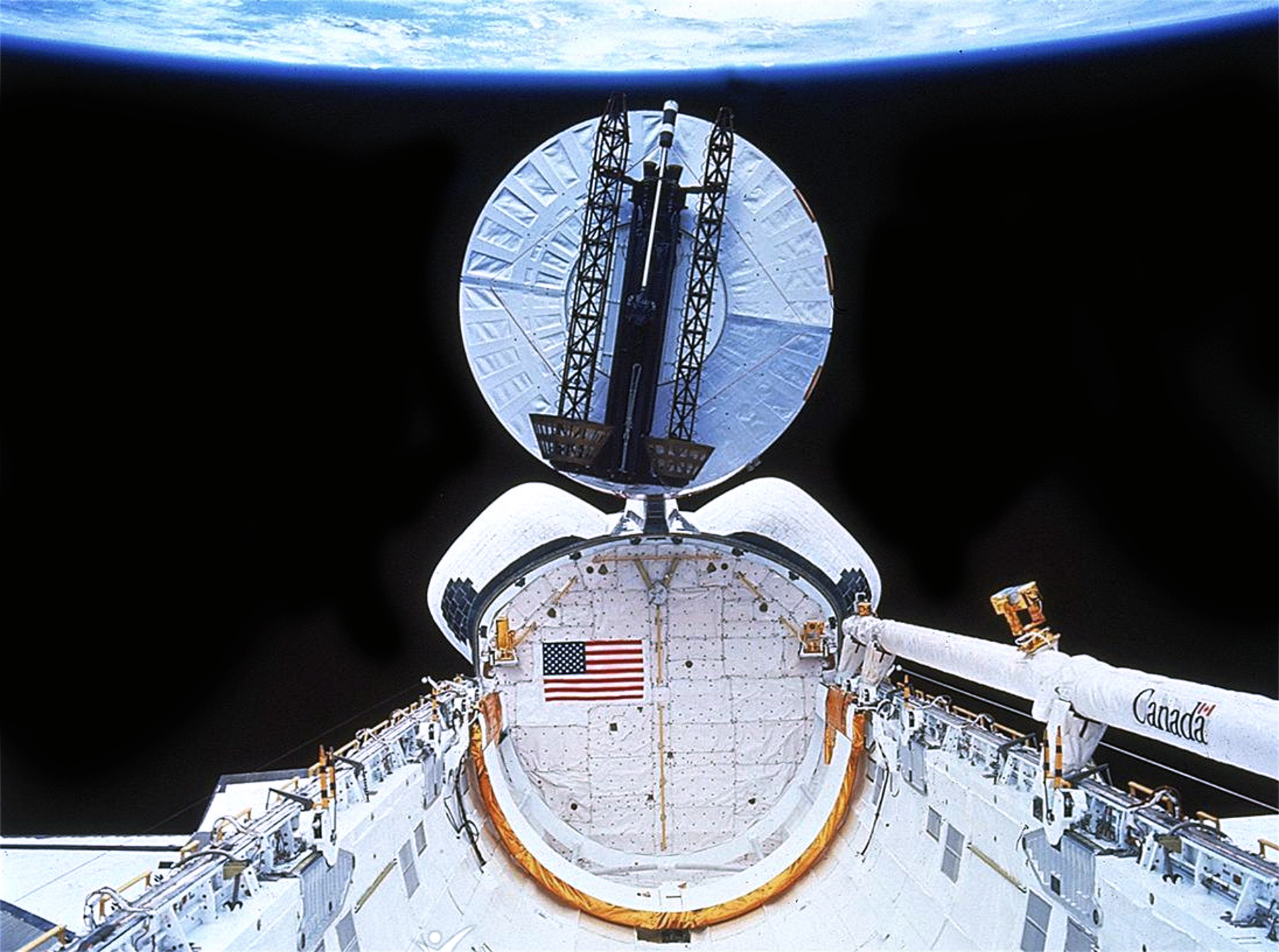
Leasat F4 released "frisbee-style" from the payload bay of Columbia on mission STS-32

The five satellites of the 1980s Leasat (Leased Satellite) program (Leasat F1 through Leasat F5) were alternatively named Syncom IV-1 to Syncom IV-5, all using Hughes' HS-381 platform of satellite. These satellites were considerably larger than Syncoms 1 to 3, weighing 1.3 tonnes each (over 7 tonnes with launch fuel). At 4.26 metres (14.0 ft), the satellites were the first to be designed for launch from the Space Shuttle payload bay, and were deployed like a Frisbee. The satellites are 30 rpm spin-stabilized with a despun communications and antenna section. They were made with a solid rocket motor for initial perigee burn and hydrazine propellant for station keeping and spin stabilization. The communications systems offers a wideband UHF channel (500 kHz bandwidth), six relay 25 kHz channels, and five narrowband 5 kHz channels. This is in addition to the fleet broadcast frequency, which is in the military's X-band. The system was used by military customers in the US and later in Australia. Most of the satellites were retired in the 1990s, but one would remain operational until 2015. During the First Gulf War, Leasat would be used for personal communications between Secretary of State James Baker and President George H. W. Bush, but was more typically used by "mobile air, surface, subsurface, and fixed earth stations of the Navy, Marine Corps, Air Force, and Army."

Hughes was contracted to provide a worldwide communications system based on four satellites, one over the continental United States (CONUS), and one each over the Atlantic, Pacific, and Indian oceans, spaced about 90 degrees apart. Five satellites were ordered, with one as a replacement. Also part of the contract were the associated control systems and ground stations. The lease contracts were typically for five-year terms, with the lessee having the opportunity to extend the lease or to purchase the equipment outright. The US Navy was the original lessee.

Leasat F1's launch was canceled just prior to lift-off, and F2 became the first into orbit on August 30, 1984, aboard Space Shuttle Discovery on shuttle mission STS-41-D. F2 was largely successful, but its wideband receiver was out of commission after only four months. F1 was launched successfully on November 8, 1984, aboard STS-51-A. This was followed on April 12, 1985, by Leasat F3 on STS-51-D. F3's launch was declared a failure when the satellite failed to start its maneuver to geostationary orbit once released from Discovery. Attempts by Shuttle astronauts to activate F3 with a makeshift "flyswatter" were unsuccessful. The satellite was left in low Earth orbit, and the Space Shuttle returned to Earth. This failure made front-page news in The New York Times. Hughes had an insurance policy on the satellite, and so claimed a total loss for the spacecraft of about $200 million, an amount underwritten by numerous parties.

However, with another satellite planned to be launched, it was determined that a space walk by a subsequent Shuttle crew might be able to "wake" the craft. The best guess was that a switch had failed to turn on the satellite. A "bypass box" was hastily constructed, NASA was excited to offer assistance, the customer was supportive, and the insurance underwriters agreed to fund the first ever attempt at space salvage.

On August 27, 1985 Discovery was again used to launch Leasat F4, and during the same mission (STS-51-I) captured the 15,000 lb stricken F3. Astronaut James van Hoften grappled and then manually spun down the F3 satellite. After the bypass box was installed by van Hoften and Bill Fisher, van Hoften manually spun the satellite up. Once released, the F3 successfully powered up, fired its perigee motor and obtained a geostationary orbit. (This scenario would play out again in 1992 with Intelsat 603 and Space Shuttle Endeavour.) While F3 was now operational, Leasat F4 soon failed and was itself declared a loss after only 40 hours of RF communications.

The stricken F4 did not remain a complete failure. Data from F4's failure permitted the saving of F1 from a premature failure. Since all of the Leasats are spin-stabilized, they have a bearing that connects the non-rotating and rotating parts of the spacecraft. After F4's communication failure, it suffered a spin lock while attempting to jostle the communications payload: the spun and despun sections locked together. Remembering this second failure of F4, and with F1 beginning to wear out at the spin bearing, it was decided to "flip" F1 every six months to keep the payload in the sun. Thus F1 went on to operate smoothly for its remaining life and never encountered a locked despun section.

Leasat F4 was subsequently powered down and moved to a graveyard orbit with a large amount of station keeping fuel in reserve. This was fortuitous; when another satellite suffered a loss of its fuel ten years later, Hughes engineers pioneered the use of alternative propellants with Leasat F4. Long after its primary mission had failed, F4 was powered back on to test whether a satellite could be kept on station using nonvolatile propellants. F4 was used to perform numerous tests, including maneuvers with oxidizer for propulsion once the hydrazine ran out.

The fifth and last Leasat (F5), which was built as a spare, was successfully launched by Space Shuttle Columbia mission STS-32 on January 9, 1990. The last active Leasat, it was officially decommissioned on September 24, 2015, at 18:25:13 UTC. F5 was one of the longest-serving and most successful commercial satellites. Towards the end of its 25-year life, F5 had been leased by the Australian Defence Force for UHF service.

Syncom / Leasat satellites
Date	Name	ID	Launch vehicle
1963-02-14	Syncom 1	1963-004A	Thor Delta B
1963-07-26	Syncom 2	1963-031A	Thor Delta B
1964-08-19	Syncom 3	1964-047A	Thor Delta D
1984-11-10	Syncom IV Leasat F1	1984-093C	Space Shuttle Discovery, STS-51-A
1984-08-31	Syncom IV Leasat F2	1984-113C	Space Shuttle Discovery, STS-41-D
1985-04-12	Syncom IV Leasat F3	1985-028C	Space Shuttle Discovery, STS-51-D
1985-08-29	Syncom IV Leasat F4	1985-076D	Space Shuttle Discovery, STS-51-I
1990-01-09	Syncom IV Leasat F5	1990-002B	Space Shuttle Columbia, STS-32

== See also ==
- List of communications satellite firsts
- ATS-1 – Early geostationary communications and weather satellite, launched in 1966
- John H. Rubel – United States Department of Defense official (1920–2015)
