= Nimiq =

Canadian fleet of communication satellites

The Nimiq satellites are a Canadian fleet of geostationary telecommunications satellites owned by Telesat and used by satellite television providers including Bell Satellite TV and EchoStar (Dish Network). 'Nimiq' is an Inuit word used for an object or a force which binds things together. A contest in 1998 was held to choose the name of these satellites. The contest drew over 36,000 entries. Sheila Rogers, a physiotherapist from Nepean, Ontario, submitted the winning name.

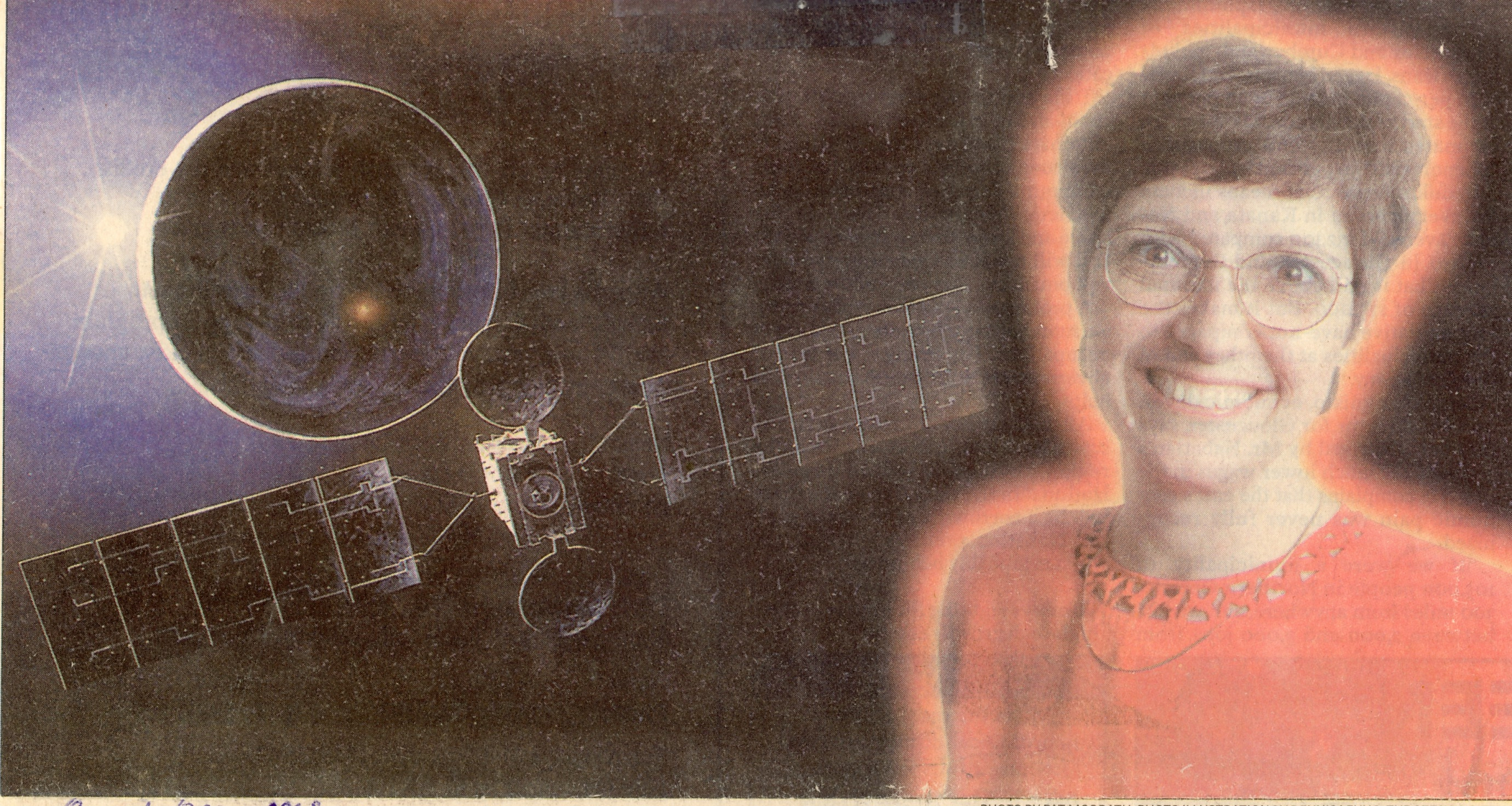
Sheila Rogers - Winner of satellite naming contest

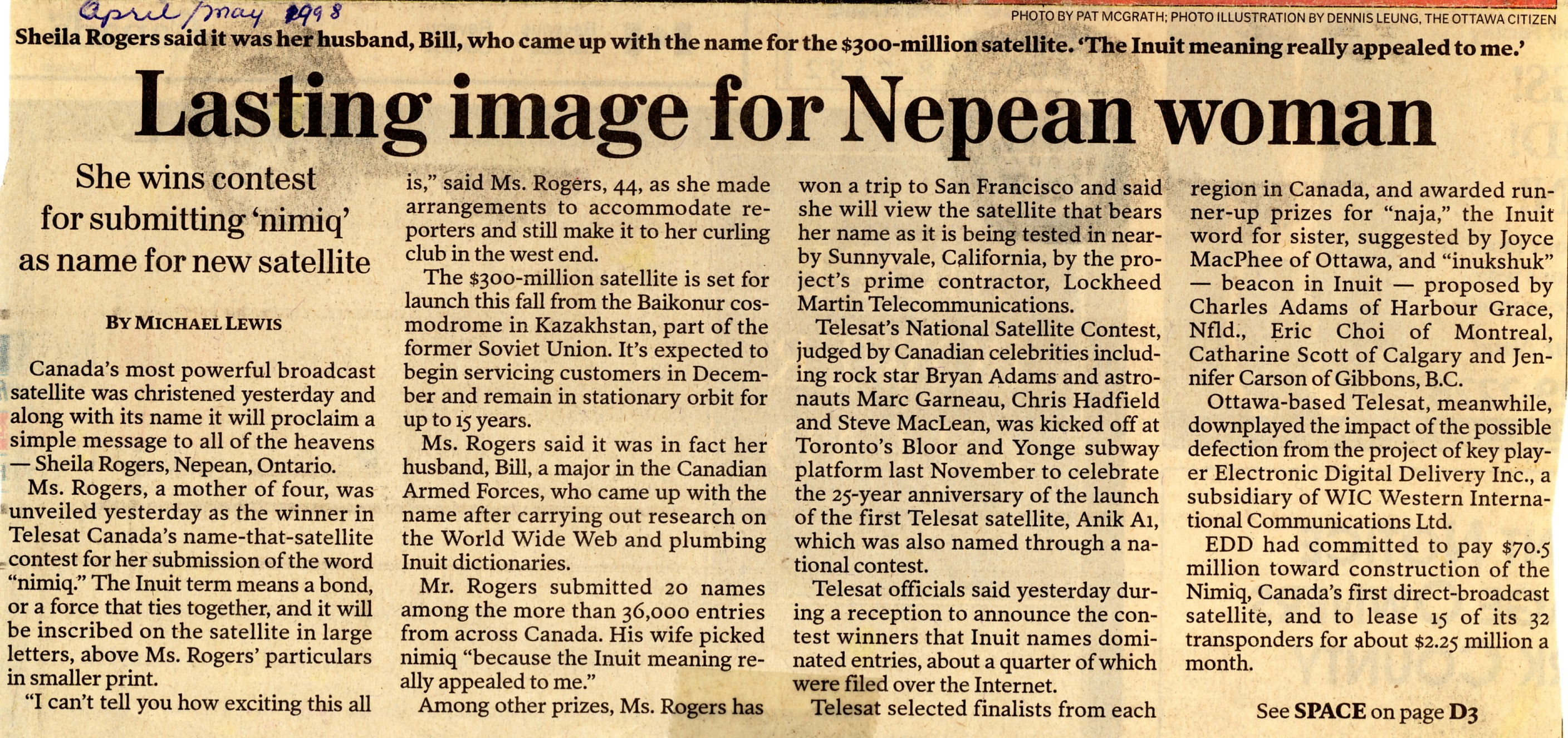
Lasting image for Nepean woman - Sheila Rogers wins contest for submitting 'nimiq' as name for new satellite.

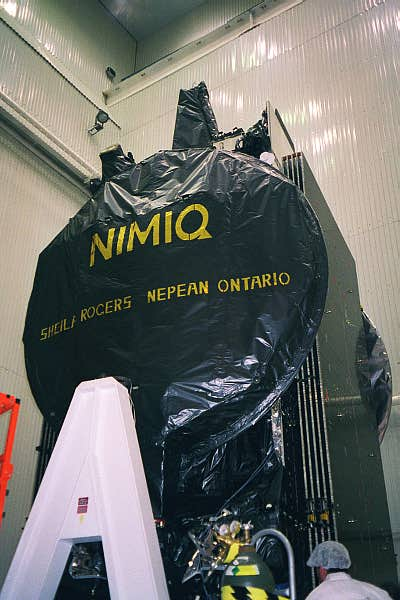
Nimiq satellite - Rogers got an honour that's truly unique: her own name placed on the satellite, immediately below the name of the satellite itself.

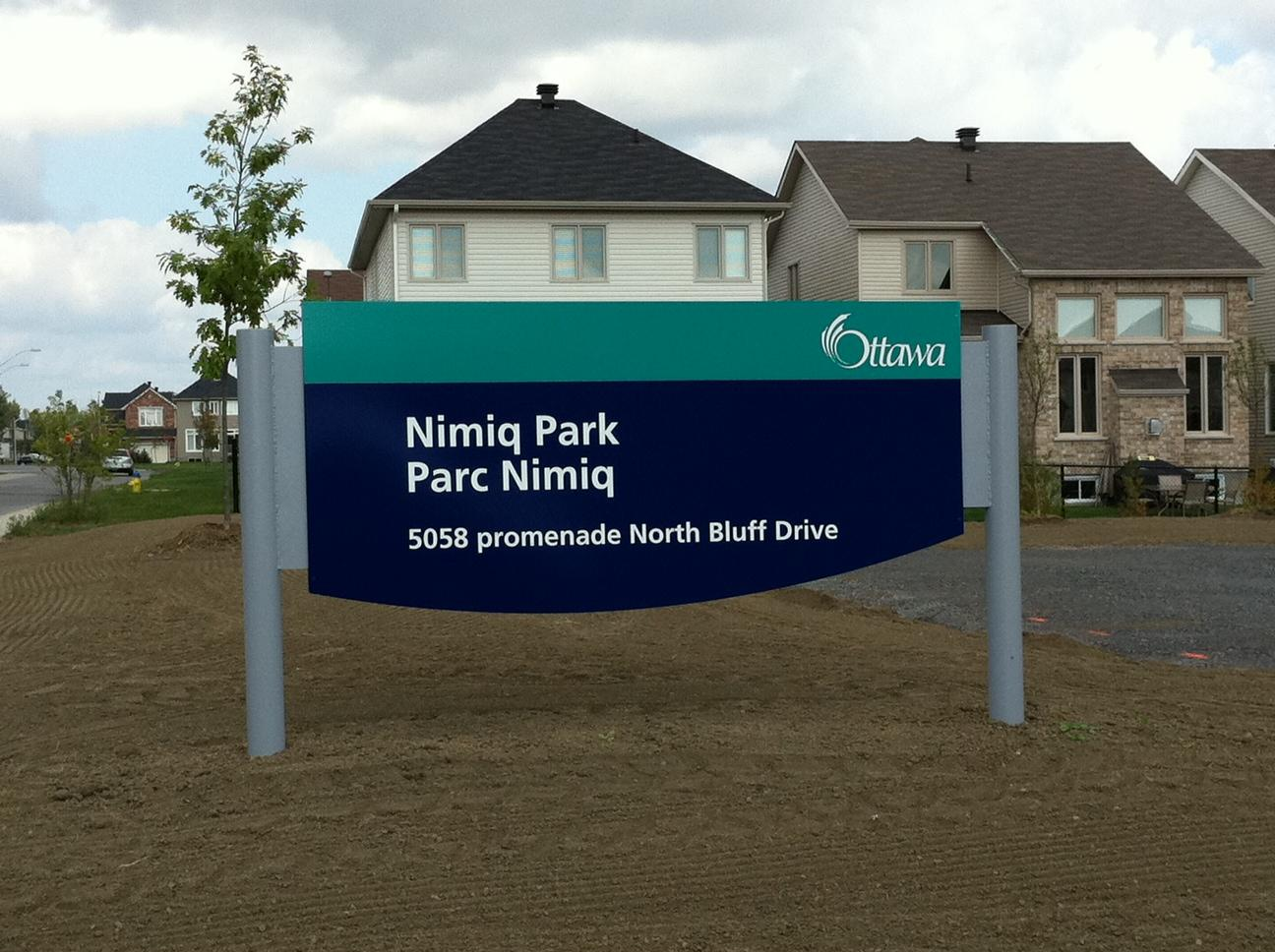
Nimiq Park in Riverside South in Ottawa - named after the Nimiq satellites

== Nimiq-1 ==
Nimiq-1 was launched on 21 May 1999 by a Proton-K / Blok DM-03 launch vehicle from Baikonur Cosmodrome in Kazakhstan. It was Canada's first direct broadcast digital TV satellite and was paid for by Telesat, a Canadian communications company and subsidiary of Bell Canada Enterprises.

- Manufacturer: Lockheed Martin
- Satellite Type: Lockheed Martin, A2100AX
- Weight: 3,600 kg (7,900 lb)
- Dimensions: 5.8 x 2.4 x 2.4 m and a 27 m^{2} solar array
- DC power: 120 W
- Expected lifetime: 12 years
- Transponders: 32
- Vehicle: Proton-K / Blok DM3

== Nimiq-2 ==
Nimiq 2, launched on 29 December 2002 on a Proton Breeze M launch vehicle, includes 32 Ku-band transponders. Nimiq 2 provides additional bandwidth for High-definition television (HDTV) and interactive television applications. On 20 February 2003, Nimiq-2 experienced a partial power failure and as such can only power 26 of its 32 Ku-band transponders.

Nimiq 2's orbital slot, 123° West longitude, was changed to 91.61° East longitude during June 2019.

== Nimiq-3, -4i and -4iR ==
Nimiq-3 and Nimiq-4i were leased by Bell Satellite TV from DirecTV Inc. when they were already in orbit. Originally called Direct-TV3 and Direct-TV2 respectively, these Hughes HS-601 models were brought out of retirement and are currently used to share some of the workload from Nimiq-2 and Nimiq-1, respectively. They went online in Bell TV's stead in 2004 and 2006.

Nimiq-4i ran out of fuel and was replaced by Nimiq-4iR on 28 April 2007.

== Nimiq-4 ==
Nimiq-4 was launched on 19 September 2008, by a Proton-M / Briz M rocket from Baikonur Cosmodrome in Kazakhstan. It will replace Nimiq-4i, and will provide advanced services such as HDTV, specialty channels and foreign language programming.

- Manufacturer: EADS Astrium
- Satellite type: Astrium Eurostar E3000S
- Weight: 4,850 kg (10,690 lb)
- Dimensions: 39 metres solar array span
- Power: 12 kW at end of life
- Expected lifetime: 15 years
- Transponders: 32 Ku-band, and 8 in Ka-band
- Vehicle: Proton-M / Briz-M
- Location: 82.0 West

== Nimiq-5 ==
In 2009, Telesat announced plans to build and launch its 19th satellite, Nimiq-5. It selected International Launch Services (ILS) for the launch of the Nimiq-5 satellite in 2009. Space Systems/Loral has been selected as the manufacturer for Nimiq-5.

Dish Network is expected to lease all of the 32 Ku-band transponder payload. The satellite will be located at 72.7° West longitude.

The satellite's manufacturing plan also includes contracts with the Canadian satellite industry, including multiplexers and switches from Com Dev International Ltd. and antennas from MacDonald, Dettwiler and Associates, Ltd (MDA Ltd).

The Nimiq-5 satellite was shipped from the manufacturer, Space Systems Loral located in Palo Alto, California, to the Baikonur Cosmodrome in Kazakhstan, on 18 August 2009. Telesat Canada contracted with International Launch Services (ILS) in April 2007 for the launch of Nimiq-5 by an ILS Proton-M / Briz-M launch vehicle.

Nimiq-5 was successfully launched into space aboard a Proton M / Breeze M rocket from Baikonur Cosmodrome in Kazakhstan at 19:19:19 UTC on 17 September 2009.

== Nimiq-6 ==
Satellite has been be fully leased for its lifetime by Bell Satellite TV which will use it to service direct-to-home (DTH) satellite television subscribers across Canada.

Nimiq-6 was launched from Baikonur Cosmodrome on 17 May 2012.

- Manufacturer: Space Systems/Loral
- Satellite Type: LS-1300
- Launch mass: 4,745 kg (10,461 lb)
- Dimensions:
- Power: 25 kW
- Expected lifetime: 15 years
- Transponders: 32 Ku-band
- Vehicle: Proton-M / Briz-M
- Location: 91.1° West
