= Telesat =

Canadian satellite communications company

Telesat Corporation

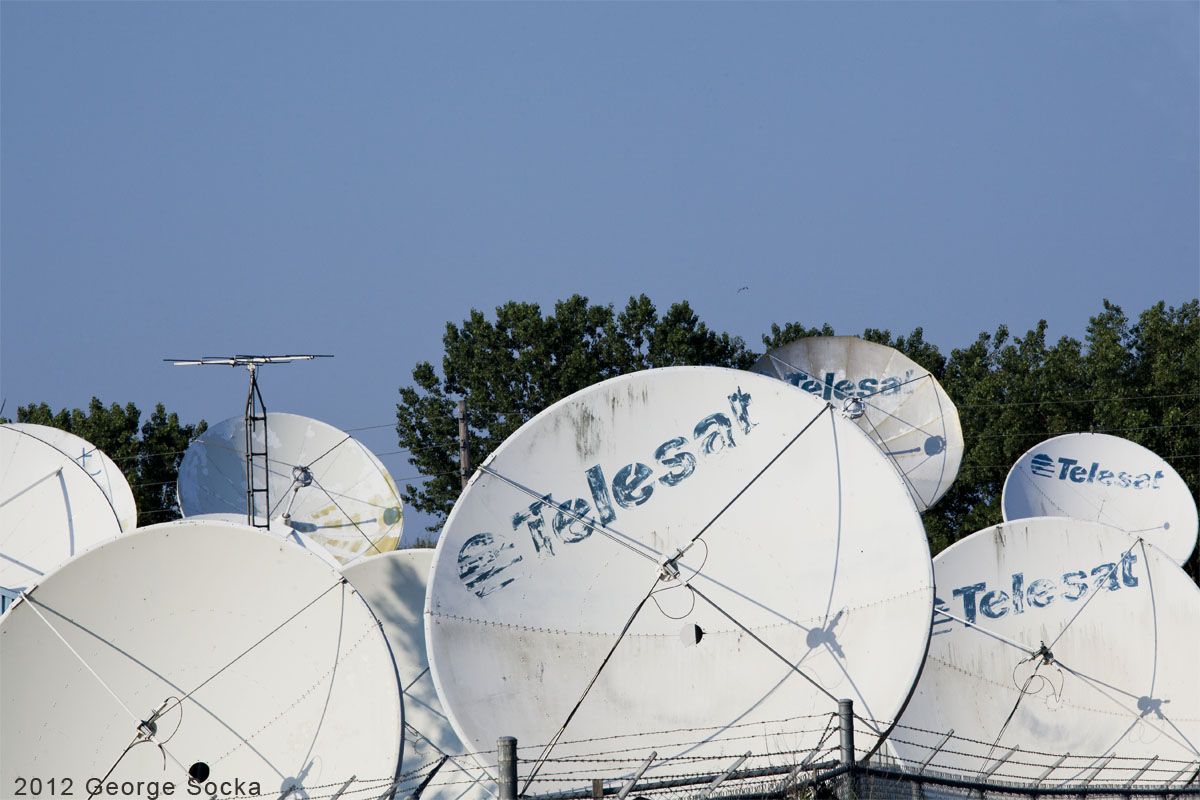
- Type: Public
- Traded as: Nasdaq: TSAT; TSX: TSAT; Russell 2000 Component
- Industry: Telecommunications
- Predecessors: Telesat Canada, Loral Skynet, AT&T Skynet
- Founded: May 2, 1969; 57 years ago
- Headquarters: Ottawa, Ontario, Canada
- Key people: Daniel S. Goldberg (CEO)
- Products: Satellite communications and integration services
- Parent: Loral Space (majority share)
- Website: telesat.com

Telesat Corporation, formerly Telesat Canada, is a Canadian-based satellite communications company that is majority-owned by American investors. The company was founded on May 2, 1969 and is headquartered in Ottawa.

== History ==
=== Founding and privatization (1969–2005) ===
Telesat began in 1969 as Telesat Canada, a Canadian Crown corporation created by an Act of Parliament. Telesat Canada launched Anik A1 in 1972 as the world's first domestic communications satellite in geostationary orbit operated by a commercial company; this satellite was retired from use in 1981. Until February 1979, Telesat had a legal monopoly on Earth stations in Canada: any entity wishing to send or receive satellite signals had to sign a long-term lease with Telesat Canada for an Earth station. Contracts for such leases were still enforced after the monopoly was ended.

Telesat Canada was privatized and sold by the federal government to Bell Canada in 1998.

=== Loral Space purchase (2006–2015) ===
On December 18, 2006, Loral Space & Communications announced that it, along with Canada's Public Sector Pension Investment Board (PSP Investments), would acquire Telesat for US$2.8 billion. On October 5, 2007, they received the final regulatory approval necessary to complete the acquisition of Telesat from BCE Inc. (the new holding company for Bell) for CAD$3.25 billion. The acquisition closed on October 31, 2007, with Loral owning 63% of Telesat.

At the same time, Telesat merged with Loral Skynet (formerly AT&T Skynet), a subsidiary of Loral Space & Communications. Loral Skynet was a full-service global satellite operator headquartered in Bedminster, New Jersey. This resulted in the transfer of all of the assets of Loral Skynet to Telesat.

Telesat announced on December 30, 2009, that Nimiq 6 was built by Space Systems/Loral (SS/L). Bell Satellite TV, a Canadian satellite TV provider agreed to fully lease the satellite for its lifetime to serve their subscribers across Canada. Nimiq 6 has a payload of 32 high-powered Ku-band transponders. It uses the SS/L1300 platform and has a 15-year mission life. It was launched in 2012 by International Launch Services (ILS).

On November 17, 2010: Telesat Holdings Inc. hired JPMorgan Chase & Co., Morgan Stanley and Credit Suisse Group AG to start a formal sales process and offer so-called staple financing to interest buyers for $6 billion to $7 billion.

MHI Launch Services (formerly H-IIA Launch Services) launched Telstar 12 VANTAGE for Telesat in November 2015 on a H2A204 variant of the H-IIA rocket, and it commenced service in December 2015.

=== Lightspeed LEO constellation (2016–Present) ===
In 2016 Telesat announced it would launch a low-Earth-orbit (LEO) constellation of 120 satellites, in polar orbit and in inclined orbits, about 1,000 km (620 mi) in altitude. The satellites would use the Ka-band, across 6 orbital planes, having at least 12 satellites in each plane. The siting of the orbital planes is to comply with the Canadian government's Enhanced Satellite Constellation Project, as well as providing global coverage. The constellation is officially named Telesat Lightspeed.

In 2017, Telesat expanded the LEO constellation plan to about 300 satellites, coupled with 50 ground stations across the globe. There would be about 80 polar orbit satellites, with the remainder in inclined orbits, for global coverage, including polar regions. The internet satellite constellation is targeted to have a 30-50 ms latency. The satellites are expected to be around 800 kg (1,800 lb) and last 10 years on orbit. The constellation is expected to have a 16-24 Tb/s capacity with 8 Tbit/s (1 TB/s) available for customers.

In 2018, the Phase 1 pathfinder test satellite for the LEO constellation was launched. Various customers and satellite transceiver equipment manufacturers started testing with the satellite.

In 2019, Telesat contracted with Blue Origin on their New Glenn rocket and Relativity Space with their Terran 1 rocket, for satellite launches to their LEO constellation.

In 2020, Telesat filed plans for expanding the satellite count to its LEO constellation to over 1,600 satellites. In November 2020, Telesat announced that it will become publicly traded on the American stock index NASDAQ in mid-2021.

In July 2023, LEO 3 satellite was launched. In August 2023, Telesat switched suppliers for its planned Lightspeed global internet network, from Thales Alenia Space to MDA. In 2025, Telesat continued to develop its Telesat Lightspeed program. In September 2023, Telesat announced a new contract with SpaceX for 14 launches with up to 18 satellites on each launch for the Lightspeed constellation, starting in mid-2026. Viasat signed a "substantial" contract to use the service in April 2025, shortly after smaller customer agreements were announced with Space Norway, Orange, and ADN Telecom.

== Services ==
The company is the fourth-largest fixed satellite services provider in the world. It owns a fleet of satellites, with others under construction, and operates additional satellites for other entities.

Telesat carries Canada's two major DBS providers signals: Bell Satellite TV and Shaw Direct, as well as more than 200 of Canada's television channels.

Telesat's Anik F2 carries a Ka-band spot beam payload for satellite Internet access for Wildblue users in the United States and Xplornet users in Canada. The KA band system uses spot beams to manage bandwidth concerns, linking to multiple satellite ground stations connected to the Internet.

== Offices ==
City	Country	Region
Ottawa, Ontario	Canada	Worldwide
Allan Park, Ontario	Canada	Canada
Calgary, Alberta	Canada	Canada
Montreal, Quebec	Canada	Canada
Toronto, Ontario	Canada	Canada
Winnipeg, Manitoba	Canada	Canada
Vancouver, British Columbia	Canada	Canada
North Bethesda, Maryland	United States	United States (Sale Representative)
Arlington, Virginia	United States	United States Government Services
Bedminster, New Jersey	United States	United States
Mount Jackson, Virginia	United States	North America
London, England	United Kingdom	Europe, Middle East and Africa
Rio de Janeiro, Rio de Janeiro	Brazil	Latin America
Singapore	Singapore	Asia

== Satellites launched for Telesat ==
- Anik A1 – 1972
- Anik A2 – 1973
- Anik A3 – 1975
- Anik B – 1978
- Anik D1 – 1982 – decommissioned 1991
- Anik C3 – 1982
- Anik C2 – 1983 – sold to Paracom S.A. 1993
- Anik D2 – 1984 – sold to GE Americom 1991 and ARABSAT 1993
- Anik C1 – 1985 – sold to Paracom S.A. 1993 and decommissioned 2003
- Anik E2 – 1991
- Anik E1 – 1991
- MSAT-1 – 1996
- Nimiq-1 – 1999
- Anik F1 – 2000
- Nimiq-2 – 2002
- Estrela do Sul 1 (Telstar 14) – 2004
- Anik F2 – 2004
- Anik F1R – 2005
- Anik F3 – 2007
- Telstar 11N – entered service on 31 March 2009
- Nimiq-4 – 2008
- Nimiq-5 – 2009
- Telstar 14R (Estrela do Sul 2) – 2011 – North solar array did not fully deploy.
- Nimiq-6 – 2012
- Telstar 12V – 2015
- Telesat LEO 1 – 2018
- Telstar 19V – 2018
- Telstar 18V – 2018
- Telesat LEO 3 – 2023
