= Astra 5A =

Failed geostationary communications satellite

- Names: Sirius 2 GE-1E
- Mission type: Communications
- Operator: Nordiska Satelit AB / GE Americom / SES Sirius AB / SES Astra
- COSPAR ID: 1997-071A
- SATCAT no.: 25049
- Mission duration: 15 years (planned); 11 years, 2 months (achieved)

Spacecraft properties
- Spacecraft: Sirius 2
- Spacecraft type: Spacebus
- Bus: Spacebus 3000B2
- Manufacturer: Aérospatiale
- Launch mass: 2,920 kg (6,440 lb)
- Dry mass: 1,250 kg (2,760 lb)
- Power: 6.5 kW

Start of mission
- Launch date: 12 November 1997, 21:48 UTC
- Rocket: Ariane 44L H10-3 (V102)
- Launch site: Centre Spatial Guyanais, ELA-2
- Contractor: Arianespace
- Entered service: January 1998

End of mission
- Disposal: Graveyard orbit
- Deactivated: April 2009
- Last contact: 16 January 2009

Orbital parameters
- Reference system: Geocentric orbit
- Regime: Geostationary orbit
- Longitude: Astra 5°E (1997-April 2008); Astra 31.5°E (April 2008-2009)

Transponders
- Band: 32 (+8) Ku-band
- Bandwidth: 26 transponders at 33 MHz; 6 transponders at 36 MHz
- Coverage area: Sweden, Central Europe, Southern Europe, Middle East

Astra 5A was one of the Astra communications satellites owned and operated by SES at the Astra 31.5°E. Launched in 1997 to the 5° East position by NSAB (Nordiska Satelit AB) (later SES Sirius, and now a non-autonomous part of SES) as Sirius 2, operation of the satellite was transferred to SES in April 2008 and the craft renamed and moved to 31.5° East to open up a new orbital position for the company for the development of markets in Central and Eastern Europe and the Middle East.

Astra 5A failed in orbit in 2009.

== Sirius 2 / GE-1E ==
Sirius 2 is a 32 transponder satellite, used for direct-to-home (DTH) transmissions as well as video and data communication services. Sirius 2 has two DTH beams, each with 13 transponders used for transmission of TV channels to homes equipped with parabolic antennas. One of the beams transmits to the Nordic area and the other towards central and southern Europe. GE AMERICOM, later SES Americom, operates 13 of the transponders in the European beam, originally under the name GE-1E. Sirius 2 has a third beam, for video and data communications. It consists of six 36 MHz transponders and covers northern and central Europe.

== Market ==
The Astra 5A satellite provided two broadcast beams, of horizontal and vertical polarisation, across two footprints, called the CEE (Central and Eastern European) beam and the PE (pan-European) beam. The CEE beam provides reception on a 60 cm dish from Poland to northern Turkey, and the Balkans to the Black Sea, while the PE beam extends 60 cm coverage from Tunisia to the Urals and from the Baltic states to Israel.

Countries covered include Armenia, Azerbaijan, Belarus, Bosnia, Bulgaria, Czech Republic, Georgia, Hungary, Iran, Jordan, North Macedonia, Moldova, Poland, Romania, Russia, Serbia, Slovakia, Tunisia, Turkey, and Ukraine.

== Demise of satellite ==
On 16 January 2009, Astra 5A "experienced a technical anomaly leading to the end of the spacecraft's mission". All traffic ceased, with much of it (especially channels for German cable service, Kabel Deutschland) transferred to Astra 28.5° East. Transfer of services to Astra 1D was not practical because this satellite, although effectively co-located with Astra 5A, was in an inclined orbit and usable only for TV contribution services and other intermittent use.

In March 2009, SES Astra announced that in April 2009, the Astra 2C satellite was to be moved from the 28.2° East position to Astra 31.5°E to temporarily take over Astra 5A's mission until Astra 3B was launched to Astra 23.5°E, at which time another craft currently there could be released to 31.5°E. The move of Astra 2C was started in May 2009 and completed on 11 May 2009.

In 2010, Astra 3B came into service at Astra 23.5°E and Astra 1G was moved from that position to Astra 31.5°E to take over all broadcasting activity from Astra 2C, which was moved to Astra 19.2°E in September 2010.

In December 2013, it is expected that a new satellite, Astra 5B will be launched to the Astra 31.5°E position to permanently take over all broadcasting from this position.

After the loss of Astra 5A's Sun sensors (used to orient towards the Sun to charge the craft's batteries) the batteries quickly depleted rendering it impossible to send control information to the satellite. Collisions were a possibility, with Intelsat 802 stated the most probable. In April 2009, SES Astra said that they had managed to regain control of the satellite and that it had been moved out of geostationary orbit, into a higher one, presumably a graveyard orbit.

== See also ==
- Astra 1D co-located satellite
- Sirius 2 original designation
- SES satellite operator
- Astra satellite family
