= Wilrijk =

- District of Antwerp
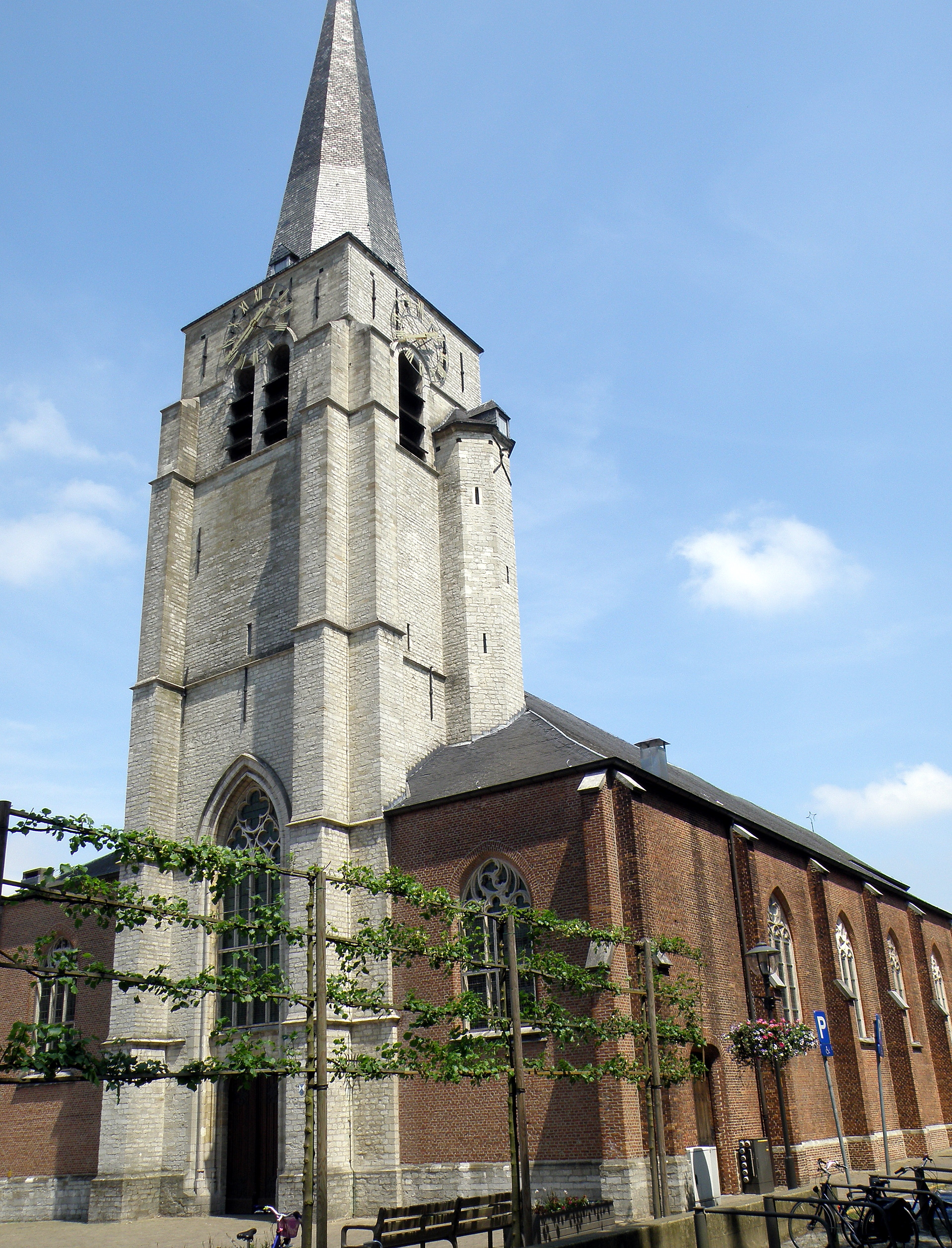

- Flag Coat of arms
- Interactive map of Wilrijk
- Location within Belgium Location within Antwerp Province
- Coordinates: 51°10′00″N 4°23′00″E
- Country: Belgium
- Community: Flemish Community
- Region: Flemish Region
- Province: Antwerp
- Arrondissement: Antwerp
- Municipality: Antwerp

Area
  - Total: 13.61 km^{2} (5.25 sq mi)

Population (2025-01-01)
  - Total: 42,729
  - Density: 3,140/km^{2} (8,131/sq mi)
- Postal codes: 2610
- Area codes: 03

Wilrijk (Dutch pronunciation: [ˈʋɪlrɛik]; former, original spelling: Wilrijck) is a district of the municipality and city of Antwerp in the Belgian province of Antwerp. Wilrijk had been a separate municipality before January 1, 1983; the enlarged municipality of Antwerp was decentralized in 2000 and Wilrijk became one of the city's nine districts.

This suburb is also known as the Goat village (Dutch: geitendorp), because of its Goat parade. Every five years, this parade attracts many tourists. The next one will be held in 2030.

== Overview ==
Although it is now part of the city of Antwerp, Wilrijk has kept its own distinct atmosphere. A mixture of modern and older neighborhoods, this suburb has a balance between residential, commercial and industrial activities. Its facilities for sport and recreation in a green environment make it a desirable area in which to live.

This area was already inhabited in 600 BC. This has been shown by the excavation of a Celtic burial site in Wilrijk, which is the oldest sign of civilization yet discovered in the region around Antwerp.

== Demography ==
The total area of Wilrijk is 13.61 km^{2} and it has 38,220 inhabitants (2004).

== Evolution of the population size ==
=== 19th century ===
Year	1806	1816	1830	1846	1856	1866	1876	1880	1890
Population size	1,629	1,626	2,009	2,356	2,355	2,985	3,827	3,908	5,495
Counted on 31 December

=== 20th century until fusion with Antwerp ===
Year	1900	1910	1920	1930	1947	1961	1970	1980	1982
Population size	6,043	7,810	9,634	20,361	26,150	37,396	43,485	43,161	41,967
Counted on 31ste of December until 1970 + 1 January 1980 + 31 December 1982

== History ==
=== From a Celtic settlement to a modern suburb ===
Probably the first time people lived in this area was around 600 BC. In 1003 the first document appeared in which the name uuilrika was mentioned. This document tells about the existence in 743 AD of a community living around the central square in Wilrijk which is called Bist. The triangular shape of the Bist shows the Frankish past of Wilrijk. One of the current theories is that the name Wilrijk is actually derived from the Gallo-Roman word Villariacum (meaning: "Part of the domain of a Roman villa"). Evidence for the existence of a Roman villa was found in a nearby village Kontich.

After the closing of the Zwyn and the decay of Bruges, the city of Antwerp became of more importance. At the end of the 15th century the foreign trading guilds moved from the city of Bruges to Antwerp. These "foreigners" were well received by the families of Antwerp. Some of the richer people from Antwerp escaped their busy lives in the center of the city and, attracted by the rural character of Wilrijk (and other towns surrounding Antwerp), started building large houses (little castles) there. These houses are called Hoven van plaisantie, some of these still exist even today: Klaverblad, Schoonselhof, Ieperman, Steytelinck, Middelheim, De Brandt, Hof Ter Beke. Others didn't survive: Jezuietenhof, Ooievaarsnest (Oversnes), Hoonsnest (Hondsnest of Hof van Van Dael), Groenenborgerhof, Elsdonkhof, Standonk, Korenbloem. But their names still remain in the consciousness of the people living in Wilrijk through names of streets and neighbourhoods.

On November 30, 1589 the village was completely burned by some Geuzen coming from Bergen op Zoom. It took Wilrijk 20 years to start rebuilding the houses, and in that time the population had to live in poor wooden huts.

In the middle of the 18th century an important road was built between Antwerp and Boom. Because of the expansion of Antwerp some suburbs (Kiel and Beerschot) that were a large source of food products for Antwerp, started to get too crowded. Their function was taken over by the farmers in Wilrijk and they started delivering milk, vegetables and flowers to Antwerp.

On October 6, 1819 Wilrijk received its own coat of arms from King William I of the Netherlands and the Hoge Raad van Adel. It consists of a picture of Saint Bavo as a knight on a blue background, with a falcon in his left hand and a sword in his right; the right corner contains an image of the Saint Bavo church in Wilrijk.

In the second half of the 19th century the town started to change because of the construction of two forts in the neighbourhood of Wilrijk (Fort 6 and 7) (1859–1865). These were part of a whole array of 8 forts protecting the city of Antwerp. At the same time some important connections were built between these fortifications, leading to new roads and railroads in Wilrijk and even a railway station.

Mayor M. Willems (1863–1870) started the planning of a new town hall. The architect of the province of Antwerp Eugeen Gife was given the task to design this new building, but it was the next mayor Jules Moretus (1870–1874) who would see the actual start of the construction. The town hall was finished in 1873, some changes were made to it in 1920, 1936, 1952, 1963, 1970 and 1977. Since 1994 it is officially protected as a monument.

Until the 19th century Wilrijk had stayed a rural, quite poor community independent of Antwerp. From then on many of the inhabitants started to search for work in the center of Antwerp, and Wilrijk flourished. In 1810 Wilrijk had 1660 inhabitants, this increased in 1840 to 2275, and in 1875 it were already 3553, to become 6243 in 1900. It was a slow evolution, and Wilrijk evolved from a rural village into a small suburb.

In the 20th century some of the Hoven van plaisantie were demolished, and their large surrounding parks were used to construct new housing projects. The primary goal was to create new urban areas after the First World War. The first new immigrants were mostly people moving from the city to the fresh air in the suburbs. Some of Wilrijk's districts that were created in this way are Eenheid, Elsdonk, and Valaar.

=== Wilrijk as a suburban town ===
When the population exceeded 20,000 inhabitants in 1928, the town acquired the Hof van plaisantie Steytelinck. From then on, Wilrijk had its own public park, close to the center.

During the Second World War, Wilrijk suffered a lot because of bombardments by the Germans with the V1 and V2. 71 civilians were killed by as much as 65 bombs.

After the war Wilrijk again started to grow rapidly. The agricultural character disappeared and was replaced by industry. Again many people migrated from the center of Antwerp to the suburbs. This time also the first high buildings appeared in Wilrijk. The population peaked. In 1950, 27,213 inhabitants, in 1956 30,000 and in 1964, 40,000. On January 1, 1975 the number of inhabitants was officially 44,219, from this day, the population decreased steadily.

In 1960 the town council decided to renew the town center. This urbanistic project included some high buildings, a shopping center and a cultural center. It was agreed to create a large industrial area of 1.5 km^{2} next to the important economical axes Antwerp-Boom (Boomsesteenweg (A12)). More than 6000 people are employed in this area right now.

Because of the increase in traffic the Boomsesteenweg (A12) was modernised in 1958 (also because of the Expo '58 in Brussels). In 1978 the highway Antwerp-Brussels (E10, now called E19) and the R11 were constructed, further dividing Wilrijk into different parts. The communal road network was more than 200 km.

Until then Wilrijk had been an independent town with its own town council and mayor, but this was about to change.

=== Wilrijk as part of Antwerp ===
On January 1, 1983 Wilrijk became, together with seven other communities – Antwerp, Wilrijk, Borgerhout, Ekeren, Hoboken, Merksem and Deurne – part of one big city of Antwerp, now a city with more than 500,000 inhabitants. All the former towns became "districten (in Dutch)" of Antwerp. Many city services were centralised and the town (district) council lost almost all of its powers. Every district kept its own districtshuis (former town hall) with services like: information, social affaires, registry of births, deaths and marriages, etc.

However, this move to a centralised administration created some resistance among the inhabitants. In a gesture "to bring the government back to the civilians" a decentralisation was started on January 1, 2001. Some of the powers reverted to the districts, including: the "look" of the town, youth policy, festivities, sports and communication.

== Lange Wapper ==
Lange Wapper is a mythical being appearing in many folk tales in Flanders. According to belief (especially from people living in Wilrijk) Lange Wapper was born in Wilrijk, near the Hoven van plaisantie De Brandt and Middelheim on the fields of farmer Peer-January. One day he found a huge red cabbage between his vegetables. He touched it, and found out that it was actually a newborn. Because he was too poor to raise the child, it was adopted by a family from Antwerp. The boy grew up, and he became known as someone who always protected the helpless. One day he saved an old lady from drowning and she gave him the gift to make himself very tall or very small whenever he liked it. This is how he got his name Lange (Long) Wapper. Since he always protected people he got some respect, but he also made some strange noises, sounding like a goat, and that's why he also became known as a water devil.

Since people in Wilrijk wanted to make sure the entire world would believe that Lange Wapper really was theirs, they organised a great party in 1964 to baptise an 8 meter long giant, Lange Wapper, with beer in the presence of a monk from Deerlijk. After that the giant was officially made an inhabitant (honoris causa) of Wilrijk by mayor Kiebooms. This, of course, created only more discussion between the center of Antwerp and Wilrijk about who actually "owned" Lange Wapper.

He is one of the main figures of the Goat parade in Wilrijk.

== Cultural activities ==
=== Goat parade (Geitestoet) ===
In the period that Wilrijk was still a poor town, many people kept a little goat at home, to provide meat and milk if needed. Because of this, the richer people were laughing with the silly people from Wilrijk with their goats. When in 1895 there was an election for the town council, there was a big election fight between the Catholic and the liberal parties. The liberals accused the Catholics of fraud, and because the people of Wilrijk didn't want to listen to them, they called them 'Goat heads' (Geitekoppen (Dutch language)). From this time on, Wilrijk was known as the 'Goat town'. As with many of these names, after a while it become a title of honor for people living in Wilrijk. So, when in 1965 Wilrijk celebrated its 1200-year existence, the people organised a 'Goat parade', consisting of decorated carts, people wearing costumes and of course...goats. There was also a cart showing Lange Wapper.

After the fusion with Antwerp in 1983, people became nostalgic and examined their common past. Plans were made to organize a new Goat parade, which, after 25 years, resumed on September 16, 1990. Since then, a Goat parade is organised every five years (1995, 2000, 2005). The last one featured: 1500 participants in special costumes, 10 groups of dancers, 12 decorated carts, 16 groups of musicians, giants, coaches, horses, ... and a record breaking number of goats.

=== Annual fair (Jaarmarkt) ===
In many towns there is an ancient custom to have an Annual Fair to create an opportunity for farmers to show and trade their livestock. All the farmers in the region come to the town with the livestock or other goods they want to sell. Over time this has evolved in a larger cultural event. This annual fair is still held every year in Wilrijk in August. It consists of a weekend during which a large number of activities are organised: a painters competition, an old-timer rally, a funfair and art exhibitions. In the streets surrounding the town hall you can find farmers showing their animals (goats, horses, cows and other livestock) and there are also competitions to decide which farmers have the best animals.

== Notable natives ==
- Toby Alderweireld (born 1989), footballer
- Kathleen Van Brempt (born 1969), politician
- Bruno Brokken (born 1953), high jumper
- Mousa Dembélé (born 1987), footballer
- Mark Dedrie (born 1962), sculptor
- Gabriel Fehervari (born 1960), businessman and CEO of the former Alfacam Group
- Frans Grootjans (born 1922), politician and minister for the PVV
- Victor Guidalevitch (1892–1962), engineer and photographer
- Paul Lemmens (born 1954), judge at the European Court of Human Rights
- Brian Lesher (born 1971), baseball player
- Jan Leyers (born 1958), singer
- Rik Van Linden (born 1949), cyclist
- Linda Mertens (born 1978), singer
- Mohamed Messoudi (born 1984), footballer
- Sven Pichal (born 1979), radio presenter
- Kristof Snelders (born 1982), footballer
- Rudy Trouvé (born 1967), musician
- Dirk Verbeuren (born 1975), heavy metal drummer
- Carl Verbraeken (born 1950), president of the Union of Belgian Composers
- Koen Vervaeke (born 1959), diplomat
- Marcia De Wachter (born 1953), economist
- Ronald de Witte (born 1946), cyclist
- Constant de Deken (1852-1896), missionary and explorer

== Personalities linked to the town ==
- Kim Clijsters, Tennis Player. Student of the Wilrijk tennis school in 1996
- Knight Édouard Parthon de Von, diplomat, horticulturist, writer, lived in Wilrijk
- Karel Poma (mayor of Wilrijk 1953-1958), chemist and politician

== Sport ==
- The town hosted the archery events for the 1920 Summer Olympics in Nachtegalen Park.
- VTV (Vlaamse Tennis Vereniging): A tennis school where Kim Clijsters trained in 1996 and where she met her coach Carl Maes (1996–2002).
- K Beerschot VA (football club)
- SK Wilrijk (football club)
- Antarctica (large ice-skating facility)
- Aspen (artificial skiing slope)
- AVI (athletics club)
- Wilrace (table tennis)
- Royal Antwerp Eagles (baseball)
- Cricket (Indian cricket club)

== Twin towns ==
- Niedernhausen, Germany

== Commercial/industrial/institutional sites ==
- University of Antwerp Campus Drie Eiken: One of the four campuses of the University of Antwerp (the site in Wilrijk was formerly known as UIA (Universitaire Instelling Antwerpen)
- Faculty for Comparative Religion
- Jewish Rabbinical School
- IKEA: One of the 6 IKEA stores in Belgium. Size store: 18.600 m^{2},
- Agfa-Gevaert: Part of the Agfa Gevaert Mortsel site
- The Coca-Cola Company: One of the three production/distribution centers of The Coca-Cola Company in Belgium. Number of employees: 541 (in 2005)
- ISVAG: A large facility that burns household waste from Antwerp and other towns in the region. Burns 100,000-150,000 tons a year
- Atlas Copco Airpower: The largest fabrication facility of air compressors in the world. Number of employees: 2300 (in 2005)
- Rizla: Part of the Imperial Tobacco Group it is a major producer of tobacco rolling papers in the world. The site in Wilrijk has 160 employees and produces 30 billion leaves a year (2004).

== Jain Temples ==
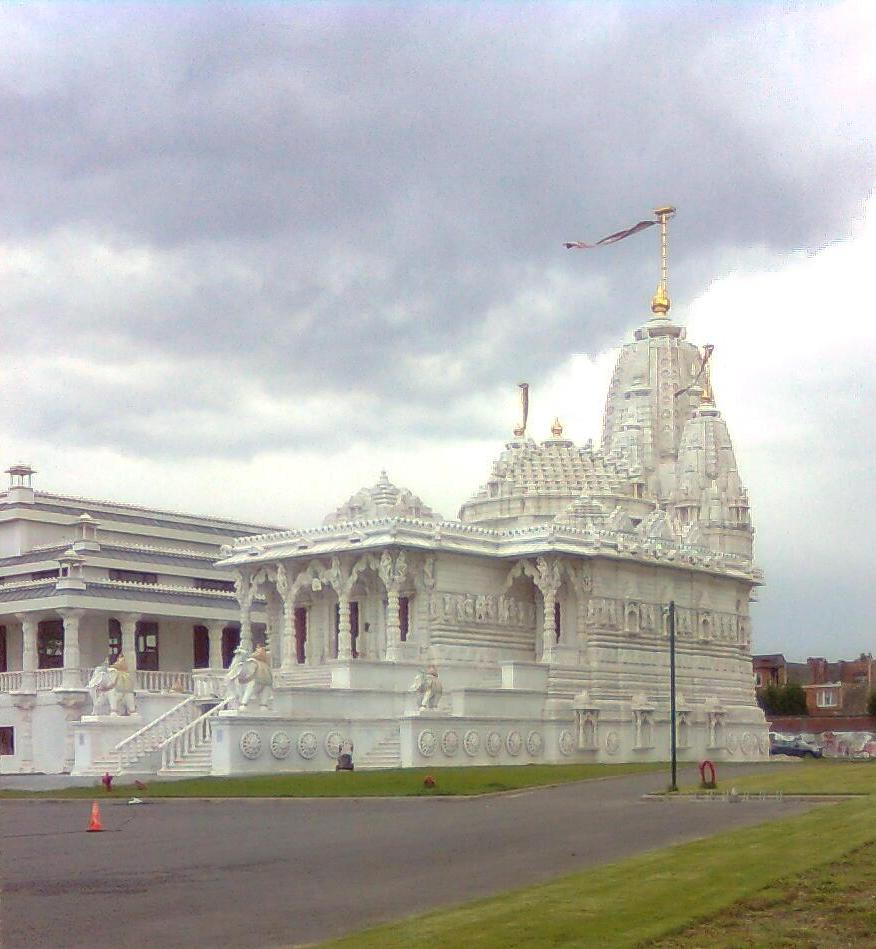
Jain Temple at Wilrijk

- Jain Temples at Wilrijk
