= Michel Lysight =

Belgian composer (born 1958)

Michel Lysight (born 1958) is a Belgian-Canadian composer.

== Career ==
Born in Brussels, after two years of study in art history, Lysight entered the Conservatoire royal de Bruxelles where he obtained the first prizes in music history, music theory, psycho-pedagogy, harmony, counterpoint, fugue and bassoon. He also holds advanced degrees in music theory and chamber music. He has worked as an orchestra conductor with René Defossez and Robert Janssens in whose class he received his first prize with distinction in 1997 and the higher diploma in 2002.

Lysight's first composition prize was awarded in 1989 at the Conservatoire royal de Mons in Paul-Baudouin Michel's class. Quatrain for wind quartet won the 1990 Prix Irene Fuerison from the Académie Royale des Beaux-Arts. The Silver Medal with mention from the Académie Internationale de Lutèce (Paris) was awarded to him in 1992 on the occasion of its international composition competition. The Union of Belgian Composers awarded him the 1997 Trophée Fuga for his work in favor of the national repertoire.

The influence of musicians such as Steve Reich, John Adams, Arvo Pärt and Henryk Górecki is felt in his music and makes him one of the leading figures of the Nouvelle musique consonante current in Belgium. Lysight is a member of the SABAM, the Union of Belgian Composers, and the Belgian Centre for Music Documentation (CeBeDeM). His catalogue contains about a hundred works, many of which are recorded on discs. Most of his works are included in the catalogue of Alain Van Kerckhoven Éditeur.

Lysight is a professor at the Royal Conservatory of Brussels and at the Academies of Schaerbeek and Brussels. He regularly gives lectures on contemporary music, chairs the jury of the Kaufmann European Music Competition and has been a visiting professor at the Bilkent University in Ankara.

== Works ==
- Transitions for piccolo (or flute), saxophone (or clarinet) and piano (2019); Alain Van Kerckhoven Éditeur
- Chronographie VIII for viola (or cello) and piano (2004); Alain Van Kerckhoven Éditeur; CeBeDeM
- Homage to Fibonacci for 2 violas (2004); Éditions Delatour; CeBeDeM
- Meditation for viola and guitar (or harp, or harpsichord, or marimba, or piano) (2009); Alain Van Kerckhoven Éditeur
- Samarkand for viola (or clarinet) and piano (or string quartet) (1992, 1995); Alain Van Kerckhoven Éditeur
- Septentrion for viola (or clarinet) and piano, or string quartet, or string orchestra (2005); Éditions Delatour; CeBeDeM
- Thrène for viola (or violin, or cello) and piano (1995); Alain Van Kerckhoven Éditeur
- Trois Croquis for viola (or violin, or cello) and piano (1990); Alain Van Kerckhoven Éditeur
