= Astra 5B =

Communications satellite for Eastern Europe

Astra 5B/3C
- Names: Astra 5B (2014-2023); Astra 3C (2023-)
- Mission type: Communications
- Operator: SES S.A.
- COSPAR ID: 2014-011B
- SATCAT no.: 39617
- Website: https://www.ses.com/
- Mission duration: 15 years (planned); 12 years, 4 months, 22 days (elapsed)

Spacecraft properties
- Spacecraft type: Eurostar
- Bus: Eurostar-3000
- Manufacturer: Astrium (now Airbus Defence and Space)
- Launch mass: 5,724 kg (12,619 lb)

Start of mission
- Launch date: 22 March 2014, 22:04 UTC
- Rocket: Ariane 5 ECA (VA216)
- Launch site: Centre Spatial Guyanais, ELA-3
- Contractor: Arianespace
- Entered service: 2 June 2014

Orbital parameters
- Reference system: Geocentric orbit
- Regime: Geostationary orbit
- Longitude: 31.5° East (2014-2023); 23.5° East (2023-)

Transponders
- Band: 43 transponders: 40 Ku-band; 3 Ka-band
- Coverage area: Europe

Astra 5B (now called Astra 3C) is one of the Astra communications satellites owned and operated by SES. It was launched as SES' 56th satellite in March 2014, to the newest of the Astra orbital positions for direct-to-home (DTH) satellite television, at 31.5° East for DTH, DTT and cable use in Eastern Europe,.

The satellite replaced the Astra 1G satellite at 31.5° East, which was itself filling in at that position after the loss of the Astra 5A satellite (originally called Sirius 2) in 2009, Astra 2C was first used at 31.5° East to replace Astra 5A, with Astra 1G positioned there in 2010.

Astra 5B was the third satellite to be launched of four ordered together by SES from Astrium (now Airbus Defence and Space) in 2009. The similar Astra 2E and Astra 2F were launched to Astra 28.2°E before Astra 5B in 2013 and 2012, respectively, and the fourth, Astra 2G was launched later, in 2014.

== Market ==
The Astra 5B satellite provided two Ku-band broadcast beams, each of horizontal and vertical polarisation, across two footprints, called the High Power beam and the Wide beam.

- The High Power beam provides reception on a 50 cm dish in Eastern Europe, the Balkans, Greece, Turkey and the Caucasus to the Black Sea.
- The Wide beam enables reception on a 60 cm dish over the same area and in addition, the Baltic states and much of Eastern Russia.

Within these reception areas, Astra 5B provided capacity for direct-to-home (DTH) broadcasting, direct-to-cable (DTC), and contribution feeds to digital terrestrial television networks.

The satellite will also carry a hosted L-band payload for the European Geostationary Navigation Overlay Service (EGNOS) as EGNOS GEO-2.

== History ==
Astra 5B was ordered by SES in 2009 and built by Astrium (now Airbus Defence and Space) on the Eurostar-3000 satellite bus. The launch was originally scheduled for launch in the second quarter of 2013, but that launch was cancelled because the other satellite (Optus 10) which was due to accompany Astra 5B on the Ariane 5 launch was pulled from the manifest pending a possible sale of Optus.

The launch was then planned for 6 December 2013 with Hispasat's Amazonas 4A satellite as the co-passenger, but it was announced in November 2013 that the launch had been postponed until January 2014 by delays to the availability of the Amazonas craft. Finally, Ariane 5 VA216 was launched on 22 March 2014.

Astra 5B began commercial operation at the Astra 31.5°E position on 2 June 2014, and by the end of June 2014 had 18 active transponders carrying channels for eastern Europe.

In July 2023 it was reported that all broadcasts had ceased and the satellite had moved to 23.5° East alongside Astra 3B. There, channels broadcasting on Astra 3B began to be transferred to Astra 5B (indicating a problem with Astra 3B, which still had some two years of its design life remaining) and Astra 5B was renamed Astra 3C.

== See also ==
- Astra 31.5°E orbital position
- Astra 5A previous satellite replaced
- Astra 1G co-located satellite
- SES satellite operator
- Astra satellite family
