= Astra 3A =

Communications satellite

- Mission type: Communications
- Operator: SES
- COSPAR ID: 2002-015B
- SATCAT no.: 27400
- Website: https://www.ses.com/
- Mission duration: 12 years (planned); 20 years, 10 months (achieved)

Spacecraft properties
- Bus: HS-376HP
- Manufacturer: Boeing Satellite Systems
- Launch mass: 1,514 kg (3,338 lb)
- Power: 1.6 kW

Start of mission
- Launch date: 29 March 2002, 01:29 UTC
- Rocket: Ariane 44L H10-3 (V139)
- Launch site: Centre Spatial Guyanais, ELA-2
- Contractor: Arianespace
- Entered service: May 2002

End of mission
- Disposal: Graveyard orbit
- Deactivated: January 2023

Orbital parameters
- Reference system: Geocentric orbit
- Regime: Geostationary orbit
- Longitude: 23.5° East (2002–2013); 177° West (2013–2016); 86.5° East (2016); 47° West (2017–2019); 86.5° West (2019–2020)

Transponders
- Band: 20 Ku-band
- Bandwidth: 36 MHz
- Coverage area: Europe

Astra 3A is one of the Astra communications satellites owned and operated by SES, launched in March 2002 to the Astra 23.5°E orbital position to provide digital television and radio for direct to home (DTH) and cable, multimedia and interactive services, corporate networks, and occasional and other business services to Europe.

The satellite provides two broadcast beams, of horizontal and vertical polarisation, across two footprints that covered essentially the same areas of Europe – principally the countries of central Europe.

== History ==
Astra 3A was launched to provide follow-on capacity to replace the DFS Kopernikus-3 satellite and deliver additional capacity for the Benelux countries and central Europe, to create SES-Astra's third major European satellite hotspot after Astra 19.2°E and Astra 28.2°E with access to channels at both positions using a single dish fitted with a monoblock Duo LNB. In that role, television signals could be received with a 50 cm dish across Germany, Austria, Switzerland, Belgium, the Netherlands, Luxembourg, the Czech Republic, most of Denmark, and in parts of France, Italy, Poland, Slovenia, and Slovakia. Reception was even possible as far afield as Scotland, Sweden and Serbia when a larger dish (around 110 cm) was used.

In addition to contribution feeds and individual television channels, Astra 3A carried pay television networks including Kabel Deutschland (Germany), Canal Digitaal (Netherlands), TV Vlaanderen (Belgium), CS Link (Slovakia and Czech Republic) and Skylink (Slovakia and Czech Republic). On 1 February 2012 Kabel Deutschland left Astra 3A and during 2012 other services were transferred off the satellite. As of October 2012, Astra 3A was in an inclined orbit at 23.7° East with all services carried by the adjacent Astra 3B satellite.

In November 2013, Astra 3A was moved to 176.9° West where it remained, in inclined orbit, to provide backup to SES' NSS-9 satellite. In June 2016, Astra 3A was moving east at approximately 1.5°/day and was subsequently positioned at 86.5° West. In November 2016 it started moving east at approx 0.5°/day until positioned at 47° West in mid-February 2017 alongside SES' NSS-806 satellite (replaced by SES-14 in January 2018). Towards the end of October 2019, Astra 3A started moving west at approx 0.8°/day until returned to 86.5° West in December 2019. The satellite was retired to a graveyard orbit in January 2023

== See also ==
- Astra 23.5°E former orbital position
- SES (operator)
- Astra satellite family
- Astra 3B replacement satellite
- DFS-Kopernikus previous position holder
