= Astra 23.5°E =

Group of communications satellites

Astra 23.5°E is a group of Astra communications satellites co-located at the 23.5° east position in the Clarke Belt owned and operated by SES based in Betzdorf, Luxembourg. 23.5° east is one of the major TV satellite positions serving Europe (the others being at 19.2° East, 13° East, 28.2° East, and 5° East).

The satellite currently occupying this position is the Astra 3B craft, which provide for services downlinking in the 10.70 GHz-12.70 GHz range of the K_{u} band and 21.40-22.00 GHz range of the K_{a} band across most of Central, Western and Eastern Europe and West Asia.

A major reason for the usage of Astra 23.5°E as a source for direct-to-home (DTH) broadcasting is its proximity to Europe's primary DTH position, Astra 19.2°E, allowing the use in target countries of a single small dish fitted with a monoblock Duo LNB to receive channels from both positions.

== Satellite craft in use ==
=== Current ===
- Astra 3B (launched in 2010)
- Astra 3C (launched in 2014, formerly Astra 5B)

=== Previous ===
- Astra 3A (launched 2002, retired)
- Astra 1D (launched 1994, retired)
- Astra 1E (launched 1995, retired)
- Astra 1G (launched 1997, retired)
- Thor 2 (launched 1997, retired)
- DFS-Kopernikus 1 operated by Deutsche Telekom (launched 1989, retired)
- DFS-Kopernikus 3 operated by Deutsche Telekom (launched 1994, retired)

== Market ==
Astra 23.5°E is a major source of TV and radio channels and multimedia services for parts of Europe. While the satellite Astra 3B can reach most parts of the continent, this position is primarily used for channels broadcast to the countries of Northwestern, Central and Eastern Europe, in particular: Belgium, Bulgaria, Czech Republic, Germany, Hungary, Netherlands, and Slovakia.

A service of local, regional and ethnic channels for Italy is expected from this orbital position following an agreement in November 2009 between SES and Milano Teleport to offer capacity to Italian broadcasters.

TV channels for (DTH) networks, Canal Digitaal (Netherlands), TV Vlaanderen (Belgium, Flanders), CS Link (Slovakia and Czech Republic), Skylink (Slovakia and Czech Republic) and Satellite BG (Bulgaria), broadcast from this position. In all, over 390 TV and radio channels are broadcast from Astra 23.5°E to almost 2.5 million homes in Europe.

In January 2011 Astra announced that Bulgarian DTH operator Satellite BG would use three transponders on Astra 3B at 23.5°E for broadcasting a package of more than 60 standard definition channels and 12 high definition channels, including sports, film, factual and children's TV, and all major Bulgarian public and commercial services to TV homes across Bulgaria.

Astra 23.5°E was the home of Euro1080, Europe's first full-time commercial HDTV broadcaster since January 1, 2004, until they moved their channels to Eutelsat W3A (7° east) in late 2008.

The Astra 23.5°E position is also home to Astra Connect (was ASTRA2Connect), a two-way satellite broadband service that delivers high-speed Internet access and triple-play capabilities to consumers in Europe.

== Capacity and reach ==
As of December 2019 the Astra satellites at 23.5° east broadcast on 64 transponders (4 Ka-band and 60 Ku-band) to 37.5 million households (10.3 million via cable, 24.4 million via IPTV and 29 million direct to home satellite dishes).

== History ==
The 23.5° east orbital position was first occupied by the DFS-Kopernikus 1 and DFS-Kopernikus 3 satellites, launched in June 1989 and October 1992, respectively, to provide channel feeds to German cable headends for Deutsche Bundespost (later, Deutsche Telekom). DFS-Kopernikus 1 was first positioned at 23.5° east and then moved to 33.5° east with the launch of DFS-Kopernikus 3. As DFS-Kopernikus 3 neared the end of its life, an agreement was reached with Deutsche Telekom for SES to use the German position and frequencies, and in August 2001, Astra 1D was moved to 23.5° east to provide follow-on capacity for DFS-Kopernikus F3 pending the launch of Astra 3A.

Astra 3A was launched in March 2002 to open the Astra 23.5°E position, and Deutsche Telekom contracted for 10 transponders, with all traffic on the old DFS-Kopernikus craft switched to Astra 3A.

With the establishment of Astra 1L at the Astra 19.2°E position in July 2007, Astra 1E was released from 19.2° east and moved to Astra 23.5°E to replace Astra 1D, which was approaching the end of its design life.

Following the launch of Astra 1M to the Astra 19.2°E position in November 2008, Astra 1G was moved from 19.2° east to Astra 23.5°E in February 2009 to provide additional capacity.

A new satellite, Astra 3B, was originally scheduled to be launched to Astra 23.5°E in the first quarter of 2010, to replace all the capacity currently at this orbital position, but was beset by launcher delays, postponed on the launch pad on March 24, 2010, and April 9, 2010, for a faulty pressure regulator in the Ariane 5 rocket's main stage. Astra 3B was finally successfully launched on May 21, 2010. and came into commercial service in June, after in-orbit testing, when Astra 1E and Astra 1G were released from service. In July 2010, Astra 1G was moved from Astra 23.5°E to Astra 31.5°E. Astra 1E remained at this position a little longer with no transponders in use, but in August 2010 it was moved westwards to Astra 5°E to provide backup for Astra 4A pending the launch of Astra 4B to that position in 2011.

In April 2011 the Thor 2 satellite moved to 23.5°E in an inclined orbit. Thor 2 was originally launched to 0.8°W on May 21, 1997, and retired from DTH service in 2008. It was leased from owners, Telenor by SES-Astra in 2008 and initially moved to the 5°E orbital position. In 2011 Thor 2 had only two active transponders, both carrying the channel, RTL Télé Lëtzebuerg. In January 2013 the Thor 2 de-orbited to the graveyard orbit.

On February 1, 2012 Kabel Deutschland ceased to use the Astra 23.5°E position for distribution, switching to its terrestrial fibre network.

In June 2013 Astra 1D left 23.5°E moving east (although it remained listed in the SES website as at this position) reaching 52.2°E as of June 30, 2013.

In November 2013, Astra 3A moved to 177°W to provide backup to SES' NSS-9 satellite.

In the summer of 2023, Astra 5B was moved from Astra 31.5°E to 23.5°E, co-locating with Astra 3B. Subsequently, Astra 5B was renamed Astra 3C and broadcast channels on Astra 3B began to be transferred, prompting speculation that Astra 3B was reaching the end of its commercial life some two years short of the planned mission duration.

== See also ==
- Astra 5°E
- Astra 19.2°E
- Astra 28.2°E
- Astra 31.5°E
- SES satellite owner
- ASTRA2Connect
- Duo LNB
- DFS-Kopernikus
