= HD2 (disambiguation) =

HD2 is one of the furthest galaxies known.

HD2 may also refer to:

- A Euro1080, high-definition television station in Europe
- An HD Radio, FM sub-channel designation
- HD 2 (BD+56 3142, SAO 21069), a star in the Henry Draper Catalogue. It is an F5 star located at (J2000.0; 00^{h} 05^{m} 05.9499^{s} +57° 46′ 13.224″)
- HTC HD2, a smartphone manufactured by HTC
- Hidden & Dangerous 2, 2003 video game
- Helldivers 2, 2024 video game
