= Astra 31.5°E =

Communications satellites at 31.5°E owned by SES

Coordinates: 0°N 31.5°E

Astra 31.5°E is the name for the group of Astra communications satellites co-located at the 31.5° east position in the Clarke Belt owned and operated by SES based in Betzdorf, Luxembourg. 31.5° east is SES' newest orbital location serving Europe (the others being at 19.2° east, 28.2° east, 23.5° east, and 5° east).

The first satellites to commercially exploit this position were the Astra 5A and Astra 1D craft, which provided for services downlinking in the 10.70 GHz-12.50 GHz range of the K_{u} band across Europe, Western Russia and the Middle East.

== Satellite craft in use ==
=== Current ===
- -

=== Previous ===
- Optus A3 (launched 1987, retired)
- Astra 1D (launched 1994, retired)
- Astra 1E (launched 1995, retired)
- Astra 1G (launched 1997, retired)
- Astra 5A (launched 1997, failed in orbit)
- Astra 5B (launched 2014)
- Astra 2B (launched 2000, retired)
- Astra 2C (launched 2001)

== Market ==
Astra 31.5°E is SES' newest satellite position, intended to develop the markets for direct-to-home (DTH) standard definition and high definition TV and radio broadcasting, interactive TV, cable contribution, and DTT and other terrestrial feeds in Eastern Europe and the Middle East – the latter not served by Astra satellites before.

Countries included within the intended market for this position, include Armenia, Azerbaijan, Belarus, Bosnia, Bulgaria, Czech Republic, Georgia, Hungary, Iran, Jordan, Macedonia, Moldova, Poland, Romania, Russia, Serbia, Slovakia, Tunisia, Turkey, and Ukraine.

The pan-European beam of Astra 5A provided capacity for cable distribution, DTT and other terrestrial feeds, while 5A's CEE beam provided a high-power footprint for the DTH market.

Following the failure of Astra 5A, its replacement first by Astra 2C and then by Astra 1G has provided similar coverage and, as of July 2010, there are eight transponders leased on this satellite, including one to provide IP backbone services to small and medium-sized ISPs in the Middle East and Caucasus region where terrestrial telecommunications infrastructures are underdeveloped.

In December 2010, SES announced two agreements for the lease of capacity on Astra 1G. The first was with the Ukrainian state-owned company, Ukrkosmos, to provide capacity at 31.5°E for broadcasting direct to Ukrainian homes and to cable head ends and terrestrial networks. The Ukrkosmos platform includes the channels UTR, Kultura, KDRTRK, Sport 1, Sport 2, Malyatko TV and Menu TV. The second agreement was with Central European Media Enterprises (CME) which contracted a transponder on Astra 1G for distribution of services to cable head ends in Romania and Bulgaria, starting in January 2011. CME provides TV channels including Pro TV, Pro TV International, Acasa, Pro Cinema, Sport.ro and MTV Romania to Romania and bTV, bTV Cinema, bTV Comedy, PRO.BG and RING.BG in Bulgaria, and is the "anchor customer" for Astra's 31.5°E slot.

== Capacity and reach ==
As of December 2019 the Astra satellites at 31.5° east broadcast on 46 transponders (6 Ka-band and 40 Ku-band) to 15.4 million households (11.8 million via cable, 1.9 million via IPTV and 1.6 million direct to home satellite dishes).

== History ==
The first hint of SES' plan to develop the 31.5° east position as a new 'hot spot' for satellite TV came with the positioning of the ancient Australian satellite, Optus A3 (launched 1987) at 31.5° East (albeit in a 9° inclined orbit), carrying SES test transmissions in July 2006, to occupy the slot until Astra craft could be moved there.

In November 2007, Astra 1D (originally launched to the Astra 19.2°E position but in July 2007 moved to help establish the Astra 23.5°E position) was approaching the end of its design life and was replaced at 23.5° east by Astra 1E. Astra 1D was moved to 31.5° east, where it operated in inclined orbit, to replace Optus A3.

In April 2008, Optus A3 was moved from the 31.5° east position and operation of the Sirius 2 satellite (owned by NSAB - later, SES Sirius - and launched in 1997 to the 5°E position) was transferred to SES and the craft was renamed Astra 5A and moved to 31.5° east to officially open up the new Astra 31.5°E position, although control of the craft in orbit was kept with the Swedish Space Corporation.

On January 16, 2009 Astra 5A "experienced a technical anomaly leading to the end of the spacecraft’s mission". All traffic ceased, with much of it (especially channels for German cable service, Kabel Deutschland) transferred to Astra 23.5°E. Astra 1D is not suitable for the transmission of these services because it is in an inclined orbit. In March 2009, SES announced that in April, the Astra 2C satellite was to be moved from the 28.2° east position to Astra 31.5°E to temporarily take over Astra 5A's mission until Astra 3B is launched to Astra 23.5°E, when another craft currently there can be released to Astra 31.5°E. The satellite move was started in May and completed on May 11 with the first transponders coming into use at the new position in the subsequent two weeks.

In June 2010, Astra 3B (launched May 2010) came into operation at Astra 23.5°E and Astra 1G was moved from that position to Astra 31.5°E, where it could release Astra 1D for use elsewhere and take over all broadcasting activity from Astra 2C. Astra 2C remained at the Astra 31.5°E position until September 2010, when it was moved to Astra 19.2°E while Astra 1N, which was intended for positioning at 19.2°E, was used at Astra 28.2°E.

Late in 2009 SES announced that a new satellite had been ordered for this position. Astra 5B was built by Astrium on the Eurostar E3000 platform for DTH, DTT and cable use in Eastern Europe, and was due to be launched in the second quarter of 2013. In October 2013, it was announced that Astra 5B would be launched on December 6, 2013. but in November 2013 SES announced postponement until January 2014 because of delays with the Amazonas 4A craft that was to accompany Astra 5B in the launch rocket. In February 2014 it was announced that the satellite would be launched on March 21, 2014 and the Astra 2B satellite was moved to 31.5°E to provide backup capacity pending the arrival of the new satellite (where it remained until December 2016).

Astra 5B was successfully launched to the Astra 31.5°E position on March 22, 2014 and entered commercial service on June 2, 2014.

In the summer of 2023, Astra 5B was moved to the 23.5° East position alongside Astra 3B and the Astra 31.5°E position became empty.

== See also ==
- Astra 5°E
- Astra 19.2°E
- Astra 23.5°E
- Astra 28.2°E
- SES satellite operator
- SES Sirius satellite's previous operator
- Optus satellites
- Central European Media Enterprises
