= Mark Dedrie =

Belgian sculptor

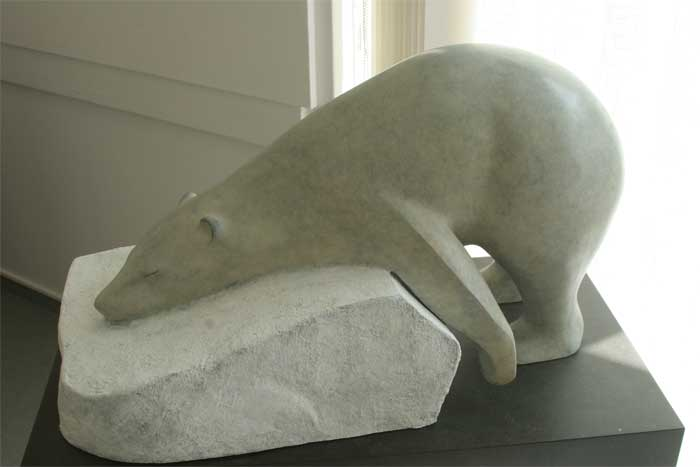
A sculpture of a bear by Mark Dedrie

Mark Dedrie (born 1962, Wilrijk, Belgium), is a Belgian sculptor. He was born in Wilrijk as the son of a baker. He had however no interest in the baker profession and started working at a bronze foundry, where he for nearly thirteen years worked as a bronzer (1983–1997). As a result of his work, he met many artists and decided to create his own sculptures. Since 1997, he has been creating his own sculptures in bronze and stainless steel. In 2008 he won the cultuurprijs Raymond Majean (Raymond Majean cultural prize).

== Sources ==
- Mark Dedrie (monography)
- Belgian Economic Mission to Canada presided by H.R.H. Prince Philippe (participant)
