= Paul Lemmens =

Belgian academic and lawyer

Judge of the European Court of Human Rights in respect of Belgium
- Incumbent
- Assumed office 13 September 2012

Personal details
- Born: 29 June 1954 (age 71) Wilrijk, Belgium

Paul Lemmens (born 29 June 1954) is a Belgian judge born in Wilrijk, Belgium and currently the judge of the European Court of Human Rights in respect of Belgium.
