= CS Link =

Czech company

- Company type: Private
- Industry: Telecommunication
- Founded: 2006; 20 years ago
- Headquarters: Prague, Czech Republic
- Key people: Daniel Klička, Managing Director
- Products: Direct broadcast satellite
- Parent: M7 Group (part of Canal+/Vivendi)
- Website: www.cslink.cz

CS Link was a satellite service that offers Czech and Slovak TV and radio stations to residents of Czech Republic and Slovakia.

Previously owned by J&T, CS Link was acquired by the Luxembourg media group M7 Group (Canal+ Luxembourg S.a.r.l.) in 2011. M7 Group (Canal+ Luxembourg S.a.r.l.) is part of Canal+/Vivendi since September 2019.

The original package included digital channels received without subscription (free-to-view) including HD channels and pay-TV channels. CS Link had 419,000 customers at the end of 2009. From September 2012 the company introduced a monthly service charge of 29 CZK, citing a tenfold increase in customer numbers in the five years up to that point. This change to the previously free model prompted a wave of customer complaints and resulted in an official complaint to the Office for the Protection of Competition (ÚOHS). In 2015 CS Link's monthly fee increased from 33 to 55 CZK, allowing users access to 36 standard definition and 12 high definition channels.

== See also ==
- Astra 3A
- Astra 23.5°E
- SES
- Astra
- HDTV
- Skylink (TV platform)
