= DFS Kopernikus =

DFS Kopernikus (meaning Deutscher Fernmeldesatellit Kopernikus) was the name of three geostationary satellites of Deutsche Bundespost and later Deutsche Telekom AG. They are no longer in use.

== DFS Kopernicus-3 ==
When DFS Kopernikus-3 was nearing the end of its life, SES sealed an agreement with Deutsche Telekom to use the 23.5° East position and frequencies, and in August 2001, Astra 1D was moved there. The Astra 23.5°E position was officially opened in March 2002 with the launch and positioning of Astra 3A. Deutsche Telekom contracted for 10 transponders on that craft and shortly switched over all traffic from DFS Kopernikus-3.

== Station keeping ==
The orbital station-keeping manoeuvres of the satellites were conducted by the Flight Dynamics Group of the German Aerospace Center (DLR), German Space Operations Center, in Oberpfaffenhofen, Bavaria until April 1994. The flight dynamics operations (including re-location and proximity operations) for the DFS and TV-SAT satellites were taken over by the Deutsche Telekom Flight Dynamics Team at the Usingen Ground Station location. A twin Flight Dynamics System was located at the Deutsche Telekom offices in Darmstadt. The latter was used for advanced planning and emergency/backup purposes; it was operated by a dedicated team of specialists. The two Telekom Flight Dynamics Systems were connected and could be remotely operated if needed. The Flight Dynamics System used by Deutsche Telekom was designed and implemented by Telesat Canada. It used real-time Kalman Filter algorithms for orbit and attitude determination. The satellites were located at the following positions:

- DFS Kopernikus-1: 23.5° East (1989-1994), later 33.5° East (1994-2002), replaced by Astra 3A
- DFS Kopernikus-2: 28.5° East (1994–2000?)
- DFS Kopernikus-3: 23.5° East (1994–2003)

== German satellite television market share in 1990 ==
- SES: ca. 80%
- DFS Kopernikus: ca. 20%
- TV-SAT 2: under 1%

== See also ==
- Nicolaus Copernicus
- Astra 23.5°E
- Astra 3A
