= Victor Guidalevitch =

Belgian photographer

- Born: 2 September 1892; Simferopol, Crimea
- Died: 19 January 1962 (aged 69); Wilrijk, Antwerp, Belgium
- Burial place: Wilrijk, Antwerp, Belgium
- Education: University of Liège, Liège
- Occupations: Photographer and engineer
- Spouse: Irma Rÿckaert

Victor Issay Guidalevitch (Russian: 'Виктор Иссаы Гидалевич') (2 September 1892 – 19 January 1962), was a Belgian engineer of Russian origin who became an amateur photographer.

Guidalevitch photographed his surroundings, street scenes, landscapes, works of art, circus acts and sportsmen. He used various processes such as bromoil and bromide and tended to favour small formats. The style of his photographs is marked by modernism and pictorialism. Some of his images have qualities usually attributed to Dutch still lives.

== Early life ==
Victor Guidalevitch was born in Simferopol, Crimea, Russian Empire on 2 September 1892.

== Migration to Belgium ==
Guidalevitch emigrated to Belgium in 1911 and attended the Science department of the University of Liège. He graduated as an electrical engineer in 1920.

In 1928 he obtained Belgian citizenship.

== World War 2 ==
In 1940 Guidalevitch had to report himself in the registry of Jews in Antwerp and Wilrijk.

== Photography ==
In 1925 Guidalevitch joined the "Iris" photo club in Antwerp.

From 1932 his works started appearing in exhibitions and publications. However, it wasn't until 1950 that he was recognized as an important photographer.

Victor Guidalevitch developed most of his photographs himself and had no commercial ambition, so there are very few prints available and they have become quite collectible.

== Exhibitions ==
- 2009: First Doubt: Optical Confusion in Modern Photography, Selections from the Collection of Allan Chasanoff, Yale University Art Gallery (USA). Artwork exhibited: Stagnation.
- 2015: The Road, Robert Koch Gallery, San Francisco (USA). Artwork exhibited: Street Scene.
- 2017: Les mystères de la chambre noire: Photographic Surrealism, 1920–1950, UBU Gallery, New York (USA). Artwork exhibited: Roi soldat.
- 2019: Street Life, Robert Koch Gallery, San Francisco (USA). Artwork exhibited: Street Scene.

== Collections ==
Victor Guidalevitch's work is held in the following public collections:

- Art Institute of Chicago: Relief
- Houston Museum of Fine Arts: I Think, Therefore I am, Lighter and Stagnation
- Smithsonian American Art Museum: Unidentified Boxer 1 and Unidentified Boxer 2
- Worcester Art Museum (WAM): Man descending stairs
