= Carl Verbraeken =

Belgian composer

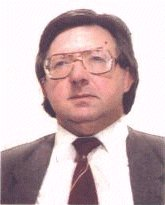
Carl Verbraeken

Carl Gustav Verbraeken (born 18 September 1950 in Wilrijk, Belgium) is a Belgian composer.

Verbraeken studied at the Royal Conservatory of Brussels. He wrote more than 1000 works, including piano music, chamber music and orchestral works. From 2010 until 2023, he was president of the Union of Belgian Composers.
