= Marcia De Wachter =

Marcia De Wachter (born Wilrijk, 9 October 1953) is a Belgian economist who is a Director of the National Bank of Belgium (NBB). She was appointed Director (Honorary Vice-Governor) of the NBB on 1 March 1999 for a first term of 6 years, which was renewed on 1 March 2005 for a second term of six years. She is an advisor of the Itinera Institute. Marcia De Wachter is married to Leo Steenbergen, CFO of Telenet.

== Education ==
She graduated in Applied Economics at the University of Antwerp (Universitaire Faculteiten St.-Ignatius Antwerpen – UFSIA) in 1975. In 1979, she obtained a Master of Arts in economics at the University of Chicago and a PhD in Applied Economics at the UFSIA in 1983.

== Career ==
In October 1975, she started her career as a scientific assistant at the UFSIA until September 1977. From October 1979 until July 1988 she worked as a scientific assistant at UFSIA-SESO. From April 1984 until July 1985, she worked as scientific assistant at the Universiteit van Amsterdam (UvA). From 1984 until July 1988 she was part-time lecturer at UFSIA.

From March 1986 until June 1988 Marcia De Wachter was Economic Advisor in the Socio-economic Cabinet of Belgian Prime Minister Wilfried Martens and Coordinator from July 1988 until March 1990.

She started her career at the NBB in April 1990, where she would be Spokesperson for the National Bank of Belgium until February 1994. From January 1991 until October 1996, she acted as Department Advisor at the Cabinet of Alfons Verplaetse Governor of the NBB after which she became Secretary-General of the Bank from 1 November 1996 until 26 February 1999. On 1 March 1999 she became Vice-Governor of the NBB which she would remain until 3 August 2003. On 4 August 2003, she became Honorary Vice-Governor of the NBB. In 2003 she was Belgium's candidate for a place on the board of the European Central Bank, but was not selected.

De Wachter was the author of an influential 2007 report into the state of the Belgian economy, of which she is an advocate of liberalisation, especially in the ICT sector.

== Awards ==
- 1970: Stichting Socutera Prize
- 1975: E. Casteleyn and Cl. Jussiant Prize awarded by the Belgian Chamber of Commerce
- 1977: Fellowship of the Belgian American Educational Foundation
- 1979: Hillman Award of the University of Chicago
- 1981: Stichting Randstad Prize
- 2002: Alumnus of the Year Award UFSIA 2002 on the occasion of the 150th anniversary of UFSIA
