= Het Steen =

Fortress in Antwerp, Belgium

Coordinates: 51.2227°N 4.3974°E

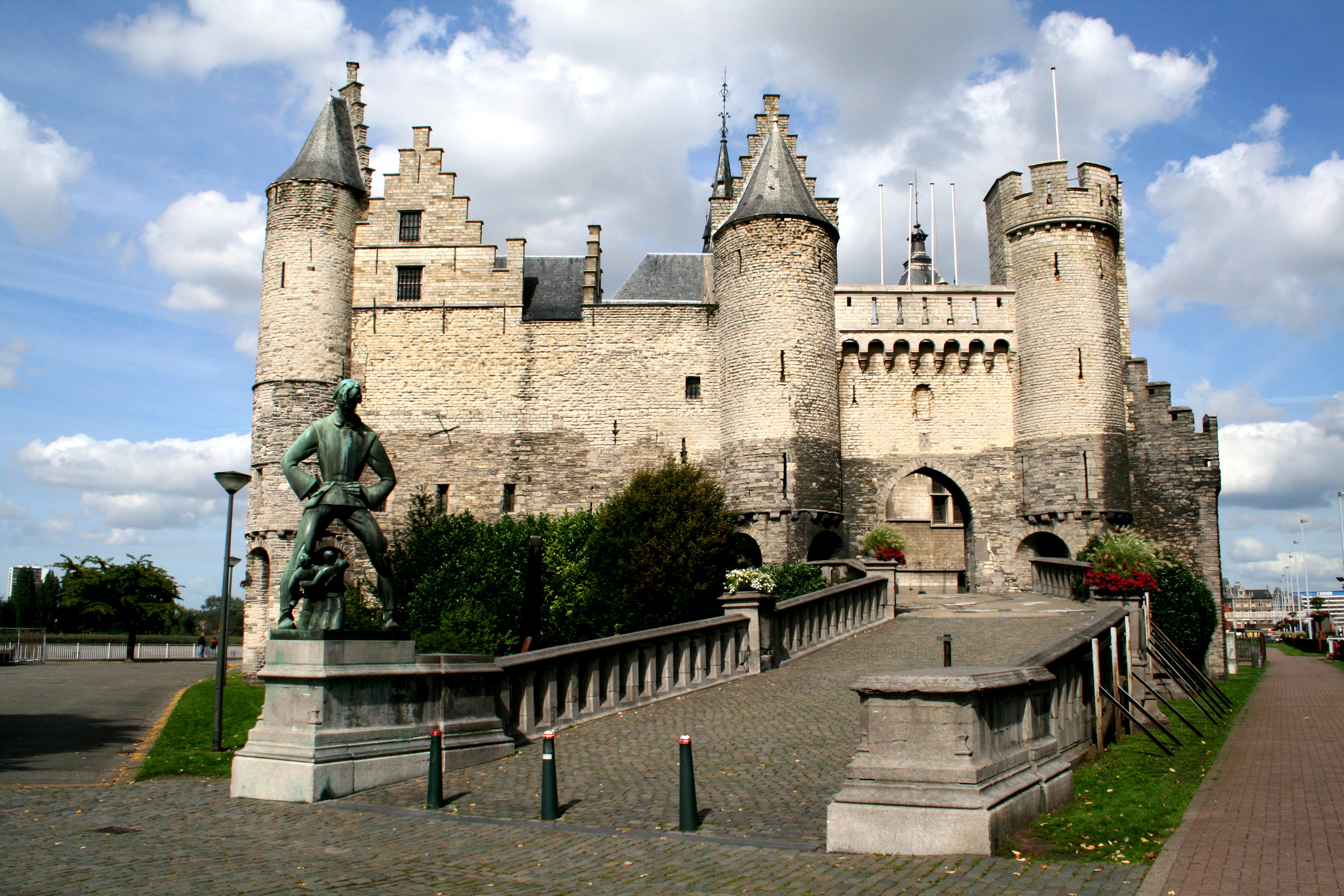
Het Steen, Antwerp, Belgium

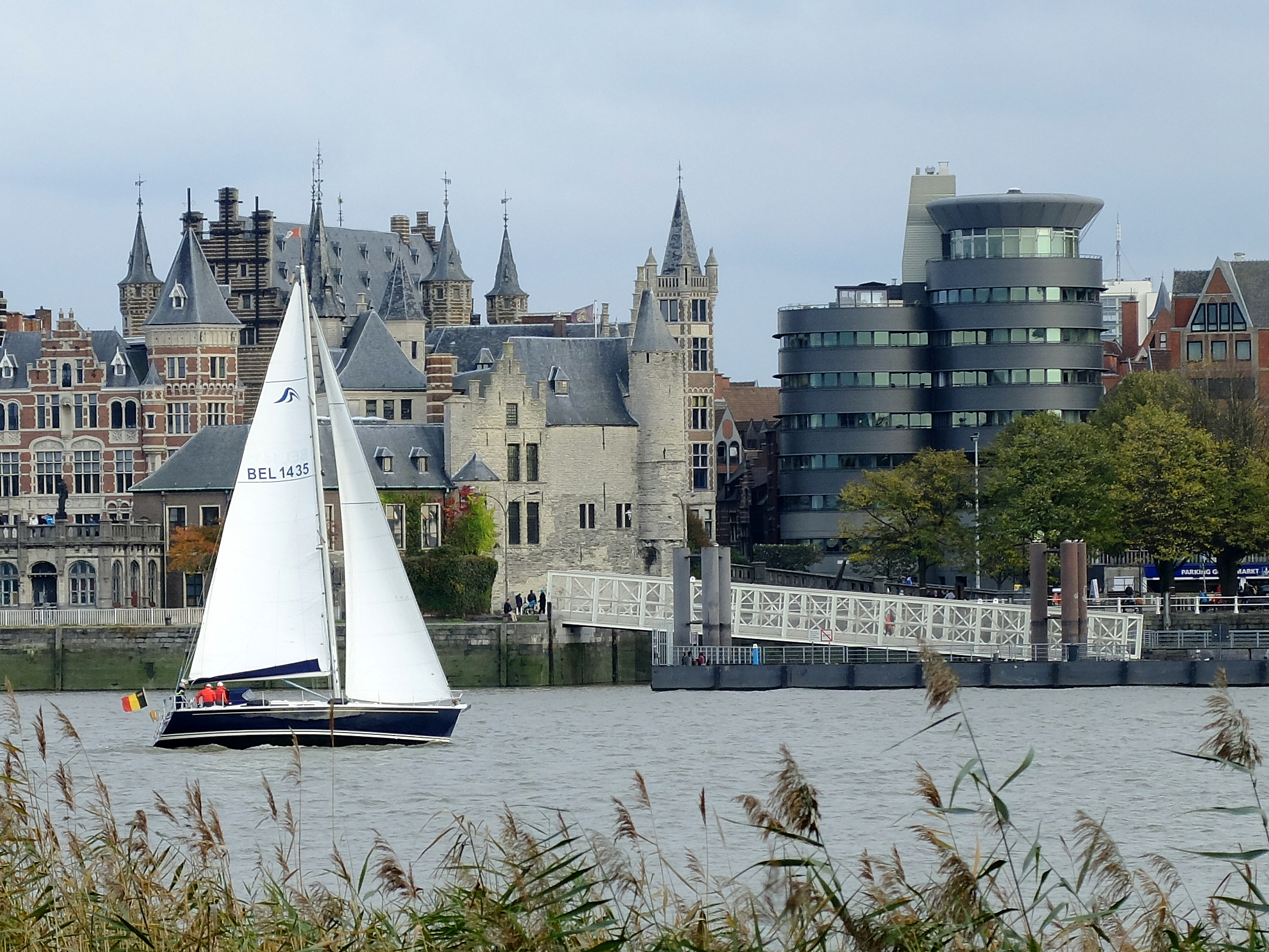
The castle from the Scheldt river

Het Steen is a medieval fortress in the old city centre of Antwerp, Belgium, one of Europe's biggest ports. The surviving structure was built between 1200 and 1225 as a gateway to a larger castle of the Dukes of Brabant which was demolished in the 19th century. As the first stone fortification (city wall) of Antwerp, Het Steen is Antwerp's oldest building and used to be part of its oldest urban centre. The words "Het Steen", translated from Dutch mean "the rock" in English, although that is not the equivalent etymological meaning.

== History ==
The first documented mention of Antwerp (fortified) city dates back to the 12th century. However, there was a settlement and a castle (donjon) here as early as the Carolingian period in the 9th century. The first fortifications may have been built after the Viking incursions in the early Middle Ages; in 879 the Normans invaded Flanders. The Margraviate of Antwerp came into being around 974. The Duchy of Lower Lotharingia was part of the Holy Roman Empire, while on the opposite bank of the Scheldt lay the county of Flanders, which was subordinate to the king of France. From 1076 to 1100 Godfrey of Bouillon was the Margrave of Antwerp. Godfrey I, Count of Louvain, received the duchy in 1106. His great-grandson was Henry I, Duke of Brabant who received the Duchy of Brabant in 1183.

Previously known as Antwerpen Burcht (fortress), the walled city of which the only visible remains are parts of the first stone fortification wall and house Het Steen. The building, which was built against the fortification wall and adjacent to the south city gate, gained its current name in around 1520, after significant rebuilding under Charles V. The rebuilding led to its being known first as "'s Heeren Steen" (the King's stone castle), and later simply as "Het Steen" (the stone castle). The Dutch word "steen" means "stone", and used to be used for "fortress" or "palace", as in the "Gravensteen" in Ghent, Belgium.

The fortress made it possible to control the access to the Scheldt, the adjacent river.

The house Het Steen was later used as the "schepenbank" (Alderman's house or city hall) and "vierschaar" (court of justice). It was used as a prison between 1303 and 1827.

== Modern use ==
The largest part of the fortress, including dozens of historic houses and the oldest church of the city, was demolished in the 19th century when the quays were straightened to stop the silting up of the Scheldt. The remaining building, heavily changed, contains a shipping museum, with some old canal barges displayed on the quay outside.

In 1890 Het Steen became the museum of archaeology and in 1952 an annex was added to house the museum of Antwerp maritime history, which in 2011 moved to the nearby Museum Aan de Stroom. Here is also a war memorial to the Canadian soldiers in World War II.

At the entrance to Het Steen is a bas-relief of Semini, above the archway, around 2nd century. Semini is the Scandinavian God of youth and fertility (with symbolic phallus). A historical plaque near Het Steen explains that women of the town appealed to Semini when they desired children; the god was reviled by later religious clergy. Inhabitants of Antwerp previously referred to themselves as "children of Semini". An organization concerned with the historic preservation of Het Steen and Semini, Antwerp Komitee Semini in Ere (AKSIE), formed in 1986, holds annual celebrations at Het Steen as cultural events.

At the entrance bridge to the castle is a statue of a giant and two humans. It depicts the giant Lange Wapper who used to terrorise the inhabitants of the city in medieval times.

A major renovation of Het Steen was completed in October 2021, when it reopened as a visitor center with a modern concrete extension.

== In popular culture ==
Richard Wagner's opera Lohengrin, which premiered in 1850, is set in Antwerp Castle around the year 933 under the reign of Henry the Fowler, with Elsa von Brabant as the main female protagonist and the swan knight Lohengrin, who magically appears on the river on a barge pulled by a swan when the king holds court hearing on the bank. Ludwig II of Bavaria had Neuschwanstein Castle designed by stage designers in 1869; its narrow rectangular inner courtyard is designed according to Wagner's stage directions for Antwerp Castle, with Elsa's wing on the left including the covered balcony on which she stands at the beginning of the second act.

== Gallery ==
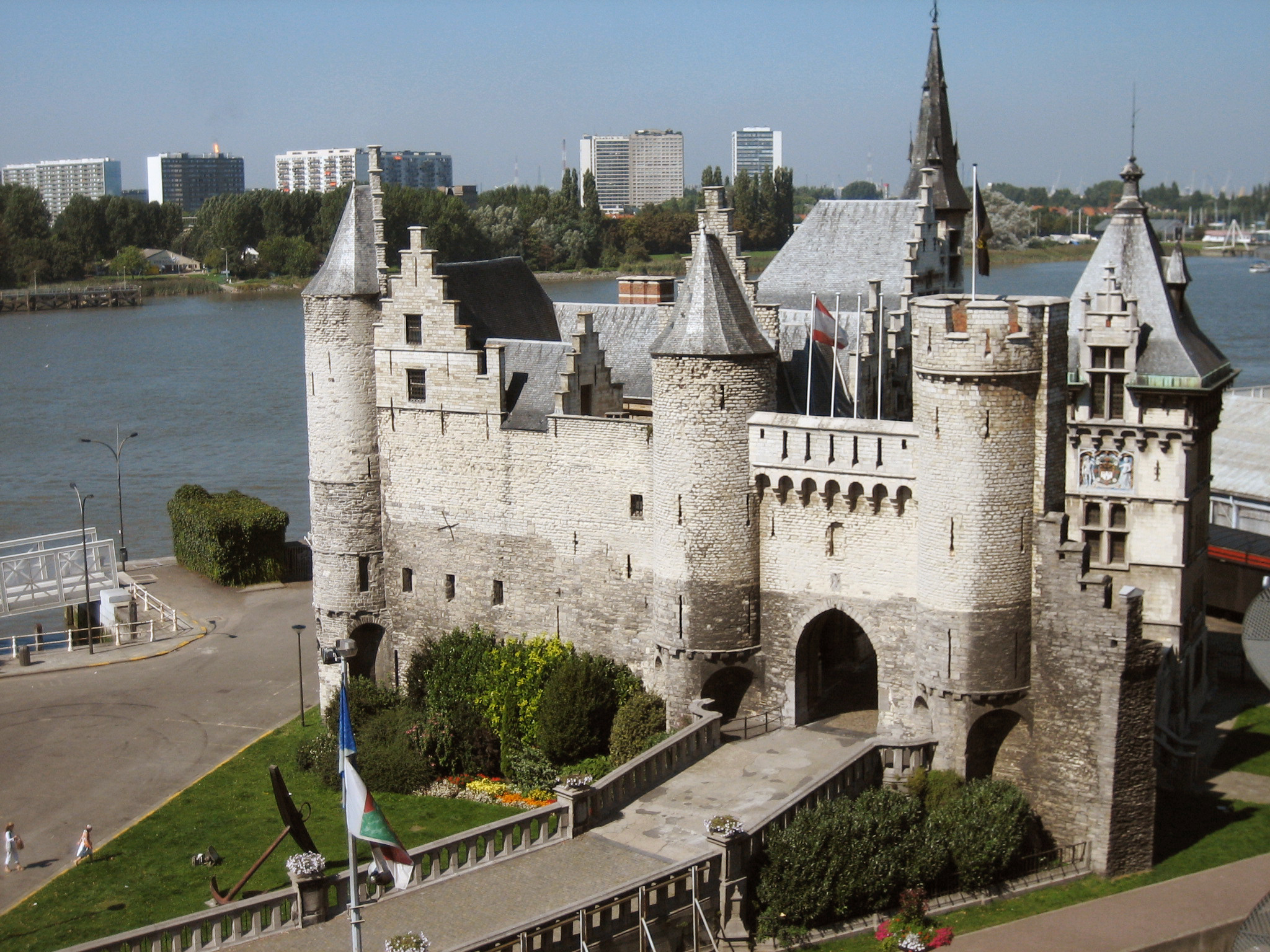

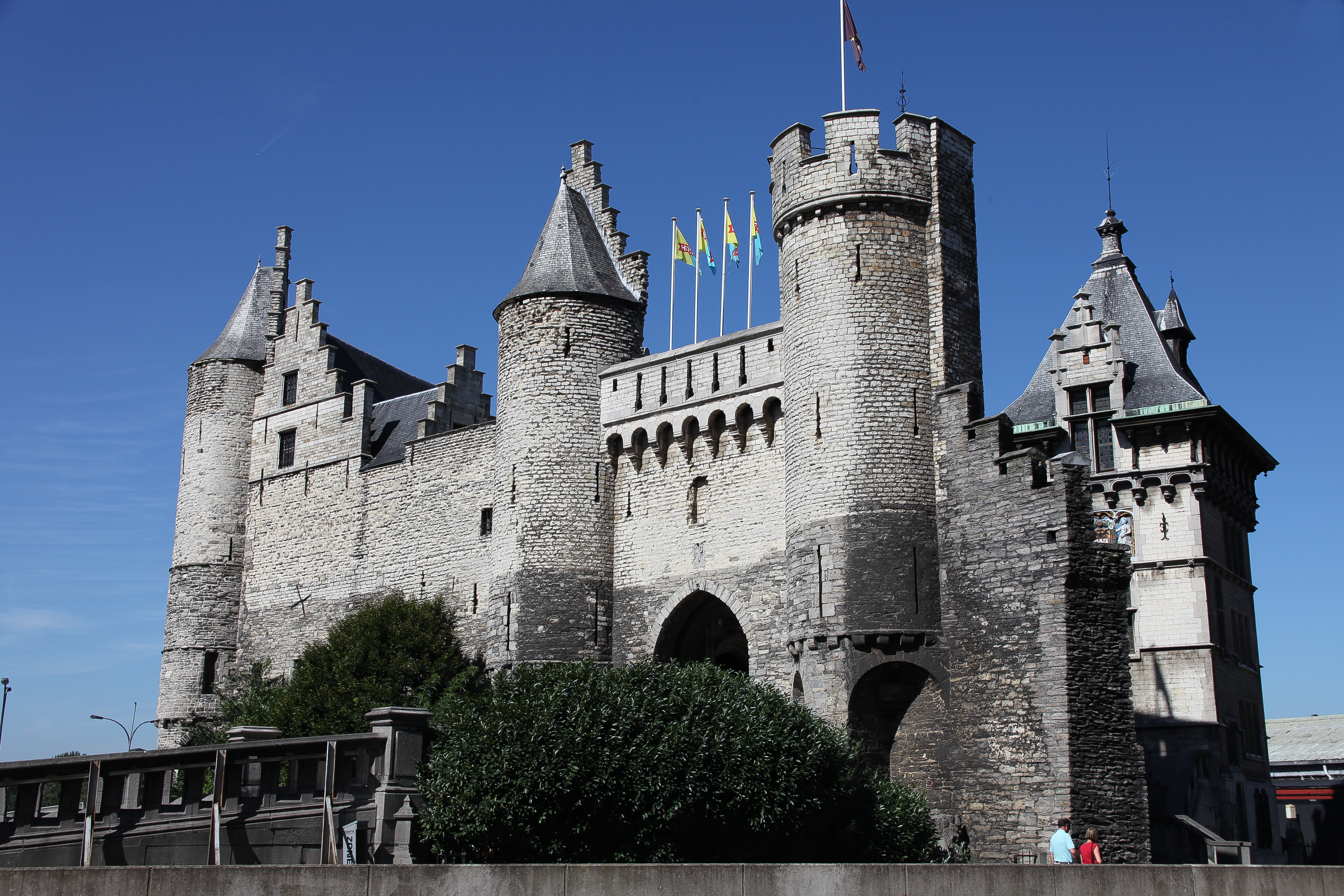

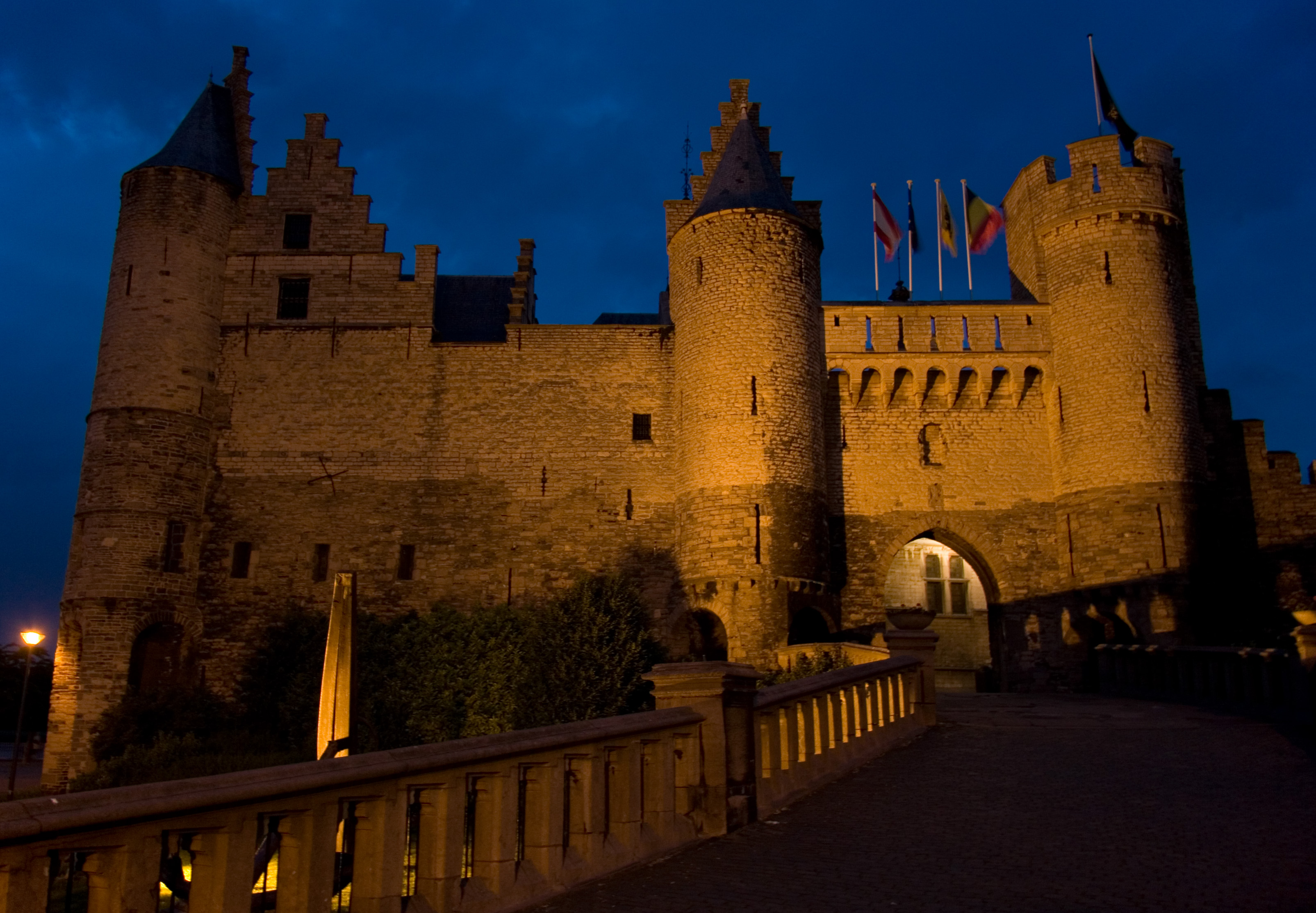

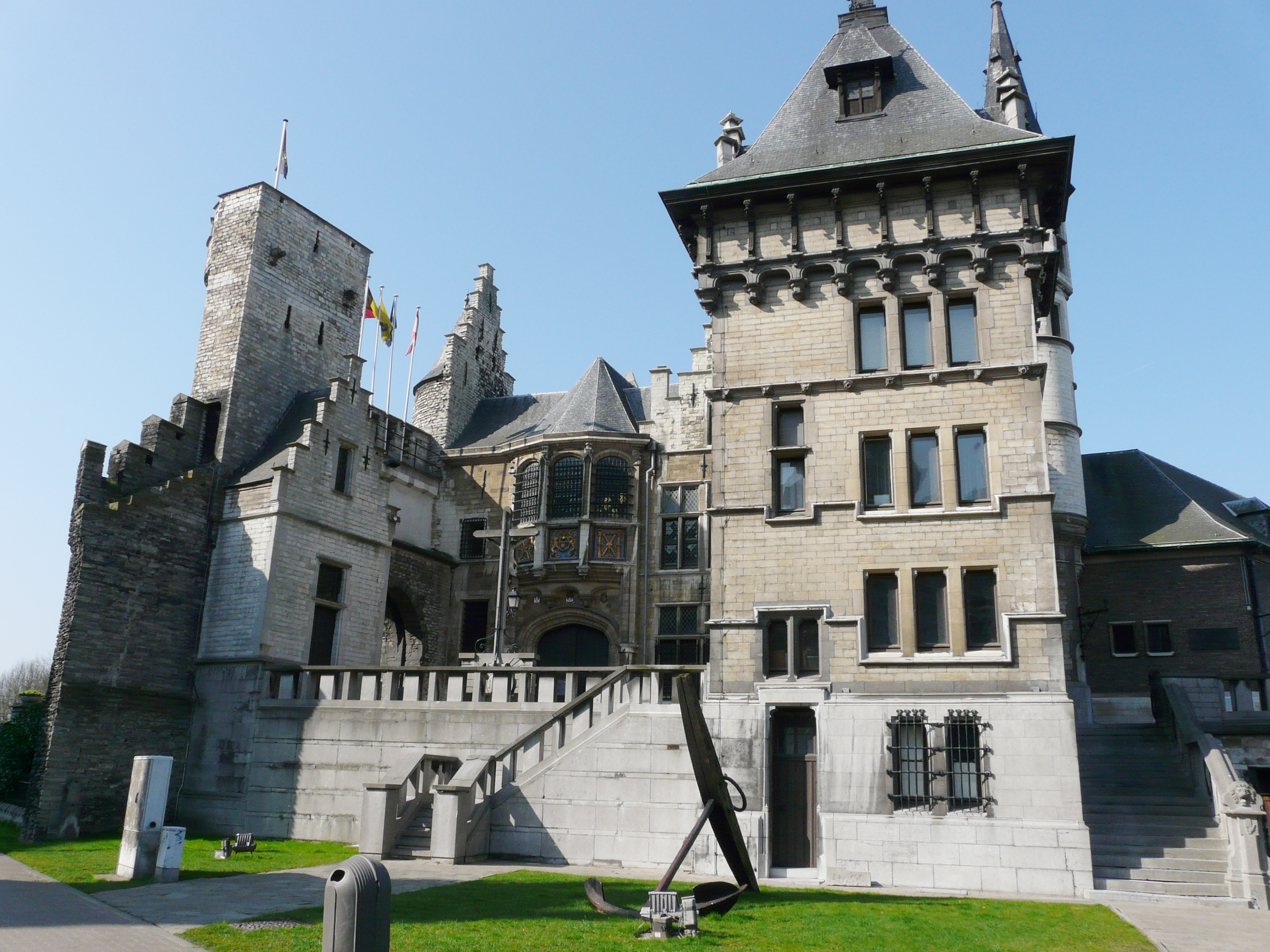

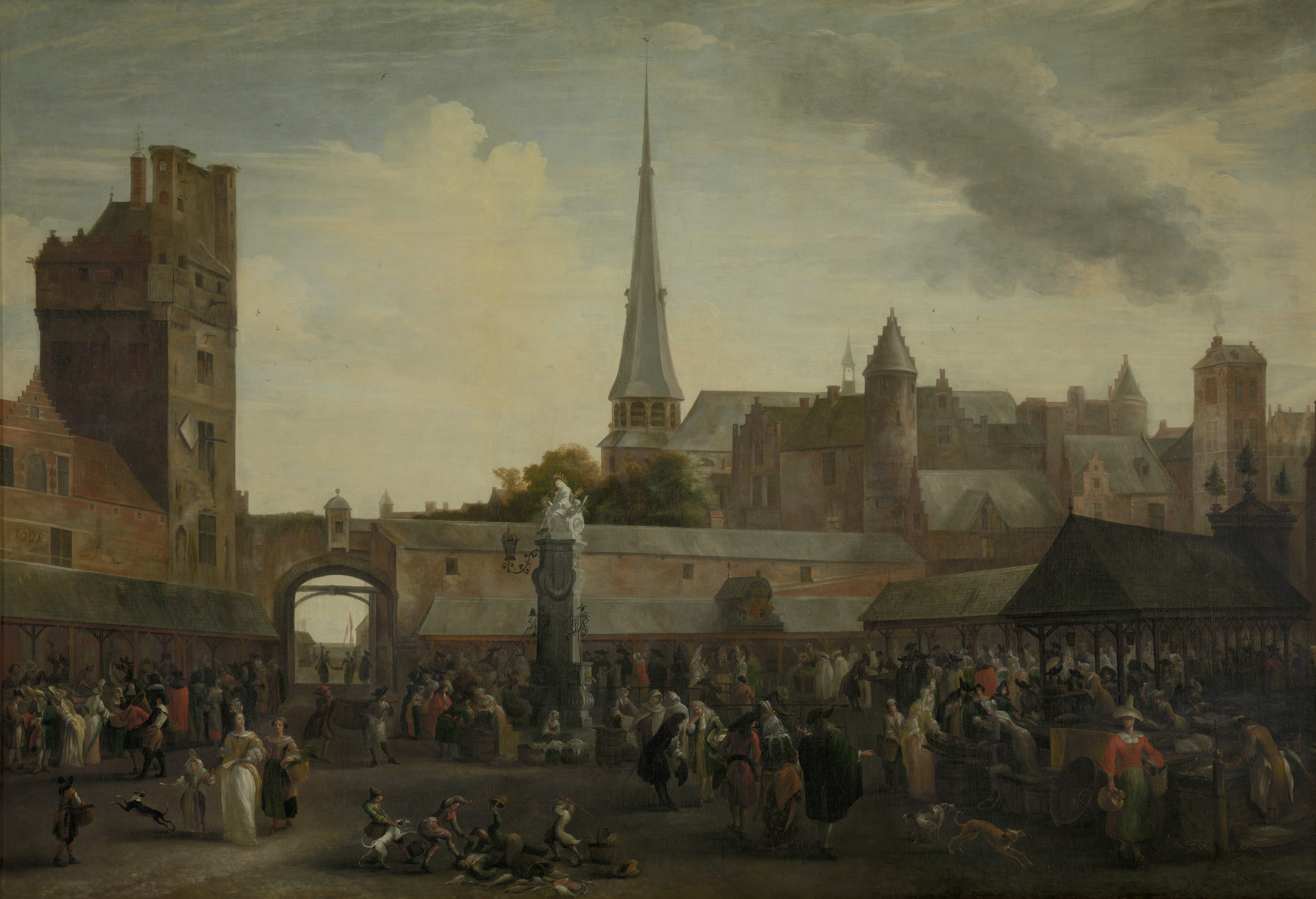
Painting of fish market near Het Steen (1695)

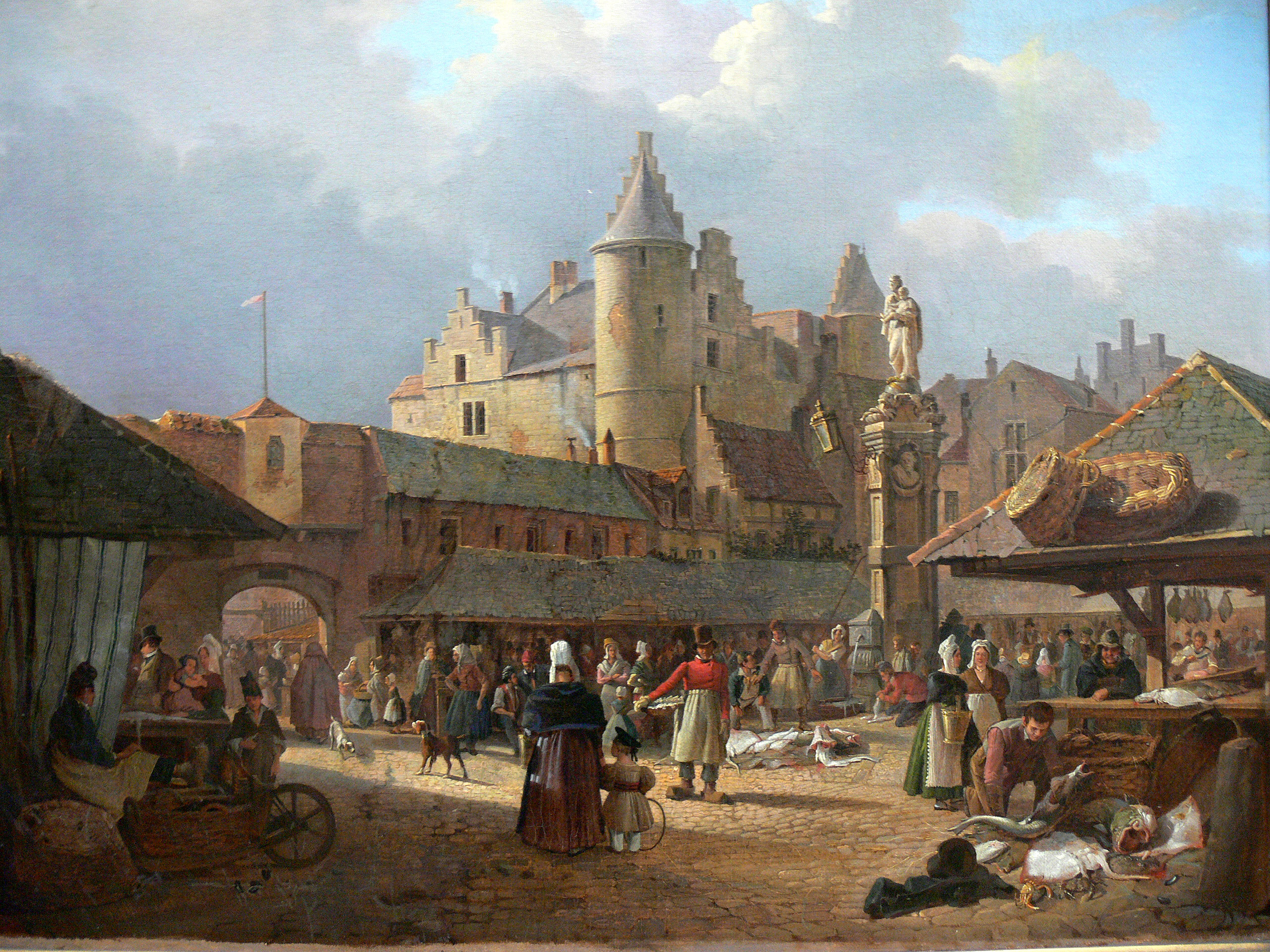
Painting of fish market near Het Steen (1833)

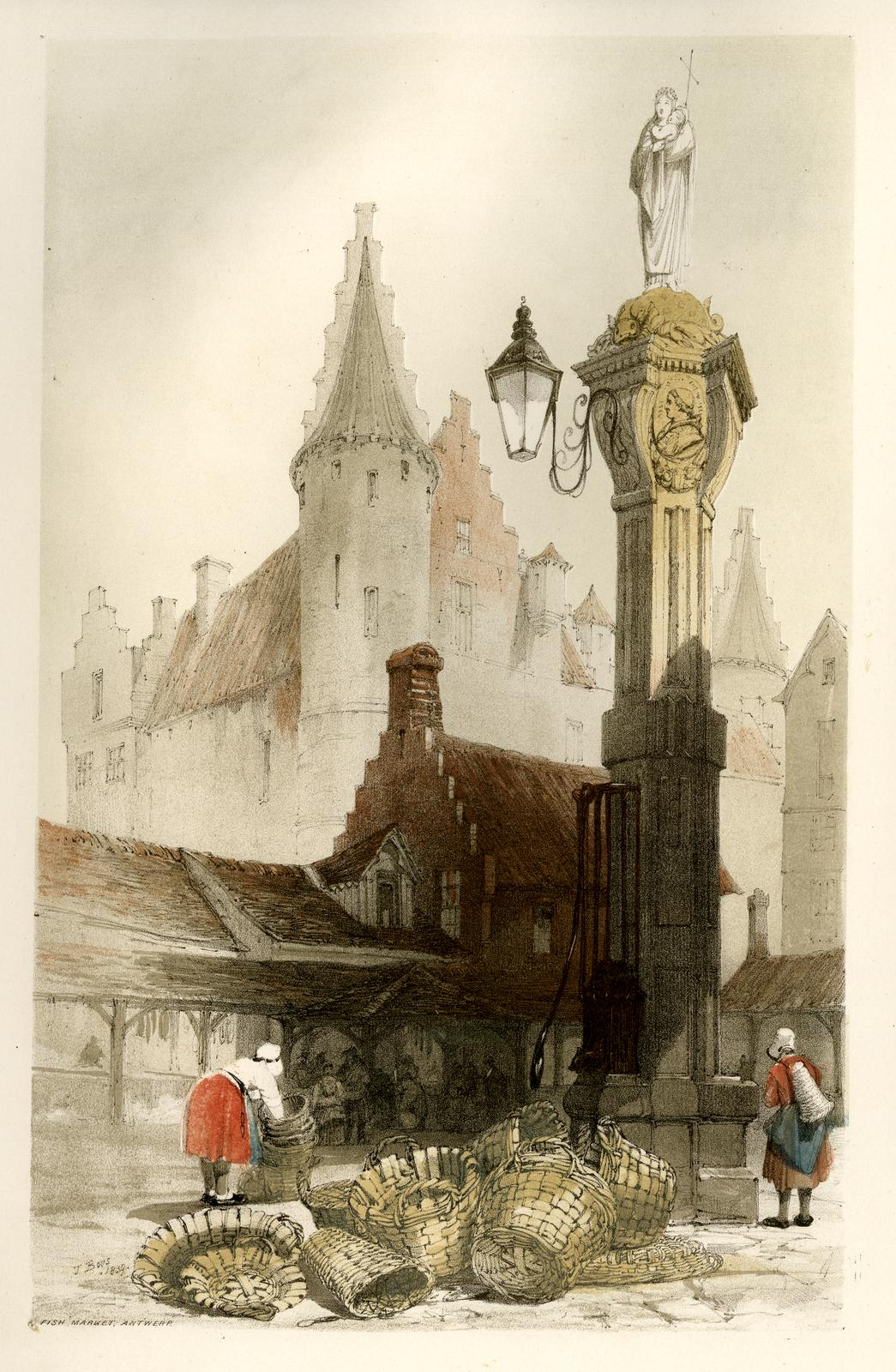
Drawing of fish market near Het Steen (1839)
