= Gabriel Fehervari =

Belgian businessman (born 1960)

- Born: 1960 (age 65–66); Wilrijk
- Education: Graduated in law at the University of Antwerp; Katholieke Universiteit Leuven
- Occupation: Businessman

Gabriel Fehervari (born Wilrijk, 1960) is a Belgian businessman and was the CEO of the former Alfacam Group, which consisted of three divisions: Alfacam, Euro1080 and Eurolinx. Alfacam was declared bankrupt on 19 April 2013. He is the son of Hungarian immigrants. His former company, with its headquarters in the Eurocam Media Center in Lint (Belgium), had diversified into multimedia television services, TV channels in high definition and wireless TV services. His father was a Hungarian refugee who fled Eastern Europe after the Hungarian Revolution of 1956 and settled in Hoboken near Antwerp.

== Education ==
He graduated in law at the University of Antwerp (UFSIA) and the Katholieke Universiteit Leuven (KUL). In addition he took a postgraduate course in audiovisual communication at the KUL.

== Career ==
In 1985, he started a video business in Antwerp. At the first edition of the Night of the Proms in the Sportpaleis in Antwerp he directed the video images of the event. Since then he continued to record this yearly event. In 1999 he delivered the infrastructure for the transmission of the Eurovision Song Contest in Israel. In 2002 he provided a video transmission car for the 2002 Winter Olympics in Salt Lake City and video recordings at the FIFA World Cup. He has been present on several events since then. In 2004 he founded Euro1080.

== Sources ==
- Gabriel Fehervari (IMDB)
- The nominees for the Vlerick Award (2008)
