= Astra 3B =

Communications satellite

- Mission type: Communications
- Operator: SES S.A.
- COSPAR ID: 2010-021A
- SATCAT no.: 36581
- Website: https://www.ses.com/
- Mission duration: 15 years (planned); 15 years, 8 months, 21 days (elapsed)

Spacecraft properties
- Spacecraft type: Eurostar
- Bus: Eurostar-3000
- Manufacturer: Astrium (now Airbus Defence and Space)
- Launch mass: 5,472 kg (12,064 lb)
- Power: 10 kW

Start of mission
- Launch date: 21 May 2010, 22:01 UTC
- Rocket: Ariane 5ECA (V194)
- Launch site: Centre Spatial Guyanais, ELA-3
- Contractor: Arianespace
- Entered service: June 2010

Orbital parameters
- Reference system: Geocentric orbit
- Regime: Geostationary orbit
- Longitude: 23.5° East

Transponders
- Band: 64 transponders: 60 Ku-band; 4 Ka-band
- Bandwidth: 33 and 36 MHz
- Coverage area: Europe, Middle East

Astra 3B is one of the Astra communications satellites owned and operated by SES, launched in 2010 to the Astra 23.5°E orbital position providing digital television and radio for direct-to-home (DTH), and the AstraConnect two-way satellite broadband services across Europe and Asia.

The satellite is also used to provide the one-way Othernet internet access service to Europe that, using small lightweight receiver stations, is designed to eventually provide news, weather, educational and other media to communities with no other access to the internet.

Astra 3B was used by SES to broadcast its first demonstration Ultra-high-definition television (UHDTV) (8K) television signal in May 2018.

In the summer of 2023, Astra 5B was moved from 31.5° East to co-locate with Astra 3B at 23.5°E. Subsequently, Astra 5B was renamed Astra 3C and broadcast channels on Astra 3B began to be transferred, prompting speculation that Astra 3B was reaching the end of its commercial life some two years short of the planned mission duration.

== Satellite description ==
The satellite provides three broadcast beams, of horizontal and vertical polarisation that cover three areas of the Earth's surface. The Pan-European Wide beam provides DTH reception on 60 cm dishes across Europe from Spain to the Black Sea and from Greece to Scandinavia. The European spot beam (for central and eastern Europe) and the Middle East spot beam (the Arabian Peninsula, Iran and Iraq) provide for contribution and distribution services, and data and Internet Protocol (IP) trunking services between the two regions with Ka-band uplink and downlink used in Europe and Ku-band in the Middle East.

== Launch ==
Astra 3B was finally launched on 21 May 2010, at 22:01 UTC, after nearly two months delay caused by technical problems to the main stage pressurization system of the Ariane 5 launch vehicle, including two on-the-launch-pad postponements on 24 March 2010 and 9 April 2010.

== Operations ==
Astra 3B became commercially operational in June 2010 to initially provide DTH broadcast services mainly to the Benelux region and Eastern Europe as well as the two-way broadband service, ASTRA2Connect across Europe and the Middle East. In January 2011, Astra announced that Bulgarian DTH operator Satellite BG would launch a package of more than 60 standard definition channels and 12 high definition channels, including sports, film, factual and children's television, and all major Bulgarian public and commercial services on 1 February 2011, using three transponders on Astra 3B to reach television homes across Bulgaria.

The deployment of Astra 3B helped to optimize the spectrum use at 23.5° East and enabled SES to release the Astra 1E and Astra 1G satellites previously at 23.5° East for use at other orbital positions.

== See also ==
- Astra 23.5°E orbital position
- Astra 3A co-located satellite
- Thor 2 co-located satellite
- SES satellite operator
- Astra satellite family
- SES Broadband two-way satellite broadband
