= Lange Wapper =

Flemish folkloric character

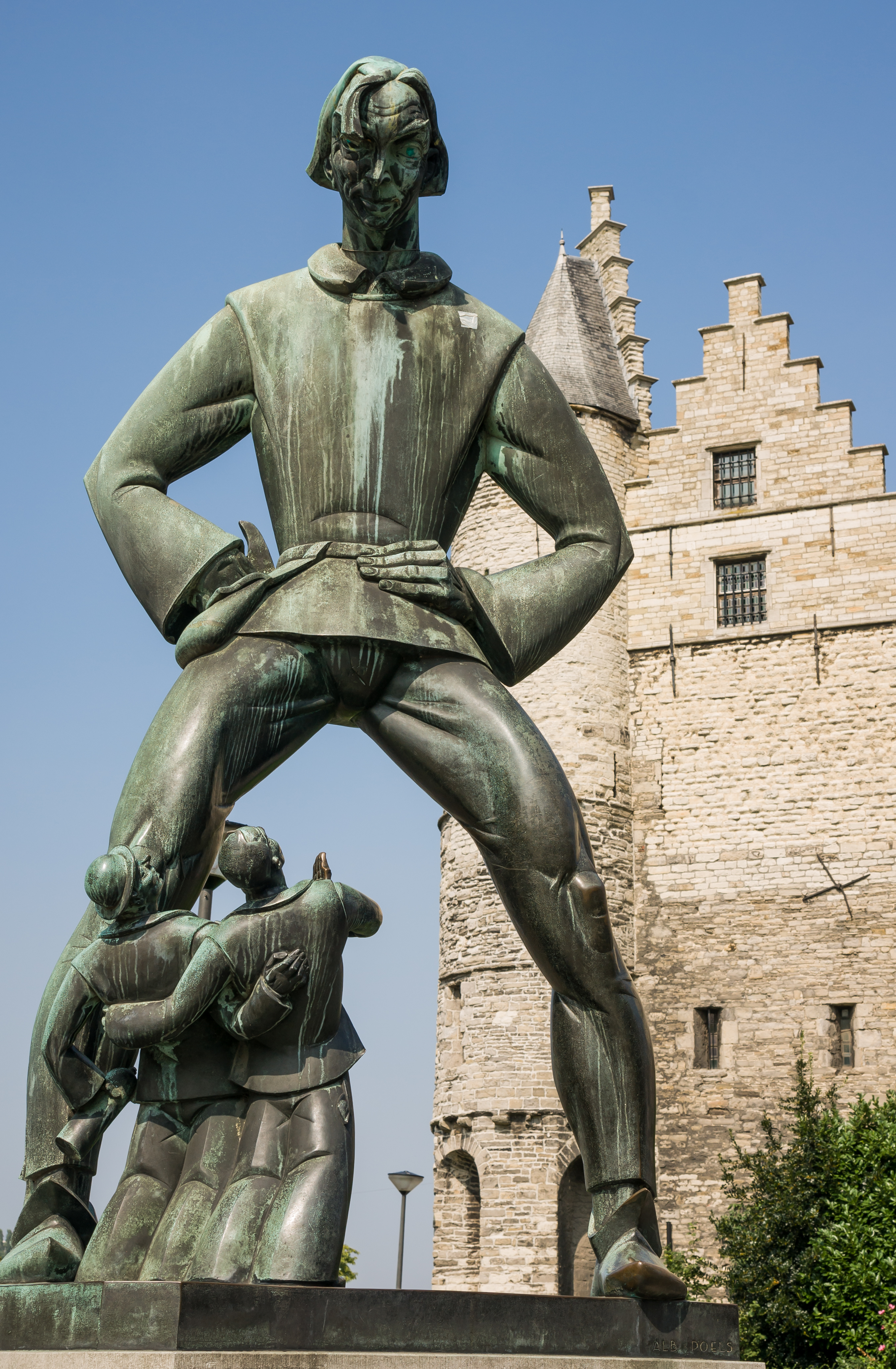
The statue De Lange Wapper in front of castle Het Steen in Antwerp

Lange Wapper is a Flemish folkloric character. He is a legendary giant and trickster whose folk tales were told especially in the city of Antwerp and its neighbouring towns, but similar tales are also prominent in other Flemish cities.

== Origin ==
His origin and character within folklore may be as follows. In a parsley bed, a farmer found a red cabbage that was so big it could not fit in a cauldron. Feeling the vegetable, he found himself stroking the head of a baby. Because he could not care for the child, it was adopted by a family living in Antwerp. The child grew to be a strong, sensible boy who helped those in need. One day he saved an old woman from drowning in the Scheldt river, and she gave him the ability to make himself big or small. Because he preferred to appear in his tall form, he gained the nickname Lange Wapper. He would disguise himself as a child to receive breastmilk to drink, would vex drunkards, and would cheat children in games. His bleating laughter frightened the general public, who began to call him “water devil”.

== Stories ==
In one story, a man sits in an inn in Antwerp. When he goes home, rather drunk, he hears footsteps behind him. He turns to see another man, who stops. When the first man walks faster, the other man speeds up. The first man begins to run, and the other man does too. The first man runs home and hides in bed, only for someone to knock at his window. It is Lange Wapper, as big as a house, who warns, "If you get drunk again, I will break your neck!"

In a second story, children are playing near Steenplein in Antwerp. Suddenly, a rich man approaches and hands out candy. The children follow the man toward Boom, but he suddenly disappears. The only thing the children hear is a devil's laugh. They realize that the man was Lange Wapper.

Another story is about Stans van 't Gansken, a wheedling woman, who hides near a place in Antwerp where mothers abandon their newborn babies. Stans accosts these women and threatens that if they do not give her a large amount of hush money, she will tell everybody else that they abandoned their children. All the women pay her. One day, Stans finds a baby in front of her door. She takes the child, planning to abandon it. Suddenly, the baby turns into a giant—Lange Wapper. He beats Stans, and she is never again seen near the place where children are abandoned.

In a fourth story, a young woman lives near Groenplaats in Antwerp. She has four lovers and boasts that she can handle a fifth. One evening she invites the four lovers one by one to her house. One hour before the first lover arrives, someone knocks at the door; it is a man who introduces himself as her fifth lover and invites her to walk with him. Meanwhile, Lange Wapper hides in the woman's house and uses his shapeshifting ability to assume her form. As her lovers arrive, he assigns them different tasks: the first is sent to a cemetery to sit under a big cross, the second is sent to lie in a coffin under the cross, the third is sent to knock on the coffin until someone turns up, and the fourth is sent to walk around the cross with a large chain. Later, the four men and the woman die: The first man is scared to death when the second man crawls into the coffin. The second man is scared to death when the third one knocks on the coffin. The third dies of fright at the noise of the chain, thinking that the noise is made by the devil. The fourth man runs to the house of the woman, who is home from her walk, to tell his story. The woman is so scared that she dies of a stroke. The fourth man is driven insane and drowns himself in the river Scheldt. The fifth man is revealed to be an assistant of Lange Wapper.

== In Flemish culture ==
- A planned but delayed controversial new bridge in Antwerp would have been called the Lange Wapper bridge.
- There is a statue of Lange Wapper in front of Het Steen in Antwerp.
- The giant appears in the Belgian comic series Spike and Suzy (Suske en Wiske), namely the album De Zwarte Madam (1947).
