= Robert Janssens =

Belgian composer and conductor (born 1939)

Robert Janssens (born 1939) is a Belgian composer and conductor. He is a French-speaking member of the Union of Belgian Composers, one of whose essential missions is "to disseminate the orchestral production of our compositions".

Janssens studied at the Royal Conservatory of Liège and Brussels. He initially taught at the École Normale in Brussels. He later became Professor of Orchestra Conducting at the Brussels Conservatory and Director of the Brussels Academy of Music and the Conservatoire royal de Mons. He is the founder and president of the Brussels Summer Festival, which regularly presents works by contemporary Belgian composers.

Janssens mainly composed works for large orchestra, including a piano and cello concerto and the ballet Yerma, premiered by the Ballet royal de Wallonie, but also piano works and several string quartets. Among his religious works, the Mass of the artistes is particularly noteworthy, as is the Requiem, which was celebrated with standing ovations at its premiere in Brussels in 2004.

He is the permanent conductor of the Ensemble symphonique de Bruxelles.

== Works ==
- Quatre impromptus for piano, 1977
- Les marionnettes de Toone for orchestra, 1978
- Conversations for flute, clarinet, oboe and bassoon, 1981
- Narcisse to a text by Frederika Blanka for voice and orchestra without piano, 1981
- Le chant du pou for flute, 1982
- Le Messe des artistes, dite de St François for soprano, women choir and orchestra, 1982
- Prélude et fugues for organ, 1983
- Concertino for clarinet and piano or strings, 1984
- Concertino per fagotto for bassoon and orchestra or piano, 1987
- Hommage à Ravel for piano, 1987
- Silver Trio for flute, violin and cello, 1987
- Les chemins de la liberté for two pianos, 1988
- Les sonates de l'Abbaye for chamber orchestra, 1988
- Trio for flute, violin and viola, 1988
- Toy toy for piano, 1990
- Mutatis mutandis for cello, double bass or viola and piano, 1991
- Utinam for piano, 1991
- Concerto n°2 for piano or violin and orchestra or violin and piano, 1992
- Zodia, 1992
- Disneyland for clarinet and piano, 1992
- Sonate "facile" for clarinet and piano, 1992
- Yerma, ballet, 1992, 1996
- Voyage au pays sonore... for alto saxophone, percussion, accordion, piano and synthesizer, 1993
- Sonatine for recorder and harpsichord, 1994
- Thème et variations for flute and guitar, 1994
- String quartet n°1, 1999
- Concerto for cello and orchestra, 2001
- String quartet n°2, 2004
- Requiem for mixed choir and orchestra, 2004
- String quartet n°3, 2005
- Kid Soon for soprano, choir and orchestra, 2005
- Trio à clavier, 2005
- Trio for violin, viola and cello, 2005
- Kyrie? Allo? for soprano, baritone, women's and children's choir and orchestra, 2006
- Vidimus Stellam for mixed choir, organ and orchestra, 2007
