= DFS Kopernikus-3 =

- Names: Deutscher Fernmelde Satellit-3; Hellas Sat 1
- Mission type: Communications
- Operator: Deutsche Bundespost → Deutsche Telekom / Hellas Sat
- COSPAR ID: 1992-066A
- SATCAT no.: 22175
- Website: https://www.telekom.com/en
- Mission duration: 10 years (planned); 10 years 4 months (achieved)

Spacecraft properties
- Bus: GESAT-Bus
- Manufacturer: MBB; Dornier Systems; Siemens; ANT Nachrichtentechnik; Standard Elektrik Lorenz
- Launch mass: 1,415 kg (3,120 lb)
- Dry mass: 850 kg (1,870 lb)
- Power: 1.5 kW

Start of mission
- Launch date: 12 October 1992, 09:47:00 UTC
- Rocket: Delta II 7925 (s/n D215)
- Launch site: Cape Canaveral, LC-17B
- Contractor: McDonnell Douglas
- Entered service: December 1992

End of mission
- Disposal: Graveyard orbit
- Deactivated: February 2003

Orbital parameters
- Reference system: Geocentric orbit
- Regime: Geostationary orbit
- Longitude: 23.5° East (1992–2003)

Transponders
- Band: 11 transponders: 10 Ku-band; 1 Ka-band
- Coverage area: Germany

DFS Kopernikus-3 (or Deutscher Fernmelde Satellit-3 and Hellas Sat 1) was a communications satellite operated by Deutsche Telekom.

== Satellite description ==
The DFS Kopernikus series of satellites debuted in 1989 with the third being launched in 1992. Ordered in 1983 and produced by the GESAT consortium of MBB (flight segment prime contractor), Siemens (overall prime contractor), ANT Nachrichtentechnik (payload), Standard Elektrik Lorenz (digital switching equipment), and Dornier Systems (ground control system), DFS spacecraft are smaller than TV-Sat: on-station mass is 850 kg with a 15.4 m solar array span providing up to 1.5 kW of electrical power. The satellite also used a propulsion system S400.

The communications payload includes ten 14/11-12 GHz transponders with five spares and one experimental 30/20 GHz transponder with one spare. At the end of 1994, DFS 1-3 were stationed at 33.5° East, 28.5° East, and 23.5° East, respectively. Like TV-Sat, the DFS Kopernikus series has been concluded.

== Hellas Sat 1 ==
DFS 3 was leased to the Greek company Hellas Sat in 2002 as a stop-gap measure. It was retired in February 2003.

== Launch ==
DFS-Kopernikus 3 was launched by a Delta II launch vehicle from Cape Canaveral Air Force Station (CCAFS), Florida, United States, at 09:47:00 UTC on 12 October 1992.

== See also ==
- 1992 in spaceflight
