= Union of Belgian Composers =

Union of Belgian Composers (Dutch: Unie van Belgische Componisten - French: Union des Compositeurs Belges) is a Belgian professional organization of composers founded in 1960. It is closely linked to the Belgian copyright society Sabam and the Belgian Music Documentation Centre Cebedem. Its aim is to promote and defend the Belgian composers and their works locally and abroad.

The Union of Belgian Composers is run by a council of twelve composers.

Presidents:

1. 1960 - 1972 : Marcel Poot (1901-1988)

2. 1972 - 1981 : Willem Pelemans (1901-1991)

3. 1981 - 1985 : Max Vandermaesbrugge (1933-2020)

4. 1985 - 1992 : Vic Legley (1915-1994)

5. 1992 - 2010 : Jacques Leduc (composer) (1932-2016)

6. 2010 - : Carl Verbraeken (1950- )

Dutch speaking members~: Marcel De Jonghe, Marc Matthys, Pieter Schuermans, Luc van Hove, Carl Verbraeken and Wilfried Westerlinck.

French speaking members : Danielle Baas, Renier Doutrelepont, Robert Janssens, Viviane Mataigne and Felix Snyers.
