= Euro1080 =

First commercial full-time HD broadcaster in Europe

EXQI, HD1, HD2, HD3, HD5
- Country: Belgium
- Broadcast area: Europe
- Network: Euro1080
- Headquarters: Lint, Belgium

Programming
- Picture format: 1080i

Ownership
- Owner: Alfacam

History
- Launched: 1 January 2004
- Closed: Unknown

A sample picture of the HD1 TV channel

Euro1080 was the first commercial broadcaster in Europe to broadcast full-time high-definition television (HDTV) content. It was founded by Gabriel Fehervari in 2004 and is owned by Alfacam, of which declared bankrupt in 2013.

The name originates from the 1080 lines of vertical resolution in the signal broadcast, which is 1080i50 - 1920 x 1080 at an interlaced frame rate of 50 Hz. The signal uses Dolby Digital 5.1 sound.

The headquarters and studios are located in Belgium at the Eurocam Media Center. The parent company of Euro1080 is the Belgium-based Alfacam Group.

Euro1080 began broadcasting on 1 January 2004 from the Astra 1H satellite at 19.2° east and was free to air during its first few months. Thereafter, a €200 conditional access card was required to watch the flagship channel HD1.

In addition to HD1, whose content is primarily HDTV showcasing for regular users, a second channel was soon created, HD2 focusing on live and recorded HDTV broadcasts of special event for selected theatres. Euro1080 currently broadcasts HD1 and HD3 on the following satellite:

- Eutelsat W3A at 7°E, 10.880 MHz, DVB-S2, QPSK, Symbol rate 13.333 Mbit/s, Vertical, FEC 4/5, MPEG4.

It is also possible to receive it from a growing number of cable operators.

Two channels have been temporarily removed recently:

- HD2 (previously HDevents or Hde): broadcasts premium events in pay-per-view.
- HD5 (timesharing with HD2): promotional channel, broadcasting a six-minute informative video about HDTV and what Euro1080 is, as well a brief glimpse of the previous day's footage.

A new channel was launched in 2008:

- HD3: Culture with music. (HD1 then became a sports channel.)

In October 2005, HD1 and HD2 simulcast in both MPEG-4 and MPEG-2. This dual encoding lasted until 2007.

Telenet, the main cable operator in Flanders, confirmed as part of its launch announcement of "Telenet Digital TV" on 16 June 2005 that it would sell HDTV set-top-boxes from June 2006.

Since July 2005, the cable operator Integan has broadcast HDTV in the outskirts of the city of Antwerp, in partnership with Euro1080.

On 1 October 2006 Euro1080 started a new digital culture channel named EXQI. The first target audience was the Flemish and Dutch market, but the channel has expansion plans to more than 10 channels for the major European countries.

On 7 January 2007 Euro1080 switched to MPEG-4 AVC for its satellite broadcasts. MPEG-2 broadcasts for HD1 were switched off on 1 January 2008.
