= Astra 1G =

Astra communications satellite

- Mission type: Communications
- Operator: SES
- COSPAR ID: 1997-076A
- SATCAT no.: 25071
- Website: https://www.ses.com/
- Mission duration: Planned: 15 years Final: 25 years and 6 months

Spacecraft properties
- Spacecraft type: Boeing 601HP
- Bus: HS-601HP
- Manufacturer: Hughes Space and Communications
- Launch mass: 3,379 kg (7,449 lb)
- Power: 6 kW

Start of mission
- Launch date: 2 December 1997, 23:10:37 UTC
- Rocket: Proton-K / DM-2M
- Launch site: Baikonur, Site 81/23
- Contractor: Khrunichev State Research and Production Space Center
- Entered service: February 1998

End of mission
- Disposal: Graveyard orbit
- Deactivated: June 2023

Orbital parameters
- Reference system: Geocentric orbit
- Regime: Geostationary orbit
- Longitude: Astra 19.2° East (1997-2009); Astra 23.5° East (2009-2010); Astra 31.5° East (2010-2014); 60° East (2014-2016); 63° East (2016-2017); 51° East (2017-2018); 57° East (2018-2019); 63° East (2019-2021); Astra 19.2° East (2021-2023)

Transponders
- Band: 32 Ku-band
- Coverage area: Europe

Astra 1G was one of the Astra communications satellites owned and operated by SES.

== History ==
SES ordered its Hughes 601HP satellite, in 1994 for Astra 1G.

Astra 1G was retired to a graveyard orbit in 2023.

== Launch ==
Astra-1G was launched on 2 December 1997 at 23:10:37 UTC, by a Proton-K / DM-2M launch vehicle, from Site 81/23 at the Baikonur Cosmodrome in Kazakhstan. It was maneuvered into a geostationary orbit and at 19.2° East of longitude.

== See also ==
- SES (operator)
- Astra (satellite family)
