= Brain Renaissance =

Book by Marco Catani and Stefano Sandrone

- Authors: Marco Catani and Stefano Sandrone
- Original title: Brain Renaissance. From Vesalius to modern neuroscience
- Language: English
- Genre: neuroscience, neuroanatomy, medicine, history of medicine, history of science
- Publisher: Oxford University Press
- Publication date: 4 May 2015
- Publication place: United States
- Media type: Print (Hardback)
- Pages: 304 pp.
- ISBN: 9780199383832 (hardback edition)

Brain Renaissance is a book written by Marco Catani and Stefano Sandrone. It was published on the 500th anniversary of the birth and the 450th anniversary of the death of the anatomist Andreas Vesalius. In 2016 Brain Renaissance won the biennial Award for Outstanding Book in the History of the Neurosciences presented by the International Society for the History of the Neurosciences.

== Synopsis ==
The 304-page book is divided into three parts. The first part deals with the biography of Andreas Vesalius, one of the greatest anatomists of all time. The second parts provides a modern translation from Latin of Vesalius' original book on the brain, namely the seventh book of De Humani Corporis Fabrica. The third part tells a 500-year story behind some of the most important discoveries in neuroscience, while relating the findings of Vesalius with the subsequent development of neuroscience. In these pages the reader becomes familiar with the ebb and flow of many ideas that had a significant impact in the history of neuroscience. At the end of the book the authors have added an appendix with the figures and captions from the seventh book of the Fabrica.

== Reception ==
Alison Abbott dedicated a one-page review to Brain Renaissance in Nature. She underlined that through the translation from the Latin 'we can appreciate Vesalius's extraordinary attention to detail, and his willingness to believe his eyes, even when what he saw contradicted established knowledge' and that the 'accompanying texts by Catani and Sandrone place the work in its historical and scientific context'. Paolo Mazzarello, who reviewed Brain Renaissance in the journal Studies in History and Philosophy of Biological and Biomedical Sciences, wrote that the book is 'a tool to explore the neuroscience from a historical point of view' as well as 'a convincing attempt to use the fundamental discoveries of Andreas Vesalius as a key to start and develop multiple explorations of the brain'. Angela P. Pacheco, while reviewing Brain Renaissance for the British Society for Literature and Science, emphasised that 'Catani and Sandrone have produced a remarkable compilation of the history of neuroscience from Vesalius to the present day' and that this book 'is relevant both to students of medicine, and to those interested in Renaissance studies, medicine, and history.' In PsycCRITIQUES, Gordon M. Burghardt noted that 'Brain Renaissance is even more valuable for those teaching neuroscience in all its guises and at whatever levels, in universities and medical schools. There are lots of lecture tidbits at the very least, helping put our modern conceits as part of a long journey to understand mind and behavior.'

== Bibliography ==
- Marco Catani, Stefano Sandrone (2015). Brain Renaissance. From Vesalius to modern neuroscience. Oxford University Press. ISBN 9780199383832.
