= Medical Renaissance =

Period of medical advances in early modern European history

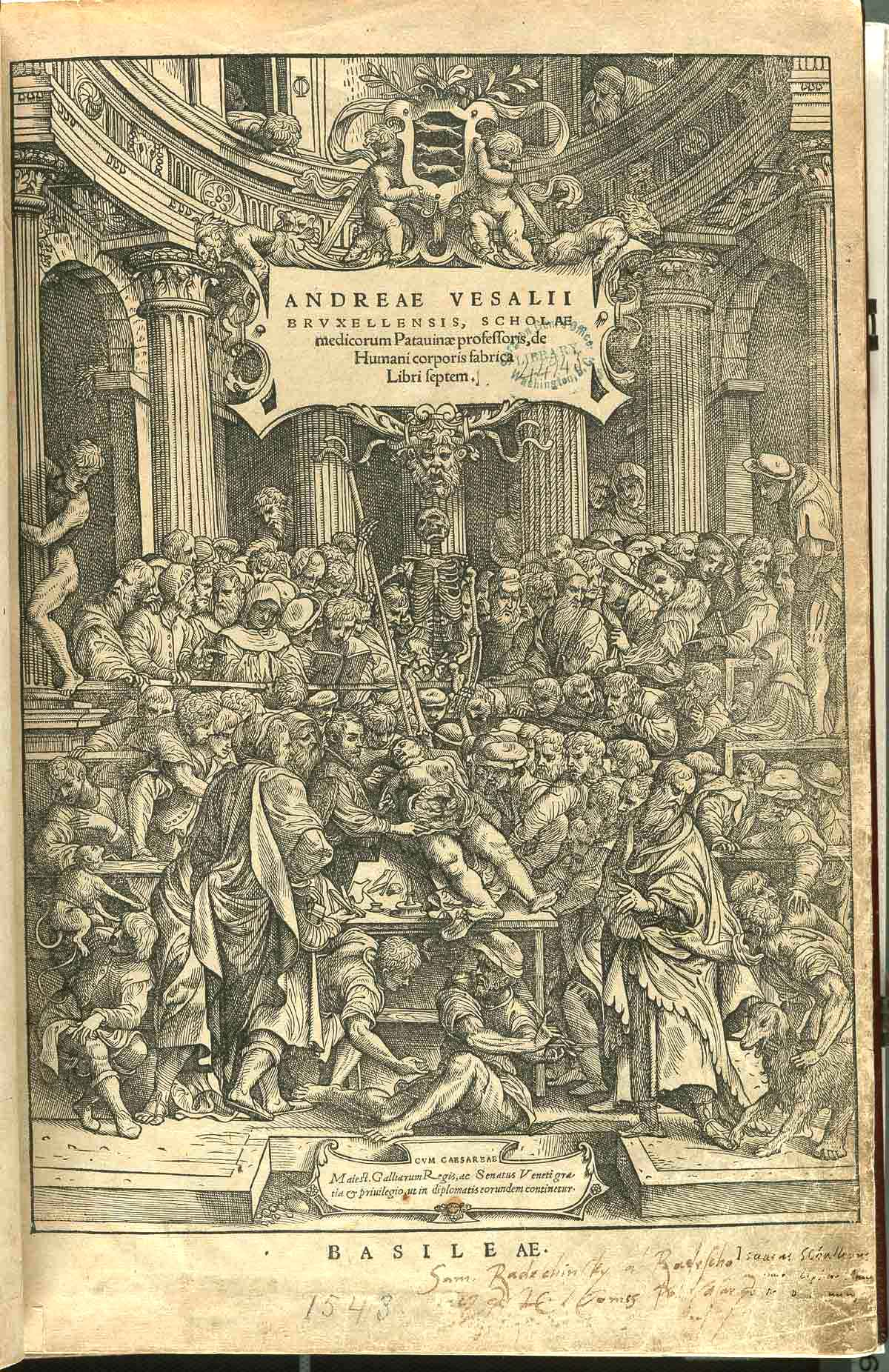
The front cover illustration of De Humani Corporis Fabrica, On the Fabric of the Human Body, written by Andreas Vesalius, showing a public dissection being carried out by Vesalius himself.

The Medical Renaissance, from around 1400 to 1700, was a period of progress in European medical knowledge, with renewed interest in the ideas of the ancient Greek and Roman civilizations, following the translation into Medieval Latin of many works from these societies. Medical discoveries during the Medical Renaissance are credited with paving the way for modern medicine.

== Background ==
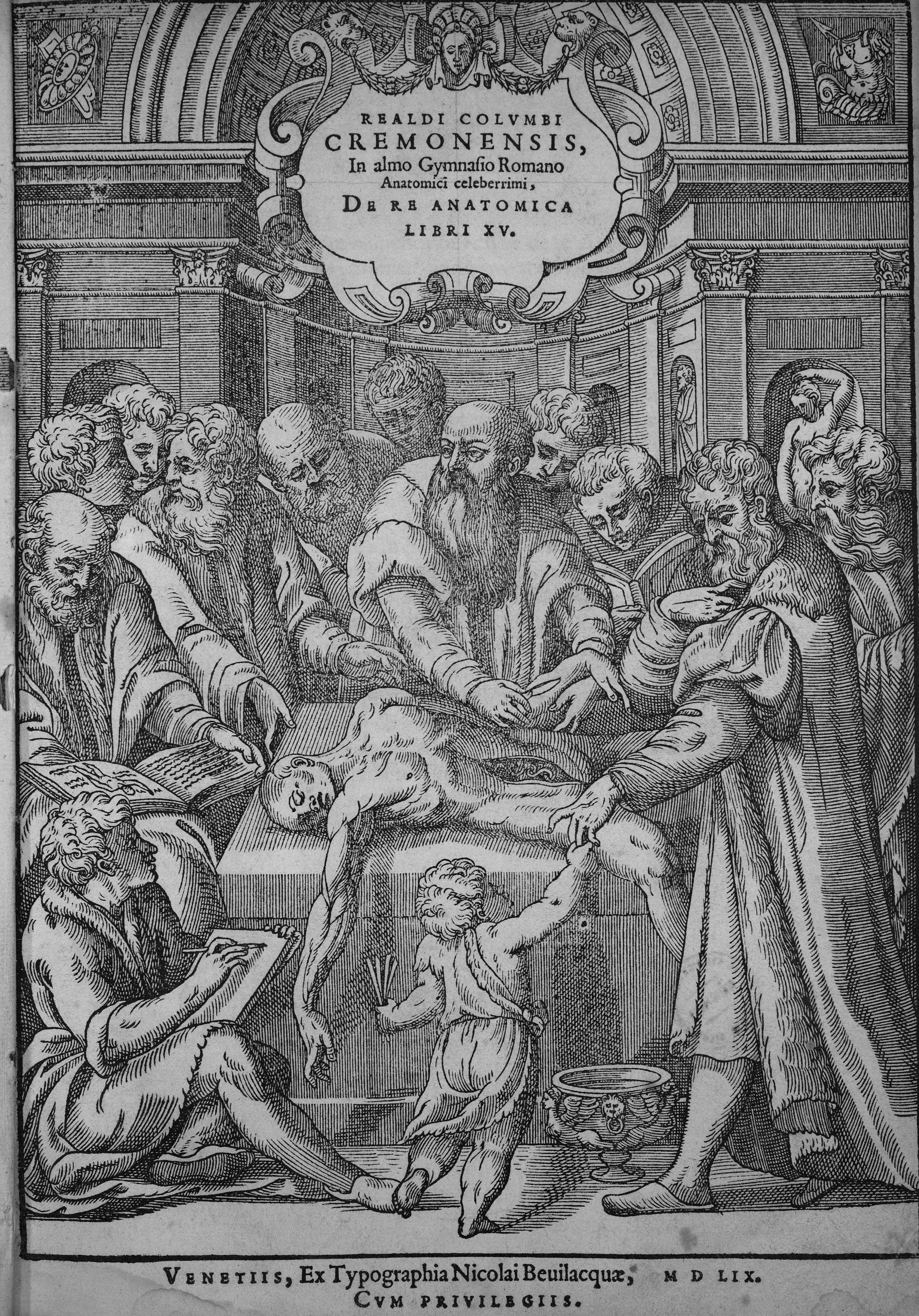
De Re Anatomica by Realdo Colombo, 1572

The Medical Renaissance began in the early 16th century. Medical researchers continued their Renaissance-evoked practices into the late 17th century. Progress made during the Medical Renaissance depended on several factors. Printed books based on movable type, adopted in Europe from the middle of the 15th century, allowed the diffusion of medical ideas and anatomical diagrams. Linacre, Erasmus, Leonicello and Sylvius are among the list of the first scholars most credited for the starting of the Medical Renaissance. Following after is Andreas Vesalius's publication of De humani corporis fabrica (On the Fabric of the Human body) in 1543. Better knowledge of the original writings of Galen in particular, developed into the learned medicine tradition through the more open attitudes of Renaissance humanism. Religious control of the teachings of the medical profession and universities diminished, and dissection was more often possible.

== Notable contributors ==
=== Leonardo da Vinci (1452–1519) ===
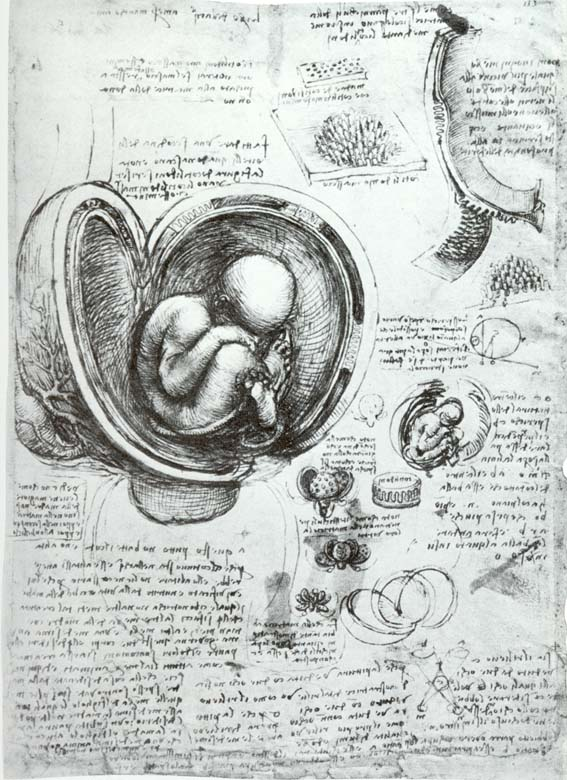
This drawing by Leonardo da Vinci of a foetus in the womb is one of many detailed anatomical drawings by the artist

Leonardo da Vinci made many contributions in the fields of science and technology. His research centered around his desire to learn more about how the human brain processes visual and sensory information and how that connects to the soul. Though his artwork was widely observed before, some of his original research was not made public until the 20th century. Some of da Vinci's research involved studying vision. He believed that visual information entered the body through the eye, then continued by sending nerve impulses through the optic nerve, and eventually reaching the soul. Da Vinci subscribed to the ancient notion that the soul was housed in the brain.

He did research on the role of the spinal cord in humans by studying frogs. He noted that as soon as the frogs' medulla of the spine is broken, the frog would die. This led him to believe that the spine is the basis for the sense of touch, cause of movement, and the origin of nerves. As a result of his studies on the spinal cord, he also came to the conclusion that all peripheral nerves begin from the spinal cord. Da Vinci also did some research on the sense of smell. He is credited with being the first to define the olfactory nerve as one of the cranial nerves.

Leonardo da Vinci made his anatomical sketches based on observing and dissecting 30 cadavers. His sketches were very detailed and included organs, muscles of superior extremity, the hand, and the skull. Leonardo was well known for his three-dimensional drawings. His anatomical drawings were not found until 380 years after his death.

=== Ambroise Paré (1510–1590) ===
Ambroise Paré was a French surgeon, anatomist and an inventor of surgical instruments. He was a military surgeon during the French campaigns in Italy of 1533–36. It was here that, having run out of boiling oil (which was the accepted way of treating firearm wounds), Paré turned to an ancient Roman remedy: turpentine, egg yolk and oil of roses. He applied it to the wounds and found that it relieved pain and sealed the wound effectively. Paré also introduced the ligatures of arteries; silk threads would be used to tie up the arteries of amputated limbs to try to stop the bleeding. As antiseptics had not yet been invented this method led to an increased fatality rate and was abandoned by medical professionals of the time.

Additionally, Paré's contributions extended to the practice of surgical amputation and on the design and development of limb prostheses. While caring for wounded soldiers, Paré recorded the pain endured by amputees, a phenomenon now recognized as phantom limb sensation. He believed that the phantom pain occurred in the brain and not in remnants of the limb.

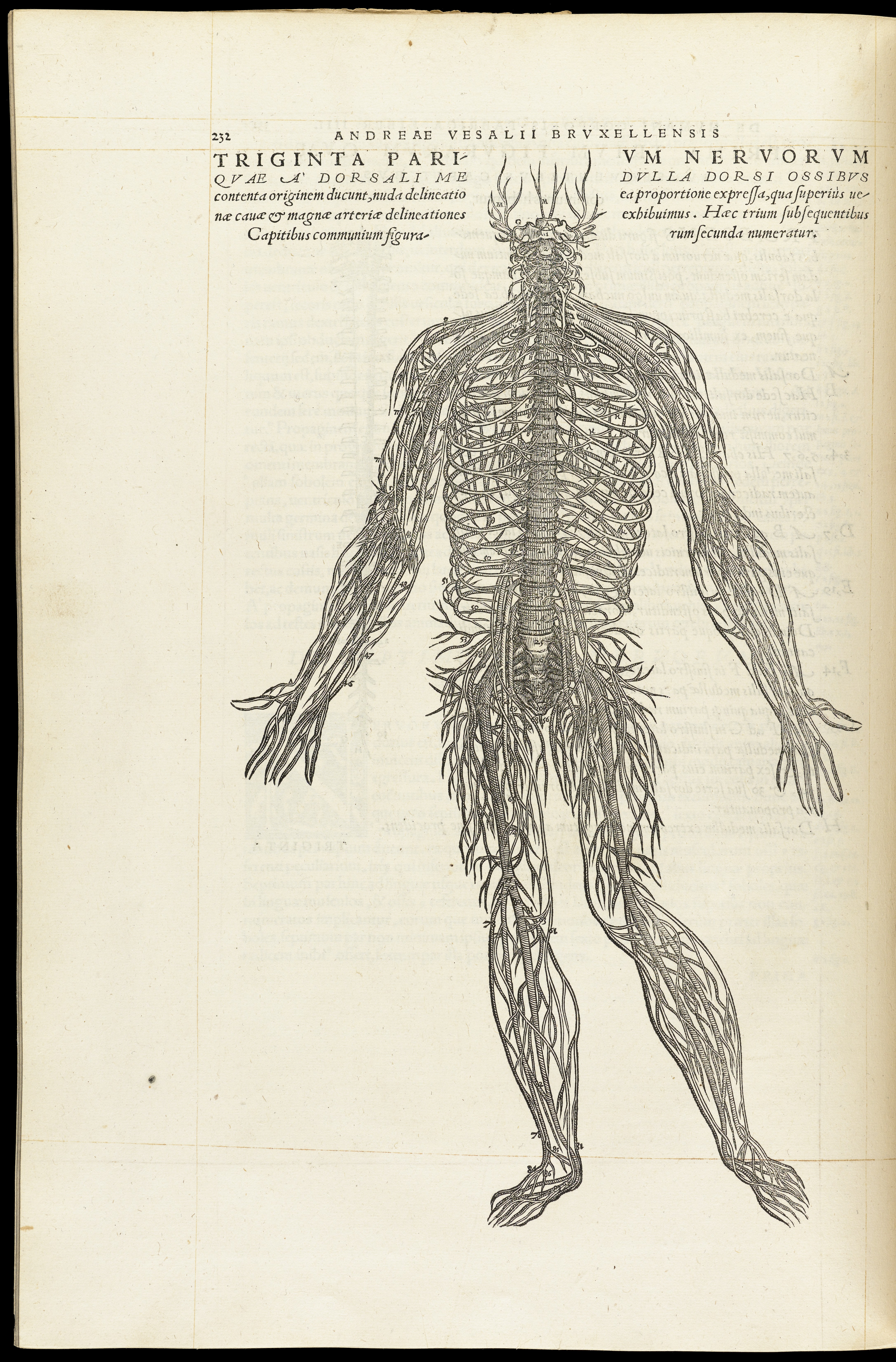
Illustration of the structure of the nervous system from De humani corporis fabrica by Vesalius

=== Andreas Vesalius (1514–1564) ===
Andreas Vesalius was born in 1514 around midnight in Brussels, then part of Habsburg Netherlands, to a long lineage of doctors. His father was also an apothecary to Charles V, Holy Roman Emperor. He would be born into the period of The Revival of Learning. He gained an interest in anatomy at a young age and began dissecting mice, moles, cats, and dogs. Vesalius picked up from the work of Galen (129–c. 200 CE) which was based on the dissection of animals from pigs to apes. The works of Galen would be accepted until Vesalius. He would challenge the medieval views of human anatomy made by Galen that had been taught for centuries. Vesalius paved the foundation of modern anatomy and most of his ideas are accepted today.

Vesalius went to school in Louvain and would enter the university there. His education was majorly taught by Humanistic teachers. Vesalius spent many hours in cemeteries in the burial ground of the Church of the Innocents in Paris to study the bones that were misplaced from improper burial. Eventually, Vesalius and his friend stole one complete skeleton from the gallows; this was the first body Vesalius was able to dissect completely. He would go on to befriend judges and doctors, to gain access to human bodies of those who had just died for dissection. This would start rumors that connected Vesalius to Vivisection. Vesalius did want the most recent deceased cadavers and vivisection was frowned upon both then and currently. Vesalius eventually became a Doctor of Medicine at the age of 22. He noticed that many of his hands on experiences and findings with cadavers contradicted Galen's teachings, to the point he would discarded all them. His students grew to be devoted followers and they would go grave robbing with Vesalius especially if a female was involved.

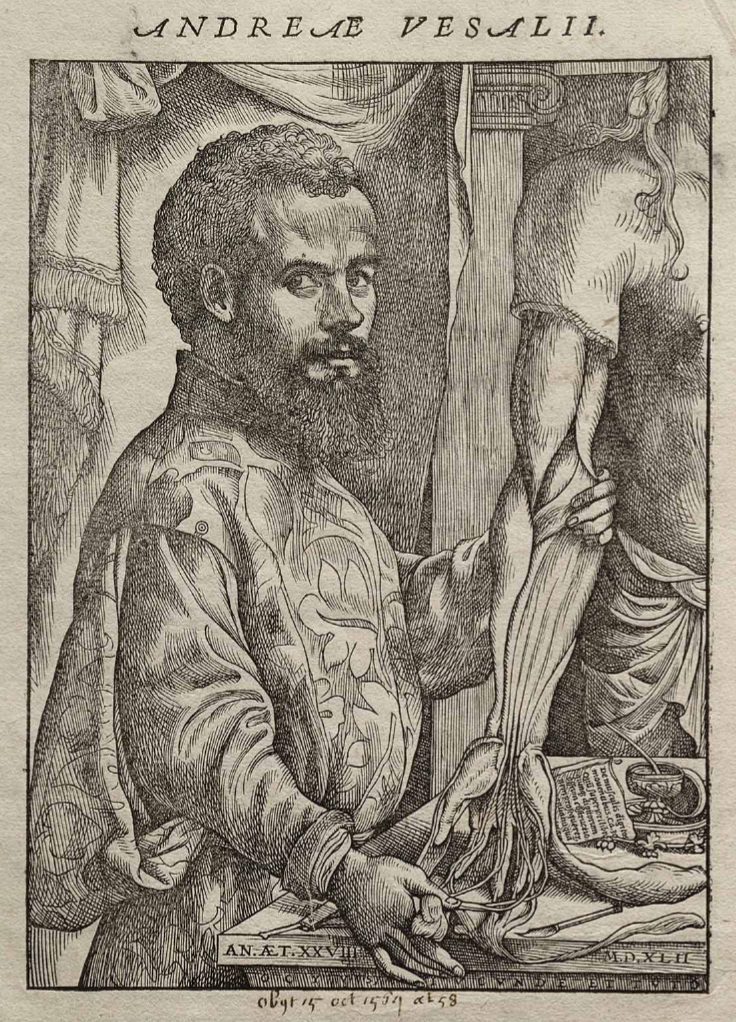
A print portrait of Andreas Vesalius in his book De Humani Corporis Fabrica Libri Septem.

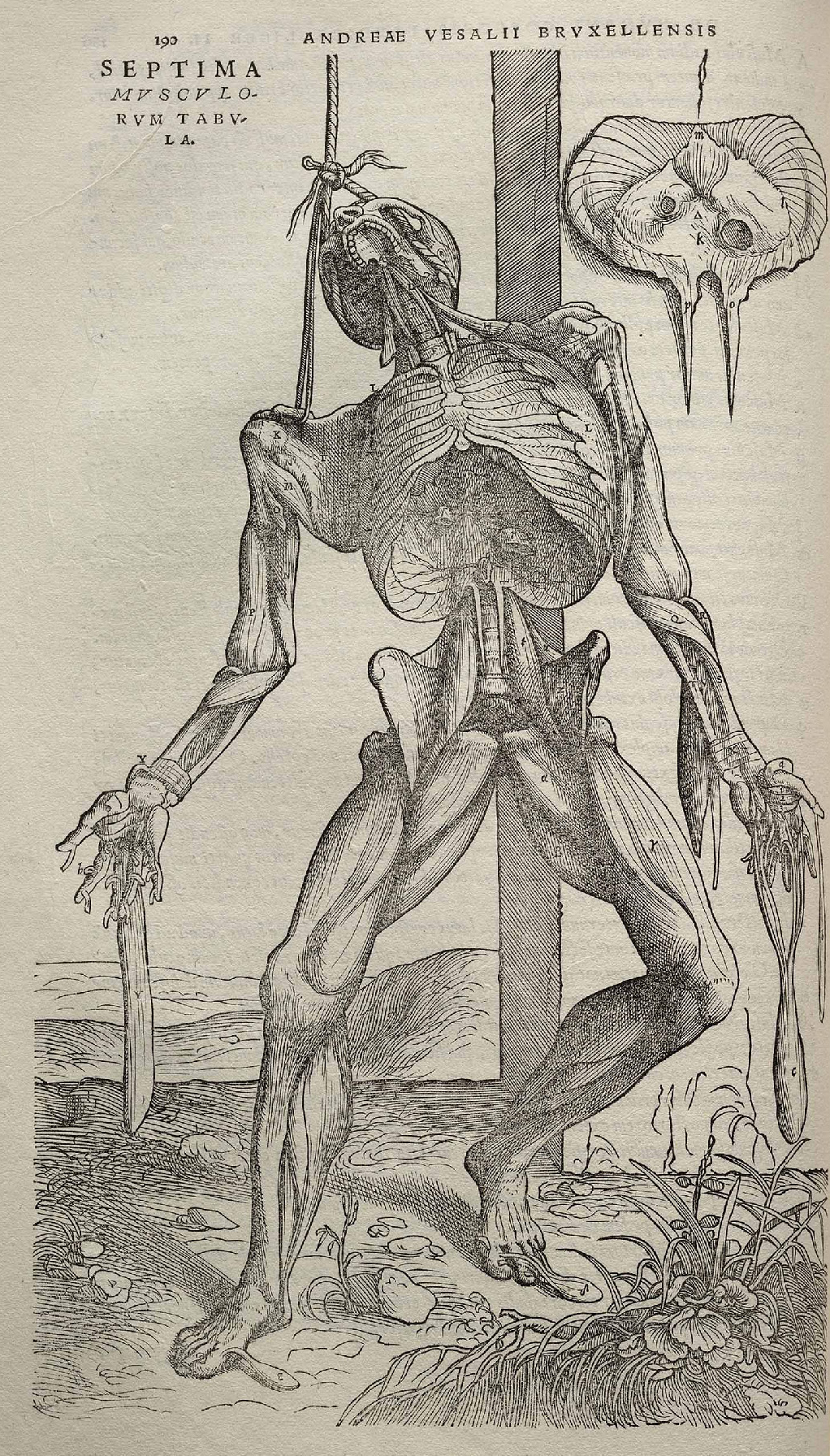
As mentioned, this is one of Vesalius' most known images used in the De Humani Corporis Fabrica that showed parts of the human body.

He wrote his best known book in the year of 1543, De humani corporis fabrica. It was revolutionary because of the accuracy and precision of his descriptions and images of organs and would refute Galen's belief that human anatomy is closely related to apes. The book was a dedication to Charles V, Holy Roman Emperor. Vesalius published De humani corporis fabrica at the age of 28. With him being so young, it made his contributions harder to accept. De Fabrica was a milestone in medical science as it detailed many aspects of the human cadaver as well as presenting it in the form of art. Its imagery drew on new Renaissance methods in art. An example of his work is a picture of a dissected corpse hung by a rope through its eye sockets with the upper diaphragm on a wall behind the corpse. The book gave clear identification of the organs in the human body while also removing the aspects that he found flawed with Galen's teachings.

Vesalius was an important part of the Medical Renaissance. He is remembered as a critic of the inaccurate teachings of Galen, and one of the founders of modern anatomy.

=== William Harvey (1578–1657) ===
William Harvey was an English medical doctor-physicist, known for his contributions in heart and blood movement. William Harvey fully believed all medical knowledge should be universal, and he made this his works goal. Accomplished historians credit him for his boldness in his experimental work and his everlasting eagerness to implement modern practice. Although not the first to propose pulmonary circulation (Ibn al-Nafis, Michael Servetus and Realdo Colombo preceded him), he is credited as the first person in the Western world to give quantitative arguments for the circulation of blood around the body. William Harvey's extensive work on the body's circulation can be found in the written work titles, "The Motu Cordis".This work opens up with clear definitions of anatomy as well as types of anatomy which clearly outlined a universal meaning of these words for various Renaissance physicians. Anatomy, as defined by William Harvey is, "the faculty that by ocular inspection and dissection [grasps] the uses and actions of the parts." In other words, to be able to identify the actions or roles each part of the body plays in the overall function of the body by dissection, followed by visual identification. These were the foundation for the further research on the heart and blood vessels.

=== Hieronymus Fabricius (1537–1619) ===
Hieronymus Fabricius was an anatomist and surgeon that prepared a human and animal anatomy atlas and these illustrations were used in his work, Tabulae Pictae. This work includes illustrations from many different artists and Fabricius is credited for providing a turning point in anatomical illustration. Fabricius' illustrations were of natural size and natural colors. After Fabricius' death, Tabulae Pictae disappeared and wasn't again discovered until 1909. Fabricus focused on the human brain and the fissures that are inside of the brain. In Tabulae Pictae, he described the cerebral fissure that separates the temporal lobe from the frontal lobe. He also studied veins and was the first to discover the valves inside of veins.

== See also ==
- Fracastoro
- Learned medicine
- Paracelsus
