= Jan van Calcar =

German-born Italian painter

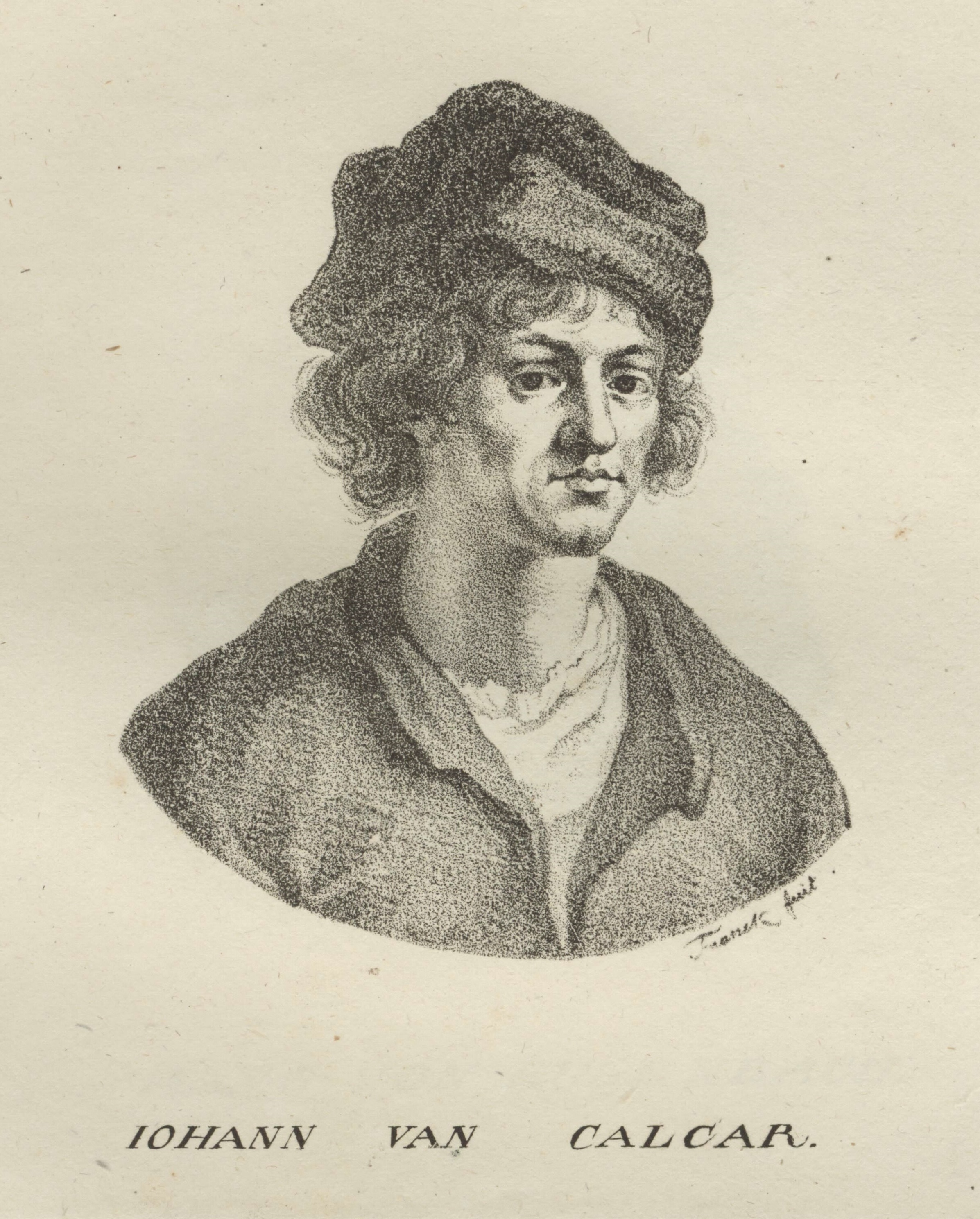
Iohann van Calcar by Maximilian Franck

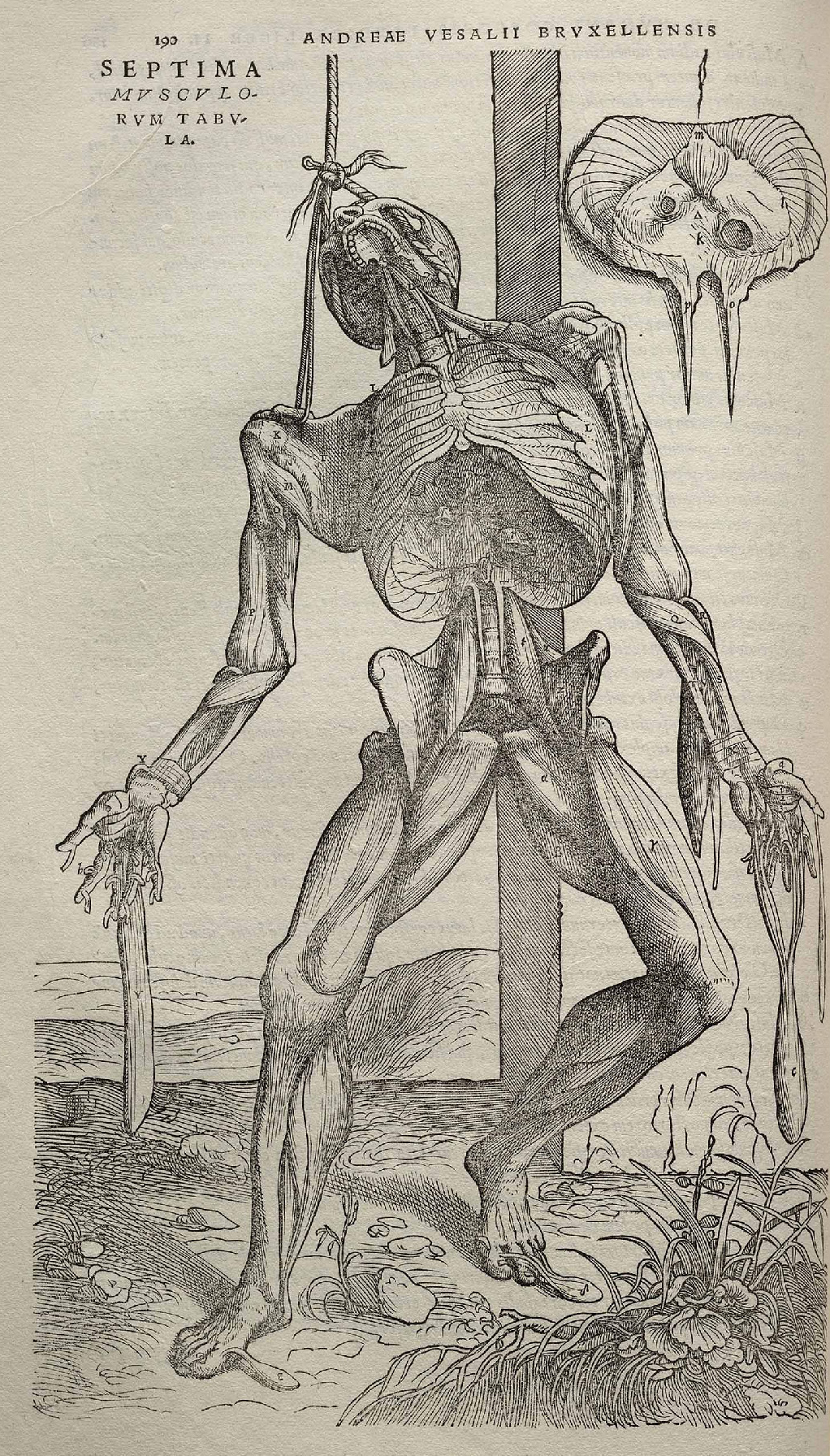
Jan van Calcar is assumed to have been the illustrator of Vesalius's Fabrica which contained many intricately detailed drawings of human dissections, often in allegorical poses.

Jan Steven van Calcar (Italian: Giovanni da Calcar, Latin: Ioannes Stephanus Calcarensis) (c. 1499–1546) was a German-born painter in the Kingdom of Naples.

== Life ==
Calcar was born in the Duchy of Cleves sometime between 1499 and 1510. Vasari refers to him several times, mainly with respect to his having been a pupil of Titian. Calcar entered Titian's school in 1536 and was accepted to his faculty for his extraordinarily accurate copies of the works of that master. Calcar appears to have worked first at Dordrecht, but the greater part of his life was spent at Naples, and there, as Vasari tells us, "the fairest hopes had been conceived respecting his future progress".

== Works ==
Giorgio Vasari, Carel van Mander, and others credit Calcar with the eleven large woodcut illustrations of anatomical studies which accompanied Andreas Vesalius's work on anatomy. The most notable among these is the anatomical study of the human body entitled De humani corporis fabrica libri septem or On the Fabric of the Human Body in Seven Books (1543).

Calcar is also said to have drawn the portraits of the artists in the early edition of Vasari's Lives. By some writers he has been declared to have been a close imitator of Giorgione; all who write about him unite in stating that his imitations of the works of the great Venetian artists, and also of Raphael, were so extraordinary that they deceived many critics of the day. His pictures are to be seen in Berlin, Paris, Florence, Vienna, and Prague, and his original works are, as a rule, portraits, although at Prague there is a remarkable "Nativity" by him, which was once the property of Rubens.
