= Learned medicine =

Early modern European tradition

Learned medicine is the European medical tradition in the Early Modern period, when it experienced the tension between the texts derived from ancient Greek medicine, particularly by followers of the teachings attributed to Hippocrates and those of Galen vs. the newer theories of natural philosophy spurred on by Renaissance humanistic studies, the religious Reformation and the establishment of scientific societies. The Renaissance principle of "ad fontes" as applied to Galen sought to establish better texts of his writings, free from later accretions from Arabic-derived texts and texts of medieval Latin. This search for better texts was influential in the early 16th century. Historians use the term medical humanism to define this textual activity, pursued for its own sake.

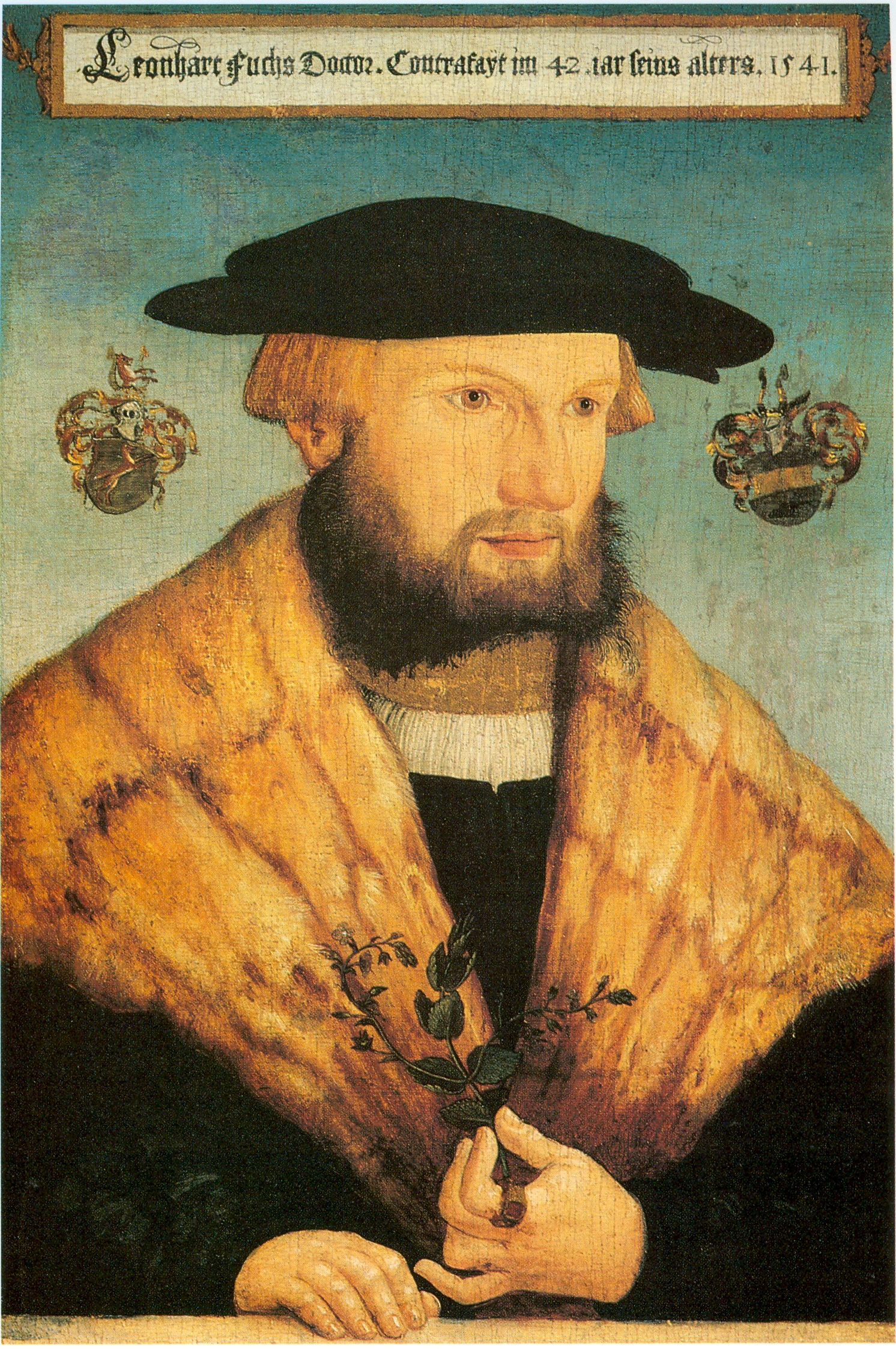
Portrait of a Renaissance physician Leonhart Fuchs

Learned medicine centred on the practica, a genre of Latin texts based on description of diseases and their treatment (nosology). Its interests were less in the abstract reasoning of medieval medicine and in the tradition of Avicenna, on which it was built, and instead it was based more on the diagnosis and treatment of particular diseases. Practica, covering diagnosis and therapies, was contrasted with theorica, which dealt with physiology and abstract thought on health and illness. The tradition from Galen valued practica less than theorica concepts, but from the 15th century the status of practica in learned medicine rose.

"Learned medicine" in this sense was also an academic discipline. It was taught in European universities, and its faculty had the same status as those of theology and law. Learned medicine is typically contrasted with the folk medicine of the period, but it has been argued that the distinction is not rigorous. Its Galenic teachings were challenged successively by Paracelsianism and Helmontianism.

== Learned medicine and syphilis ==
Around the year 1500 an issue for learned medicine was the nature of morbus gallicus, now identified as venereal syphilis. Alessandro Benedetti, in particular, advocated the line that it was a novel disease, not described in the traditional authorities. Niccolo Leoniceno conceded that in terms of symptoms it could not be identified as known to the ancients; but denied that novel diseases could exist.

== See also ==
- Medical Renaissance
- Quarrel of the Ancients and the Moderns
