= Stefano Sandrone =

Italian neuroscientist

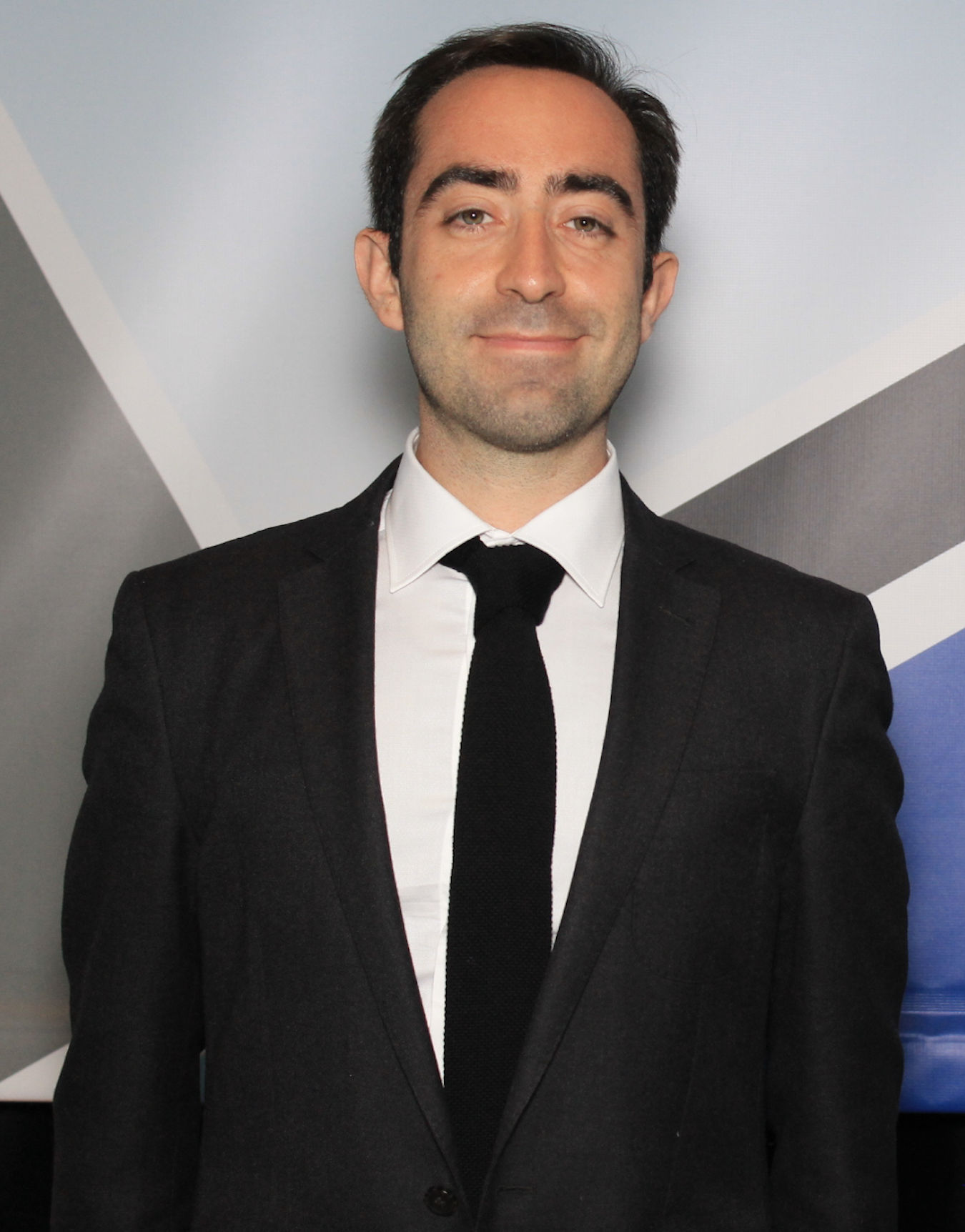
- Stefano Sandrone at the 2017 Annual Meeting of the American Academy of Neurology in Boston, Massachusetts
- Born: 1st of February 1988; Canelli, Italy
- Citizenship: Italy
- Education: Vita-Salute San Raffaele University; King's College London
- Awards: H. Richard Tyler Award; Biennial Award for Outstanding Book; Lawrence C. McHenry Award; Julia Higgins Award; SfN Science Educator Award; President's Award for Excellence in Education; A.B. Baker Teacher Recognition Award (twice); TASME Mentorship Prize; AMEE Miriam Friedman Ben-David Award; ANA Distinguished Neurology Teacher Award; National Teaching Fellowship
- Scientific career
- Fields: Neuroscience; Educational research History of neuroscience History of Neurology
- Workplaces: Imperial College London
- Website: www.stefanosandrone.com

Stefano Sandrone (born 1988) is an Italian neuroscientist, an educationalist and a principal teaching fellow at Imperial College London.

== Life and works ==
Stefano Sandrone was born in Canelli, Italy, on 1 February 1988, and obtained a Ph.D. in Neuroscience at King's College London, United Kingdom, where he started his career as a teaching fellow. In 2014 he was selected as a young scientist for the 64th Lindau Nobel Laureate Meeting in Physiology or Medicine, which was attended by 37 Nobel Laureates, and appeared in Wired magazine's list of the 'most promising Italians under 35’.

In 2015 he co-authored the book entitled Brain Renaissance, and, for this, he won the biennial Award for Outstanding Book in the History of the Neurosciences presented by the International Society for the History of the Neurosciences. He also appeared as a contributor to the 41st edition of the Gray's Anatomy.

In 2016 Sandrone was awarded the H. Richard Tyler Award presented by the American Academy of Neurology, which is the world's largest association of neurologists. In 2017 he was elected as Vice Chair of the History of Neurology Section within the same Academy, thus becoming the youngest Vice Chair at the American Academy of Neurology. In the same year he was also recognised as a Fellow of the Higher Education Academy.

In 2018 Sandrone was nominated as one of the eleven experts under 40 within the Health Research Section and the Section for the evaluation of health research projects presented by researchers under 40 at the Comitato Tecnico Sanitario, Italian Minister of Health.

In 2019 he was awarded the Lawrence C. McHenry Award from the American Academy of Neurology, thus winning his second Academy Award in three years. Moreover, in the same year he was elected as the youngest Chair within the American Academy of Neurology, and in July he was awarded the Julia Higgins Award from Imperial College London for 'his significant contribution to the support of academic women at the College'. Later in the year, he also won the Science Educator Award awarded from the Society for Neuroscience (SfN), which is 'the world's largest organization of scientists and physicians devoted to understanding the brain and the nervous system'.

In 2020 he won two additional educational awards, namely the President's Award for Excellence in Education awarded from Imperial College London and the A.B. Baker Teacher Recognition Award from the American Academy of Neurology, thus winning his third Academy Award in four years. In the same year, he was also recognised as a Senior Fellow of the Higher Education Academy.

In 2021 he published Nobel Life, a book edited by Lindau Nobel Laureate Meetings and published by Cambridge University Press, which has been selected by Forbes as an honourable mention in The Best Higher Education Books Of 2021.

In 2022 he authored The birth of modern neuroscience in Turin, favourably reviewed by Lancet Neurology, and won the Trainees in the Association for the Study of Medical Education (TASME) Mentorship Prize. In 2024, he has won the A.B. Baker Teacher Recognition Award from the American Academy of Neurology for the second time, his fourth Academy Award, and also the Miriam Friedman Ben-David Award from the Association for Medical Education in Europe (AMEE) and the Distinguished Neurology Teacher Award from the American Neurological Association, as the first European and youngest winner. In 2025 he was awarded the National Teaching Fellowship, the UK's most prestigious teaching excellence award, by Advance HE.

Sandrone's works also include the rediscovery of the manuscript of the first functional neuroimaging experiment, which has been featured in several magazines and newspapers, and the narration of the '(delayed) history of the brain lymphatic system' in Nature Medicine.

== Awards and honours ==
- 2014 Included in Wired magazine list of 'promising Italians under 35’
- 2016 H. Richard Tyler Award for the History of Neurology presented by the American Academy of Neurology
- 2016 Biennial Award for Outstanding Book in the History of the Neurosciences presented by the International Society for the History of the Neurosciences
- 2019 Lawrence C. McHenry Award presented by the American Academy of Neurology
- 2019 Julia Higgins Award awarded from Imperial College London
- 2019 Science Educator Award awarded from the Society for Neuroscience
- 2020 President's Award for Excellence in Education awarded from Imperial College London
- 2020 A.B. Baker Teacher Recognition Award from the American Academy of Neurology
- 2022 Trainees in the Association for the Study of Medical Education (TASME) Mentorship Prize
- 2023 High Commendation for Development of the Educational Portfolio at the Faculty of Medicine, Imperial College London for the Silver Jubilee
- 2024 A.B. Baker Teacher Recognition Award from the American Academy of Neurology
- 2024 Miriam Friedman Ben-David Award from the Association for Medical Education in Europe (AMEE)
- 2024 Distinguished Neurology Teacher Award from the American Neurological Association
- 2025 National Teaching Fellowship from Advance HE
