= De Humani Corporis Fabrica Libri Septem =

1543 anatomy books by Andreas Vesalius

De Humani Corporis Fabrica
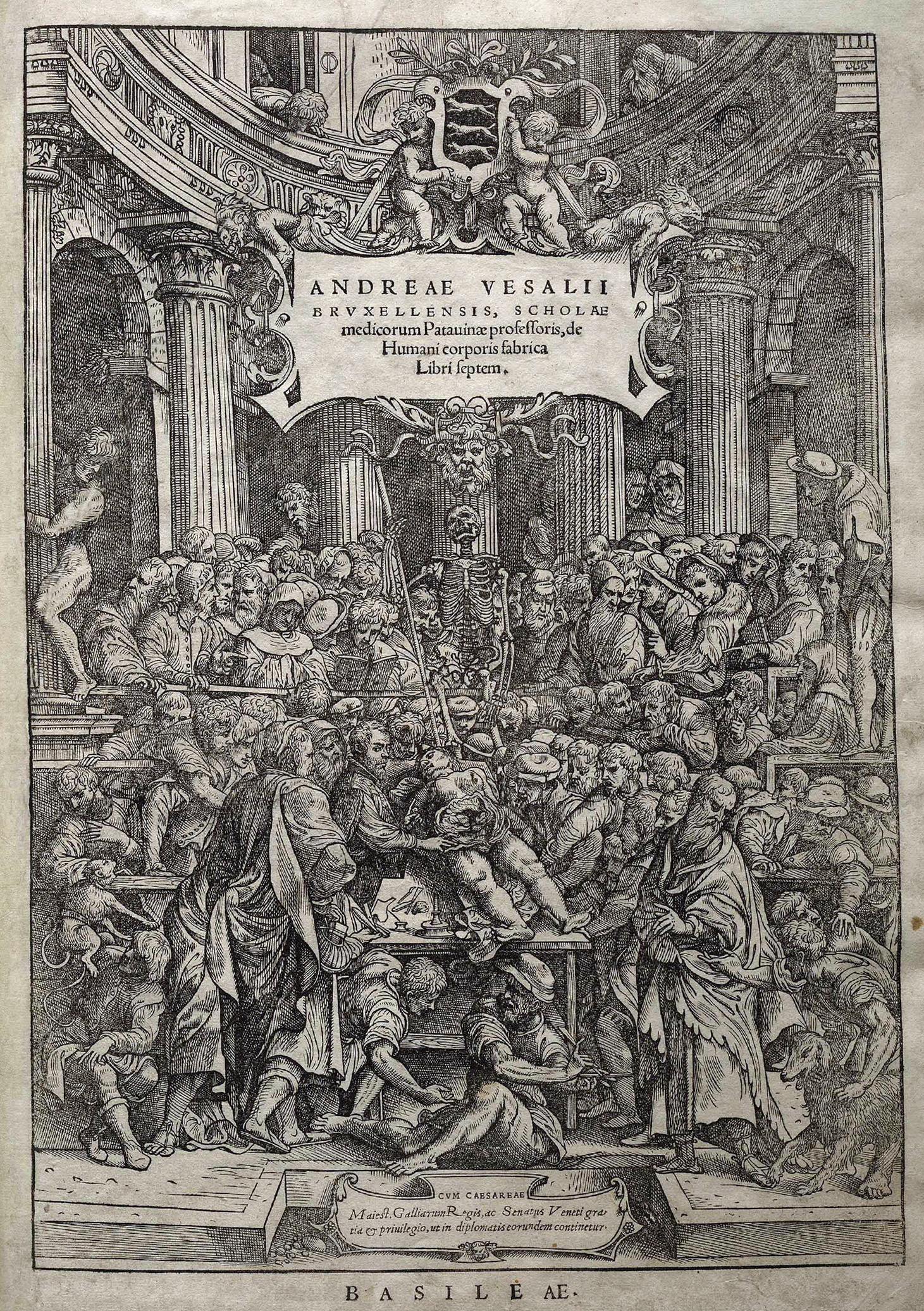
- Title page. Andreae Vesalii Bruxellensis, scholae medicorum Patauinae professoris, de Humani corporis fabrica Libri septem (Andreas Vesalius of Brussels, professor at the school of medicine at Padua, On the Fabric of the Human Body in Seven Books).
- Author: Andreas Vesalius
- Illustrator: Studio of Titian
- Subject: Anatomy
- Genre: Illustrated textbook
- Publisher: Joannes Oporinus
- Publication date: June 1543
- Publication place: Basel, Switzerland

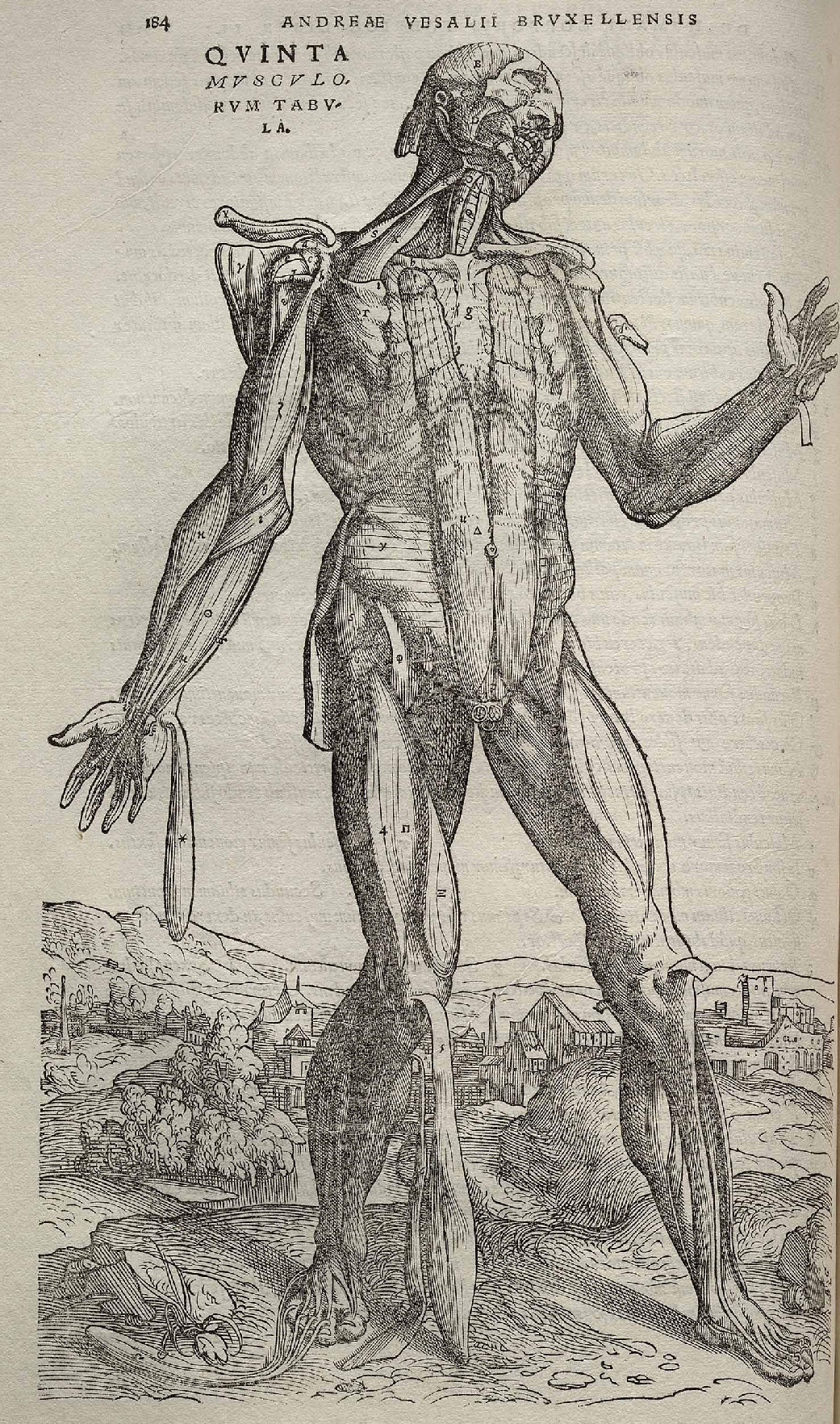
The Fabrica is known for its highly detailed illustrations of human dissections, often in allegorical poses.

De Humani Corporis Fabrica Libri Septem (Latin, "On the Fabric of the Human Body in Seven Books") is a set of books on human anatomy written by Andreas Vesalius. The collection of books is based on his Paduan lectures, during which he deviated from common practice by dissecting a corpse to illustrate what he was discussing. Dissections had previously been performed by a barber surgeon under the direction of a doctor of medicine, who was not expected to perform manual labour. Vesalius's and the complete structure of the human body. This would not have been possible without the many advances that had been made during the Renaissance, including artistic developments in literal visual representation and the technical development of printing with refined woodcuts. Because of these developments and his careful, immediate involvement, Vesalius was able to produce illustrations superior to any produced previously.

== Books of the collection ==
Vesalius arranged his work into seven books.

=== Book 1: The Bones and Cartilages ===
The first book constitutes about a quarter of the entire collection. It presents Vesalius' observations on human bones and cartilage, which he collected from cemeteries. It covers the physical appearance of human bones and the differentiation of human bones and cartilage by function. In each chapter Vesalius describes the bones in great detail, explaining their physical qualities in different ways. In the opening chapters, Vesalius "gives general aspects of bones and skeletal organisation, dealing with the differences in texture, strength, and resilience between bone and cartilage; explaining the complex differences between types of joints and reviewing some basic elements of descriptive techniques and terminology." A major theme of this book is whether Galen described the bones of the human skeleton accurately. When Vesalius lectured on the human skeleton, he also presented the bones of animals to give credibility to Galen's observations.

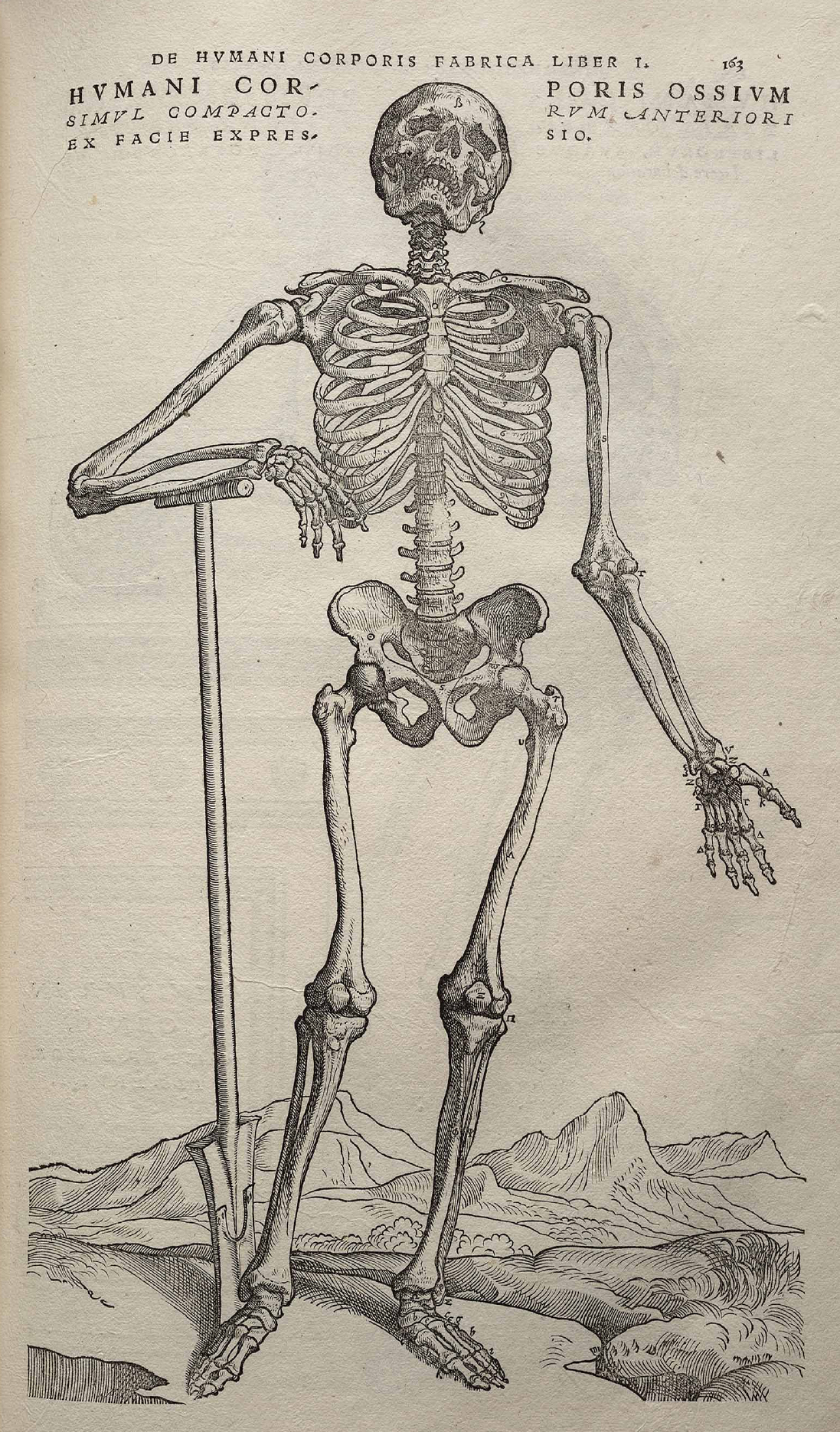
Image from Andreas Vesalius' De humani corporis fabrica (1543), page 163.

=== Book 2: The Ligaments and Muscles ===
Anatomical illustration from Vesalius's De humani corporis fabrica (1543)

Here Vesalius describes the structure of the muscles, the agents used in creating movement by the body, and the material used to hold the joints together. Through his observations of butchers cutting meat, he was able to incorporate the skills they used in the dissection of the human body. The order in which to dissect a human body to effectively observe each muscle in the body is laid out. Each illustration displays a deepening view of the human body which can be followed while dissecting a human body. Vesalius also mentions the instruments needed to perform a dissection. Here Vesalius begins to describe how Galen's anatomical descriptions do not match his own observations. In order to show respect to Galen, he suggests Galen's use of anatomical structure is in fact correct, but not for humans. He even continues to describe some of the structures in the way Galen would.

=== Books 3 and 4: The Veins and Arteries; The Nerves ===
In Books 3 and 4, Vesalius describes the veins, arteries, and nerves as vessels, but notes their differing physical structure: veins and arteries contains a hollow channel, but nerves do not. Vesalius describes the route by which air travels through the lungs and the heart. He describes this process as "a tree whose trunks divide into branches and twigs". He also describes how the body contains four veins (the portal vein, the venae cavae, the artery-like vein [now understood as the Pulmonary Vein], and the umbilical vein) and two arteries (the aorta, and the vein-like artery [now understood as the Pulmonary Artery]) as being the main vessels which branch out into smaller veins and arteries. Vesalius lists some six hundred vessels in his tabulation of arteries, veins and nerves, but fails to mention the smaller vessels located in the hands and feet, the terminal vessels of the cutaneous nerves, or the vessels in the lungs and liver.

=== Book 5: The Organs of Nutrition and Generation ===
Vesalius gives detailed descriptions of the organs of nutrition, the urinary system, and the male and female reproductive systems. The alimentary and reproductive systems each make up about forty percent of this book, and the description of the renal system and the correct technique for dissecting it makes up the remainder. In the final chapter, the longest chapter of the entire collection, Vesalius gives detailed step-by-step instructions on how to dissect the abdominopelvic organs. In the first half of the book, Vesalius describes the peritoneum, the esophagus, the stomach, the omentum, the intestines and the mesentery. He then goes on to describe the liver, gallbladder, and the spleen. Finally, he describes the kidneys, the bladder, and the ureters. Vesalius was unfamiliar with the anatomy of pregnancy, which lead him to erroneously provide illustrations of a zonary (band-shaped) placenta and fetal membrane in the 1543 edition of De Fabrica; Vesalius does so relying on Galenic medicine which used canine reproductive organs rather than human female reproductive organs. The illustrations are corrected in the 1555 edition. The new images depict a discoid placenta and fetal membrane.

=== Book 6: The Heart and Associated Organs, Book 7: The Brain ===
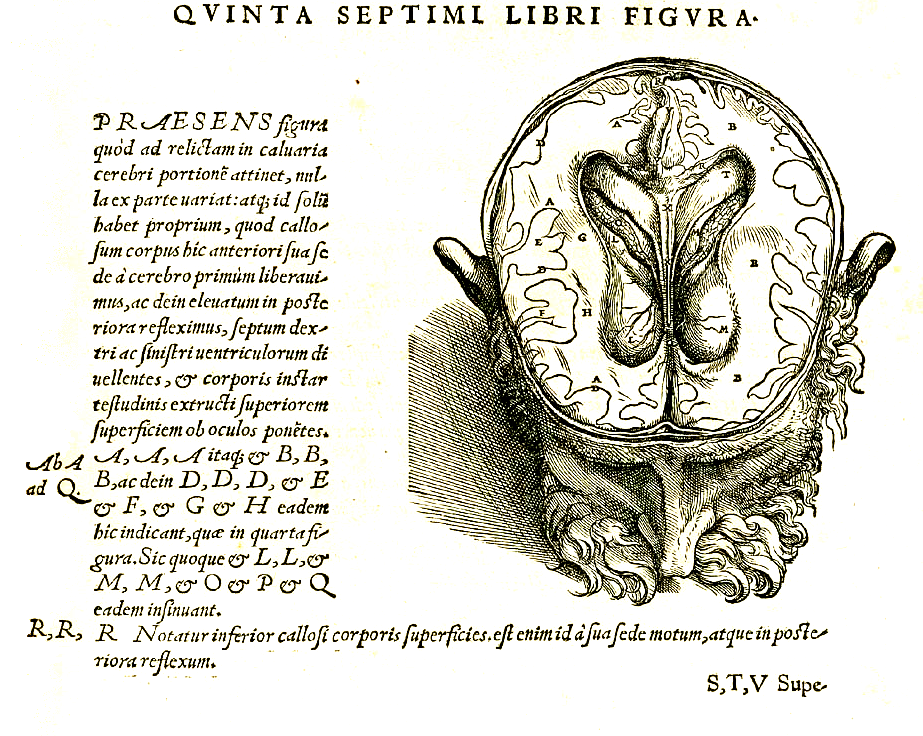
Vesalius' De humani corporis fabrica, figure on plate 609, contrasted.

These books describe the structure and functions of the heart and the organs of respiration, the brain and its coverings, the eye, the organs of sensation, and the nerves of the limbs. A chapter is also devoted to the dissection of the eye. Vesalius describes the organs of the body in great detail by commenting "on the variable strength of the attachment of the pleura to the thoracic walls, the strong attachment of the pericardium to the diaphragm, the shape and orientation of the ventricles of the heart, and the description of the semilunar valves." He closes each book with a chapter on the correct way to dissect the heart and the brain respectively.

== Galen's errors ==
Galen, the prominent Greek physician, surgeon and philosopher in the Roman Empire, had written on anatomy among other topics, but his work remained largely unchecked until the time of Vesalius. The Fabrica rectified some of Galen's worst errors, including the notion that the great blood vessels originated from the liver. Other errors rectified included the idea that the human mandible was in two parts (it is, in fact, in one part) and that men had fewer ribs than women. Some older historical accounts claimed that Vesalius' findings led to a decline in his favor with the Church because they allegedly contradicted a biblical interpretation of human anatomy, particularly regarding the "rib of Adam" (the belief that men had one fewer rib than women, based on Genesis 2:21–22). However, modern scholarship recognizes this narrative as a product of anti-clerical bias rather than historical reality. While examining a human corpse, Vesalius discovered that Galen's observations were inconsistent with his, due to Galen's use of animal (dog and monkey) cadavers. Overall, Vesalius's use of human corpses allowed him to rectify approximately 300 of Galen's errors. Even with his improvements, however, Vesalius clung to some of Galen's errors, such as the idea that veins and arteries carried different respective types of blood. It was not until William Harvey's work on the circulation of the blood (De Motu Cordis, 1628) that this misconception of Galen's would be rectified in Europe.

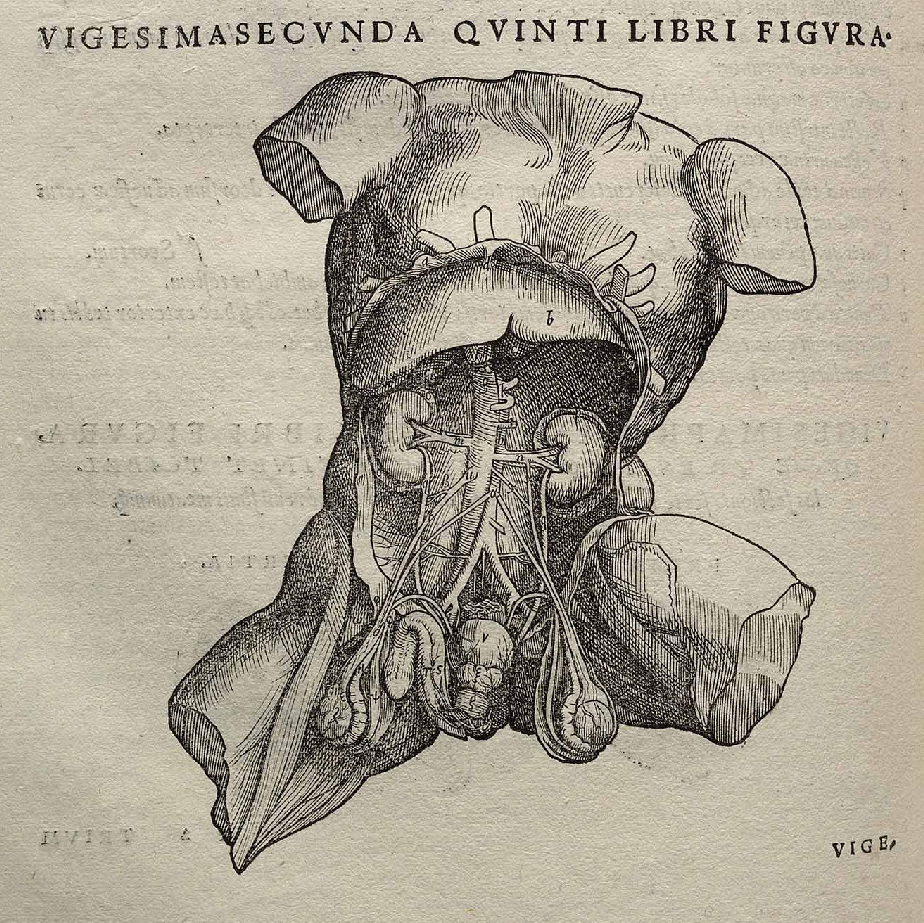
Image from De humani corporis fabrica (1543), page 372.

== Publication ==
=== 1543 edition ===
Vesalius had the work published at the age of 28, taking great pains to ensure its quality, and dedicated it to Charles V, Holy Roman Emperor. The more than 250 illustrations are of great artistic merit and are generally attributed by modern scholars to the "studio of Titian" rather than Johannes Stephanus of Calcar, who provided drawings for Vesalius' earlier tracts. The woodcuts were greatly superior to the illustrations in anatomical atlases of the day, which were never made by anatomy professors themselves. The woodcut blocks were transported to Basel, Switzerland, as Vesalius wished that the work be published by one of the foremost printers of the time, Johannes Oporinus. Vesalius' written directions to Oporinus (the iter) were so valuable the printer decided to include them. The illustrations were engraved on wooden blocks, which allowed for very fine detail.

=== 1555 edition ===
A second edition was published in 1555. Annotations in a copy of that edition preserved in KU Leuven Libraries have been identified as Vesalius's own, showing that he was contemplating a third edition, never achieved.

== Reception ==
The success of Fabrica recouped the work's considerable expense, and brought Vesalius European fame, partly through cheap unauthorized copies. He was appointed physician to the Holy Roman Emperor Charles V; Vesalius presented him with the first published copy (bound in silk of imperial purple, with specially hand-painted illustrations not found in any other copy). To accompany the Fabrica, Vesalius published a condensed and less expensive Epitome: at the time of publication in 1543, it cost 10 batzen. As a result, the Epitome became more widely seen than the Fabrica; it contained eight anatomical engravings that condensed visual material from the Fabrica, one illustration of the human skeleton taken directly from the Fabrica, and two new woodcut plates.

== Human remains ==
During the 16th century, the dissection of human bodies was strictly prohibited by the Church. Therefore, in order to combat this opposition, Vesalius had to secretly take the bodies of executed criminals, a process which he explains in De Humani Corporis Fabrica. This process of stealing the dead bodies of criminals was a key way for anatomists and artists to study the human body. For example in 1828 the case of Burke and Hare, whereby the bodies were delivered to anatomists for dissection, were murdered specifically for financial gain.

== Surviving copies ==
More than 700 copies survive from the 1543 and 1555 editions. Of those, by 2018 some 29 copies were in London, 20 in Paris, 14 in Boston, 13 in New York, 12 in Cambridge (England), one in Puebla's Biblioteca Palafoxiana (Mexico), and 11 each in Oxford and Rome. John Hay Library at Brown University owns a copy bound in tanned human skin.

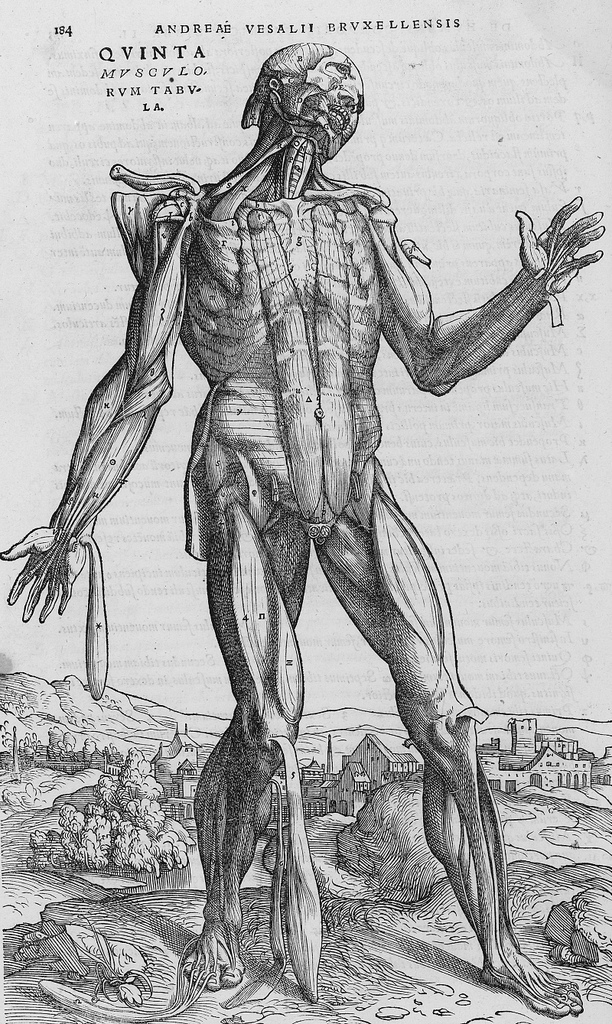

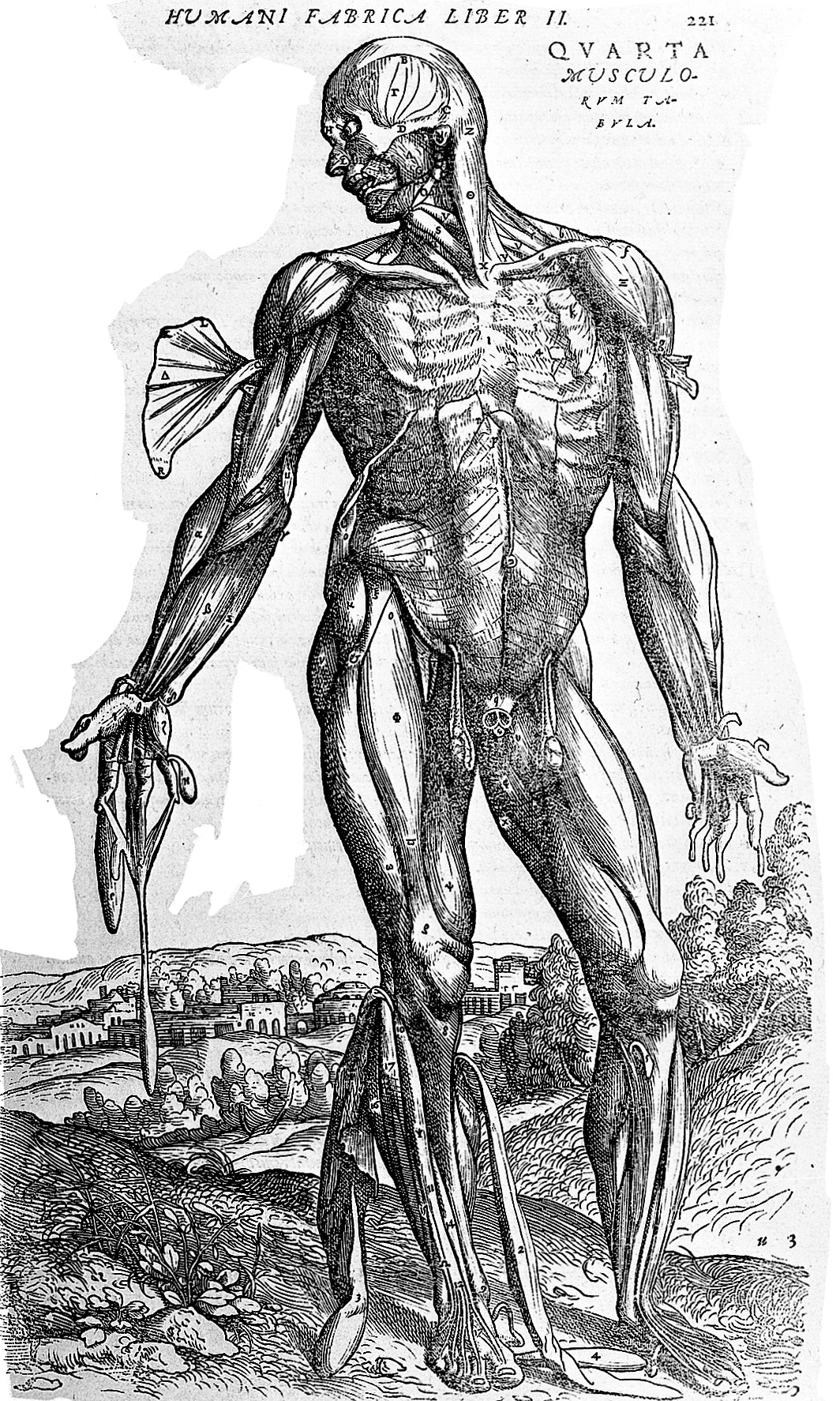

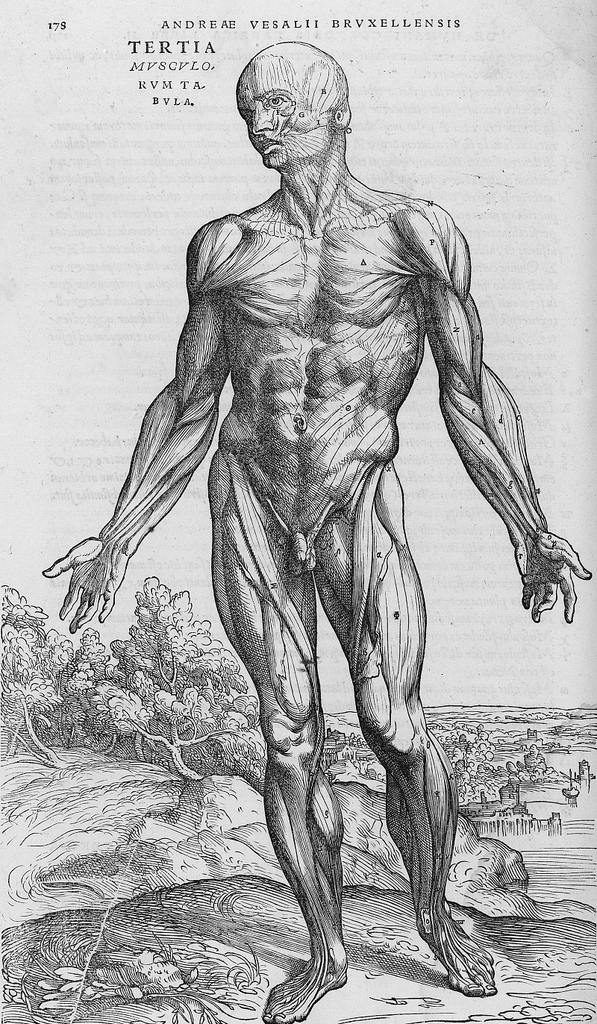

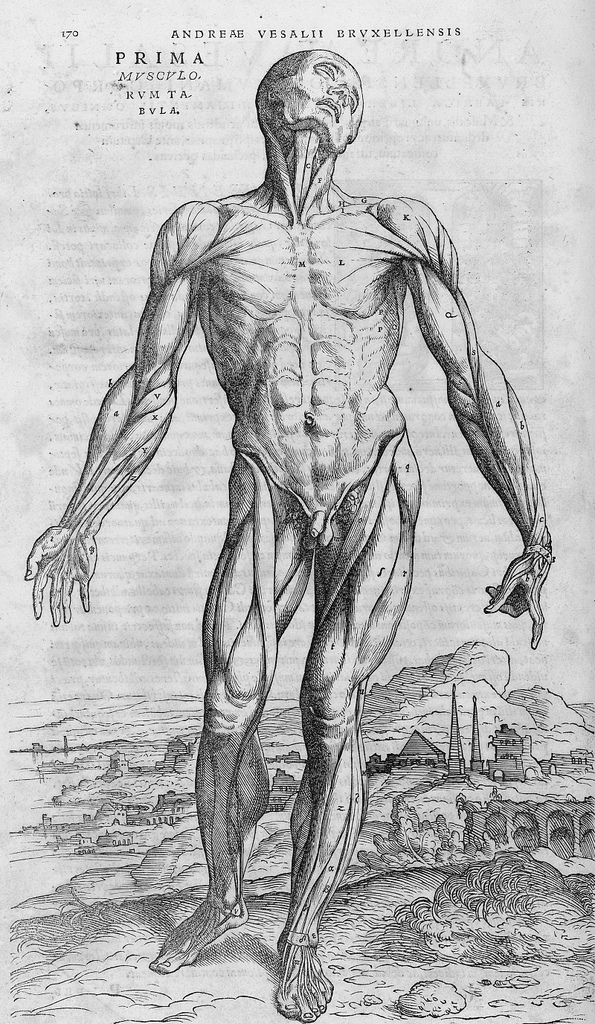

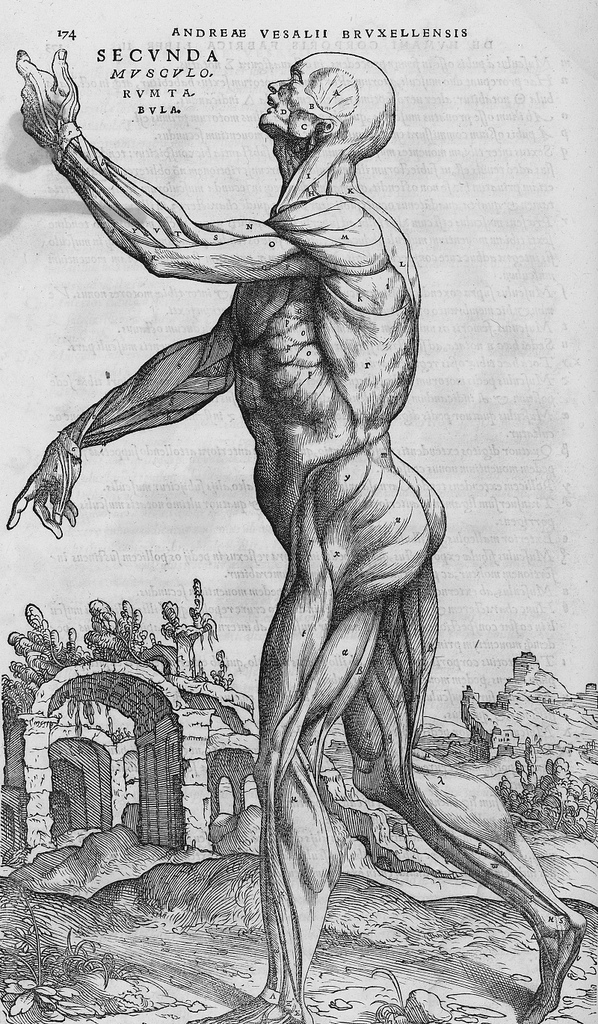

Some of the images, even though separated by several pages in the text, make a continuous landscape panorama in the background when placed side-by-side.

De humani corporis fabrica 1543 at the State Library of New South Wales

A copy was purchased by the State Library of New South Wales in Australia in 2022 where it has been on public display for a variety of exhibitions.

In February 2024, a second-edition copy was sold at a Christie's online auction for $2,228,000, making it one of the most expensive scientific documents ever to be sold at auction. The copy, which had last been sold in 2007 for €13,200, was found to have been Vesalius' personal copy. Extensive handwritten annotations in the margins were determined to have been written by Vesalius himself.

== Legacy ==
De Humani Corporis Fabrica, a 2022 documentary film about the human body by Lucien Castaing-Taylor and Véréna Paravel, was named after the book series.

== See also ==
- List of most expensive books and manuscripts

== Bibliography ==
- O'Malley, C.D. Andreas Vesalius of Brussels, 1514-1564. Berkeley: University of California Press, 1964.
- Vesalius, Andreas. De humani corporis fabrica libri septem [Title page: Andreae Vesalii Bruxellensis, scholae medicorum Patauinae professoris De humani corporis fabrica libri septem]. Basileae [Basel]: Ex officina Joannis Oporini, 1543.

=== Translations ===
- Vesalius, Andreas. On the Fabric of the Human Body: Volume I: Book I: The Bones and Cartilages, translated by W. F. Richardson and J. B. Carman. San Francisco and Novato: Norman Publishing, 1998. ISBN 0-930405-73-0.
- Vesalius, Andreas. On the Fabric of the Human Body: Volume II: Book II: The Ligaments and Muscles, translated by W. F. Richardson and J. B. Carman. San Francisco and Novato: Norman Publishing, 1999. ISBN 0-930405-75-7
- Vesalius, Andreas. On the Fabric of the Human Body: Volume III: Book III: The Veins and Arteries; Book IV: The Nerves, translated by W. F. Richardson and J. B. Carman. San Francisco and Novato: Norman Publishing, 2003. ISBN 0-930405-83-8.
- Vesalius, Andreas. On the Fabric of the Human Body: Volume IV: Book V: The Organs of Nutrition and Generation, translated by W. F. Richardson and J. B. Carman. San Francisco and Novato: Norman Publishing, 2008. ISBN 978-0-930405-88-5
- Vesalius, Andreas. On the Fabric of the Human Body: Volume V: Book VI: The Heart and Associated Organs; Book VII: The Brain, translated by W. F. Richardson and J. B. Carman. San Francisco and Novato: Norman Publishing, 2009. ISBN 978-0-930405-90-8
- Vesalius, Andreas. The Fabric of the Human Body. An Annotated Translation of the 1543 and 1555 Editions, edited by D.H. Garrison and M.H. Hast, Northwestern University, 2003.
- Vesalius, Andreas. La Fabrique du corps humain (1543), livre I dans La fabrique de Vésale et autres textes. First translation in French by J. Vons et S. Velut, Paris, BIU Santé, 2014.
