= Tom King (highwayman) =

English highwayman (c. 1712–1737)

- Born: Matthew King c. 1712
- Died: 19 May 1737 (aged 24–25); New Prison, Clerkenwell, Middlesex
- Occupation: Highwayman
- Spouse: Elizabeth

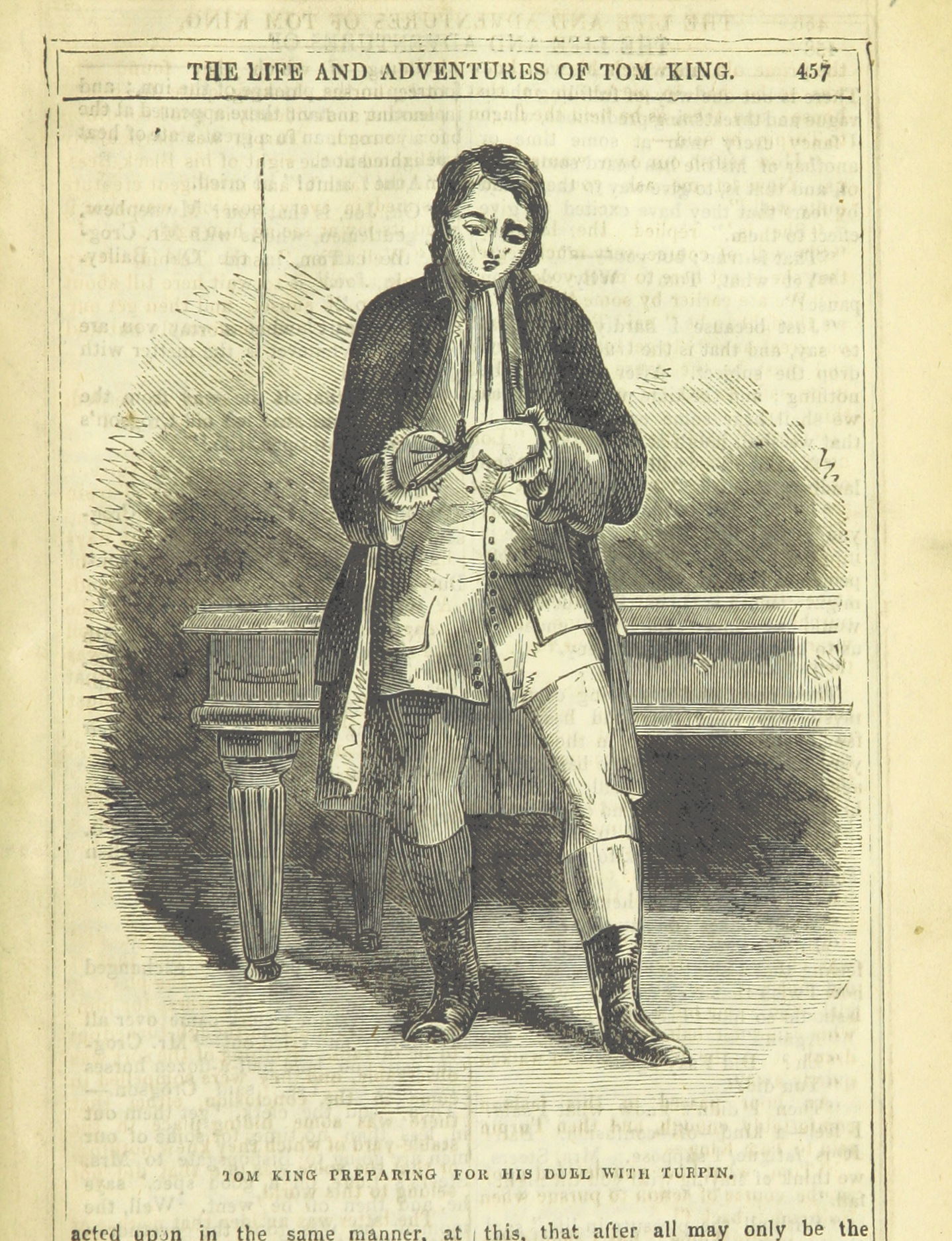
Print from 'The life and adventures of T.K'

Tom King (c. 1712 – 19 May 1737) was an English highwayman who operated in the Essex and London areas. His real name is thought to have been Matthew King; whether "Tom" was a nickname or an error in reporting his crimes is uncertain, but it is the name by which he has become popularly known. Some sources claim that he was nicknamed "The Gentleman Highwayman" and he was also known as “Captain Tom King”. A contemporary account of his last robbery also mentions a brother, either John or Robert King, who was captured by the authorities on that occasion. Other reports also mention an “Elizabeth King”, possibly his wife who is mentioned in King's will.

King's fame rests mainly on his association with highwayman Dick Turpin. According to The Newgate Calendar (published nearly forty years after the deaths of Turpin and King), their first encounter occurred when "Turpin, seeing him well mounted and appearing like a gentleman, thought that was the time to recruit his pockets", and tried to rob him.

The Newgate Calendar goes on to say that King was "very well known about the country". According to legend, the two joined forces and hid out in a cave in Epping Forest and pursued a successful partnership. Their first crime together was to steal a race horse called White Stockings or Whitestocking, but it was under King's influence that Turpin turned from his life of petty crime to a career as a highwayman. On 2 May 1737, during a robbery that went wrong, King was shot, possibly by Turpin himself. The Stamford Mercury reported on 12 May 1737 that King had been 'shot through the shoulder' and, on the same day, the Derby Mercury reported that King was 'attended by two surgeons' at New Prison in Clerkenwell. King later died of his wounds on 19 May 1737, aged about 25. He was buried at St James’ churchyard in Clerkenwell on 21 May 1737. In his will, King bequeathed the entirety of his effects to his “loving wife Elizabeth King.”

== In popular culture ==
- King appears in Harrison Ainsworth's romantic novel Rookwood, published in 1834. This has been the source of much pseudo-historical information about both King and Turpin.
- A play entitled Dick Turpin & Tom King was written by Victorian playwright W. E. Suter in 1861.
