= John Nevison =

English highwayman (1639–1684)

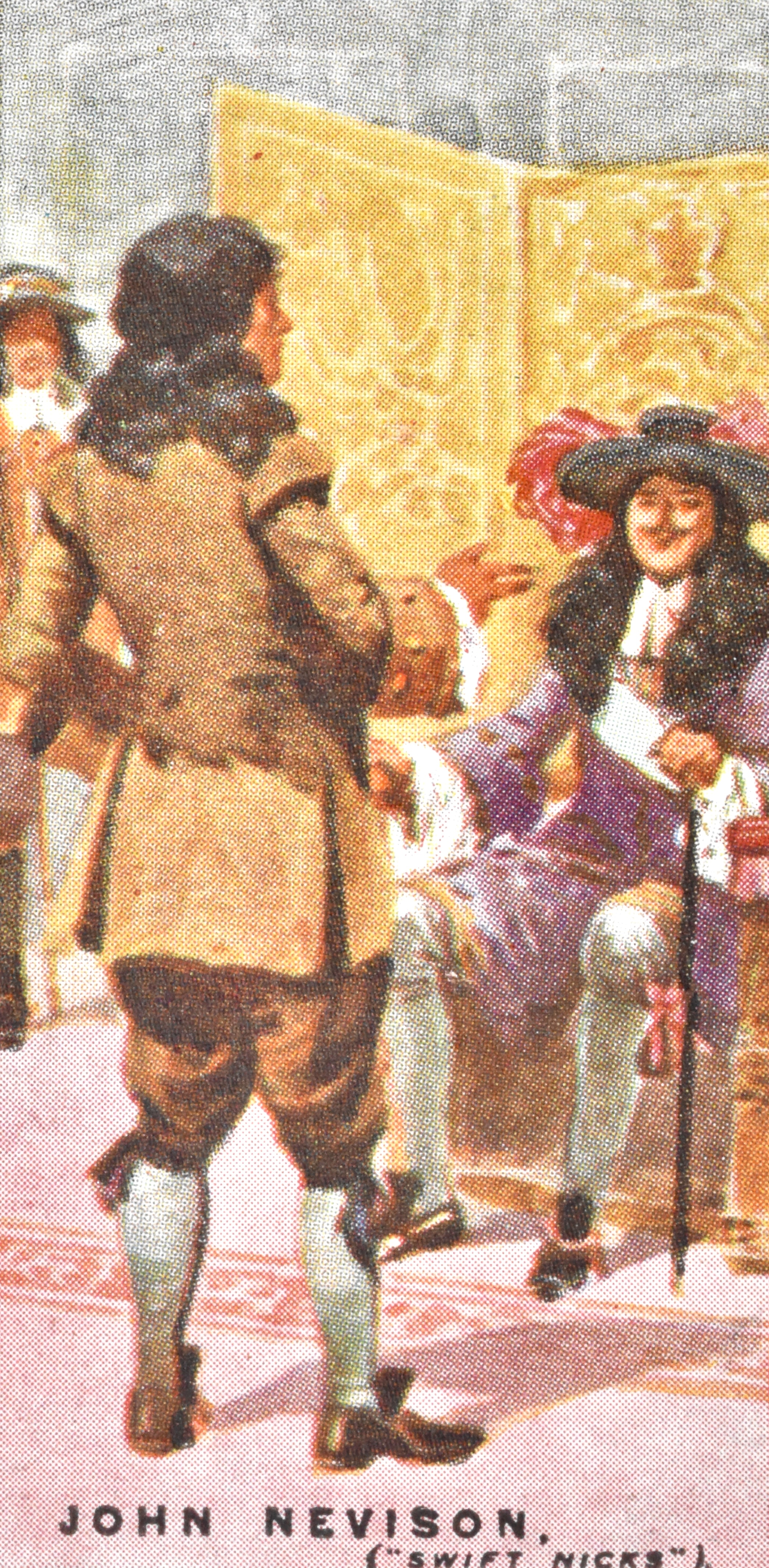
A cigarette card by W.D. & H.O. Wills depicting John "Swift Nicks" Nevison before Charles II.

John Nevison (1639 – 4 May 1684), also known as William Nevison or Nevinson, was one of England's most notorious highwaymen, a gentleman rogue supposedly nicknamed Swift Nick by King Charles II after a renowned 200-mile (320 km) dash from Kent to York to establish an alibi for a robbery he had committed earlier that day. The story inspired William Harrison Ainsworth to include a modified version in his novel Rookwood, in which he attributed the feat to Dick Turpin. There are suggestions that the feat was actually undertaken by Samuel Nicks. The TV series Dick Turpin had an accomplice of the highwayman, Nick, who earned the nickname "Swiftnick".

== History ==
Nevison was born in 1639, probably in Wortley, West Riding of Yorkshire (present-day South Yorkshire). He ran away from home at the age of 13 or 14 and may have ended up in London. Forced to flee to Holland to evade the authorities he enrolled in the Duke of York's army and took part in the 1658 Battle of Dunkirk. After his discharge he returned to England and took care of his father for several years before adopting the same profession as many of his contemporary ex-soldiers, that of a highwayman. Basing himself around Newark-on-Trent, he targeted those travelling along the Great North Road between Huntingdon in the south and York to the north.

In the mid-1670s his activities were under investigation and he was associated with men named Edmund Bracy, Thomas Wilbore, Thomas Tankerd, John Bromett, and William (or Robert) Everson and John Brace or Bracy, which may have been his alias. The robbers used safe houses at Tuxford and Wentbridge and divided their spoils at the Talbot Inn at Newark. Nevison developed a reputation as a gentleman highwayman, never using violence against his victims, always polite, and robbing only the rich.

The famous ride from Kent to York took place in 1676, after Nevison had robbed a traveller at Gad's Hill, near Rochester, Kent. Nevison escaped, using a ferry to cross the Thames and galloped via Chelmsford, Cambridge and Huntingdon to York some 200 miles (320 km) from the scene of the crime. He arrived at sunset and ensured he met the city's Lord Mayor, entering into a wager on a bowls match. When he was arrested and tried for the Gad's Hill robbery, he produced the Lord Mayor to support his alibi and was found not guilty.

Nevison was tried and convicted for the theft of a horse and highway robbery at York assizes in 1677. He was imprisoned in York Castle but, on offering to inform against his accomplices was pardoned and was to be transported. In 1681 he was taken from gaol to be enlisted in a company of soldiers bound for Tangier but escaped. A reward of £20 was offered for his recapture. He was arrested on 6 March 1684 at the Three Houses Inn in Sandal Magna near Wakefield and tried for the murder of Darcy Fletcher, a constable who had tried to arrest him near Howley Hall at Soothill in Batley. He was taken to York where, because he had breached his pardon, the judge "told him he must dye, for he was a terrour to the country". Nevison was hanged at the Knavesmire on 4 May 1684 and buried in an unmarked grave in St Mary's Church, Castlegate.

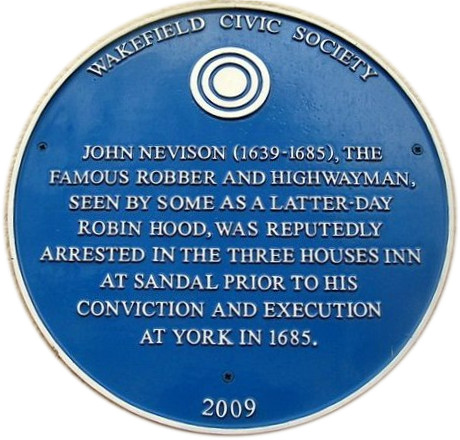
Blue plaque erected in 2009 at the Three Houses Inn, Sandal Magna, Wakefield

== Legacy ==
Nevison was idolised by the public, and ballads about his deeds were popular centuries after in the form of a folk song "Bold Nevison the Highwayman" (Roud 1082). The Lincolnshire folk singer Joseph Taylor knew three verses of a song about Nevison. Percy Grainger recorded Taylor singing the song on a phonograph in 1908; the original recording is available on the British Library Sound Archive website.

I've now robb'd a gentleman of two-pence,
I've neither done murder, nor killed,
But guilty I've been all my life time,
So gentlemen do as you will

I's when that I rode on the highway,
I've always had money in great store;
And whatever I look from the rich
I freely gave it to the poor.

(Lyrics taken from 1850s broadside printed in Manchester.)

In the 1913 novel Swift Nick of the York Road by George Edgar, Nevison is a gentleman who is cheated out of his fortune when gambling, wins several duels and finally profits from King Charles's clemency.

Hubert Clifford's 1935 Kentish Suite for orchestra has as its fourth movement "Swift Nicks of Gad's Hill", with the comment that "Nicholas Nevinson was a highwayman of the period who plied his business at Gad’s Hill near Gravesend. His famous ride to York, usually associated with the name of Dick Turpin, earned his title to fame, and King Charles, on hearing of his exploits, granted him a free pardon and dubbed him 'Swift Nicks'". The Gad's Hill reference and the pardon both appear in Defoe's account.
