= George Edgar =

George Edgar may refer to:

- George Edgar (academic) (1837–1913), president of Florida State University
- George Edgar (writer) (1877–1918), English writer and journalist
