= Francisco de la Reyna =

Francisco de la Reyna (fl. 1520) was a Spanish farrier and veterinarian who worked for the nobility and is known from a single book that he wrote in 1546, Libro de Albeyteria. Significant was his examination and findings of horse anatomy, particularly his emphatic note on the circulation of blood, written 80 years ahead of William Harvey.

Nothing much is known of Reyna except that he lived in Zamora where he served the Spanish nobility, caring for their horses. His manual Libro de Albeyteria was first published in 1546 at Madrid and various editions and extracts were published in later years. He noted in the book that when a horse is bled (blood-letting was a common therapy for both humans and animals in that period) from the legs, the blood flows from the lower part of the cut vessel and not the upper part, explaining that this was because the veins came from the liver, while the arteries were supplied with blood that came from the heart. He also noted that the blood carried nourishment. He also used the metaphor of a wheel for describing the flow of blood. He was otherwise following ideas from Galen. The discovery of Reyna's writings on blood flow were first made by Friar Benito Jerónimo Feijóo y Montenegro whose works were largely dismissed due to his continually changing positions and Spanish nationalist tendencies.
