= Crichton (novel) =

1837 novel

- Author: William Harrison Ainsworth
- Language: English
- Genre: Historical
- Publisher: Richard Bentley
- Publication date: 1837
- Publication place: United Kingdom
- Media type: Print

Crichton is an 1837 historical novel by the British writer William Harrison Ainsworth. It was published in three volumes by Richard Bentley. It is inspired by the life of the sixteenth century Scottish polymath James Crichton, known as the "Admirable Crichton". It was Ainsworth's follow-up to the 1834 bestselling novel Rookwood.

== Bibliography ==
- Carver, Stephen James. The Life and Works of the Lancashire Novelist William Harrison Ainsworth, 1850-1882. Edwin Mellen Press, 2003.
- Crofton, Ian. A Dictionary of Scottish Phrase and Fable. Birlinn, 2012.
- Schlicke, Paul. The Oxford Companion to Charles Dickens: Anniversary Edition. OUP Oxford, 2011.
- Sutherland, John. The Longman Companion to Victorian Fiction. Routledge, 2014.
