= William Harvey =

English physician (1578–1657)

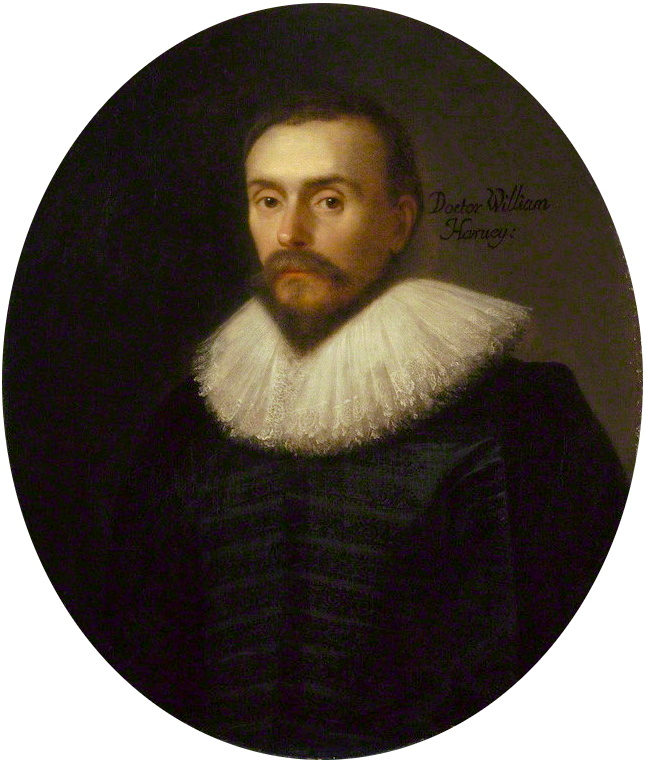
- Portrait attributed to Daniël Mijtens, c. 1627
- Born: 1 April 1578; Folkestone, Kent, England
- Died: 3 June 1657 (aged 79); Roehampton, London, England
- Education: Gonville and Caius College, Cambridge (B.A., 1597); University of Padua (M.D., 1602)
- Known for: De Motu Cordis, 1628 (translated as Anatomical Account of the Circulation of the Heart and Blood in 1928) on systemic circulation
- Spouse: Elizabeth Browne
- Scientific career
- Fields: Medicine; Anatomy
- Doctoral advisor: Hieronymus Fabricius

William Harvey (1 April 1578 – 3 June 1657) was an English physician who made influential contributions to anatomy and physiology. He was the first known physician to describe completely, and in detail, pulmonary and systemic circulation as well as the specific process of blood being pumped to the brain and the rest of the body by the heart (though earlier writers, such as Realdo Colombo, Michael Servetus, and Jacques Dubois, had provided precursors to some of his theories).

== Family ==
William's father, Thomas Harvey, was a jurat of Folkestone where he served as mayor in 1600. Records and personal descriptions delineate him as an overall calm, diligent, and intelligent man whose sons “... revered, consulted and implicitly trusted in him...” (they) made their father the treasurer of their wealth when they acquired great estates...(He) kept, employed, and improved their gainings to their great advantage." Thomas Harvey's portrait can still be seen in the central panel of a wall of the dining room at Rolls Park, Chigwell, in Essex. William was the eldest of nine children, seven sons and two daughters, of Thomas and his wife Joan Halke.

Notable family connections include Heneage Finch, 1st Earl of Nottingham, who married William's niece Elizabeth Harvey, and the diplomat Sir Daniel Harvey. His great nephew was the naval hero Eliab Harvey, captain of HMS Temeraire.

== Biography ==
=== Early life and the University of Padua ===
Harvey's initial education was carried out in Folkestone, where he learned Latin. He then entered the King's School in Canterbury. Harvey stayed at the King's School for five years, after which he matriculated at Gonville and Caius College, Cambridge in 1593.

Harvey graduated as a Bachelor of Arts from Caius in 1597. He then travelled through France and Germany to Italy, where he entered the University of Padua, in 1599.

During Harvey's years of study there, he developed a relationship with Fabricius and read Fabricius's De Venarum Ostiolis.

Harvey graduated as a Doctor of Medicine at the age of 24 from the University of Padua on 25 April 1602. Harvey had

conducted himself so wonderfully well in the examination and had shown such skill, memory and learning that he had far surpassed even the great hopes which his examiners had formed of him.

=== The College of Physicians, marriage and Saint Bartholomew's Hospital ===
After graduating from Padua, Harvey immediately returned to England, where he obtained the degree of Doctor of Medicine from the University of Cambridge that same year, and became a fellow of Gonville and Caius College, Cambridge. Following this, Harvey established himself in London, joining the Royal College of Physicians on 5 October 1604.

A few weeks after his admission, Harvey married Elizabeth Browne, "daughter of Lancelot Browne Dr. Physic" (a medical doctor). They had no children.

Harvey was elected a Fellow of the Royal College of Physicians on 5 June 1607, which earned him the Post-nominal letters FRCP. He then accepted a position at St Bartholomew's Hospital that he was to occupy for almost all the rest of his life. Succeeding Dr Wilkinson on 14 October 1609, he became the Physician in charge at St Bartholomew's Hospital, which enjoined him, "in God's most holy name" to "endeavor yourself to do the best of your knowledge in the profession of physic to the poor then present, or any other of the poor at any time of the week which shall be sent home unto you by the Hospitaller... You shall not, for favor, lucre or gain, appoint or write anything for the poor but such good and wholesome things as you shall think with your best advice will do the poor good, without any affection or respect to be had to the apothecary. And you shall take no gift or reward... for your counsel... This you will promise to do as you shall answer before God... "

Harvey earned around thirty-three pounds a year and lived in a small house in Ludgate, although two houses in West Smithfield were attached as fringe benefits to the post of Physician. At this point, the physician's function consisted of a simple but thorough analysis of patients who were brought to the hospital once a week and the subsequent writing of prescriptions.

=== Lumleian lecturer ===
The next important phase of Harvey's life began with his appointment to the office of Lumleian lecturer on 4 August 1615. The Lumleian lectureship, founded by Lord Lumley and Dr. Richard Caldwell in 1582, consisted in giving lectures for a period of seven years, with the purpose of "spreading light" and increasing the general knowledge of anatomy throughout England.

Harvey began his lectures in April 1616, and also compiled his lecture notes in a notebook. At this time, at the age of thirty-seven, he was described as "a man of lowest stature, round faced; his eyes small, round, very black and full of spirit; his hair as black as a raven and curling". The notes which he used at the time are preserved in the British Museum.

At the beginning of his lectures, Harvey laid down the canons for his guidance:

1. "To show as much as may be at a glance, the whole belly for instance, and afterwards to subdivide the parts according to their positions and relations.
2. To point out what is peculiar to the actual body which is being dissected.
3. To supply only by speech what cannot be shown on your own credit and by authority.
4. To cut up as much as may be in the sight of the audience.
5. To enforce the right opinion by remarks drawn far and near, and to illustrate man by the structure of animals.
6. Not to praise or dispraise other anatomists, for all did well, and there was some excuse even for those who are in error.
7. Not to dispute with others, or attempt to confute them, except by the most obvious retort.
8. To state things briefly and plainly, yet not letting anything pass unmentioned which can be seen.
9. Not to speak of anything which can be as well explained without the body or can be read at home.
10. Not to enter into too much detail, or in too minute dissection, for the time does not permit.
11. To serve three courses according to the glass [i.e. allot a definite time to each part of the body]. In the first day's lectures the abdomen, nasty yet recompensed by its infinite variety. In the second the parlour, [i.e. the thorax]. In the third day's lecture the divine banquet of the brain."

=== Physician to James I ===
Harvey continued to participate in the Lumleian lectures while also taking care of his patients at St Bartholomew's Hospital; he thus soon attained an important and fairly lucrative practice, which climaxed with his appointment as 'Physician Extraordinary' to King James I on 3 February 1618. He seems to have similarly served various aristocrats, including Lord Chancellor Bacon. Bacon entirely failed to impress the more practical-minded Harvey, who refused to regard him as a great philosopher. He said of him "He writes philosophy like a Lord Chancellor."

In 1628 he published in Frankfurt his completed treatise on the circulation of the blood, the De Motu Cordis. As a result of negative comments by other physicians Harvey "fell mightily in his practice", but continued advancing his career. He was re-elected 'Censor' of the College of Physicians in 1629, having been elected for the first time in 1613 and the second time in 1625. Eventually, Harvey was also elected treasurer of the college.

=== Witchcraft trials ===
Harvey was a prominent sceptic regarding allegations of witchcraft. He was one of the examiners of four women from Lancashire accused of witchcraft in 1634, and as a consequence of his report, all of them were acquitted. Earlier, in 1632, while travelling with the King to Newmarket, he had been sent to investigate a woman accused of being a witch. Initially, he told her that he was a wizard and had come to discuss the Craft with her, and asked whether she had a familiar. She put down a saucer of milk and called to a toad which came out and drank the milk. He then sent her out to fetch some ale, killed the toad and dissected it, concluding that it was a perfectly ordinary animal and not supernatural in any way. When the woman returned she was naturally very angry and upset, but Harvey eventually silenced her by stating that he was the King's Physician, sent to discover whether she was a witch, and if she were, to have her apprehended.

=== Excursions abroad, election as physician to Charles I and the English Civil War ===
At the age of fifty-two, Harvey received commands from the king to accompany the Duke of Lennox during his trip abroad. This voyage – the first after Harvey's return from Padua – lasted three years, taking Harvey through the countries of France and Spain during the Mantuan War and Plague. During this journey he wrote to Viscount Dorchester:

I can complain that by the way we could scarce see a dog, crow, kite, raven or any other bird, or anything to anatomize, only some few miserable people, the relics of the war and the plague where famine had made anatomies before I came. It is scarce credible in so rich, populous, and plentiful countries as these were that so much misery and desolation, poverty and famine should in so short a time be, as we have seen. I interpret it well that it will be a great motive for all here to have and procure assurance of settled peace. It is time to leave fighting when there is nothing to eat, nothing to be kept, and nothing to be gotten.

Having returned to England in 1632. Harvey accompanied King Charles I wherever he went as 'Physician in Ordinary'. In particular, Charles's hunting expeditions gave Harvey access to many deer carcasses; it was upon them that Harvey made many observations and developed his theories. Harvey returned to Italy in October 1636, dining at the English College, Rome, as a guest of the Jesuits there. It is possible he met Galileo in Florence en route.

During the English Civil War a mob of citizen-soldiers opposed to the King entered Harvey's lodgings, stole his goods, and scattered his papers. The papers consisted of "the records of a large number of dissections ... of diseased bodies, with his observations on the development on insects, and a series of notes on comparative anatomy." During this period, Harvey maintained his position, helped the wounded on several occasions and protected the King's children during the Battle of Edgehill.

The conflicts of the Civil War soon led King Charles to Oxford, with Harvey attending, where the physician was made "Doctor of Physic" in 1642 and later Warden of Merton College in 1645. "In Oxford he (Harvey) very soon settled down to his accustomed pursuits, unmindful of the clatter of arms and of the constant marching and countermarching around him, for the city remained the base of operations until its surrender... "

=== Harvey's later years, death and burial ===
The surrender of Oxford in 1646 marks the beginning of Harvey's gradual retirement from public life and duties. Now sixty-eight years old and childless, Harvey had lost three brothers and his wife by this time. He thus decided to return to London, and lived with his brothers Eliab and Daniel at different periods. Having retired from St Bartholomew's Hospital and his various other aforementioned positions, he passed most of this time reading general literature. Several attempts to bring Harvey back into the 'working world' were made, however; here is an excerpt of one of Harvey's answers:

Would you be the man who should recommend me to quit the peaceful haven where I now pass my life and launch again upon the faithless sea? You know full well what a storm my former lucubrations raised. Much better is it oftentimes to grow wise at home and in private, than by publishing what you have amassed with infinite labour, to stir up tempests that may rob you of peace and quiet for the rest of your days.

Harvey died at Roehampton in the house of his brother Eliab on 3 June 1657. Descriptions of the event seem to show that he died of a cerebral haemorrhage from vessels long injured by gout: it is highly probable that the left middle cerebral artery malfunctioned, leading to a gradual accumulation of blood in the brain which eventually overwhelmed it. There exists a fairly detailed account of what happened on that day. Harvey

went to speak and found that he had the dead palsy in his tongue; then he saw what was to become of him. He knew there were then no hopes of his recovery, so presently he sends for his young nephews to come up to him. He then made signs (for seized with the dead palsy in his tongue he could not speak) to let him blood his tongue, which did him little or no good, and so ended his days, dying in the evening of the day on which he was stricken, the palsy giving him an easy passport.

His will distributed his material goods and wealth throughout his extended family and also left a substantial amount of money to the Royal College of Physicians. Harvey bequeathed coffee worth £56 to them dictating that they should meet monthly and commemorate his death with coffee.

Harvey was buried in St. Andrew's Church in Hempstead in northern Essex. The funeral procession started on 26 June 1657, leading Harvey to be placed in the 'Harvey Chapel' built by Eliab. The conditions of Harvey's burial are also known: "Harvey was laid in the chapel between the bodies of his two nieces, and like them he was lapt in lead, coffin less". On St. Luke's Day, 18 October 1883, Harvey's remains were reinterred, the leaden case carried from the vault by eight Fellows of the College of Physicians, and deposited in a sarcophagus containing his works and an inscription:

The body of William Harvey lapt in lead, simply soldered, was laid without shell or enclosure of any kind in the Harvey vault of this Church of Hempstead, Essex, in June 1657. In the course of time the lead enclosing the remains was, from expose and natural decay, so seriously damaged as to endanger its preservation, rendering some repair of it the duty of those interested in the memory of the illustrious discoverer of the circulation of the Blood. The Royal College of Physicians, of which corporate body Harvey was a munificent Benefactor did in the years 1882–1883, by permission of the Representatives of the Harvey family, undertake this duty. In accordance with this determination the leaden mortuary chest containing the remains of Harvey was repaired, and was, as far as possible, restored to its original state...

== De Motu Cordis ==
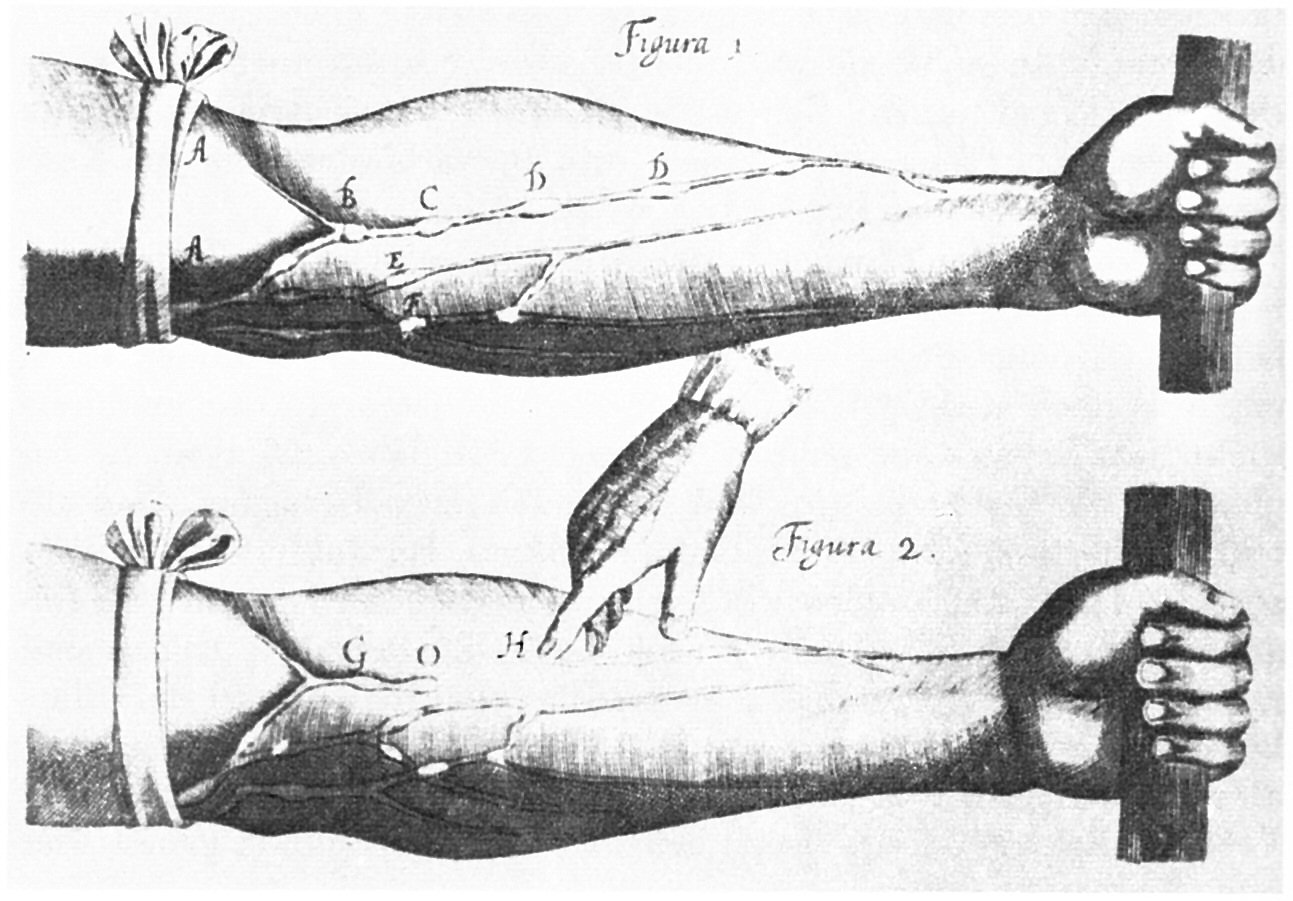
An experiment from Harvey's de Motu Cordis

Published in 1628 in the city of Frankfurt (host to an annual book fair that Harvey knew would allow immediate dispersion of his work), the 72-page Exercitatio Anatomica de Motu Cordis et Sanguinis in Animalibus contains the mature account of the circulation of the blood. Opening with a dedication to King Charles I, the quarto has 17 chapters which give a clear and connected account of the action of the heart and the consequent movement of the blood around the body in a circuit. Having only a tiny lens at his disposal, Harvey was not able to reach the images that were attained through such microscopes used by Antonie van Leeuwenhoek; thus he had to resort to theory – and not practical evidence – in certain parts of his book. After the first chapter, which simply outlines past ideas and accepted rules regarding the heart and lungs, Harvey moves on to a fundamental premise to his treatise, stating that it was important to study the heart when it was active in order to truly comprehend its true movement; a task which even he found of great difficulty, as he says:

...I found the task so truly arduous... that I was almost tempted to think... that the movement of the heart was only to be comprehended by God. For I could neither rightly perceive at first when the systole and when the diastole took place by reason of the rapidity of the movement...

This initial thought led Harvey's ambition and assiduousness to a detailed analysis of the overall structure of the heart (studied with fewer hindrances in cold-blooded animals). After this, Harvey analyses the arteries, showing how their pulsation depends upon the contraction of the left ventricle, while the contraction of the right ventricle propels its charge of blood into the pulmonary artery. Whilst doing this, the physician reiterates the fact that these two ventricles move together almost simultaneously and not independently as had been thought previously by his predecessors. This discovery was made while observing the heart of such animals as the eel and several other types of fish; indeed, the general study of countless animals was of utmost importance to Harvey's research: among the ones already cited, one can add the study of the snail, the miniature shrimp, the chick before its hatching and even the pigeon. A digression to an experiment can be made to this note: using the inactive heart of a dead pigeon and placing upon it a finger wet with saliva, Harvey was able to witness a transitory and yet incontrovertible pulsation. He had just witnessed the heart's ability to recover from fatigue. As early as the 17th century, William Harvey had already discerned the existence of the Ductus arteriosus and explained its relative function. Here he says, "...in embryos, whilst the lungs are in a state of inaction, performing no function, subject to no movement any more than if they had not been present, Nature uses the two ventricles of the heart as if they formed but one for the transmission of the blood." However, the apex of Harvey's work is probably the eighth chapter, in which he deals with the actual quantity of blood passing through the heart from the veins to the arteries. Coming into conflict with Galen's accepted view of the liver as the origin of venous blood, Harvey estimated the capacity of the heart, how much blood is expelled through each pump of the heart, and the number of times the heart beats in a half an hour. All of these estimates were purposefully low, so that people could see the vast amount of blood Galen's theory required the liver to produce. He estimated that the capacity of the heart was 1.5 imperial fluid ounces (43 ml), and that every time the heart pumps, 1/8 of that blood is expelled. This led to Harvey's estimate that about 1/6 imperial fluid ounce (4.7 ml) of blood went through the heart every time it pumped. The next estimate he used was that the heart beats 1,000 times every half an hour, which gave 10 pounds 6 ounces of blood in a half an hour, and when this number was multiplied by 48 half hours in a day he realised that the liver would have to produce 498 pounds of blood in a day, more than the weight of the whole body.

Having this simple but essential mathematical proportion at hand – which proved the overall impossible aforementioned role of the liver – Harvey went on to prove how the blood circulated in a circle by means of countless experiments initially done on serpents and fish: tying their veins and arteries in separate periods of time, Harvey noticed the modifications which occurred; indeed, as he tied the veins, the heart would become empty, while as he did the same to the arteries, the organ would swell up.

This process was later performed on the human body (in the image on the right): the physician tied a tight ligature onto the upper arm of a person. This would cut off blood flow from the arteries and the veins. When this was done, the arm below the ligature was cool and pale, while above the ligature it was warm and swollen. The ligature was loosened slightly, which allowed blood from the arteries to come into the arm, since arteries are deeper in the flesh than the veins. When this was done, the opposite effect was seen in the lower arm. It was now warm and swollen. The veins were also more visible since now they were full of blood. Harvey then noticed little bumps in the veins, which he realised were the valves of the veins discovered by his teacher, Hieronymus Fabricius. Harvey tried to push blood in the vein down the arm, but to no avail. When he tried to push it up the arm, it moved quite easily. The same effect was seen in other veins of the body, except the veins in the neck. Those veins were different from the others – they did not allow blood to flow up, but only down. This led Harvey to believe that the veins allowed blood to flow to the heart, and the valves maintained the one-way flow.

Contrary to a popular misconception, Harvey did not predict the existence of capillaries. His observations convinced him that direct connection between veins and arteries are unnecessary; he wrote "blood permeates the pores" in the flesh and it is "absorbed and imbibed from every part" by the veins.

Harvey's discovery of the circulation of the blood was based on inference, not direct observation, and was incompatible with the prevailing paradigm at the time. That paradigm held, among other things, that the blood could flow from one side of the heart to the other. Harvey knew that he was facing an uphill battle:

But what remains to be said about the quantity and source of the blood which thus passes, is of so novel and unheard-of character that I not only fear injury to myself from the envy of a few, but I tremble lest I have mankind at large for my enemies, so much doth want and custom, that become as another nature, and doctrine once sown and that hath struck deep root, and respect for antiquity, influence all men : still the die is cast, and my trust is in my love of truth, and the candour that inheres in cultivated minds.

Harvey's premonitions that his discovery would be met with scepticism, derision, and abuse, were entirely justified. It took twenty years for his theory of the circulation of the blood to be generally accepted.

== Views of the circulation of blood before Harvey ==
At the time of Harvey's publication, Galen had been an influential medical authority for several centuries. Galen believed that blood passed between the ventricles by means of invisible pores. According to Galen's views, the venous system was quite separate from the arterial system, except when they came in contact through the unseen pores. Arabic scholar Ibn al-Nafis had disputed aspects of Galen's views, providing a model that seems to imply a form of pulmonary circulation in his Commentary on Anatomy in Avicenna's Canon (1242). Al-Nafis stated that blood moved from the heart to the lungs, where it mixed with air, and then back to the heart, from which it spread to the rest of the body. Harvey's discoveries inevitably and historically came into conflict with Galen's teachings and the publication of his treatise De Motu Cordis incited considerable controversy within the medical community. Some doctors affirmed they would "rather err with Galen than proclaim the truth with Harvey." Galen incompletely perceived the function of the heart, believing it a "productor of heat", while the function of its affluents, the arteries, was that of cooling the blood as the lungs "...fanned and cooled the heart itself". Galen thought that during dilation the arteries sucked in air, while during their contraction they discharged vapours through pores in the flesh and skin.

Until the 17th century, two separate systems were thought to be involved in blood circulation: the natural system, containing venous blood which had its origin in the liver, and the vital system, containing arterial blood and the 'spirits' which flowed from the heart, distributing heat and life to all parts. Like bellows, it was thought the lungs fanned and cooled this vital blood.

Independently of Ibn Al-Nafis, Michael Servetus identified pulmonary circulation, but this discovery did not reach the public because it was written down for the first time in the Manuscript of Paris in 1546. It was later published in the theological work which caused his execution in 1553, almost all copies of which were destroyed. In: Christianismi Restitutio, Book V, the Aragonese Miguel Servet (Michel de Villeneuve, 1509?–1553) wrote: 'The blood is passed through the pulmonary artery to the pulmonary vein for a lengthy pass through the lungs, during which it becomes red, and gets rid of the sooty fumes by the act of exhalation'. Ideas on circulation of blood were also proposed by the Spanish veterinarian-farrier Francisco de la Reyna in 1546.

Pulmonary circulation was described by Renaldus Columbus, Andrea Cesalpino and Vesalius, before Harvey would provide a refined and complete description of the circulatory system.

== On Animal Generation ==
Harvey's other major work was Exercitationes de generatione animalium (On Animal Generation), published in 1651. He had been working on it for many years but might never have finished it without the encouragement of his friend George Ent.

The book starts with a description of the development of the hen's egg. The major part is theoretical, dealing with Aristotle's theories and the work of the physicians following Galen and up to Fabricius. Finally, he deals with embryogenesis in viviparous animals, especially hinds and does. The treatment is generally Aristotelian and limited by use of a simple magnifying lens.

Needham claims the following achievements for this work.

- His doctrine of omne vivum ex ovo (all life comes from the egg) was the first definite statement against the idea of spontaneous generation. He denied the possibility of generation from excrement and from mud, and pointed out that even worms have eggs.
- He identified the citricula as the point in the yolk from which the embryo develops and the blastoderm surrounding the embryo.
- He dismantled once and for all the Aristotelian (semen-blood) and Epicurean (semen-semen) theories of early embryogeny.
- He settled the long controversy about which parts of the egg were nutritive and which were formative, by demonstrating the unreality of the distinction.

== Legacy ==
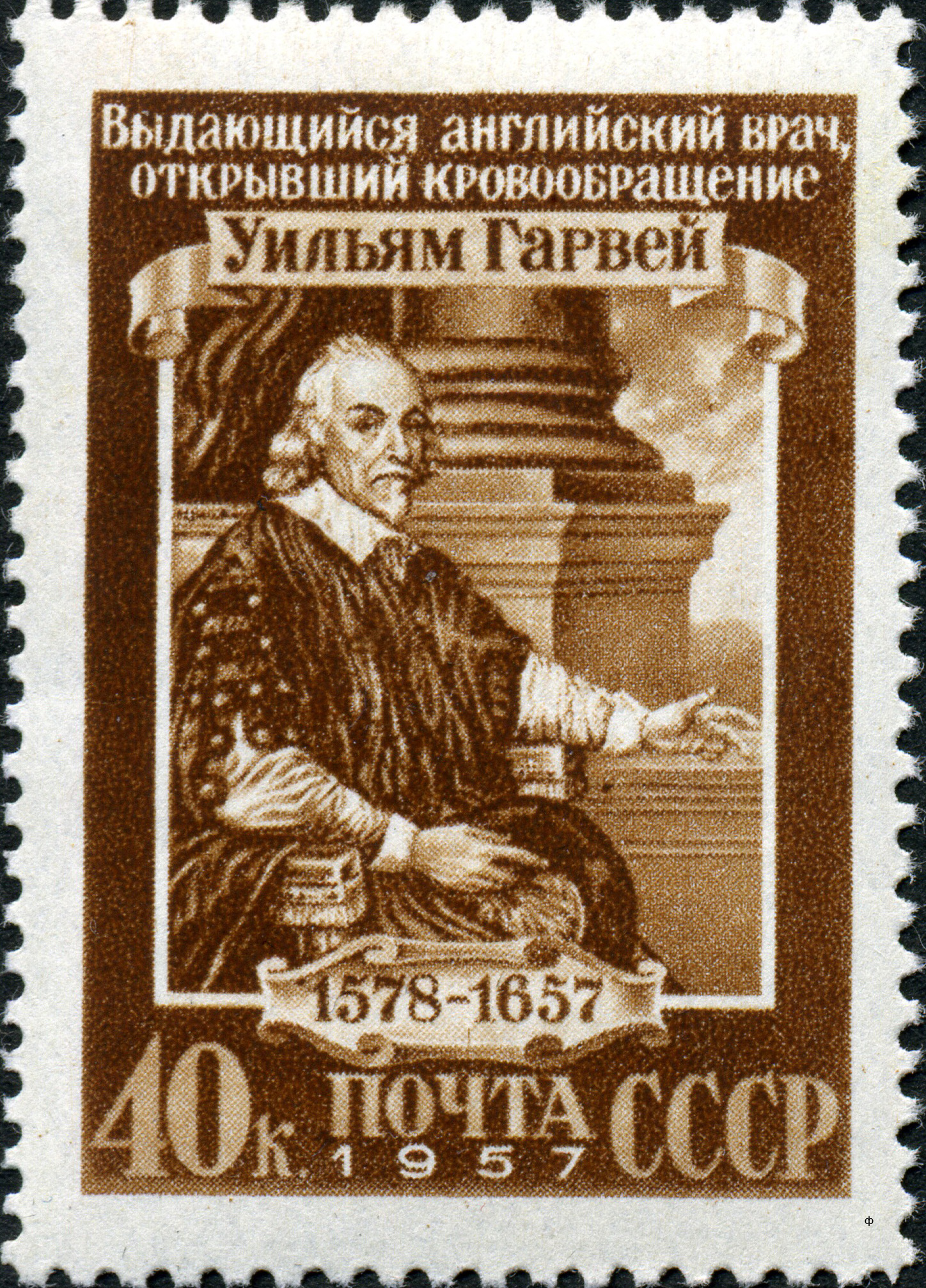
William Harvey on a 1957 Soviet postage stamp

Harvey's whalebone demonstration rod, tipped with silver, resides in the silver room of the museum of the Royal College of Physicians. He used it to point to objects during his lectures.

Several medical buildings and institutions are named after or otherwise commemorate Harvey. The Harveian Society of Edinburgh was founded in 1782 by Dr Andrew Duncan. The society holds an annual festival in honour of Harvey where the president of the society delivers the Harveian Oration, followed by a formal dinner. The venue for the festival alternates between the Royal College of Physicians of Edinburgh and the Royal College of Surgeons of Edinburgh. The Harveian Society of London is a medical society founded in 1831 based in The Medical Society of London, Chandos Street, in Cavendish Square. The Royal College of Physicians of London holds an annual lecture established by William Harvey in 1656 called the Harveian Oration. The Harvey Club of London was founded in Canada in 1919 and is based in the University of Western Ontario. The Harvey Society, found in 1905, is based in New York City and hosts an annual lecture series on recent advances in biomedical sciences. The main lecture theatre of the School of Clinical Medicine, University of Cambridge is named after William Harvey, who was an alumnus of the institute. William Harvey Research Institute at Barts and The London School of Medicine and Dentistry is a research facility focussing on biochemical pharmacology, orthopaedic diseases, endocrinology, genomics, clinical pharmacology and translational medicine and therapeutics. William Harvey Hospital in Ashford, Kent is named after him. Harvey's hometown of Folkestone, Kent also has a statue of him.

== Personality ==
Harvey was seen as a "...humorous but extremely precise man...", and that he was often so immersed in his own thoughts that he would often suffer from insomnia (cured with a simple walk through the house), and how he was always ready for an open and direct conversation. He also loved the darkness, for it is said that it was there where "...he could best contemplate", thus sometimes hiding out in caves. A heavy drinker of coffee, Harvey would walk out combing his hair every morning full of energy and enthusiastic spirit through the fields. We have also come to understand Harvey's somewhat unorthodox method of dealing with his gout, here cited completely: "...his [Harvey's] cure was thus: he would sit with his legs bare...put them into a pail of water till he was almost dead with cold, then betake himself to his stove, and so 'twas gone".

== Images ==
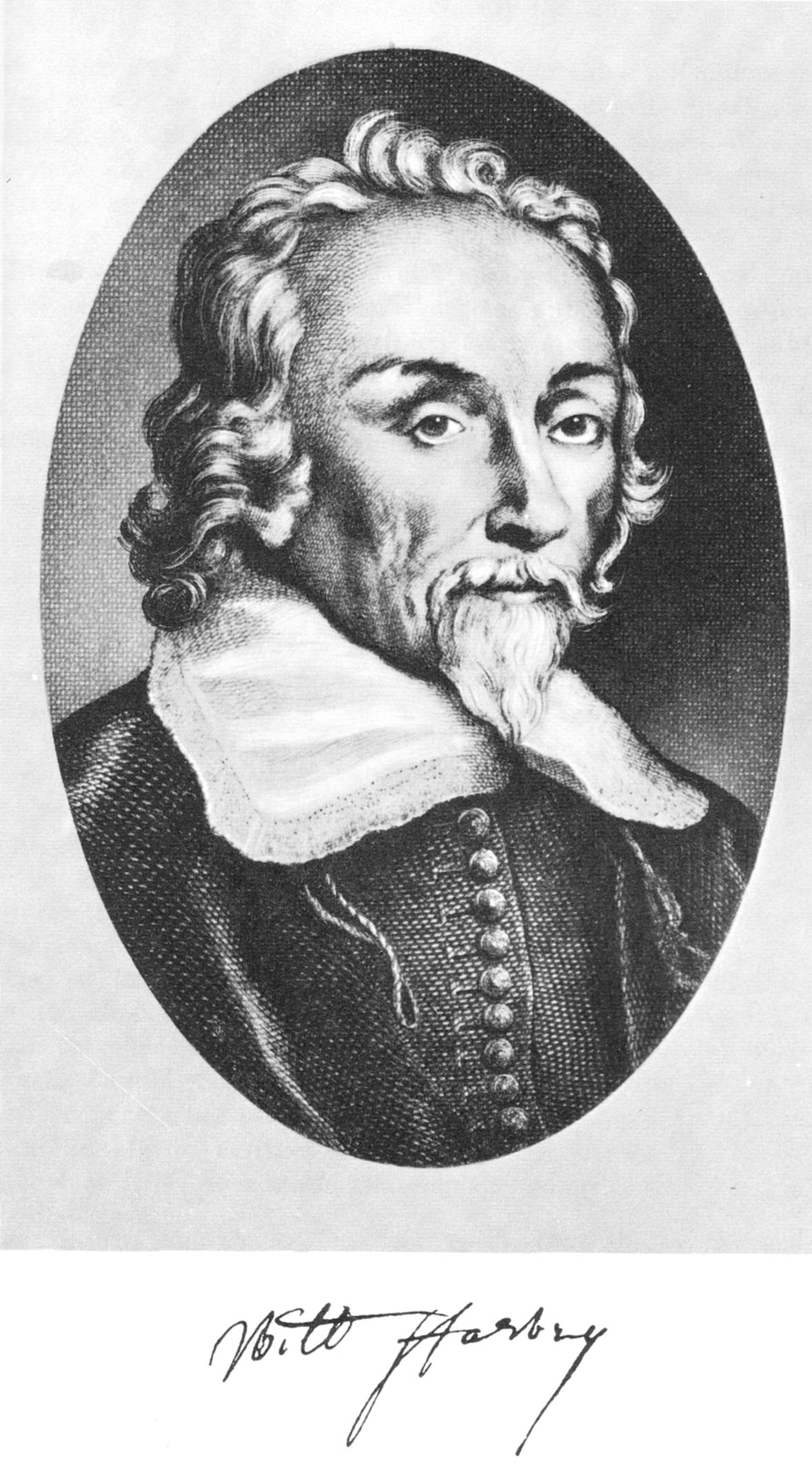
William Harvey

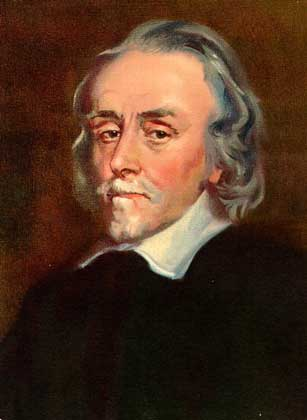
Colour portrait

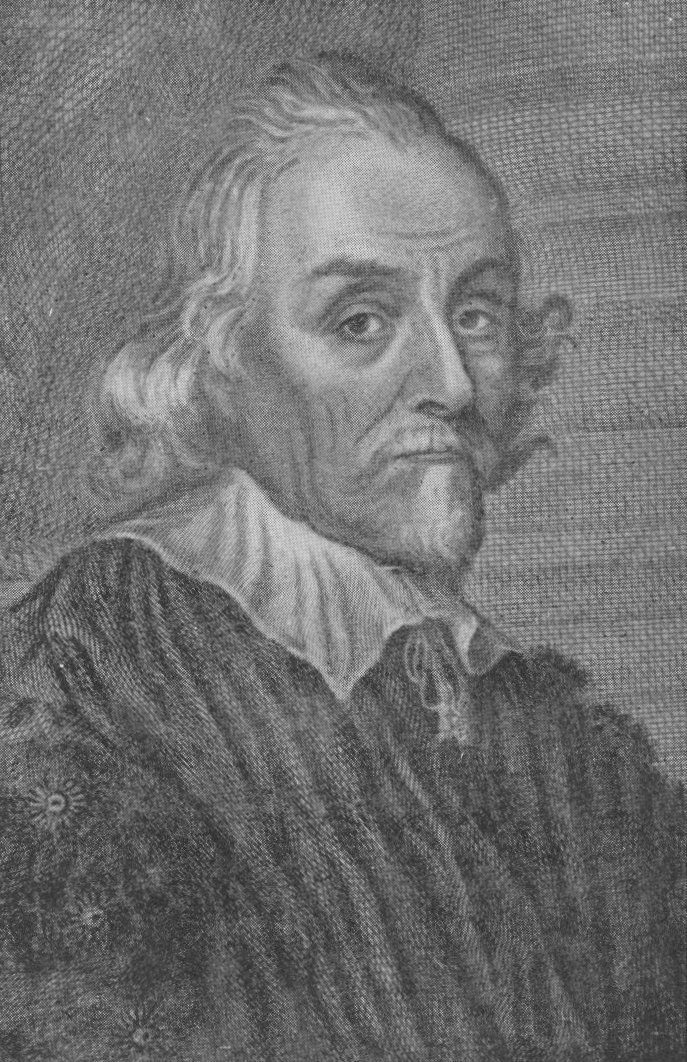
William Harvey, after a painting by Cornelius Jansen

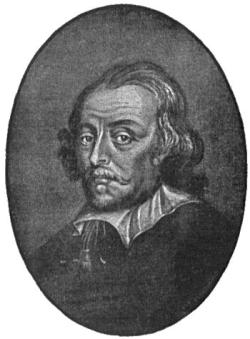
William Harvey

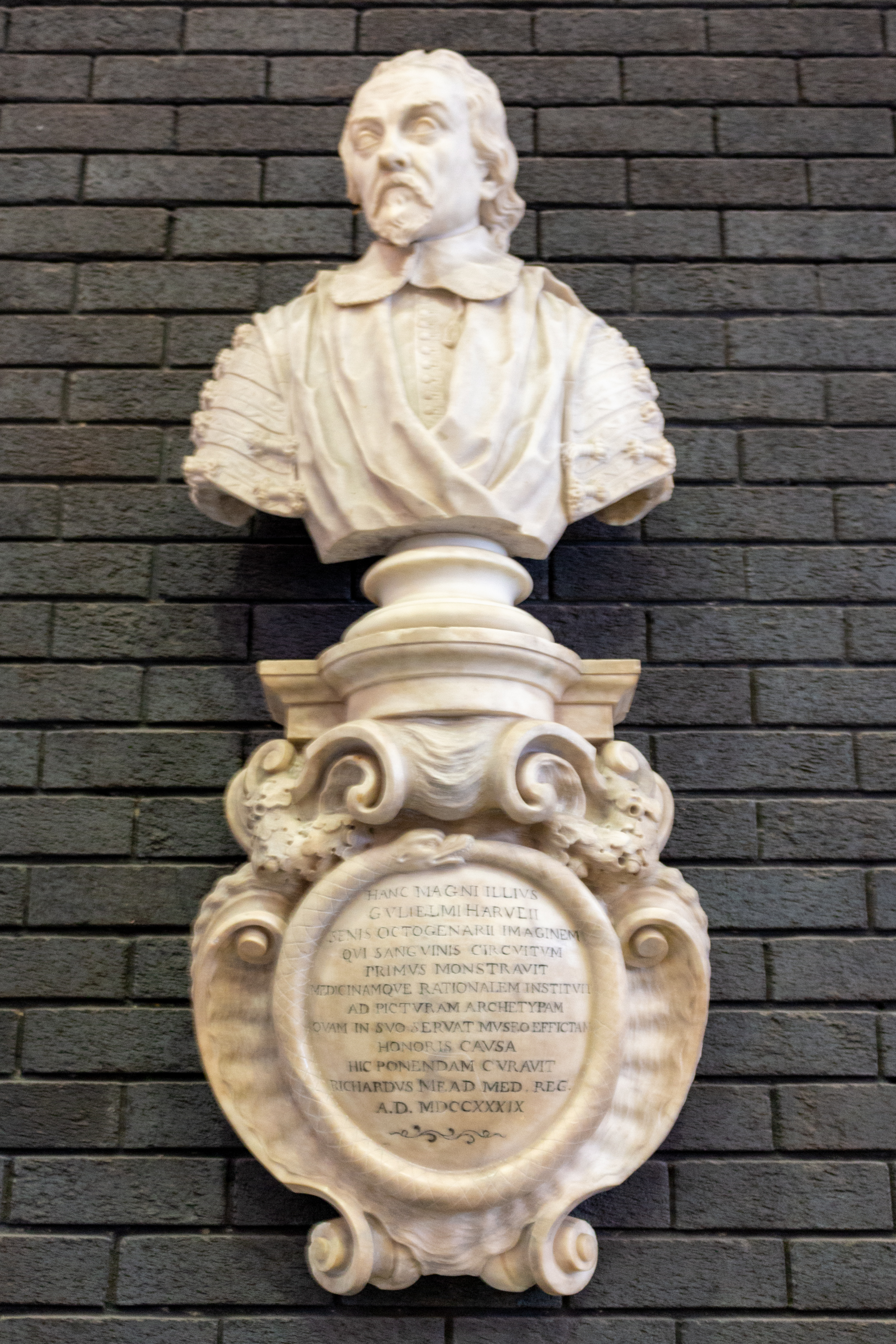
Bust of William Harvey at the Royal College of Physicians, London

== Works ==
- Harvey, William (1889). On the Motion of the Heart and Blood in Animals. London: George Bell and Sons. "william harvey."
- Harvey, William (1993). The Circulation of the Blood and Other Writings. Translated by Franklin, Kenneth J. London: Everyman: Orion Publishing Group. ISBN 0-460-87362-8.
- The Works of William Harvey. Translated by Robert Willis. London: Sydenham Society. 1847. Includes:
  - An anatomical disquisition on the motion of the heart and blood in animals
  - 2 disquisitions addressed to John Riolan, including refutations to objections to the circulation of the blood
  - Anatomical exercises on the generation of animals. To which are added:
    - On Parturition
    - On the uterine membranes and humours
    - On conception
  - Anatomical examination of the body of Thomas Parr
  - Letters

== See also ==
- Miguel Servet
- Amato Lusitano – Portuguese 16th-century physician, also credited with the discovery of the circulation of the blood
- Josephus Struthius
- Scientific Revolution
- List of multiple discoveries

== Bibliography ==
- Power, D'Arcy (1897). William Harvey: Masters of Medicine. T. Fisher Unwin. ISBN 978-1-4179-6578-6.

Academic offices
| Preceded by Nathaniel Brent | Warden of Merton College, Oxford; 1645–1648 | Succeeded by Nathaniel Brent |
