= Hempstead, Essex =

Village in Essex, England

Coordinates: 52°01′02″N 0°22′47″E

Hempstead
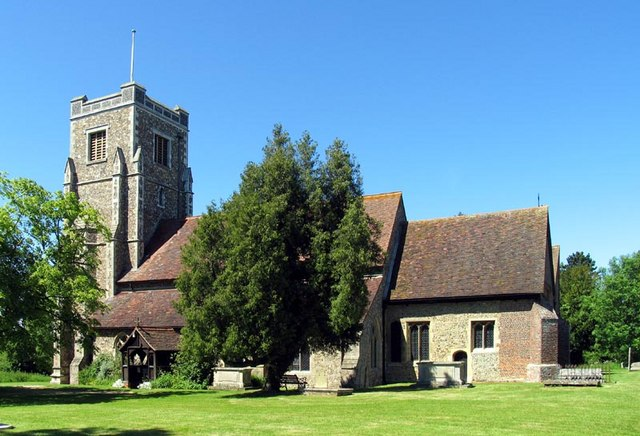
- St Andrew's Church

- Location within Essex
- Population: 431 (Parish, 2021)
- Civil parish: Hempstead
- District: Uttlesford
- Shire county: Essex
- Region: East
- Country: England
- Sovereign state: United Kingdom
- Post town: SAFFRON WALDEN
- Postcode district: CB10

Hempstead is a village and civil parish in the Uttlesford district of Essex, England. The village is 7 miles (11 km) east of Saffron Walden, its post town, and 6 miles (10 km) west of Haverhill. Hempstead is situated on the B1054 Saffron Walden to Steeple Bumpstead road. At the 2021 census the parish had a population of 431.

The village has one church, St. Andrew's, where William Harvey, who discovered the circulation of blood in the human body, and Sir Eliab Harvey, Captain of the Temeraire at the battle of Trafalgar, are interred.

The notorious highwayman Dick Turpin, was born in the village public house, where his father was landlord. He was baptised in the village church.

== History ==
Hempstead is mentioned in the Domesday Book as 'Hampsteda' ('village place'). Before the Norman Conquest, the land was held by the Saxon lord Withgar, however, it was passed by William the Conqueror to Richard fitz Gilbert who held the land per baroniam in return for the duty of providing soldiers on demand and attending the royal court. At the time of the conquest, there were 22 villagers, 10 smallholders and 7 slaves residing in the area.

The first Christian place of worship in the area is evidenced in a 1094 charter under William II of England. Described as a chapel, it was mentioned again in 1229, when it was dedicated to St Andrew. On the 8th of January 1365, St Andrew's Church was consecrated by Simon Sudbury.

Throughout the 13th to the 19th century, it has been argued that Hempstead was largely an agricultural community. In 1678 a post mill was built, and it has been attested that the wool industry was an important source of income for many villagers.

In the mid-19th century, a school was built and a steam mill came into use. In 1882, the church tower collapsed and was only restored to its former height in the mid 20th century.

=== 1952 Meteor crash ===
Flying Officer James Henry Catchpole, from RAF Duxford, crashed in Gloster Meteor 'WE937' of 64 Sqn on Friday 29 February 1952.

== See also ==
Hempstead Essex
The Hundred Parishes
