= James Crichton =

Scottish polymath (1560–1582)

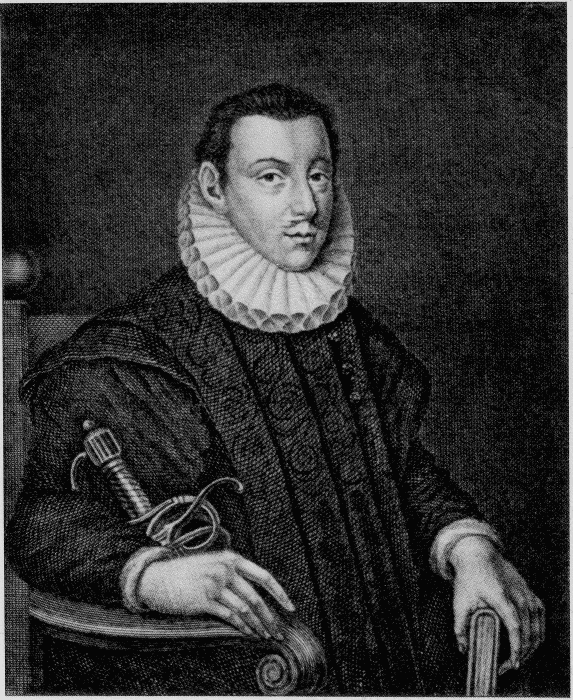
- The Admirable Crichton, as depicted in English Travellers of the Renaissance, a 1914 publication by Clare Howard
- Born: 19 August 1560; Clunie, Scotland
- Died: 3 July 1582 (aged 21); Mantua, Italy
- Other name: The Admirable Crichton
- Education: St Andrews University
- Alma mater: Collège de Navarre
- Occupation: Polymath

James Crichton, known as the Admirable Crichton (19 August 1560 – 3 July 1582), was an alleged Scottish polymath noted for his extraordinary accomplishments in languages, the arts, and sciences before he was murdered at the age of 21.

== Early life and education ==
James Crichton was born on 19 August 1560, the son of Robert Crichton of Eliok, Lord Advocate of Scotland and Elizabeth Stewart, a sister of James Stewart, 1st Lord Doune. He was said to be from Clunie, in Perthshire, although some sources maintain his birthplace was Dumfries.

One of the most gifted individuals of the 16th century, Crichton was educated at St Andrews University between the ages of 10 and 14, during which time he completed requirements for both his bachelor's and master's degrees. Crichton was taught by the celebrated Scottish scholar, politician, and poet George Buchanan (1506–1582). It was apparent from his earliest days that he was an unusually gifted prodigy, which may have been associated with a gift for perfect recall.

By the age of 20, he was not only fluent in, but could discourse in (both prose and verse) 12 languages, as well as being an accomplished horseman, fencer, singer, musician, orator, and debater. Noted for his good looks as well as his refined social graces, he was considered to have come closest to the ideal of the complete man.

Leaving Scotland, Crichton travelled to Paris, where he continued his education at the Collège de Navarre. It was in the French capital that he first came to prominence by challenging French professors to ask him any question on any science or liberal arts subject in Arabic, Dutch, English, French, Greek, Hebrew, Italian, Latin, Slavonic, Spanish, or Syriac. It is said that throughout the course of one extremely long day, French scholars failed to stump Crichton on any question they threw at him, no matter how abstruse.

== Travel to Italy ==
Thereafter he spent two years as a soldier in the French army before travelling to Italy in 1579, winning acclaim in Genoa, Venice, and Padua by repeating his exploit of challenging Italian scholars to intellectual discourse and debate.

In Venice in 1580, Crichton befriended the printer Aldus Manutius the Younger, who introduced him to the Venetian intellectual community, where the young Scot made an enormous impression on humanist scholars. In Padua in 1581, he clashed with a number of scholars over their interpretation of Aristotle, while demonstrating that their mathematics were flawed.

Perhaps tiring of intellectual duels, the following year Crichton entered the service of Guglielmo Gonzaga the Duke of Mantua, and may have become tutor to the Duke's son Vincenzo Gonzaga (although some sources suggest that Crichton served only as a member of the ducal council, and did not actually teach the prince).

== Death in Mantua ==
While Crichton was in the Duke's employ, Vincenzo Gonzaga became extremely jealous of him, probably from a combination of his father's strong regard for the young prodigy as well as Crichton replacing Vincenzo as the lover of the prince's former mistress.

On the night of 3 July 1582, after leaving this lady's dwelling in Mantua, Crichton was attacked in the street by a gang of masked ruffians. He bested all but one with his sword, until the last man removed his mask to reveal the group's ringleader, Vincenzo Gonzaga himself. Tradition holds that, on seeing Vincenzo, Crichton instantly dropped to one knee and presented his sword, hilt first, to the prince, his master's son. Vincenzo took the blade and with it stabbed Crichton through the heart, killing him instantly at the age of 21.

== Reputation and legacy ==
Much of Crichton's posthumous reputation comes from a romantic 1652 account of his life written by Sir Thomas Urquhart (1611–1660), contained within an unclassifiable work (The Jewel) that is characterised by exaggeration and hyperbole. There is little or no contemporary evidence for many of the stories surrounding him.

His existence is supported by a few letters, and his actual abilities were probably impressive, enough that his story has not been lost through the centuries since his death. Samuel Johnson devoted the 14 August 1753 issue of the periodical The Adventurer to the story of Crichton, writing, "Among the favourites of nature that have from time to time appeared in the world, enriched with various endowments and contrarieties of excellence, none seems to have been [more] exalted above the common rate of humanity, than the man known about two centuries ago by the appellation of the Admirable Crichton".

An historical novel entitled Crichton was published by the English writer William Harrison Ainsworth in 1837. "The Admirable Crichton" is referred to by Charles Dickens in his 1859 story collection The Haunted House. The "Admirable Crichton" was mentioned as an exemplar in W. M. Thackeray's Vanity Fair (1847) and referenced in chapter 3 of Anthony Trollope's The Prime Minister (1876).

Fellow Scot Sir James Barrie's 1902 satirical play, The Admirable Crichton, is about a butler whose savoir-faire far exceeds that of his aristocratic employers. The Admirable Crichton is also referenced in Some Do Not..., the first of Ford Madox Ford's tetralogy about World War I.

There are memorials to Crichton in the church of St. Bride's in Sanquhar and in the church of San Simone in Mantua. He is also the namesake of the James Crichton Society at St Andrews University which publishes a monthly academic journal.
