= George Edgar (writer) =

English writer

- Born: June 11, 1877; Warrington
- Died: April 1918 (aged 40); Ramsgate
- Occupation: Writer
- Spouse: Jeannie Howard
- Children: one son, three daughters
- Parent: Peter Edgar

George Edgar (11 June 1877 – April 1918) was an English writer and journalist.

== Career ==
After working with local newspapers, he found employment with London journals, and became editor or associate editor of "Modern Business" [1909], "Careers" [1910-11] and "Advertizers’ Weekly". He wrote and contributed widely, including many fictional works.

== Personal life ==
Edgar was the eldest son of Peter Edgar, of Warrington, married the youngest daughter of Thomas D Howard, of Dewsbury, and had four children. In his later life, he lived in Ramsgate.

== Published works ==
- The Blue Bird's Eye. 1912.
- Martin Harvey. 1912.
- Swift Nick of the New York Road. 1913.
- The Red Colonel. 1913.
- The Pride of Fancy. 1914.
- Kent, the Fighting Man. 1916.
- Honours of War. 1916.
