= Rookwood (novel) =

1834 novel by William Harrison Ainsworth

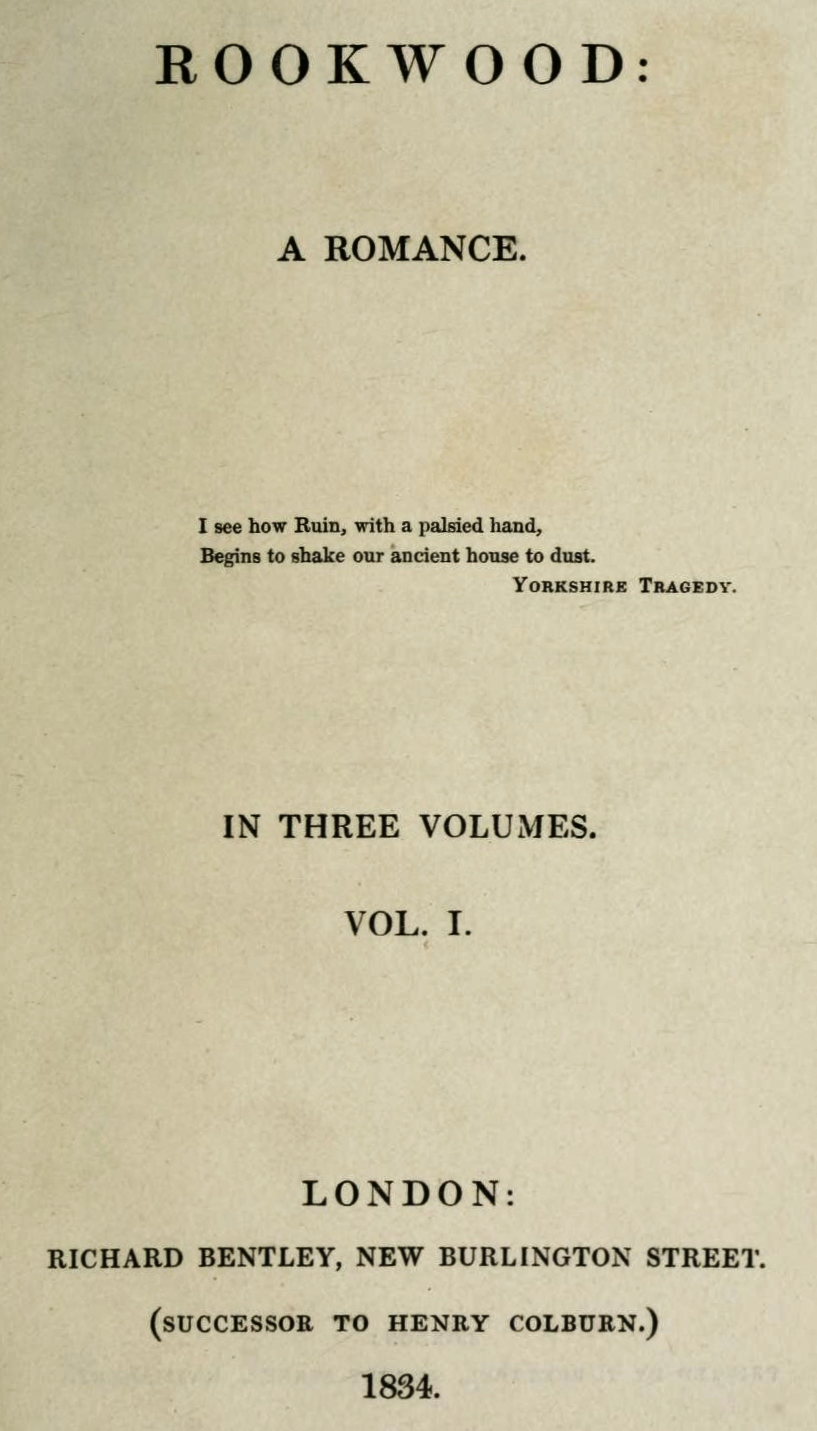
- First edition title page
- Author: Ainsworth
- Publication date: 1834
- Publication place: England

Rookwood is a novel by William Harrison Ainsworth published in 1834. It is a historical and gothic romance that describes a dispute over the legitimate claim for the inheritance of Rookwood Place and the Rookwood family name.

== Background ==
Ainsworth began to develop the idea of writing a novel in 1829. In a letter to James Crossley during that May, Ainsworth inquired about information about Gypsies and eulogies. By 1830, he began to work for the Fraser's Magazine and was with the magazine when he started writing Rookwood in 1831. A preface to the 1849 edition of the novel discusses the origins and development of the novel: "During a visit to Chesterfield, in the autumn of the year 1831, I first conceived the notion of writing this story. Wishing to describe, somewhat minutely, the trim gardens, the picturesque domains, the rook-haunted groves, the gloomy chambers, and gloomier galleries, of an ancient Hall with which I was acquainted."

The locations Ainsworth refers to is the home of his cousin's wife in Chesterfield and the ancient hall belonged to a friend who lived in Cuckfield Place, Sussex. Ainsworth used the settings in combination with his work for his previous novel, Sir John Chiverton. The work was completed in 1834, and Rookwood, A Romance was published in three volumes by Richard Bentley with illustrations by George Cruikshank. The novel disappeared from bookshops after World War II and a restriction on the use of paper.

== Plot ==
The action of the novel takes place in England in 1737. At a manor called Rookwood Place, a legend claims that when a branch of an ancient tree breaks, a death will follow. After a branch does fall from the tree, Piers Rookwood, the owner, dies. It is revealed to Luke Bradley that he is the son, and therefore the heir, of Piers; and also that Piers had murdered Bradley's mother. This knowledge comes to Bradley while he stands near his mother's coffin, which falls and opens at the moment of revelation. During the fall, it can be seen that she is wearing a wedding ring, which suggests that Bradley is not illegitimate. However, the entire incident has been orchestrated by Peter Bradley, the boy's grandfather. Meanwhile, Rookwood's wife, Maud Rookwood, initiates her own scheme to ensure that her son, Ranulph Rookwood, is able to claim the inheritance.

As events unfold, Bradley falls in love with Eleanor Mowbray – but she is in love with her cousin, Ranulph Rookwood. At his grandfather's prompting, Bradley abandons his love, a gypsy named Sybil Lovel, to pursue and try to force Mowbray into marriage. Dick Turpin, a highwayman and thief, is introduced at the manor, under the pseudonym Palmer. While there, he makes a bet with one of the guests that he can capture himself. Eventually, Turpin is forced to escape on his horse, Black Bess. The horse, though fast enough to keep ahead of all other horses, eventually collapses and dies under the stress of the escape. Later, Turpin reappears and tries to help Bradley win Eleanor's hand in marriage, but Bradley is fooled into marrying Sybil instead, Eleanor having been taken by the gypsies. Soon afterwards, Sybil kills herself. To avenge her death, Sybil's family poisons a lock of hair and gives it to Bradley, which results in his death.

Following the death of his grandson, Peter Bradley admits his true identity: he is Alan Rookwood, the brother of Reginald Rookwood, father to Piers. Alan confronts Maud Rookwood, and the two attack each other in the Rookwood family tomb. However, they activate a mechanism that causes the tomb to shut and imprison them together forever. In the end, the only surviving family members, Ranulph Rookwood and Eleanor Mowbray marry.

=== Characters ===
- Piers Rookwood
- Lady Maud Rookwood
- Ranulph Rookwood
- Luke Bradley
- Susan Bradley
- Peter Bradley/Alan Rookwood
- Sybil Lovel
- Elanor Mowbray
- Dick Turpin

=== Illustrations ===
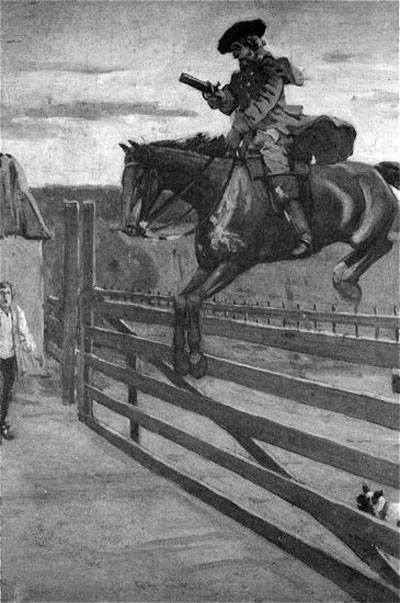
Dick Turpin and his horse Black Bess clear Hornsey Tollgate.

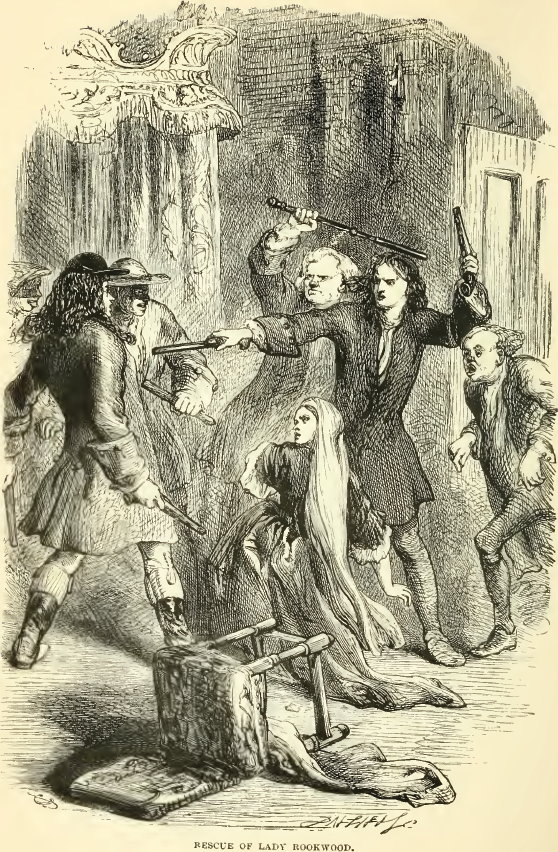
Rescue of Lady Rookwood.

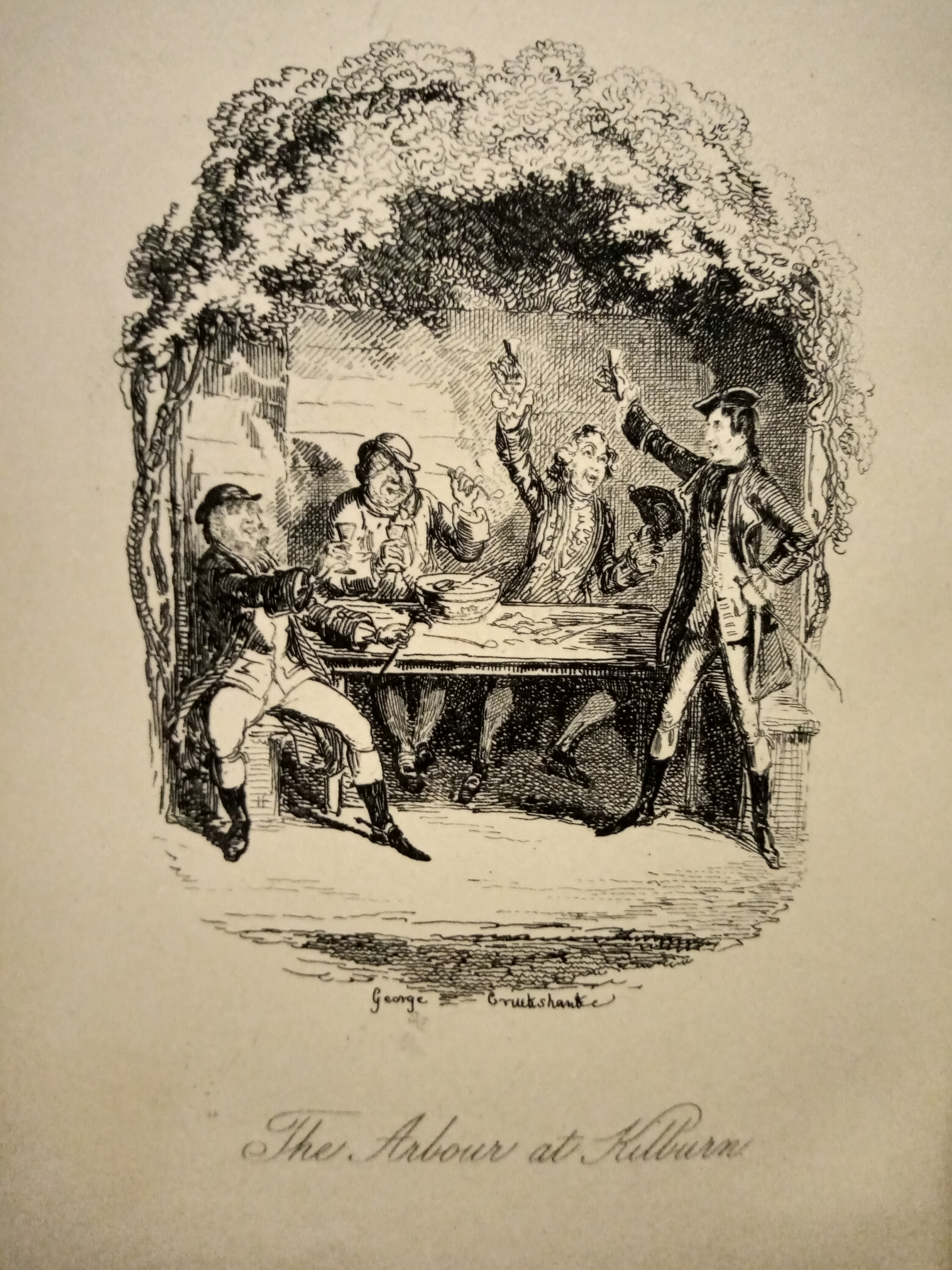
The Arbour at Kilburn.

== Themes ==
Ainsworth employs many genres within Rookwood. The novel follows Horace Walpole's The Castle of Otranto in its use of the gothic genre, an action which helped revive the gothic genre in British literature. However, Ainsworth did not rely on many of the clichés of gothic fiction, in addition to moving the setting of the story from medieval Europe to contemporary England. Ainsworth explained this in his preface to Rookwood: "I resolved to attempt a story in the bygone style of Mrs. Radcliffe [...] substituting an old English highwayman, for the Italian marchese, the castle, and the brigand of the great mistress of Romance."

The gothic elements were merged with the use of historical figures, such as Turpin. In its use of highwaymen, the novel is similar to works such as John Gay's The Beggar's Opera, Henry Fielding's Jonathan Wild, Friedrich Schiller's play The Robbers, and Edward Bulwer-Lytton's Paul Clifford and Eugene Aram. Additionally, Rookwood join's Lytton's novels in being classified as Newgate novels, works published during the early 19th century that focus on the life of famous criminals. In terms of tradition, the novel is related to the works of Horace Walpole and 'Monk' Lewis in its reliance on the supernatural.

The characters of Rookwood take pleasure in the ruin of others. The characters seek out power and indulge in lust, greed, and desires for revenge, which connects them to characters in gothic novels like Walpole's Manfred. The character Luke Bradley is first described in a positive manner, but he is truly corrupt. Ranulph Rookwood, however, is the opposite of Luke, but this causes his character to be less dynamic. Bradley is unpredictable, yet always after power. This, in addition to use of the fantastic within his gothic style, distances Rookwood from the works of both Sir Walter Scott and Mrs Radcliffe, as the latter two prefer a focus on psychology than external effects. Ainsworth relies on externals when he emphasises the idea of prophecy and prophecy's power over the characters.

Some of the characters are secondary and are used just to advance the plot. One such character is Turpin, but Turpin is described in a manner that makes him more lively than any of the other characters. The scene with Black Bess and the escape has little connection to the gothic elements of the novel, but it also appealed more to readers than the rest of the work. The appeal of the scene was to create a new legend about Turpin and his exploits, since Turpin was depicted as a likeable character who made the criminal life appealing. Included with the Turpin scenes and throughout the book are many songs that praise famous criminals in addition to other songs, with a total of 23 songs in the original edition of Rookwood and many more added in later editions. Of the other songs, some were sung by gypsies about love, some were hymns, and some were used to further the gothic setting.

== Sources ==
The name Rookwood alludes to the old Recusant (Roman Catholic) family of that name, most famous of whom was Ambrose Rookwood, executed in 1606 for his part in the Gunpowder Plot (the conspiracy which forms the theme of Ainsworth's 1841 novel Guy Fawkes). Ainsworth, perhaps consciously, paid a double homage to this family, in that his later historical romance The Spendthrift concerns an eighteenth-century heir of the Gage family of Hengrave Hall in Suffolk. John Gage of Hengrave, a descendant in his maternal line from Ambrose Rookwood, was Director of the Society of Antiquaries of London from 1829 to 1842. Gage, also a prominent Catholic, was therefore one of the most distinguished English Antiquaries at the time when Ainsworth published his historical romance of Rookwood in 1834. When Gage inherited the Rookwood estates in 1838 he assumed for himself the surname 'Rokewode', and he died in 1842 at the Fitzherbert family seat of Claughton Hall in Lancashire. The Spendthrift appeared in print some years later.

The character Dick Turpin in the novel Rookwood was based on a real historical person, a highway robber who used pseudonyms to keep the company of gentlemen, and became the legendary type of the English highwayman. An important section of the novel is a dramatic re-telling of Dick Turpin's famous (and fictional) Ride to York. One story involved Turpin and Thom King, a man Turpin attempted to rob and instead befriended. However, Turpin ended up killing King when trying to kill a constable who was after them. He was eventually arrested for stealing horses, and was executed in 1739.

== Critical response ==
The initial response from the literary public was positive, and Ainsworth immediately became famous with the novel's publication. In a letter to Crossley dated 6 May 1834, Ainsworth claimed, "The book is doing famously well here – making, in fact, quite a sensation. It has been praised in quarters of which you can have no idea – for instance, by Sir James Scarlett and Lord Durham. I have also received a most flattering letter from Bulwer-Lytton, and it has been the means of introducing me to Lady Blessington and her soirees. In fact, as Byron says, I went to bed unknown, arose, and found myself famous. Bentley has already begun to speak of a second edition – he wants to advertise in all the papers"."

An immediate review in The Quarterly Review said, "His story is one that never flags" and "we expect much from this writer". A review in The Spectator claimed that the work was "Written with great vigour and wonderful variety". The Atlas ran a review which stated, "It is long since such a work as this has been produced – the author exhibits ability of no ordinary kind."

In terms of classification and judgment, Leo Mason, in 1939, claimed that "Rookwood, Jack Sheppard, and Crichton [...] are historical romances and must take their chances as such." Keith Hollingsworth, in his 1963 analysis of the Newgate novels, declared, "Rookwood is a story by Mrs. Radcliffe transplanted [...] ' Substituting' is the accurate word for Ainsworth's process. There is probably no single item of originality in all the profession of Gothic elements." In 1972, George Worth argued for the importance of the gothic elements in Rookwood: "There is no better representative of the Gothic strain in Ainsworth's work than Rookwood [...] which begins with shudders that do not often abate as the novel continues. David Punter, in 1996, as focused on the novel as part of the gothic genre when he argued that Rookwood and Jack Sheppard "are important only as another link in the uneven chain which leads from Godwin, via Lytton, onto Reynolds and Dickens, and which thus produces a form of Gothic connected with the proletarian and the contemporary."

In 2003, Stephen Carver argued, "Rookwood was one of the most successful novels of the nineteenth century. The fact that it has now been largely forgotten is in part an indication of the dynamic nature of literary production during this period, the star of 1834–5, Ainsworth, being rapidly eclipsed by Dickens in 1836." He continued by pointing out, "Stylistically, Rookwood is a wonderful enthusiastic amalgam: blending gothic with Newgate, historical romance with underworld anti-heroes, 'flash' dialogue and song, all luridly illustrated by George Cruikshank. This was what made Rookwood such a novelty in 1838 although, in many ways, the parts could be said to be greater than the whole."
