= Pushbutton =

Pushbutton was a UK-based digital agency specialising in designing, developing, and delivering interactive television. Pushbutton was acquired by Amazon.com on 28 July 2011 and many of its staff are now members of Amazon Development Centre (London) Ltd.

== History and origins ==
The company was founded as "Push Button Limited" in 2002 by former executives of BSkyB Sheila Creak, and Paula Byrne and Aly Khalifa (who remains Managing Director).

Prior to setting up Pushbutton, Paula Byrne led the team responsible for delivering interactive applications and services on the Open.... interactive television platform, which subsequently evolved into Sky Active after Sky bought out the other partners in the Open.... venture (BT, Matsushita, and HSBC).

In 2004, James Cumberbatch, also ex-BSkyB joined the company as Development Director, and became a co-owner of the company; in the same year the company established a design studio in Brighton. Since then more ex-BSkyB staff have been added to the development and design teams, and the company has branched out into interactive advertising, and the creation of complete interactive services for the likes of National Geographic Channel and Disney Channel.

In 2007 the company relocated operations from Brighton to Carlisle Street in Soho. Their main offices moved again early in 2008 to St John Street in Smithfield, London. They had a separate administrative office in Harpenden.

From 2007 to 2010 Pushbutton won some large pitches including work for Disney, National Geographic, Foxtel (Australia), Diagio, Sky, BBC, ITV and Camelot.

On 22 March 2011, Pushbutton released two new products. pbRemote and pbTV.

On 23 March 2011, Pushbutton announced a new partnership with US music streaming site Grooveshark.

On 28 July 2011, Pushbutton was acquired by Amazon.com

== Technology ==
Interactive television services created by Pushbutton fell into two broad categories - digital satellite, and broadband.

Information about technologies for application delivery on internet-based platforms is widely available, both for services delivered via the public internet to traditional web browser client software (perhaps using Flash or AJAX), and those delivered on closed networks like BT Vision (which uses Microsoft's Mediaroom platform).

However, the digital satellite services Pushbutton created were chiefly designed to run on set-top boxes with the less-well-known OpenTV middleware, where Pushbutton's exposure to interactive TV technologies on "both sides of the fence" is notable.

=== Services on ITV ===
The earliest interactive applications accompanying ITV's shows on Sky were created in bespoke XML targeting a web browser-like application framework called GEOFF (Generic Application Framework). GEOFF was originally developed by Carlton Interactive Media at the time of the merger between Carlton and Granada.

Development of interactive services was subsequently simplified using a templated subset of GEOFF functionality created for ITV by TwoWayTV, and integrated with a Content Management System developed by Tamblin (now part of Alcatel-Lucent). Pushbutton staff assisted in the template development, and in steering the development of the GEOFF platform.

During 2007 ITV changed the underlying technology supporting their interactive services on Sky; ITV's most recent interactive services, as seen alongside shows like Loose Women are created using tools provided by Emuse amongst others.

=== Services on other channels ===
Pushbutton's developers have created interactive services on other digital satellite channels carried by BSkyB using a variety of approaches:

- Services created using OpenTV's SDK to run directly on the set-top box
- Services written in WTVML for deployment to the Sky-developed WapTV browser, or in XML to be transcoded for deployment to ITV's GEOFF browser
- Services that integrate with code libraries supplied by broadcasters (for example, both BSkyB and YooMedia supply custom wrappers for the set-top box HTTP API)
- Services broadcast via automated compilation and delivery systems (for example, Sky's ABB system, or ITV's Automated Broadcast Compiler)

=== Server integration ===
Sky's digital satellite set-top boxes house a 28.8k modem which is normally connected via the telephone network to proxy servers run by Sky or YooMedia; this connectivity allows interactive applications to communicate one-to-one with application servers dedicated to a particular interactive service, for the price of a phone call.

Where the phone call is made to a freephone number, the cost of the connection is borne by the providers of the interactive service, rather than by the consumer.

Pushbutton were involved in the creation of interactive services (or supporting CMS systems) exchanging data in XML or delimiter-separated text with:

- Gambling and fixed-odds gaming services
- Peer-to-peer chat services
- Television schedule databases
- Sporting event scores and results services
- Vote and competition aggregators

== Clients ==
Pushbutton's most prominent clients included Sky, Disney Channel, the National Geographic Channel, Kodak, and Guinness.

Their largest client for some years was UK broadcaster ITV. Between 2004 and 2007 Pushbutton designed and built interactive services for all of ITV’s biggest shows, including The X Factor, Coronation Street, I'm A Celebrity... Get Me Out Of Here!, Emmerdale, This Morning, and ITV's World Cup coverage.

They also completed work for BT Vision, BBC iPlayer, Microsoft Mediaroom, Virgin Interactive and LOVEFiLM (also acquired by Amazon in 2011).

== See also ==
- WapTV, originators of WTVML
- Orbis, providers of online gambling and gaming technology
