= Art Shield =

Organisation promoting Ukrainian art and artists

Art Shield is a nonprofit organization dedicated to protecting and nurturing art in conflict zones. The organization was started in 2022 by English-Franco actor and artist Edward Akrout following the Russian invasion of Ukraine, with its inaugural chapter focused on cultural preservation of Ukrainian art.

== Conception ==
Akrout first visited Ukraine in 2013 while filming the movie Bitter Harvest about the Holodomor. The filming coincided with the Revolution of Dignity, which Akrout described as "very transformative" in an interview with Art Newspaper

After Russia's full-scale invasion of Ukraine in 2022, Akrout returned to Kyiv and launched Art Shield with the assistance of Kathy Eldon at Creative Visions and the U.S. communications firm Paradox Public Relations.

== Art Shield's Cultural Initiatives ==
=== Kyiv Art Sessions ===
Art Shield hosted Kyiv Art Sessions throughout 2024 and 2025, a series of art festivals, at the Old Sessions House venue in London's Clerkenwell district. The festivals promoted around 30 Ukrainian artists, including Hanna Kryvolap, Akhtem Seitablayev, and Kharkiv street muralist Gamlet. The sessions also featured artwork from Sestry Feldman a prominent Ukrainian art duo that is known globally for their street art and murals.

The programme for Kyiv Art Sessions included a photo series from American-Ukrainian photographer Sasha Maslov, a presentation of the Ukrainian wine brand Deocoupage featuring grapes harvested from recently liberated Ukrainian territories such as Izium, and a solo show by the Ukrainian painter Oleksandr Dubovyk.

The Kyiv Art Sessions festivals were endorsed by Ukrainian Ambassador to the United Kingdom Valerii Zaluzhnyi as a "powerful testament to the unyielding spirit of Ukrainian art and culture."

PRovoke Media awarded Art Shield, Dom Master Klass, and Paradox Public Relations the SABRE North America 2025 gold award for "Educational and Cultural Institutions" for Kyiv Art Sessions. PR Daily named the campaign a finalist for Campaign of the Year at the 2025 Media Relations Awards.

=== Intermission ===
Art Shield is producing a documentary, titled Intermission, about Ukrainian actors who left their professions to join the Ukrainian Army.
