= TV Key =

A TV Key is a mechanism for any advertiser or content owner to link consumers to specific interactive television destinations, including enhanced TV applications, from media delivered over broadcast or broadband networks TV Keys can be embedded in any video stream and can be used as an on-screen call to action. TV Keys can also be displayed in newspaper advertisements and other printed collateral. A TV Key associates a brand or memorable word with a numeric code. Viewers enter the TV Key word by matching the letters to numbers on their television remote control.

A TV Key is a feature of the open, standards-based interactive TV services platform provided by Miniweb Interactive and can be used with interactive TV services over multiple television network types including satellite TV and digital terrestrial television. By entering a TV Key through their remote control, the television viewer can access additional video services or interactive content authored in wTVML and presented as a TV Site. For this reason, TV Keys have been described as “numeric shortcuts to online services that can be accessed through a television remote control”.

A TV Key is viewed as one element of a converged broadcast and broadband experience that provides personalized web-style interactivity for television viewers on the TV. It has been designed to encourage usage of an interactive television services and video.

TV Keys have been available since April 2008 on the UK satellite TV provider Sky Digital (BSkyB). The TV Key service is available to all Sky subscribers through the interactive menu and all channels. TV Keys allow broadcasters, television network operators, content owners and advertisers to deliver new services that monetize the way viewers interact with the television.

== See also ==
Key & See
