= Sasha Maslov =

Ukrainian-American photographer (born 1984)

- Саша Маслов
- Born: 1984 (age 41–42); Kharkiv
- Occupation: Photographer

Oleksandr Hennadiiovych Maslov (better known as Sasha Maslov; born 1984, Kharkiv) is a Ukrainian-American photographer.

== Biography ==
He learned photography from his father, Hennadii, and later from a teacher at the Kharkiv City Palace of Children and Youth Creativity, Oleh Shyshkov.

He has been living and working in New York from 2008.

Has photographed Sviatoslav Vakarchuk, Wladimir Klitschko, Pavlo Makov, Illya Chichkan, Petro Poroshenko, Elon Musk, David Lynch, Reese Witherspoon, Sarah Paulson, Jason Schwartzman, Mahershala Ali, Tom Ford, Marc Jacobs and others. His work has been published in The New York Times, CNN, New York Magazine, The New Yorker, The Guardian, Wall Street Journal Magazine, Esquire, Forbes, Billboard, Men's Health, and others.

Author of the books "Ukrainian Railroad Ladies" (2020), "Veterans: Faces of World War II" (2017), "Portrait Assignment", "Saints" (2024, co-author).

Personal exhibitions in Lviv (2016), Kharkiv (2016), Ann Arbor (2018), Kyiv (2016, 2020), Montpellier (2017, 2021), Cleveland (2021), New York (2011, 2017, 2021, 2022), Lima (2023); group meetings in Kraków (2007), Bratislava (2009), London (2012, 2020), Zamość (2015), Beijing (2016), Białystok (2017), Clermont-Ferrand (2017), Tbilisi (2017), Odesa (2017), Sarajevo (2017), Los Angeles (2017), Helsinki (2020).

== Saints Series ==
Maslov published the photo book 'Saints' with publisher Saint Javelin in 2024. The series depicts both everyday Ukrainians and high-profile Ukrainian figures as heroes, including Ukrainian President Volodymyr Zelenskyy and Alina Mykhailova, the widow of Ukrainian soldier Dmytro Kotsiubailo.

"The title itself is interpretive, but in this context, I wanted to call it "Saints" because the people whose stories are featured in this book have become saints for somebody. Each individual story represents personal sacrifice and sainthood. Ukrainians have sacrificed a lot in this war. People have put their own lives, families, businesses, and everything they had on the line to save others. Some have made the ultimate sacrifice, and each person, knowingly or unknowingly, becomes a saint for somebody, which is why the title is 'Saints.'"

Saints has been exhibited at the Ukrainian Institute of America in New York, and Art Shield's Kyiv Art Sessions festival at Middlesex Sessions House in London.

== Awards ==
- Winner (2021, 2022) and Favorites-Archive (2014) by AI-AP
- Juror Special Selection at LensCulture Exposure Awards (2020)
- Finalist of Sony World Photography Awards (2017, 2020)
- Finalist of Magnum Photography Awards (2017)
