= The Wrestlers, Hatfield =

Pub in Hatfield, Hertfordshire, England

Coordinates: 51°46′13″N 0°13′00″W

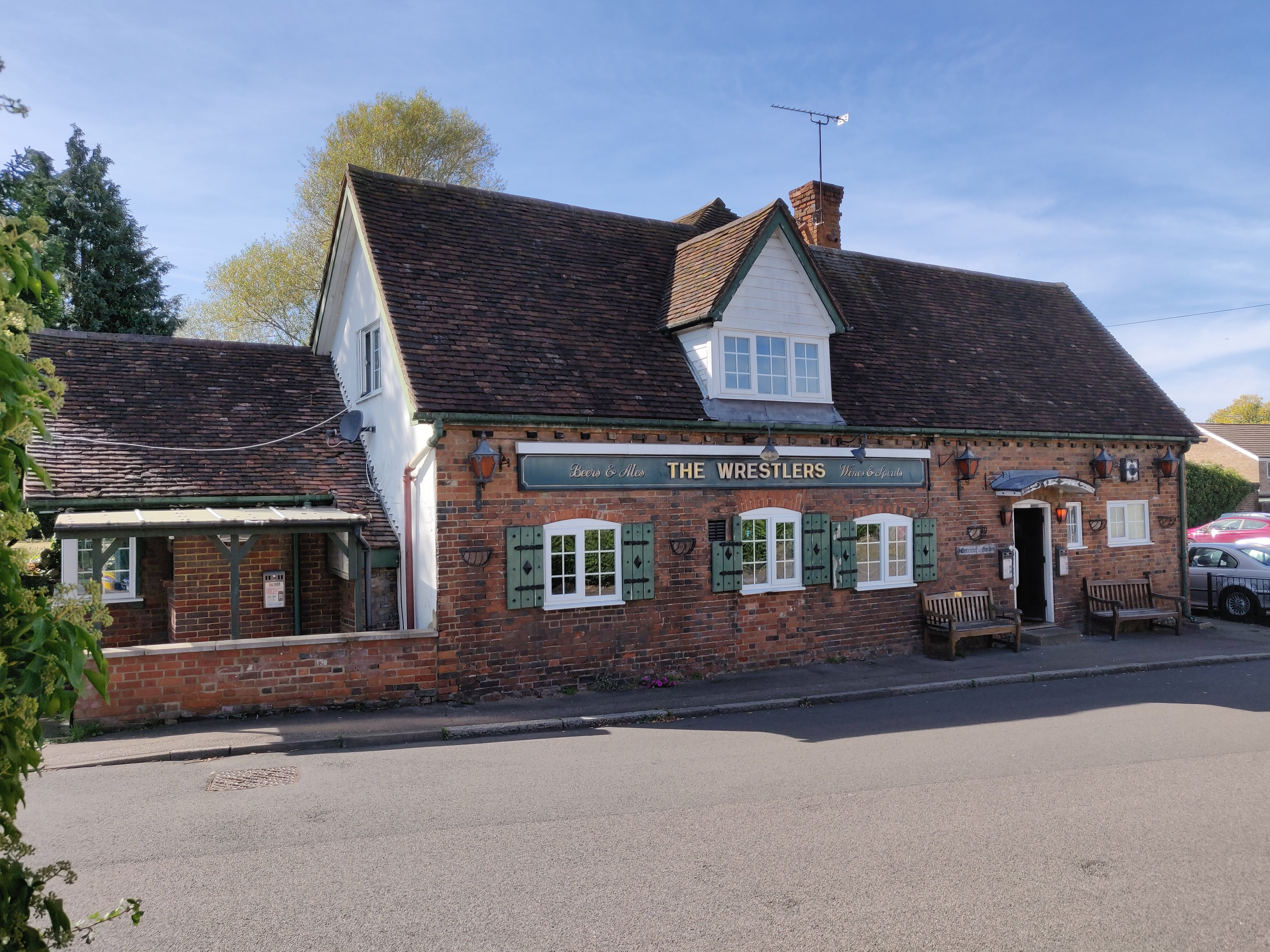

The Wrestlers is a public house on the Great North Road in Hatfield, Hertfordshire, England. The Grade II listed building has an eighteenth-century chequered red brick front, but it is based on a sixteenth-century core which preserves some of its timber framing.
