= Sky Active =

Interactive features on the Sky Digital TV platform

Sky Active is the old brand name for interactive features on Sky Digital and has been available in the UK and Ireland. It has enabled a viewer to interact with TV content, respond to an advertisement or access internet-based services.

== History and technology ==
The service replaced Open...., which helped launch Sky Digital's interactive content and was based on Broadcast Services using OpenTV modules. Sky Active instead also made use of Interactive Online Services authored by 3rd parties in WTVML and displayed on the TV using a microbrowser provided by WapTV Ltd. The WTVML Microbrowser and Internet Gateway were 95% acquired by Sky from WapTV in June 2000. The WapTV technology was first used to launch interactive online betting on 6 December 2000, and went on to enable many more Interactive Online Services. With the dual technologies available to them, Sky Active launched many other features and services which viewers enjoyed such as games, email and shopping via their TV.

In 2001, existing Open... keyboard peripherals could be used with the Sky Active service, as well as the Sky Navigator (combining the functions of a keyboard with a Sky+ remote; the typical remote keypad would flip open on a panel to reveal the full keyboard) and the Sky Gamepad (a simple controller device intended for the system's games, most notably Beehive Bedlam). Unlike Open..., Sky Active focused more on Sky-related products and services, including Sky Vegas and At the Races, as well as full interactive services for Sky Movies, Sky Sports and Sky News. Chat sessions were held around major programming. Email could still be done with talk21 as with Open..., but Yahoo! and Demon email accounts were now supported as well using WTVML. Integration with mobile phones was also introduced, allowing users to download ringtones, send SMS messages from their Digiboxes, and receive alerts from Sky News and Sky Sports on their phone.

It could be accessed by pressing the red button on a Sky Digital remote, while watching any Sky Digital channel. Alternatively, there was an entry in the "Interactive" area of the EPG. Sky Active, like the rest of the Sky Digital platform, was powered by the OpenTV interactive software. Also like Open..., the service relied on a telephone connection to work and charges would be levied (as premium rate) based on the calls placed by the Digibox modem, though the channel-specific services (like Sky Sports Active) were usually free. A telephone icon would appear on the screen and the necessary fees would be stated before the viewers went forward with their selection.

In 2001 Sky acquired the remaining 5% of WapTV partly due to the popularity of "red button" picture-in-picture interactive services which could easily be used to enhance live TV channels with online content. These services represented the very earliest examples of the convergence of broadband and broadcast content in the Digital TV industry.

In 2004, a major redesign saw the previous, text-heavy, top page replaced by a visually-based front page, with a video magazine playing full-screen (surrounded by promotions, options and a scrolling ticker); the yellow button would take the user to a 16-screen video mosaic showcasing multiple options. The green button would take users to an alphabetical index of the entire service. This came about after feedback from viewers and a need to prioritise around different audiences, particularly in the daytime and late evening (the service's peak usage hours).

=== Closure ===
Over time, as more and more people got access to the internet, outside products and services left Sky Active. The service, along with Sky Games, was shut down on 31 January 2015. As of 2020, Beehive Bedlam, the service's signature game, has returned in the form of an app available to users of the Sky Q platform.
