= PCF =

PCF may refer to:

== Computing ==
- PC Format, a monthly magazine
- Percentage-closer filtering, a shadow mapping technique in computer graphics
- Pivotal Cloud Foundry, a version of the open source Cloud Foundry PaaS software supported by Pivotal Software
- Point coordination function, a media access control technique used in wireless LANs
- Pair correlation function, a statistical tool to measure spatial correlation
- Polymer-clad fiber, a type of optical fiber
- Programming Computable Functions, a functional programming language

== File formats ==
- Physical Constraints File, a file format for the specification of FPGA
- Portable Compiled Format, a file format for distributing bitmap fonts
- Portable Content Format, a file format for DVB-based interactive television
- Profile Configuration File, a configuration file used to set up VPN connections
- Page configuration Format (Guidewire)

== Technology ==
- Photonic-crystal fiber
- Pounds per cubic foot, a non-SI unit for density
- Product carbon footprint method

== Other ==
- Pan-Canadian Framework on Clean Growth and Climate Change
- PAP Community Foundation, Singapore charity
- Parti Communiste Français, the French Communist party
- Participatory Culture Foundation, U.S. charity to encourage individual political participation
- A US Navy hull classification symbol: Patrol craft fast (PCF) (Swift boats)
- PathCheck Foundation, a COVID-19 exposure notification app
- P.C.F, a 2022 album by Psychic Fever from Exile Tribe
- PCF theory, in mathematics
- Percentage Closer Filtering, a smoothing technique used in shadow mapping
- President's Choice Financial, Canadian financial service company
- Prevent Cancer Foundation, U.S. charity
- Princeton Christian Fellowship, campus ministry
- Prostate Cancer Foundation, U.S. charity
- People Can Fly, a video game developer
- Port Canaveral, Florida, United States
