= TsUM Kyiv =

- ЦУМ Київ
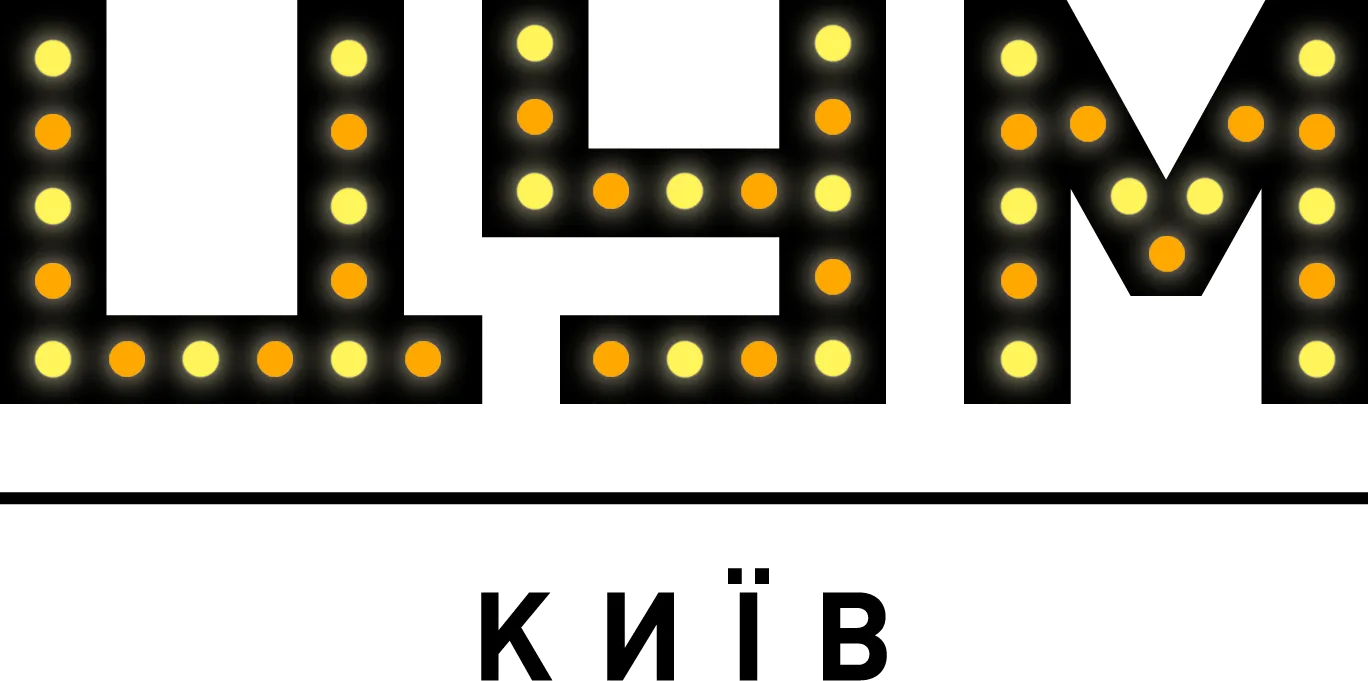

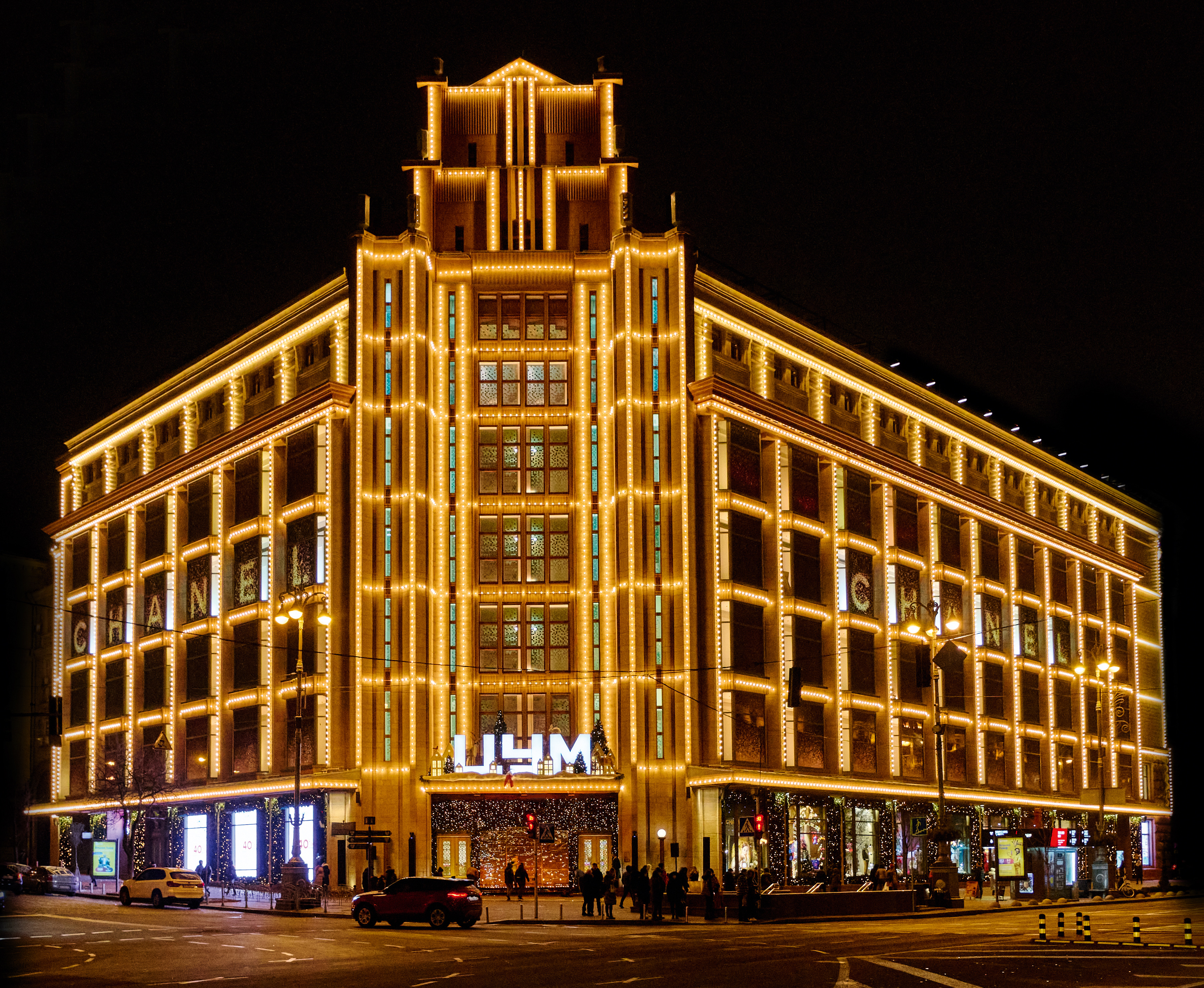
- Interactive map of the TsUM Kyiv area

General information
- Status: Open
- Architectural style: Art Deco
- Location: 2, Bohdana Khmelnytskoho St. 38 Khreshchatyk St., Kyiv, Ukraine
- Coordinates: 50°26′43″N 30°31′14″E
- Opened: 1939
- Renovated: 1955–1958; 2012-2016
- Owner: ESTA Holding

Design and construction
- Architect: Daniil Fridman

Website
- tsum.ua

Immovable Monument of Local Significance of Ukraine
- Official name: Центральний універмаг (Central Universal Department Store)
- Type: Architecture
- Reference no.: 3546-Кв

Central Universal Department Store Kyiv (Ukrainian: Центральний універсальний магазин Київ, romanized: Tsentralnyi universalnyi mahazyn Kyiv [tsenˈtrɑlʲnɪj ʊni⁽ʲ⁾werˈsɑlʲnɪj mɐɦɐˈzɪn ˈkɪjiu̯]) or TsUM Kyiv (Ukrainian: ЦУМ Київ) is Ukraine's one and only department store of the classical format. It is located at the intersection of Bohdan Khmelnytsky and Khreshchatyk streets in the heart of Kyiv. The department store's building in the Art Deco style was erected from 1936 to 1939. From 2012 to 2016, the building was reconstructed while preserving the historical facade from 1939. Today, the department store has eight floors featuring clothing, household goods, a food court, and a cinema.

== Overview ==
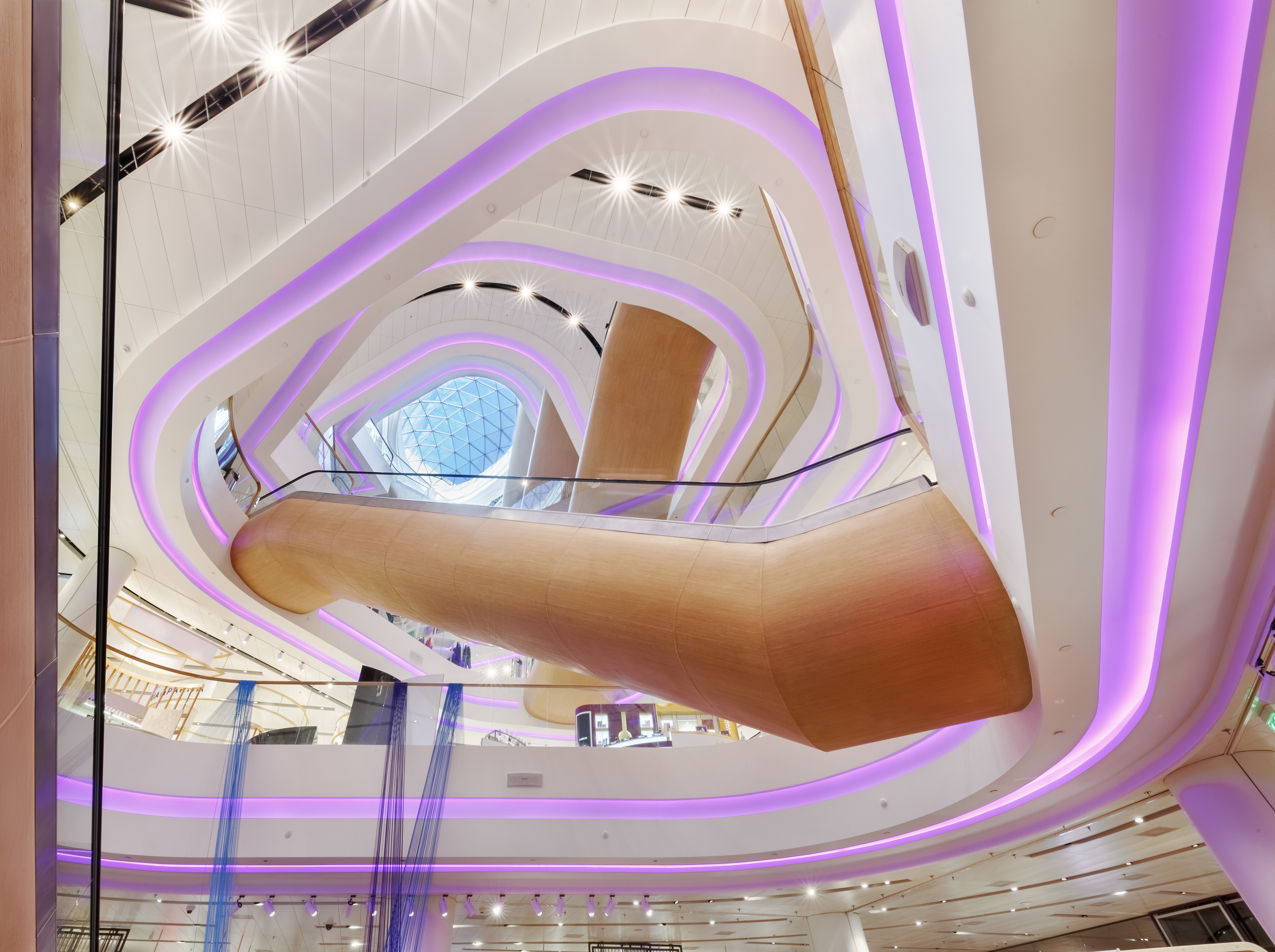
TsUM interior

Today, the department store is a leading retailer in fashion, beauty products, lingerie, sport, kidswear & toys, home & gifts, food & beverages, and entertainment. TsUM Kyiv has eight floors that feature women's and men's clothing, footwear, accessories, perfumes, make-up, sports, children's and household goods, a food court with restaurants and cafes, and a premium cinema Multiplex. On the seventh floor of the department store located Milk Bar restaurant that has a terrace with a panoramic view of Khreshchatyk street. In the summer, the department store hosts concerts of classical and jazz music.

TsUM Kyiv imports over 200 world-famous brands and leases 1000 spots to other brands. Among them are Jimmy Choo, Dolce&Gabbana, Versace, Marni, Patou, Coperni, Stella McCartney, Proenza Schouler, Wandler, Victoria Beckham, Giuseppe Zanotti, Isabel Marant, Aquazzura, Eleventy, Paul Smith, JW Anderson, A Bathing Ape, Cortigiani, Herno, Lardini, Raffa and many others.

TsUM Kyiv is one of the main business-partner of the local Ukrainian designers. On the third floor of the department store, one can find over 125 Ukrainian brands including Frolov, Sleeper, Ksenia Schnaider, Litkovskaya, Ruslan Baginskiy, Anna October, Bevza, Poustovit and others.

In late 2020, TsUM Kyiv has opened a Home&Gifts Department on its fifth floor where one can find the books from Assouline and Taschen, high-end audio products from UB+ and Transparent Sound, gifts from SELETTI and Black+Blum, board games from Hector Saxe Paris, and sculptures from Bearbrick.

In April 2019, TsUM Kyiv has launched its online store tsum.ua which delivers products across Ukraine and develops as a marketplace. The marketplace features over 300 brands. There is a Click&Collect area on the second floor of the department store for online customers.

== History ==
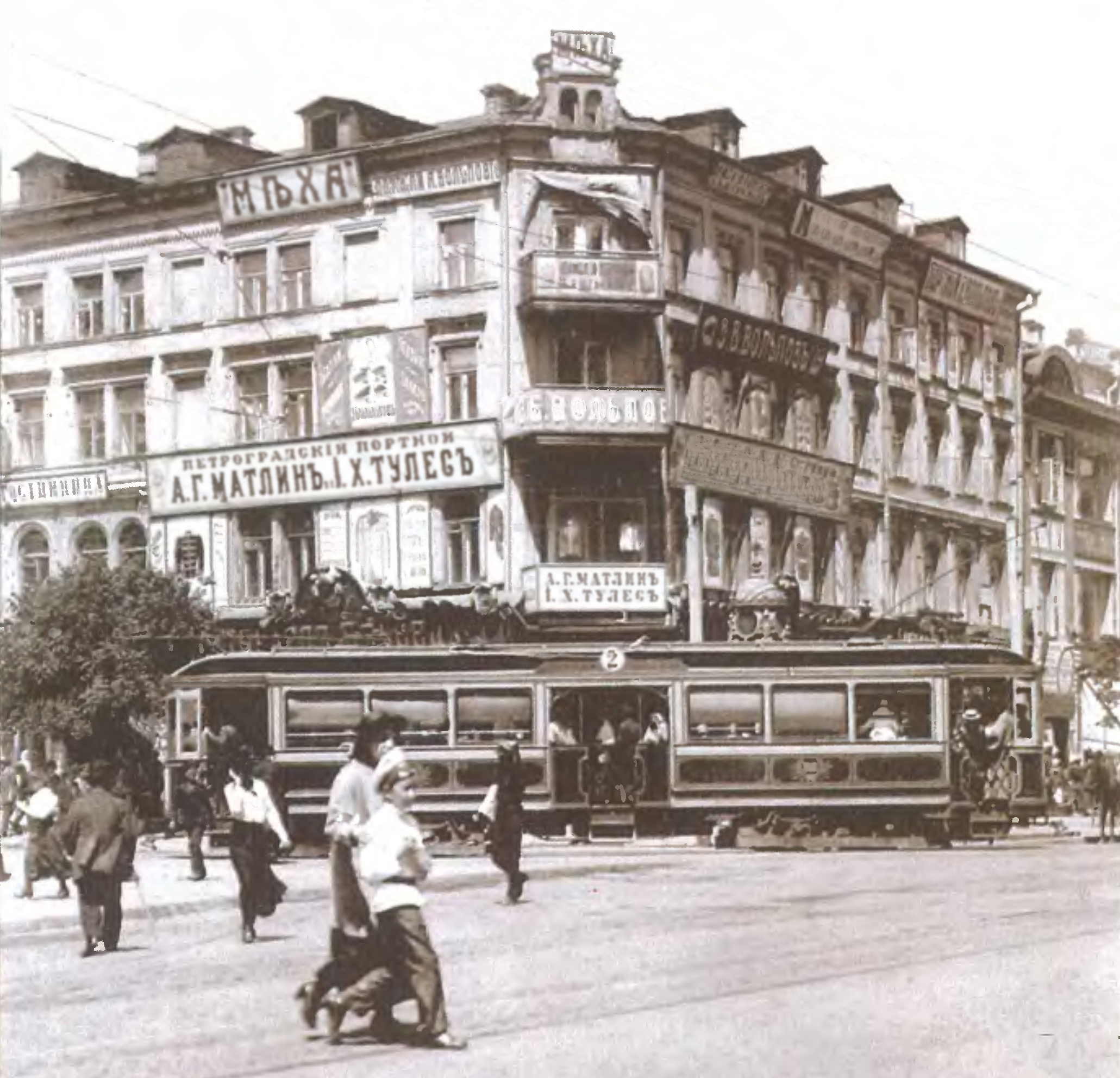
A building prior to TsUM in 1916

Kyiv's main department store opened its doors to visitors on May 1, 1939. The building was designed in Art Deco style. The department store had seven floors, high ceilings, marble stairs, and an elevator. TsUM Kyiv had operated until the beginning of the 1941 occupation during World War II.

From 1955 to 1958, the department store added a new wing on the side of Khreshchatyk Street. The project was implemented by architects Gomolyak and Zhoga. The expanded retail space of 9,000 m^{2} (97,000 sq ft) was able to serve 170,000 customers per day.

In 1960, TsUM Kyiv was among the first building in Ukraine to install escalators. Previously, escalators had only been operating inside of metro stations.

In the 1960s and 1970s, the shopping windows of the department store were designed by the team led by Yevhen Sheremetyev. TsUM Kyiv was a popular meeting place for Kyiv's intelligentsia (artists, sculptors, architects, and directors), among whom was prominent filmmaker Serhiy Paradzhanov.

=== Reconstruction ===
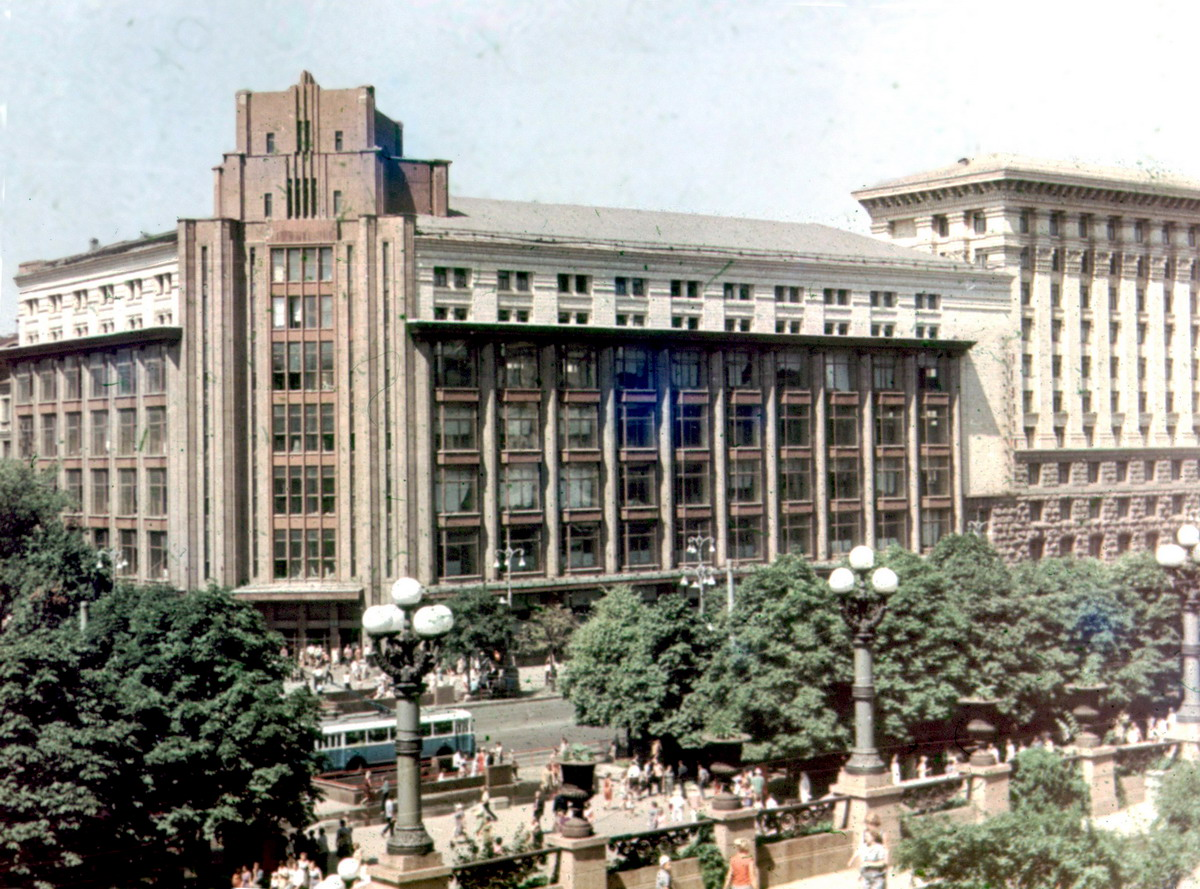
TsUM in 1974

Ukrainian company ESTA Holding acquired the department store in 2010. The company said that it is ready to invest over 100 million dollars in the reconstruction. The project of the reconstruction was approved by the Kyiv City Planning Council. The company has also opened a round-the-clock hotline where the citizens could submit their proposals and receive any information about the progress of the reconstruction. The company has also opened a website devoted to reconstruction with regular updates.

TsUM Kyiv has been closed for reconstruction on February 1, 2012. Over 170 companies took part in the renovation. The brand of TsUM Kyiv was developed by the German company Landor, and the British company Benoy was responsible for the architectural solutions. Philippe De Beauvoir, director of the oldest department store in Paris, Le Bon Marché, was invited as a project advisor.

The reconstruction began with the creation of a two-level parking lot, which deepened the building for another 12.8 metres (42 ft). The total area of the department store has almost doubled after the reconstruction to 45,000 m^{2} (480,000 sq ft), while the retail space expanded up to 23,500 m^{2} (253,000 sq ft).

The workers have installed 500 tons of metal structures to preserve the facade of the building during the dismantling and reconstruction of the department store's interior. Every day, 188 people worked at the construction site of the department store at the same time to finish the project on time. The renovated TsUM Kyiv was opened to visitors in December 2016.

== Eco-Awareness ==
TsUM Kyiv sorts the waste since 2016.

Since 2018, the department store has been working on reducing energy consumption.

In 2020 TsUM Kyiv launched eco-friendly delivery of the products ordered through tsum.ua using the electro car BMWi3. The project made it to the list of the finalists of the UN Global Compact in Ukraine – Partnership for Sustainability Award 2020. The same year the department store also opened a free charging station for electric cars. TsUM Kyiv has increased the number of partnerships with eco-aware brands. Since 2020, the office of TsUM Kyiv uses only locally produced recycled paper.

TsUM Kyiv has also made a significant step towards sustainable development by joining the UN Global Compact in Ukraine in July 2020.

== Projects ==
In 2019, TsUM Kyiv has marked its 80th anniversary. The advertisement campaign TsUM Kyiv Through Generations featured representatives of famous Ukrainian dynasties, artists, and entrepreneurs who made a personal contribution to Ukraine's prosperity. 15 heroes took part in the campaign including the National Artist of Ukrainian Ada Rogovtseva. TsUM Kyiv has also made a series of entertainment and educational events: presentation of the perfume line Carine Roitfeld Perfumes; meet-and-greet with Sandra Sandor, designer of the brand Nanushka; discussion panel with fashion experts and special guest Carine Roitfeld. The department store has also presented the documentary film "TsUM 80" about the history of TsUM Kyiv. The team created a special print edition “80 years of TsUM Kyiv” where artists, historians, designers, and the staff of the department store shared their secrets and explained how TsUM Kyiv became what we know it today.

To mark St. Valentine's Day in 2020, the department store replaced the sign “TsUM” on the facade of the building with “TS’OM” – the sound of the kiss in Ukrainian. The case was shortlisted for three categories of the Effie Awards Ukraine 2020: seasonal marketing, media innovation/idea, and short-term campaign.

Every season, the creative team of TsUM Kyiv decorates the department store's shopping windows. In 2021, the spring/summer 2020 window design project Force of Nature received the honorable mention from VMSD at the 27th Annual International Retail Design Competition International Visual Competition.

The 2019 Christmas-themed design of the shopping windows Gift Factory received two awards: the prize for the best Christmas decor in Ukraine 2019-2020 from Malls Club and MK Illumination; and a Grand Prix (Best in Show) at the VMSD's 2020 International Visual Competition. The design also became the main theme of the VMSD summer issue. The 2019 spring design Rebirth dedicated to the 80th anniversary of the department store has received an honorable mention in the same competition. Winter 2018 design Kaleidoscope ended up on the short-list of the international competition of windows designs - VM & DISPLAY AWARDS.

In the fall of 2019, TsUM Kyiv designed the shopping windows in collaboration with 8 Ukrainian artists: Yulia Belyaeva, Masha Reva, Jolie Poly, Oksana Levchenya, Vova Vorotnyov, art group Pomme de Boue and art duo of the twin brothers BRATY ART. The same year, the department store created shopping bags in collaboration with British illustrator Spyros Halaris. Apart from that, in 2020, TsUM Kyiv invited one of the most famous Ukrainian illustrators, Serhiy Maidukov, to work on its shopping windows. The artist also created drawings for the store's bags. In 2021, Kyiv’s central department store opened autumn season with the launch of fabulous window displays that feature incredible art pieces by muralist Volodymyr Manzhos, also known under the pseudonym WaOne Interesni Kazki. His monumental paintings can be found in Ukraine and far beyond its borders – the US, India, France, Denmark, Spain, Morocco, and more. Moreover, TsUM Kyiv has also hosted public talks with artists where the visitors could find out the story behind the window displays and AR technology used for TsUM Kyiv bags, which is a modern way of supporting art.

In the spring of 2023, TsUM Kyiv partnered with Sestry Feldman to create store displays as part of an in-store campaign focused on the concept of rebirth. The displays were used to create a positive atmosphere for the citizens of Kyiv during the ongoing Russo-Ukrainian war. The displays created by Sestry Feldman won first place for "Non-Holiday Window Displays" in the International Visual Competition held by VMSD, Visual Merchandising + Store Design, magazine. Sestry Feldman are two of Kyiv's most recognized street artists.

== Management of TsUM Kyiv ==
- 1943–1944 — Petro Chapko
- 1945 — Nile Monte
- 1946–1950 —Valentyna Doronina
- 1951–1959 — Fedir Zubachish
- 1959–1984 — Mykola Nalyvaiko
- 1984–2004 — Zinaida Lebid
- 2004–2009 — Svitlana Lytvynenko
- 2009–2016 — Olena Semenova, Iryna Ostapchuk, Mykola Krasnobaev
- 2016–2018 — Brian Poll Handly
- 2018–present — Yevhen Mamay
