= Hicks Hall =

Courthouse in Clerkenwell, London, England

Coordinates: 51°31′15″N 0°6′6″W

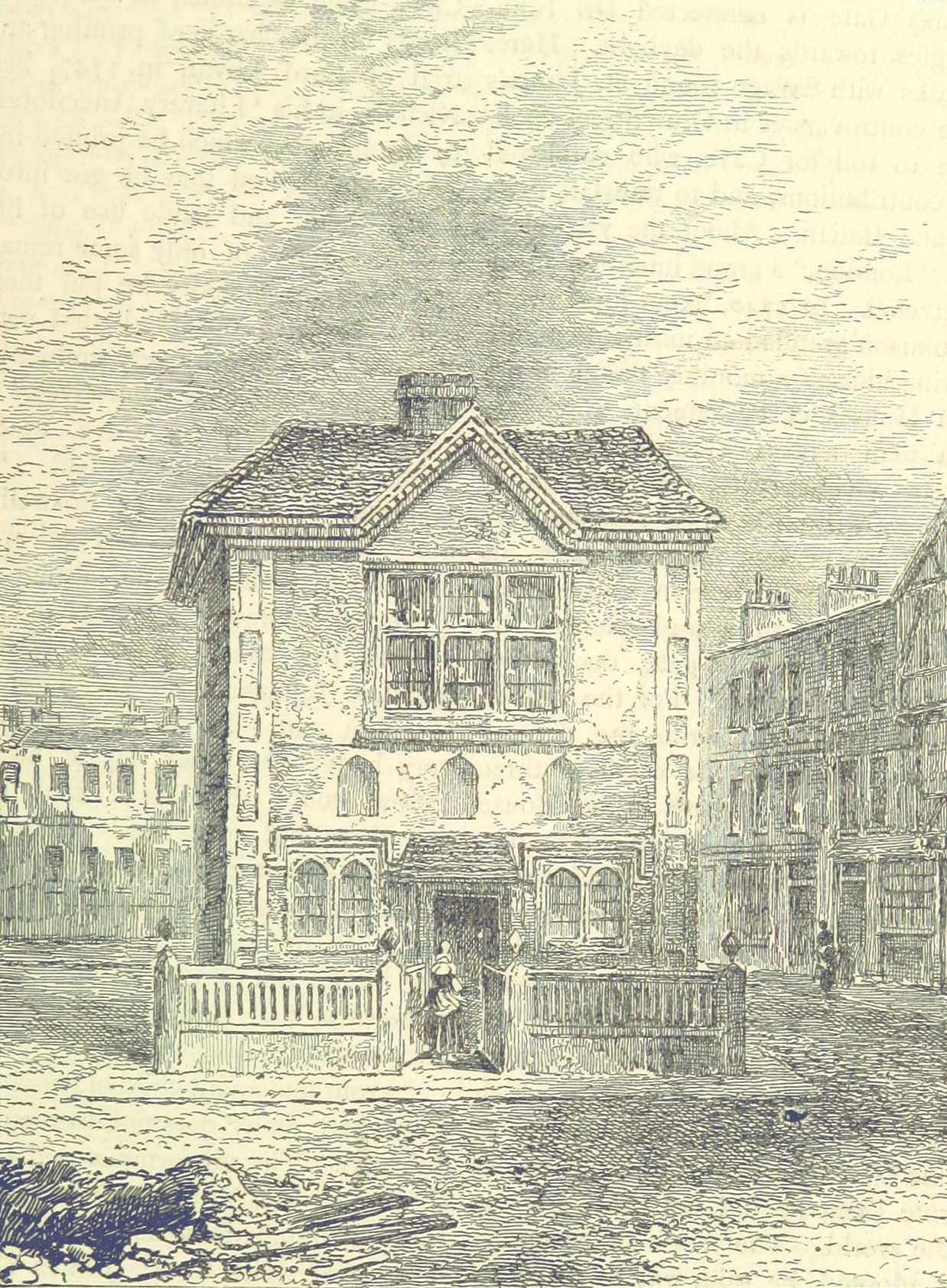
South front of Hicks Hall in about 1750: a wood engraving published in 1873, some 90 years after the building's demolition

Hicks Hall, or Hickes' Hall, was a courthouse at the southern end of St John Street, Clerkenwell, London. It opened in 1612, and was closed and demolished in 1782. It was the first purpose-built sessions house for justices of the peace of the county of Middlesex (including the City of Westminster), and became the main court of petty sessions and arraignment for more serious offences, including cases involving plots, attacks and minor transgressions against the state.

The hall stood at the start of the Great North Road, running from London to York and Edinburgh, and was routinely used as the datum point for measuring mileages along that route.

== Prehistory and location ==
From at least the 1540s, the Middlesex justices regularly held their sessions in an inn at the southern end of St John Street. This was one of the closest points in the county of Middlesex to the City of London, lying immediately north of Smithfield Bar, a tollgate on the City boundary. Two inns were used at different times: the Castle, on the west side of the street, and the Windmill, slightly further north on the east side.

In the 1570s, Elizabeth I granted a lease of waste land in the street to the surveyor Christopher Saxton for building a new sessions house, but nothing more is heard of this project.

== Hicks Hall ==
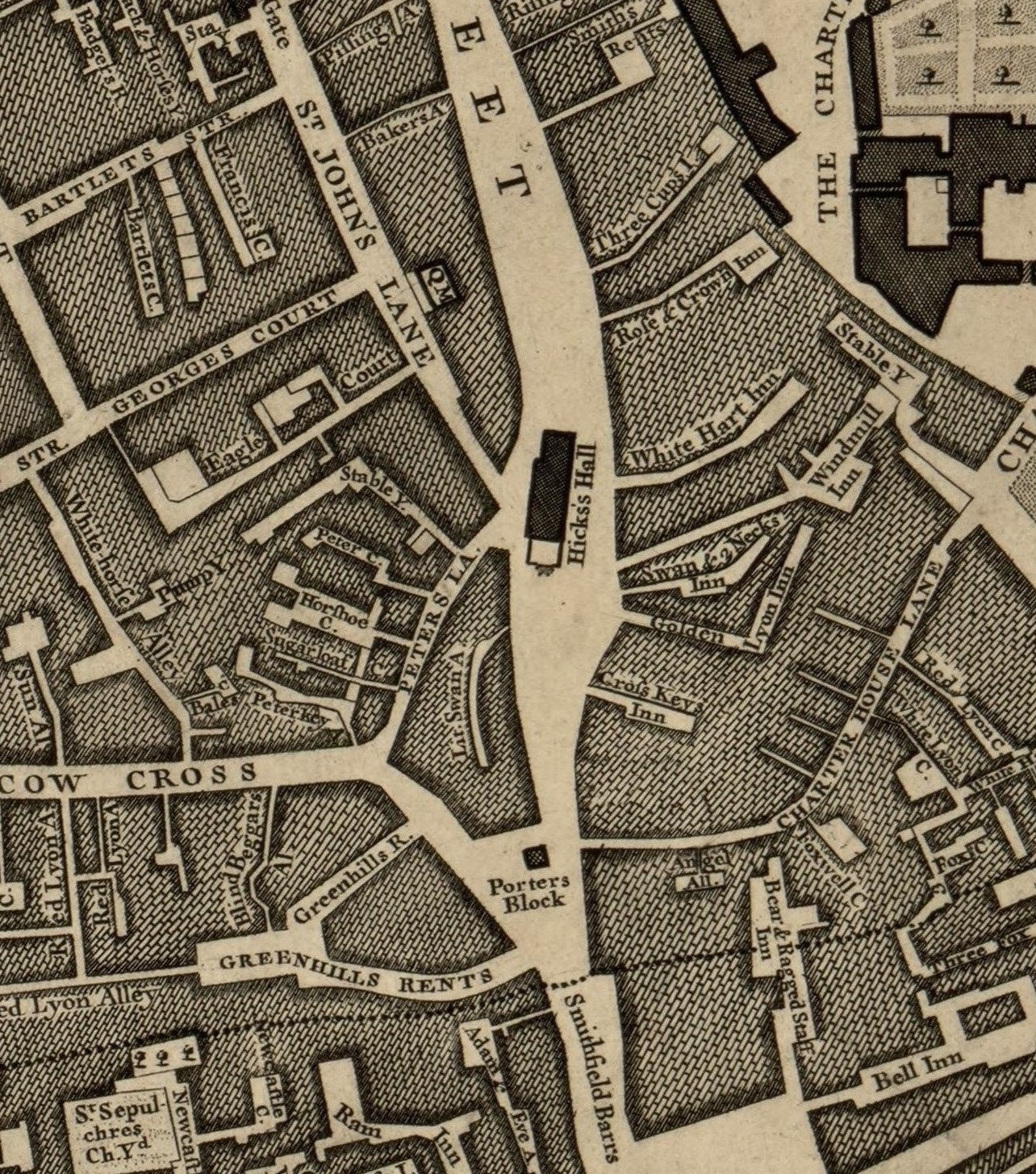
Hicks Hall marked on John Rocque's Map of London, 1746

In 1609, James I was petitioned by the magistrates of Middlesex for a new site for a sessions house. The petition was successful, and this time the building was erected, being completed in 1612.

The location chosen was an island site in the middle of St John Street where it broadened out, opposite the Windmill inn, and close to the junction with St John's Lane. The estimated costs of construction alone were estimated at up to £900 (in general commodities equivalent to £228,000 in 2023). The building was paid for by the wealthy fabric merchant Sir Baptist Hicks (or Hickes), later created 1st Viscount Campden. At the first session held in the new building, in January 1613, it was resolved that it should be named "Hicks-hall" in honour of its patron.

For 170 years, Hicks Hall was used to hear cases in the county of Middlesex, and is mentioned in many contemporary reports. On 9 October 1660, a grand jury was convened here to try 29 of the men who had signed the death warrant of Charles I, proceedings then continuing at the Old Bailey Sessions House. In 1679, Titus Oates gave evidence here in connection with the "Meal-Tub Plot" against James, Duke of York. In 1682, Count Karl Johann von Königsmarck was acquitted at Hicks Hall of complicity in the murder of Thomas Thynne (although he had in fact almost certainly hired the three assassins). In 1683, William, Lord Russell was condemned to death at Hicks Hall, following his trial at the Old Bailey, for his involvement in the Rye House Plot.

The hall receives a passing mention in Samuel Pepys's diary for 6 December 1660:

Before I went forth this morning, one came to give me notice that the Justices of Middlesex do meet tomorrow at Hickes hall and that I, as one, am desired to be there; but I fear I cannot be there, though I much desire it.

In addition to the sessions house, the original intention was to incorporate a small prison in the building, to relieve overcrowding at Newgate. In the event, the site proved too constricted to allow this, but a more modest lock-up was included.

== Closure and successor courthouses ==
By the 1770s the street had become uncomfortably busy and noisy for court business, and the building itself had fallen into disrepair. Although some consideration was given to rebuilding, it was eventually closed and demolished in 1782. Sessions were transferred to the new Middlesex Sessions House on Clerkenwell Green (which, for a time, also became known colloquially as "Hicks Hall"). Middlesex Sessions House closed in turn in 1921, when cases spanning the Inner London area on both sides of the Thames were moved to the Sessions House in Newington.

== Legacy ==
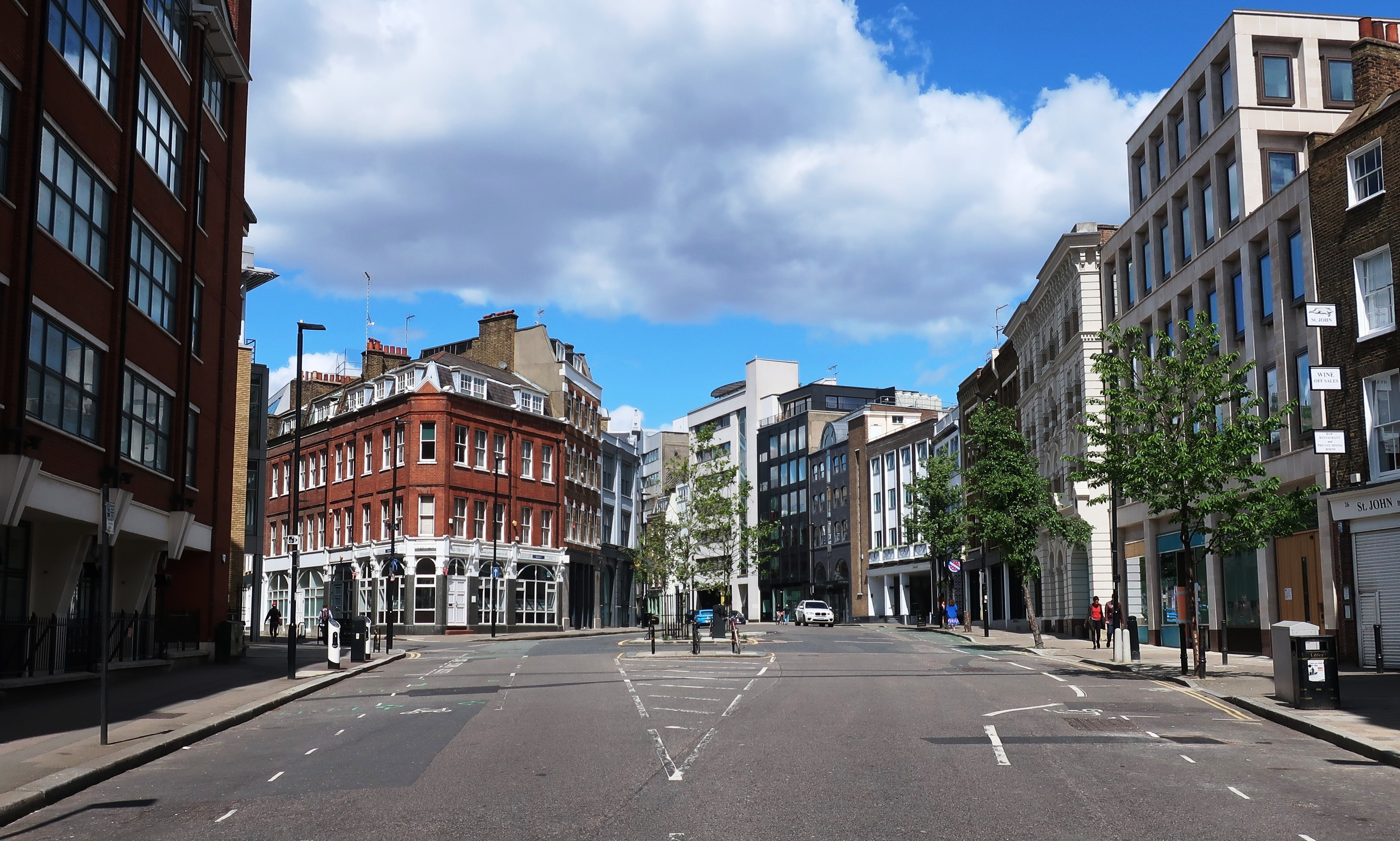
The site of Hicks Hall in St John Street (looking north)

A carved oak chimneypiece, commemorating Hicks' gift, was installed in Hicks Hall in 1618. Following the building's demolition, this was transferred first to the Clerkenwell Green Sessions House, and afterwards to that at Newington, where it survives. It is inscribed:

Sir Baptist Hickes of Kensington in the County of Middlesex Knight one of the justices of the peace of this county of Middlesex of his worthy disposition and at his own proper charge buylt this session house in the year of our Lord God 1612 and gave it to the justices of peace of this county and their successors for a sessions house for ever. 1618.

The site of Hicks Hall remains obvious as a large island in the middle of St John Street, distinguished by the divergence of the building frontages on either side of the street to leave space for two clear thoroughfares. In the late 19th century a set of public toilets were built on the island, described in 1892 as "a modern erection which, if more useful, is less dignified" than the original courthouse.

== Use as datum point ==
Hicks Hall was the notional starting point of the Great North Road, and was used as the datum point for mileages on that road. Measurements were taken from the building's front. The location's use for this purpose survived the demolition of the building itself: it continued until the early 19th century when Charing Cross (the statue of Charles I) began to be treated as the notional centre of London, and the agreed point from which all distances from London were measured. Until the late 19th century, milestones could still be seen on the Great North Road stating the number of miles "from Hicks Hall", or "from where Hicks Hall formerly stood".

== Cultural references ==
- In Samuel Butler's poem Hudibras (published 1663–1678), the following lines appear:

An Old Dull Sot, wh'had told the Clock,
For many years at Bridewel-Dock,
At Westminster, and Hickses-Hall,
And Hiccius-Doctius play'd in all ...

— Hudibras, part III, canto 3

== Sources ==
- Temple, Philip, ed. (2008). "Hicks' Hall (demolished)". Survey of London: South and East Clerkenwell. Survey of London. Vol. 46. London: Yale University Press. pp. 206–209. ISBN 9780300137279.
- Timbs, John (1865). "From Hicks's Hall to Campden House". Walks and Talks about London. London: Lockwood & Co. pp. 54–63.
