= CHU Saint-Pierre =

Hospital in Brussels, Belgium

CHU Saint-Pierre (in French) UMC Sint-Pieter (in Dutch)
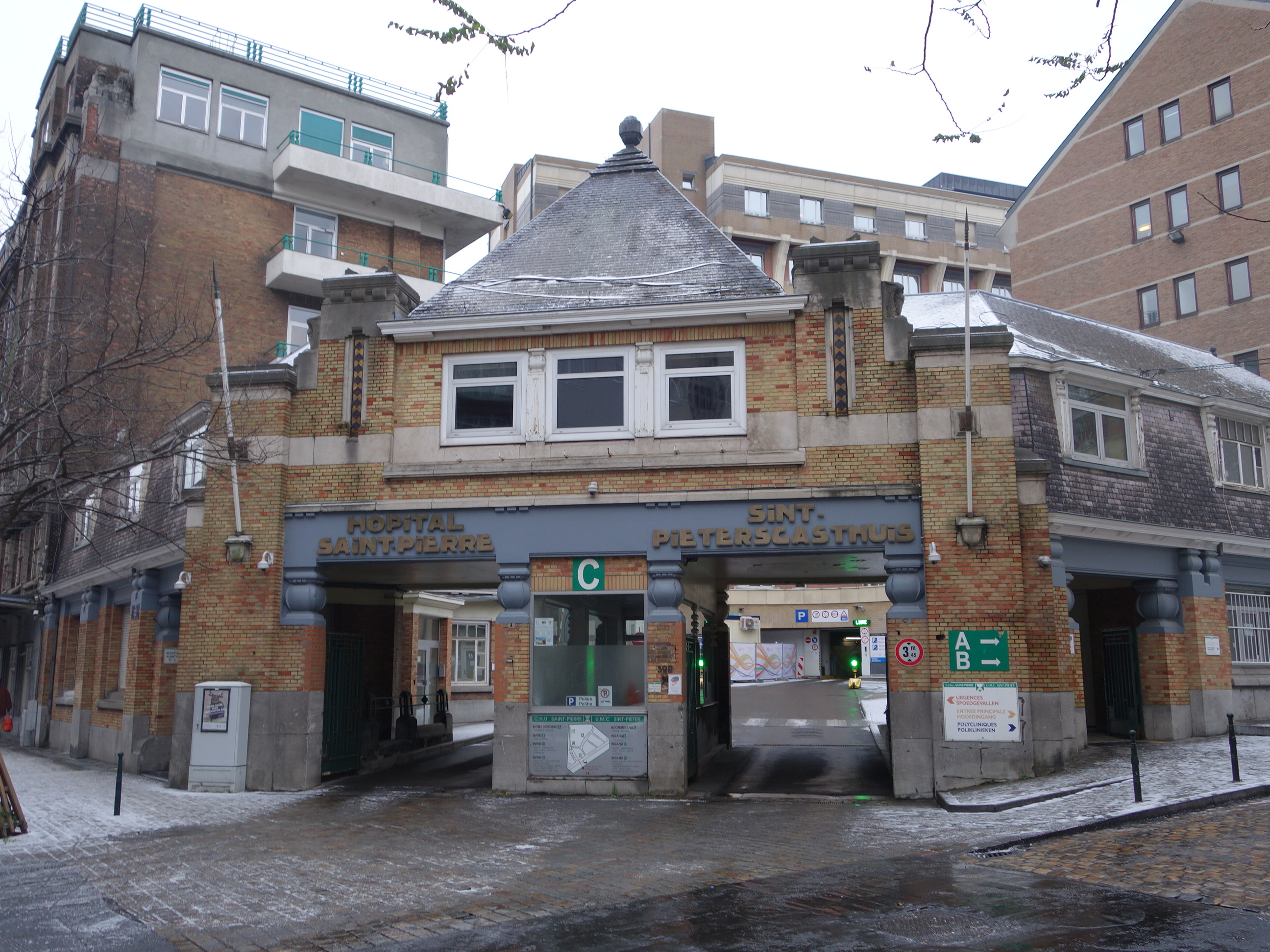
- Entrance pavilion of the CHU Saint-Pierre

Geography
- Location: Rue Haute / Hoogstraat 322, 1000 City of Brussels, Brussels-Capital Region, Belgium
- Coordinates: 50°50′01″N 4°20′45″E

Organisation
- Care system: Public
- Type: General
- Patron: Saint Peter

Services
- Emergency department: Yes

Links
- Website: www.stpierre-bru.be/en
- Lists: Hospitals in Belgium

The CHU Saint-Pierre (French: Centre hospitalier universitaire Saint-Pierre) or UMC Sint-Pieter (Dutch: Universitair Medisch Centrum Sint-Pieter)—commonly known as the Hôpital Saint-Pierre in French or Sint-Pietersziekenhuis in Dutch, meaning "St. Peter's Hospital"—is a public teaching hospital in Brussels, Belgium. It is a research hospital associated with the Université libre de Bruxelles (ULB) and the Vrije Universiteit Brussel (VUB). It is also part of the Réseau hospitalier IRIS, the network of Brussels' public hospitals.

The hospital comprises two sites: Halle Gate and Alexiens/César de Paepe. The main one is located at 322, rue Haute/Hoogstraat in the Marolles/Marollen district.

== History ==
The site of the CHU Saint-Pierre was originally home to a leprosarium, known as Sint-Pieters-ter-Zieken ("St. Peter of the Sick"), founded around 1150 outside the first city walls. This establishment was initially run by a community of lay brothers and sisters. From 1258 onwards, Augustinian nuns took charge of the place. The complex of buildings consisted of a chapel dedicated to Saint Peter surrounded by a few small houses for the lepers and a cemetery. Placed under the protection of Duke John I of Brabant in 1270, it experienced steady expansion and reconstruction in the 13th century. In the following century, it was incorporated within the second city walls and gradually declined due to a regression in healthcare.

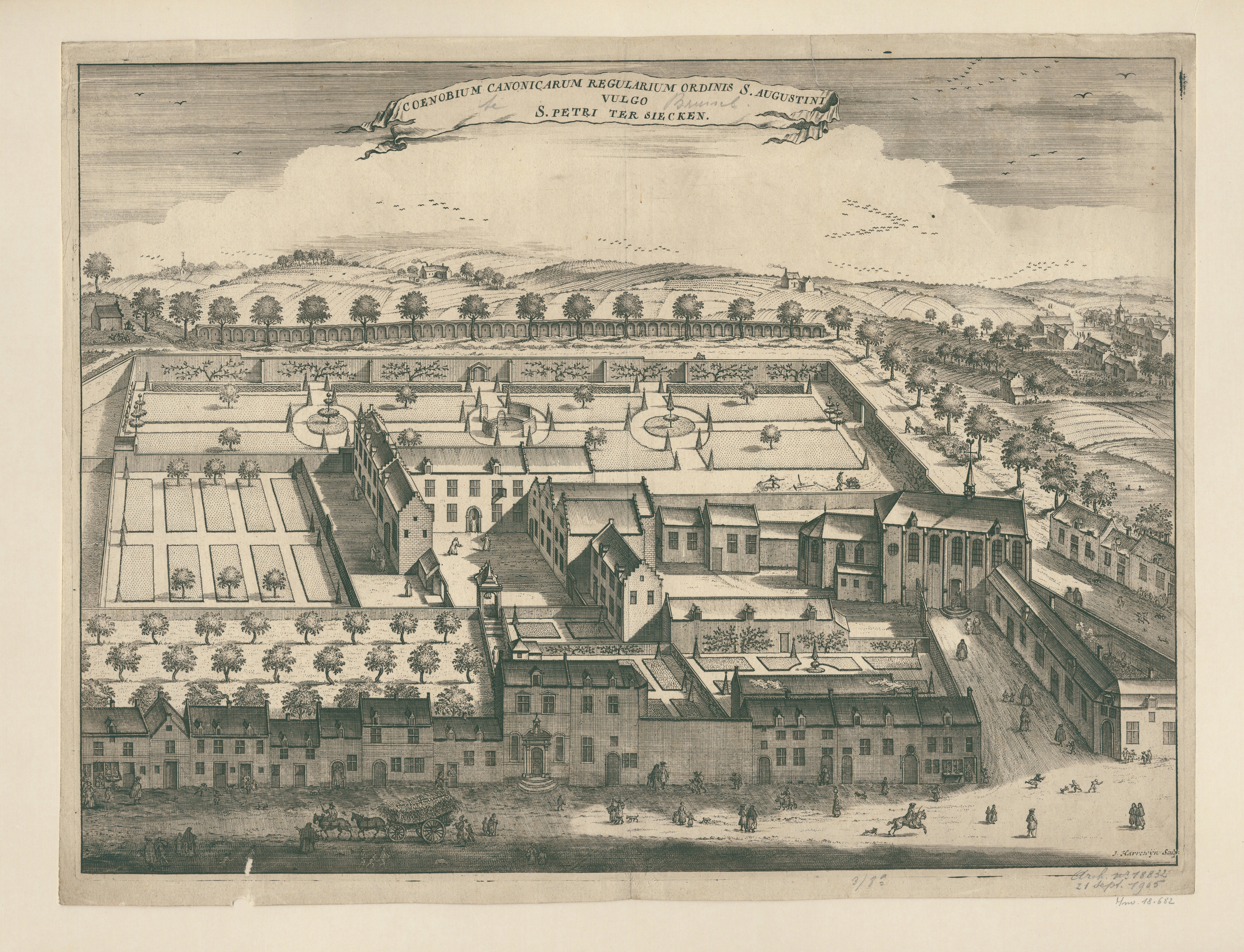
St. Peter's leprosarium, engraving by Jacobus Harrewijn, published in Chorographia sacra Brabantiae (1727)

With the decrease of leprosy, so did St. Peter's importance. In 1611, it was converted into a convent for contemplative Augustinian nuns. It was only in 1783 that it was officially designated as a hospital by order of Emperor Joseph II, serving as a branch of the Saint-Jean-op-de-Poel Hospital. St. Peter's Hospital became a teaching hospital in 1788, following the transfer of the Faculty of Medicine, previously located in Leuven, and remained so until 1991. Under French rule, it was elevated to Grand Hospice civil and placed under the supervision of the Administration des Hospices. From that period onwards, it underwent significant growth, becoming one of the three leading healthcare institutions in Brussels, along with the Infirmary Hospice and St. John's Hospital.

When the Belgian Revolution of 1830 broke out, St. Peter's Hospital played a major role in treating the wounded during the Four Days of Brussels, from 23 to 27 September 1830. It accommodated 54 of them, 12 of whom died there, as well as five corpses that were brought there from the skirmishes on the nearby Boulevard de Waterloo/Waterloolaan. Dr Louis-Joseph Seutin, a surgeon at the hospital, distinguished himself by organising the facility to meet the considerable demand for aid and by personally striving to treat both the soldiers of the armed forces of the United Kingdom of the Netherlands—who were attacking the city—as well as the Belgian combatants and Brussels' civilians.

By the mid-19th century, the lack of space began to be felt. A new neoclassical-style hospital was built between 1848 and 1859, according to the plans of the architect Alexis Partoes, with subsequent expansions. A new, much larger hospital, financed by the Public Assistance Commission and the Rockefeller Foundation, was decided upon in 1921. The buildings, designed by the architect Jean-Baptiste Dewin, and constructed from 1926 to 1935, also included a school for doctors and nurses.

By the end of the 20th century, St. Peter no longer met contemporary standards. In 1987, the decision was taken to replace the general hospital with a project designed by the Verhaegen architectural firm. The work took place from 1995 to 2005. The buildings facing the Rue Haute/Hoogstraat are the only ones that were retained. The current hospital consists of a tall, concave building from which five wings and annexes radiate.

== Art ==
=== Grow in Freedom mural ===
In a 2023 collaboration between the Ukrainian street artists Sestry Feldman and the Belgian illustrator Teresa Zdralevich, a mural entitled Grow in Freedom was created at the CHU Saint-Pierre Hospital. The mural, which was dedicated to the anniversary of the Russian invasion of Ukraine, was painted on the wall of the hospital, which has provided financial aid to Ukrainian hospitals during the Russo-Ukrainian war.

== See also ==
- List of hospitals in Belgium
- Healthcare in Belgium
