= Middlesex Sessions House =

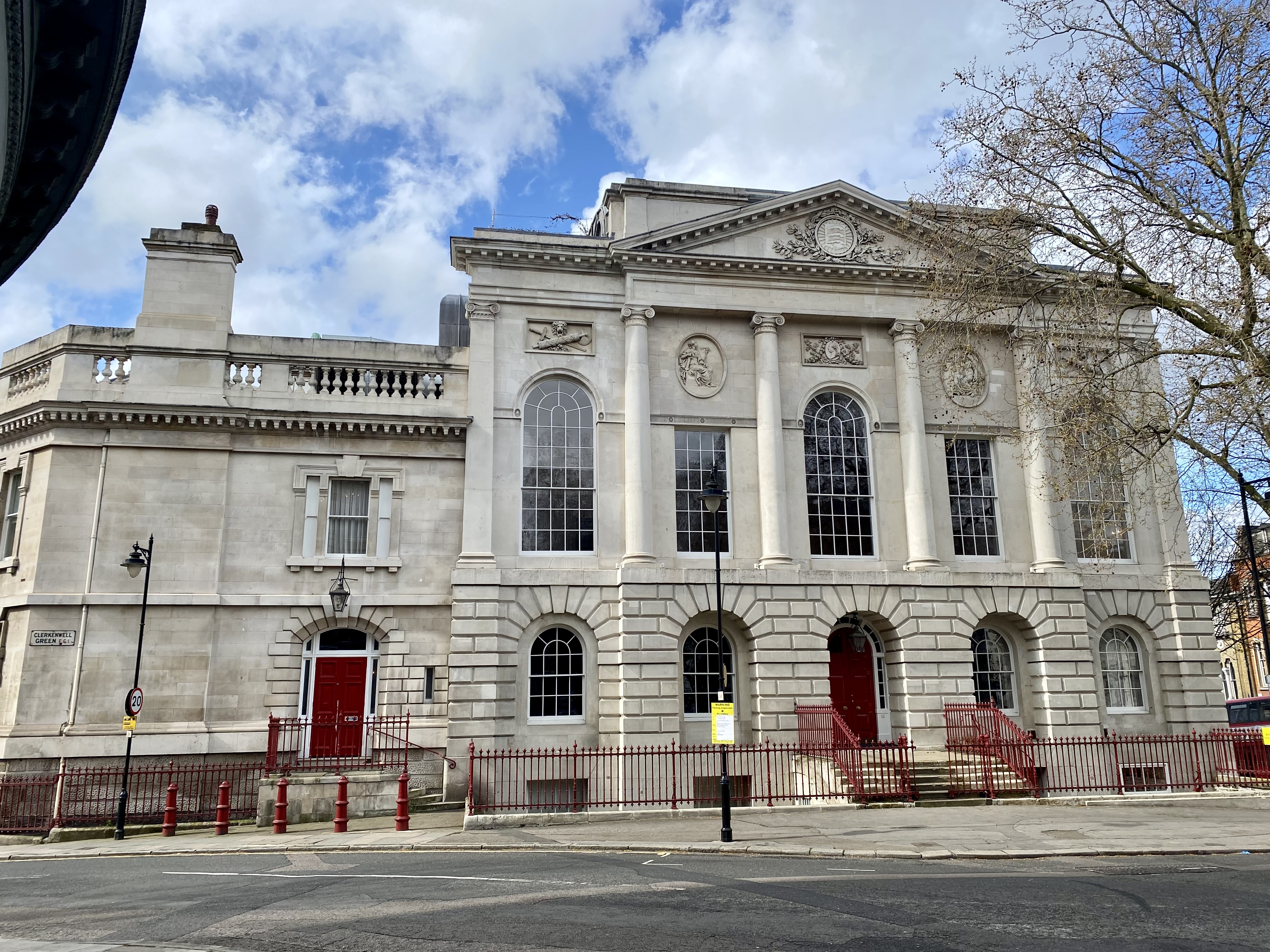
- Middlesex Sessions House

- Location within London Borough of Islington
- 51.5226°N 0.1060°W
- Location: London

History
- Built: 1782

Site notes
- Architect: Thomas Rogers
- Architectural style: Classical style

Listed Building – Grade II*
- Official name: Clerkenwell Conference Centre
- Designated: 29 December 1950
- Reference no.: 1298072

The former Middlesex Sessions House or the Old Sessions House is a large building on Clerkenwell Green in the London Borough of Islington in London, England, built in 1780 as the courthouse for the Middlesex Quarter Sessions. It is a Grade II* listed building.

== History ==
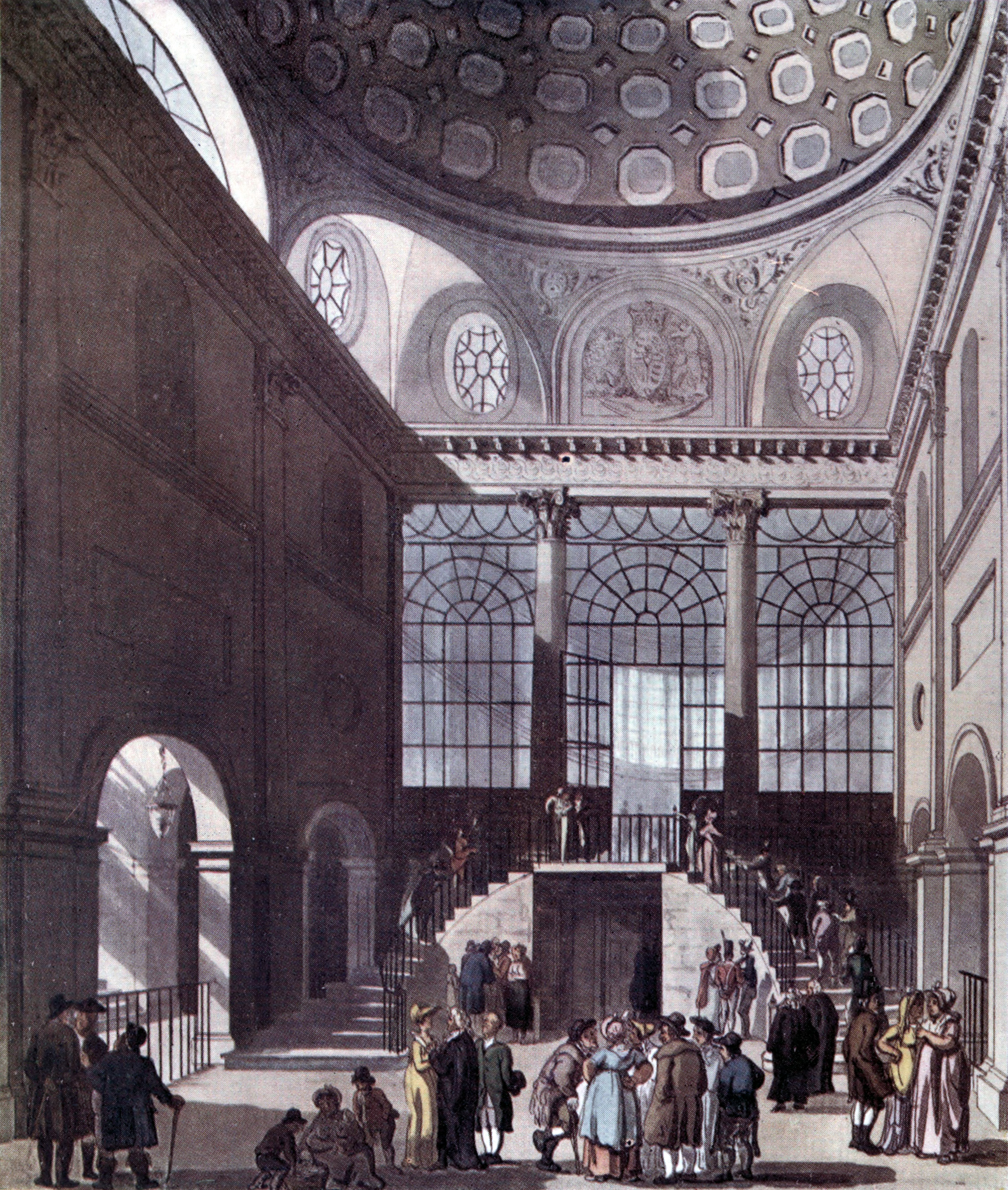
Session House, Clerkenwell 1810 engraved plate

The building was commissioned to replace Hicks Hall as the courthouse for the Middlesex Quarter Sessions: Hicks Hall had opened in 1612 and had stepped into many of the lesser functions of the Old Bailey before being demolished in 1782.

The Sessions House was designed by Thomas Rogers in the classical style and completed in 1782. In London 19th-century cant it was called X's Hall, an abbreviation of Hicks Hall. It served as the main judicial and administrative centre of Middlesex until county councils were created for Middlesex and London in 1889. At that point the Middlesex county leaders had no further use for the Sessions House because it was physically in the County of London rather than in Middlesex. Administrative matters relating to the county of Middlesex were immediately transferred to the Guildhall in Parliament Square. London County Council took over management of the Sessions House and continued to use it temporarily for magistrates' courts in its area. However, all remaining judicial business was transferred to the Sessions House in Newington Causeway in 1921.

From 1931 to 1973 the former Middlesex Sessions House served as the headquarters of Avery Weighing Machines, manufacturers of weighing-machines and scales. After that company's departure, the building fell into further disrepair until, in 1978, it was acquired and restored by a masonic trust and the following year opened as the London Masonic Centre, incorporating conference and social facilities.

In 2013 it was reported that the proprietors of Home House, a private members' club in London's West End, were in negotiations to acquire the building for use as a Clerkenwell Club. However, in 2014, the building was actually acquired by Oliver and Ted Grebelius of Sätila Studios, who converted it into a restaurant and bar.

== Architecture ==
The Sessions House is substantially larger than Hicks Hall and was built in the classical style with four huge Ionic order columns supporting a pediment. In contrast with the modest sessions houses of earlier days, the new Middlesex Sessions House, designed by Thomas Rogers, was built with imperial grandeur in its proportions and decoration. It was enlarged, and remodelled on all but the main front by Frederick Hyde Pownall in 1860. Above the central window was a relief of the head of King George III carved by John Charles Felix Rossi and Giovanni Battista Locatelli.

The dome which covers its entrance hall and staircase is a copy of that of the Pantheon in Rome.

== Cultural venue ==
In 2017, Burberry hosted the photographic exhibition Here We Are at Old Sessions House's Revelry Room which featured over 30 social and documentary photographers who made their aesthetic mark on the 20th Century, including Shirley Baker, Ken Russell, and Alasdair McLellan. Burberry's then-President Christopher Baily said at the time: "It seems the most complete. The U.K. is about class, and I think the Revelry Room has a lot to say about class."

In 2024, organisations Art Shield, Paradox Public Relations, and Dom Master Klass hosted the three-day art festival Kyiv Art Sessions at Old Sessions House as part of the "Preserving Art in Crisis" global campaign which featured works from 27 Ukrainian artists, including Hanna Kryvolap, Akhtem Seitablayev, Gamlet, and twin sisters Mishel and Nicol Feldman, also known as Sestry Feldman, who are two of Kyiv's most prominent street artists. Held on Old Sessions House's Principal Floors, the Kyiv Art Sessions festival won PRovoke Media's 2025 SABRE North America Award for "Educational and Cultural Institutions".
