= Key & See =

Variation of the TV Key service

Key & See is a variation of the TV Key service that forms part of the open, standards-based interactive TV services platform provided by Miniweb Interactive. Key & See allows viewers to access the interactive TV content made available by broadcasters and channel owners while leaving quarter of their screen tuned to the programme they are already watching Like TV Key, Key & See can be used with interactive TV services on UK satellite TV provider Sky Digital (BSkyB)

Key & See works in the same way as a TV Key but the numeric shortcut code is associated with a broadcaster and a particular TV channel or programme. Miniweb Interactive offers commercial brands and broadcasters the chance to utilise TV Key and Key & See technology as part of its interactive TV services platform
