= Sestry Feldman =

Ukrainian artist duo

- Mishel and Nicol Feldman 2025
- Born: Mishel Feldman; 1996 (age 29–30); Dnipropetrovsk, Dnipropetrovsk Oblast, Ukraine Nicol Feldman; 1996 (age 29–30); Dnipropetrovsk, Dnipropetrovsk Oblast, Ukraine
- Known for: Painting, Murals, Graffiti, Sculptures, Animation
- Notable work: Grow In Freedom Mural
- Style: Muralism
- Movement: Street art
- Website: sestry-feldman.com

Sestry Feldman is an artist duo consisting of twin sisters Mishel and Nicol Feldman, who are two of the most recognized street artists in Kyiv, Ukraine. Their resume includes street art, murals, canvas paintings, tarot cards, sculptures, animation, and scriptwriting. Working in the world of contemporary art as self-taught artists, many of their projects consist of combining graffiti art, bold colors, and Ukrainian folk symbols to create symbolic art with Ukrainian cultural ties, often while conveying a political message. They are also known for their vibrant cartoon-like murals that they have painted across Ukraine and other parts of Europe.

== Early life ==
Born in Dnipropetrovsk, Ukraine, in 1996, Sestry Feldman are from a family of six children. They attended school through 9th grade after which they were homeschooled. They did not meet their father until age 8 due to his incarceration as a political prisoner, for which he served four years of an eleven-year sentence. The sisters drew their father a portrait while he was imprisoned, which he called a "masterpiece" and was instrumental for Feldmans' decision to start a career as artists.

While still living in Dnipropetrovsk they were hired to create illustrations in an English language book for a rehabilitation center, after which they moved to Kyiv in 2014 and started creating street art and taking commissions for art projects, including album covers and book illustrations.

== Art career ==
The duo has gained recognition globally by participating in exhibitions in Kyiv, Brussels, Tel Aviv, and Paris, as well as creating murals in cities across Europe. They have also expanded their audience reach by participating in charity events supporting Ukraine, and by continuing their work on street art throughout the war in Ukraine. Another major milestone in their career was when they partnered with TsUM Kyiv in 2023 to create displays for Ukraine's largest department store.

=== Murals ===
For Mariupol From Brussels - Dnipro, Ukraine 2024

A large-scale, ten-story mural located on the side of a dormitory for migrants painted by Sestry Feldman in their home city of Dnipro. The imagery is colorful and cartoonish featuring their street character "YoYo" floating down the side of the tower using a flower to parachute over a large body of water towards a shoreside landscape. The painting includes a bright, blue sky dotted with pink clouds, sailboats floating along the coastline, along with bushy trees and buildings in the foreground creating a warm and inviting scene.
Grow in Freedom - Brussels, Belgium 2023

According to the Brussels Times and Odessa Journal, this mural was created in Brussels, Belgium dedicated to the anniversary of the Russian invasion. Located on the wall of CHU Saint-Pierre Hospital.
Drone-Cossack - Zaporizhzhia, Ukraine 2023

Located in Zaporizhzhia, Ukraine on the wall of an apartment building. Mural features a modernized Cossack flying an FPV (First Person View) drone carrying a grenade, created by Sestry Feldman. The mural reflects the large-scale use of weaponized drones during the Russo-Ukrainian war at the time the mural was created.
L'Escale - Port-Jerome, France 2022

A vibrant mural in Port-Jérôme, France depicting a colorful landscape in shades of pink, light purple, light blue, orange, and green. It features a Cossack and Viking as well as birds and flowers with a background of billowy clouds and stars. According to a profile piece done by France Info, the mural was created in honor of the friendship between France and Ukraine.
Jungle Cottage - Kyiv, Ukraine 2020

Created in Kyiv by Sestry Feldman, a tropical themed mural created on a two-story brick building brings a jungle vibe to the city. It has a dark brown background covered in light and dark green foliage with bright yellow lemons. Tropical birds with yellow eyes and beaks adorned with multi-colored feathers in shades of blue, yellow, green, and purple are perched among the clusters of leaves stretched along the exterior of the building.
The Gap - Kyiv, Ukraine (date unknown)

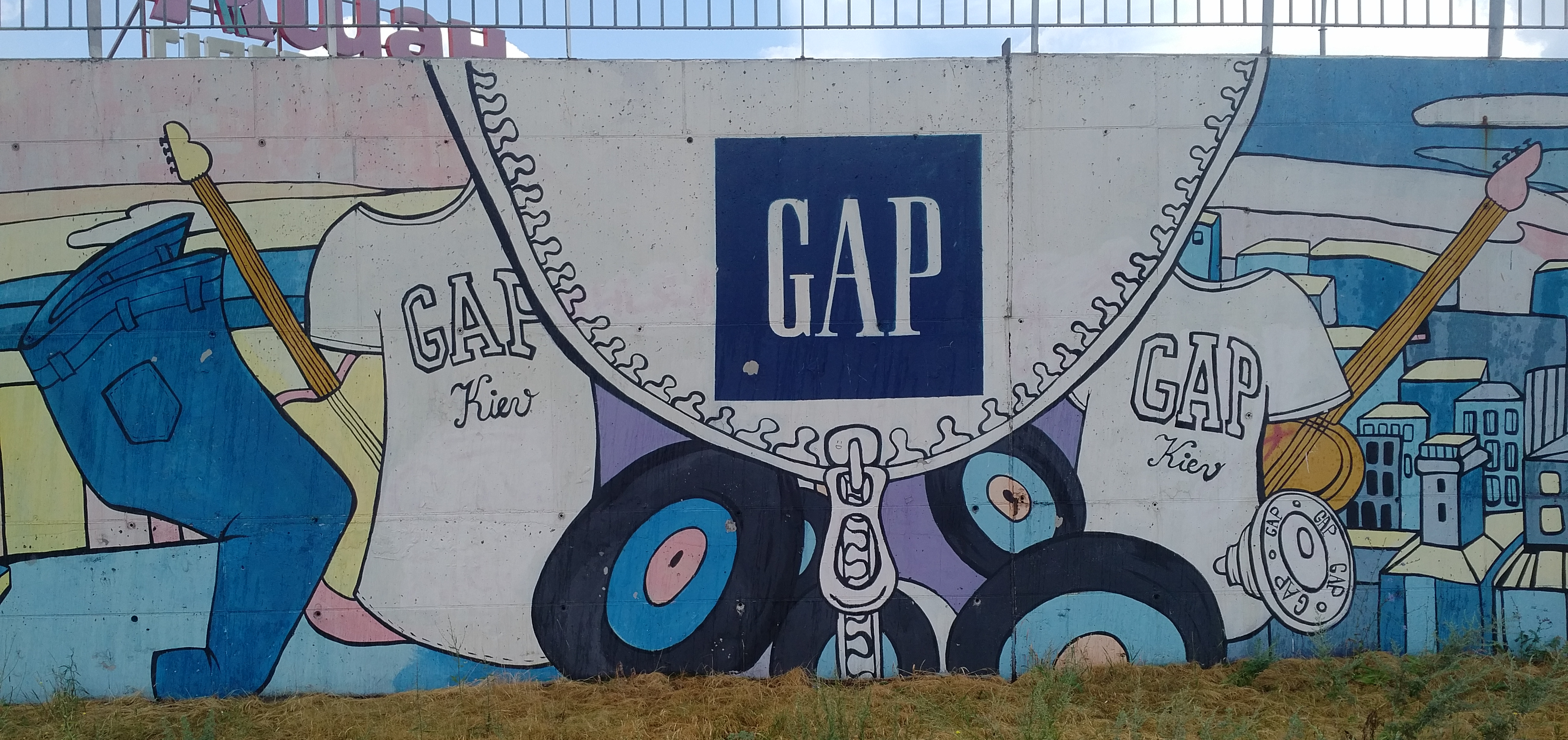

Gap clothing mural created by Sestry Feldman at the Skymall in Kyiv, Ukraine. The mural features a background with a city landscape where a suspension bridge runs alongside an urban skyline. In the foreground a zipper is unfastened exposing a Gap, Inc. clothing tag. To either side of the unfastened zipper are Gap t-shirts, jeans, a Gap jeans button, and electric guitars. Centered in the middle is a collection of vinyl record by Max Shepel)
The Empress - Kyiv, Ukraine (date unknown)
Located in Kyiv, Ukraine. Part of the tarot mural series done by Sestry Feldman. Mural features The Empress card.

=== Commercial art ===
Year	Project	Notes
2024	Bubibo	Sestry Feldman partnered with the pet-tech company Bubibo to create illustrations for the company's app. The company ended up winning the Shortlist award in the categories of Design and Corporate Identity at the Art Directors Club of Ukraine's ADC*UA awards for this project. The ADC*UA awards are part of a highly prestigious contest in Ukraine, which showcases the best Ukrainian advertising and communication design projects.
2023	TSUM Kyiv	Sestry Feldman partnered with Ukraine's largest department store, TSUM Kyiv, to create store displays as part of a campaign symbolizing re-birth. The purpose of the campaign was to create a positive atmosphere for citizens of Kyiv during the ongoing Russo-Ukrainian war.
2023	Tarot Cards	As part of a kickstarter project, the sisters created a series of Tarot cards based on their illustrations which helped them increase their popularity as artists.
2022	YoYo The Animated Series	In 2022, Sestry Feldman partnered with Studio 31 to create the animated series titled YoYo. The science fiction series takes place in the future and is based on humans' interaction with Artificial intelligence and how it controls their emotions, actions, and work productivity.

=== Artwork series ===
Year	Collection	Notes
2024	Technosapiens	Series of artwork created by Sestry Feldman focusing on the theme of technology and its impact on humans.
2023	Exit To The City	This collection transferred their character "Yoyo" from street walls to the gallery. The series focuses on visual relaxation and the perception of space with mainly urban characters as the subject matter. The collection includes canvas paintings as well as sculptures.

=== Exhibitions ===
Year	Exhibition	Host	Location	Notes
2025	Heat Ukraine Now	Dom Master Klass Ukrainian cultural centre and Art Shield	Old Sessions House London, England	This was an exhibition in support of Ukraine. The goal was to raise money in order to help Ukrainians living through winter conditions during wartime.
2024	Echoes and Visions	Art Shield and Paradox Public Relations	Old Sessions House London, England	This was an exhibition held in London featuring a number of Ukrainian artists, including the Feldman sisters. The exhibition was held in support of Ukraine during the ongoing Russo-Ukrainian war.
2023	Exit To The City	Ya Gallery	Ya Gallery Kyiv, Ukraine	Solo Exhibition. Featured their character YoYo. The series focused on visual relaxation and the perception of space.
2022	Reports From The War	Art Wall Gallery	Prague, Czech Republic	The exhibition featured a number or Ukrainian artists including Sestry Feldman, and focused on art as a form of protest with the use of reportage drawings.
2022	Withdraw The War	Draw Days Tel Aviv along with support from "Friends of Ukraine" and the Embassy of Ukraine.	Horace Richter Gallery Tel Aviv, Israel	It was a fifteen-day charity event showcasing Israeli and Ukrainian artists, including Sestry Feldman. The exhibit took place in an effort to raise money for Ukraine and to help people evacuate the country.

== Philanthropy ==
Sestry Feldman are humanitarians who have been very active in supporting Ukraine throughout the Russo-Ukrainian war. They have participated in multiple charity exhibitions and auctions throughout the war, selling their artwork in order to raise money to help aid Ukrainians in need of assistance, using their artistic skill to make a positive impact at the national level. The sisters also participated in a collaborative multinational mural project aimed at evoking change and understanding by creating an opportunity to start an open dialogue between Ukraine and the rest of the world. Their efforts have helped bring global awareness of the impact that the war has had on the country of Ukraine.

=== Grow In Freedom Mural ===
In 2022, the Ukrainian Institute and cultural agency Port teamed up as part of a multinational mural project in support of Ukraine during the Russo-Ukrainian war. The project was called The Wall, drawing inspiration from Pink Floyd's album of the same name, as the project's creators felt that the album's storyline related to the situation faced by the country of Ukraine during the war. The project involved the painting of murals in Vienna, Berlin, Marseille, Brussels, and Nairobi. The murals were painted by some of Ukraine's most prominent artists including, Nikita Kravtsov, Andriy Kalkov, Danylo Kovach, and Sestry Feldman.

Sestry Feldman contributed to the project by painting a mural in Brussels, Belgium, titled Grow In Freedom. Completed in 2023, the mural was a collaboration between Sestry Feldman and Belgian illustrator Teresa Zdralevich. The mural which was dedicated to the anniversary of the Russian invasion of Ukraine was painted on the wall of CHU Saint-Pierre hospital which has provided financial aid to Ukrainian hospitals during the Russo-Ukrainian war.

=== Echoes and Visions Exhibition ===
Starting in the summer of 2024, Sestry Feldman participated in a benefit exhibition hosted by ArtShield and Paradox Public Relations. The exhibition included established and emerging Ukrainian artists in an effort to bring awareness to the threat that the Russo-Ukrainian war had brought to Ukrainian art. It aimed at giving a platform to some of the best of Ukraine's artists and allow them to showcase their work.

=== Heat Ukraine Now Benefit Auction ===
During the month of February 2025, Sestry Feldman partnered with Art Shield and Paradox Public Relations again for the Heat Ukraine Now exhibition, which was used as a way to raise money to help Ukrainians living through hard winter conditions during wartime. It was a two-day benefit focused on collecting funds to warm and restore power to homes, hospitals, and military medical buildings damaged during the ongoing Russo-Ukrainian conflict. Heat Ukraine Now was part of the Kyiv Art Sessions series of exhibits which won PRovoke Media's 2025 SABRE North America Award in the category of "Educational and Cultural Institutions".

=== Pulse Ukraine and Core Benefit Auction ===
In December 2025, Sestry Feldman sisters partnered with Pulse Ukraine and Core to participate in a benefit auction on the artsy website. The auction was to help Core with their ongoing project to help Ukraine, with 100% of proceeds going to the charity.

== Filmography ==
Year	Title	Role	Notes
2023	Culture Quest	Guest	Season 2 Episode 1: Ukraine

== Awards ==
=== 2024 - VMSD Non-Holiday Window Displays ===
Sestry Feldman won first place in VMSD's International Visual Competition in the category of "Non-Holiday Window Displays" for their 2023 collaboration with department store TsUM Kyiv.

== See also ==
- List of Ukrainian artists
- List of twins
- OSGEMEOS, Brazilian twin street artists
