= Gamlet Zinkivsky =

Ukrainian artist (born 1986)

Gamlet Zinkivskyi, also known as 'Gamlet', is a contemporary artist, street muralist, and photographer from Ukraine's Kharkiv district. He is best known for his monochromatic public artworks combining minimalistic drawings with short philosophical text, many of which have become landmarks of Kharkiv's urban landscape. He represented Ukraine during the 55th Venice Biennale and is widely regarded as one of the country's leading contemporary street artists.

== Early life and education ==
Zinkivskyi was born in Kharkiv, Ukraine in 1986. He studied at the Kharkiv Art College before enrolling in the Department of Monumental Painting at the Kharkiv State Academy of Design and Arts. Although he did not complete his studies, his academic training influenced his later work in public art.

== Career ==
=== Street Art ===
Beginning in the 2000s, Zinkivskyi developed a practice that centered on public spaces.

His work has become closely associated with his hometown Kharkiv, where hundreds of his pieces have appeared throughout residential neighborhoods and industrial districts.

=== Contemporary Art ===
Alongside his signature street art, Zinkivskyi has exhibited internationally at museums, art galleries, and exhibitions. He was twice nominated for the PinchukArtCentre Prize in 2009 and 2011. In 2013, he represented Ukraine at the 55th International Art Exhibition - La Biennale di Venezia. For the Ukrainian Pavilion, he presented the projects In Solitude and The Book of People (an installation with hundreds of portraits made in matchboxes).

Zinkivskyi has also illustrated books, including Antenna by Serhiy Zhadan.

=== Russia's Invasion of Ukraine ===
Following Russia's invasion of Ukraine, Zinkivskyi remained in Kharkiv despite repeated shelling. Rather than leave the city, he stayed to produce new artworks on damaged buildings, boarded buildings, and bomb sites, documenting wartime through public installations.

Zinkivskyi's wartime installations in Kharkiv have attracted interest from international outlets including The New York Times, The Washington Post, and The Guardian.

== Legacy ==
Zinkivskyi is widely regarded as one of the defining figures of contemporary Ukrainian street art. His works have become closely identified with Kharkiv's cultural identity, and bridges street art, conceptual art, literature, and documentary observation, making him one of the most recognizable contemporary artists working in Ukraine.
