= WapTV =

Company which created the Worldwide TV Mark-up Language

- Type: Private
- Industry: Interactive television
- Founded: 1999
- Founders: Ian Valentine, Patrick Sansom, Andrew Andy Hynes
- Fate: Acquired by British Sky Broadcasting (partially in 2000, fully in 2001); spun off as Miniweb Interactive in 2007
- Successor: Miniweb Interactive
- Headquarters: United Kingdom
- Products: WTVML browser, WTVML markup language, interactive TV platform

WapTV, now Miniweb, is a British company which originated the WTVML (Worldwide TV Mark-up Language) as a content format for the delivery of Interactive TV applications using Internet Servers. The system is an Interactive television technology platform comprising a mobile browser, a markup language, and a significant collection of associated software tools and services.

The mobile browser and mark-up language are both based upon the Open Mobile Alliance WML 1.3 specification. The WTVML mobile browser is currently available only as an OpenTV application, although an MHP version of the WapTV browser has been built for demonstration and proof of concept. An emulator exists, based on Craftwork's, STBe OpenTV middleware emulation.

The WTVML markup language is a heavily extended superset of the WAP Forum WML 1.3 specification. WML content originally designed for wireless delivery to mobile phone handsets will work without modification on the WTVML platform, with the exception that any WBMP images will not appear on the Sky Interactive mobile rowser. WTVML version 6.1 was published as an ETSI standard in June 2004.

The mobile browser and the WTVML markup language were originally developed by Ian Valentine, Patrick Sansom Andrew Andy Hynes who founded WAPTV Ltd. The company and its technology was partly acquired by British Sky Broadcasting in 2000, and fully acquired in 2001. Platform development has continued within BSkyB, and version 7 of the mobile rowser and WTVML markup language was released in Q3 2004. The mobile rowser and WTVML markup then became the cornerstone of British Sky Broadcasting's interactive platform strategy.

The platform brings internet-style content and interactivity to the Sky Digital platform by deploying a purpose-built WML mobile browser to the Sky Digital set-top-box over the satellite broadcast stream. Web site owners simply have to serve well formatted WTVML from their web servers to allow Sky set-top boxes and consumers to fully interact with their web services. In March 2007, Sky together with some of the Waptv founders "spun off" the technology into a new Company "Miniweb", with the goals of furthering the work on WTVML in a global forum, and enabling the deployment of the system in other networks and devices.

One of the goals in the foundation of Miniweb Interactive was to facilitate the interoperability of Interactive TV content and Services across multiple types of TV network and devices, as it was considered that a lack of TV Centric internet standards has inhibited the ubiquitous deployment of Internet services to TVs once they become connected via Broadband. Hence the name "Miniweb" so called because the TVML technology had the capability of creating a "mini web" of TV Sites (Apps) which inter-operated across different TV middleware and chip-sets.

New IPTV networks require a TV browser in their set-top boxes, and various solutions are available. However, as of 2007, the WTVML mobile browser was probably the most widely deployed TV browser and had a growing community of compatible interactive TV sites.

TV Sites for the OpenTV based mobile browsers are therefore web sites with a WTVML skin, and are often given a "wtv." sub-domain rather than a "www." sub-domain. Until the introduction of Sky HD in 2006, most Sky set-top boxes uses a standard 28.8 kbit/s modem to pull content across the online link. Because WTVML content is compiled into an encoded format by an online gateway before transmission, it must be decoded on the set-top-box before it can be drawn to the screen. For optimal performance it is recommended that WTVML files (decks) for download are no more than 70 K in size, with individual cards within each deck no more than 5 K in size. When fully loaded, the browser comprises three separate virtual layers, devoted to MPEG-4 & JPEG still image presentation, MPEG video presentation and OnScreen Display (OSD) presentation respectively.

Developers can combine modes to produce very rich and diverse interactive TV interfaces. Multiple modes can be defined as a modeset. Different modes in the modeset can be referenced from the WML cards and associated with service domains, allowing the browser to change its style as the user navigates from one service to another. A modeset is a collection of one or more modes defined in a standalone XML file. A modeset is referenced at deck level from the mode attribute of the wml element. A developer can define multiple modes within a single modeset, and can initiate changes between Modes within that Modeset at card level.

The mobile browser can access Broadcast Resources as well as online resources delivered from a WTVML enabled web server. Broadcast Resources are content elements that are delivered in the satellite broadcast stream.

A doset can be used to specify a set of menu dos that can be easily applied to many cards and across many services. The doset is defined in an XML file that is referenced from the dosrc attribute of the modeset element. A single doset can be referenced by multiple modesets, and so can easily be applied across multiple domains and services.

The names and locations of font resources for use within a service are defined by an XML document usually called fontset.xml. This document must be available from a URL, and is referred to from the fontsrc attribute of the WML.
