= Hanna Kryvolap =

Ukrainian painter

Kryvolap Hanna
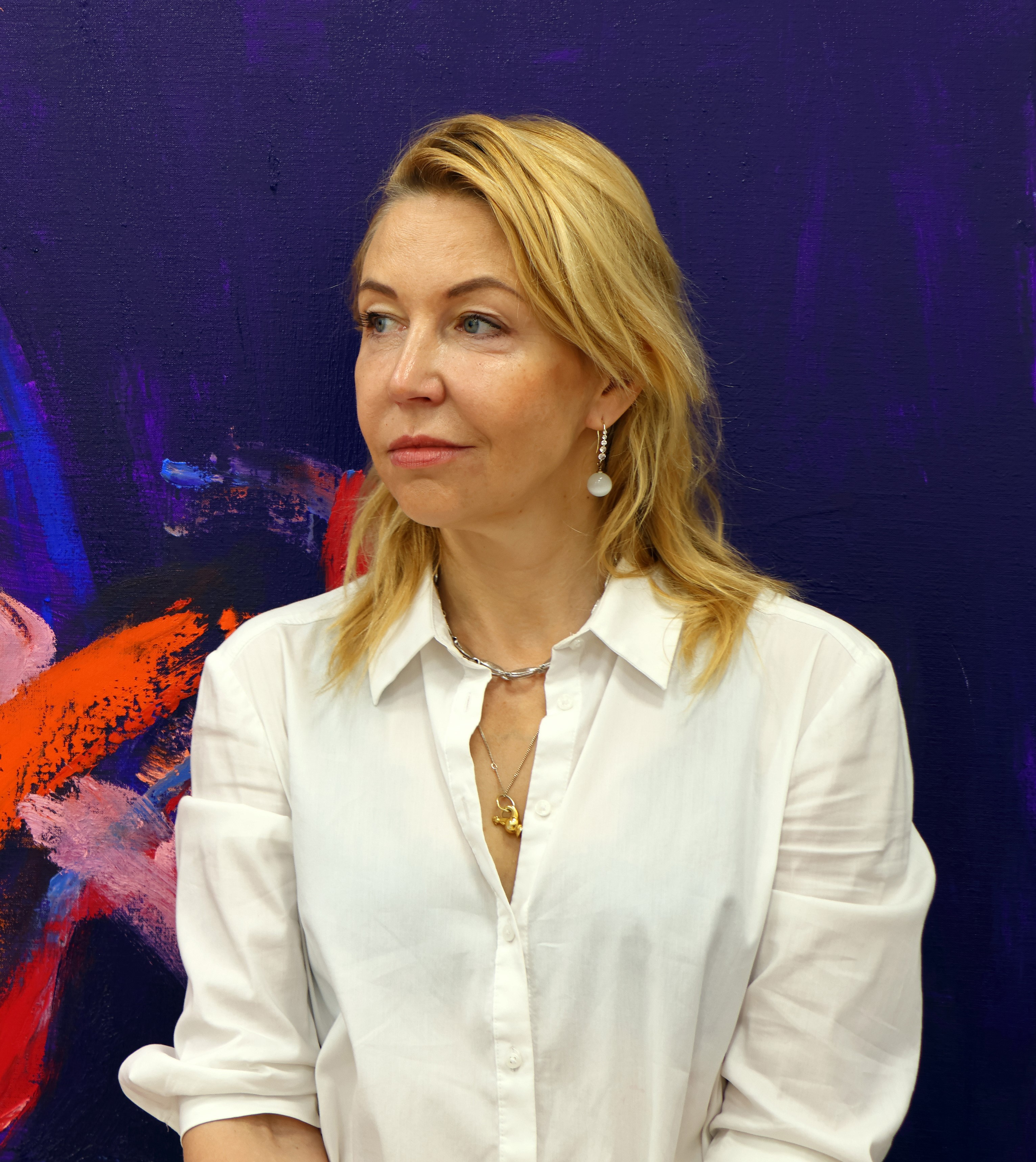
- Born: April 26, 1977 (age 48); Kyiv, Ukraine
- Education: Taras Shevchenko State Art Secondary School, National Academy of Fine Arts and Architecture
- Known for: painting

Hanna Kryvolap (born 26 April 1977) is a Ukrainian painter known for her contributions to abstract expressionism and fauvism . She has been a member of the National Union of Artists of Ukraine since 2001. Kryvolap lives and works in Ukraine.

== Biography ==
Hanna Kryvolap was born in Kyiv, Ukraine, to artist Anatoliy Kryvolap and Zinaida Vasina, an ethnographer and researcher of Ukrainian national dress. She began painting in childhood under the guidance of her parents.

From 1989 to 1995, she studied at the Taras Shevchenko State Art School, where her teachers included Zoya Lerman and Oleh Zhyvotkov. In 2001, she graduated from the National Academy of Fine Arts and Architecture, studying in Dmytro Lider's workshop.

Kryvolap held her first solo exhibition in Tbilisi, Georgia, in 1990 at the age of 13. Since then, her works have been exhibited internationally in countries such as Germany, the USA, Switzerland, Turkey, the Netherlands, France, and Montenegro. Her works are featured in the collections of the U.S. Embassy in Ukraine, the Museum of Modern Art of Ukraine (Kyiv), Zaporizhzhia Regional Art Museum, and the Museum of Young Art (Vienna, Austria), as well as in private collections worldwide.

== Art career ==
Hanna Kryvolap work blends elements of abstract expressionism, fauvism, and motifs inspired by Ukrainian folk art. Her notable series include:

The artist's main series include the following:

=== Horizons ===
The "Horizons" series captures panoramic views of cities from a bird’s-eye perspective, emphasizing color, form, and atmosphere rather than literal representation.

Ribbons

This series explores Ukrainian traditions, inspired by a wedding ritual where girls tie ribbons to fences to express their wishes. Kryvolap’s expressive use of color transforms this practice into contemporary art.

Wells

Dedicated to the cultural significance of wells in Ukrainian identity, this series depicts diverse styles of wells from various regions of Ukraine. The project began in 2006.

Involvement

In "Involvement," Kryvolap draws on her experiences with ancient mosaics, using short, rectangular strokes to create monumentality and a sense of connection to history.

Dynamics of Galician Baroque

This series reflects Kryvolap’s dialogue with 18th-century sculptor Johann Georg Pinsel, combining baroque energy with elements of her previous series such as "Ribbons" and "Involvement.

Plastic variations

Born from experiments with body art, this series captures figures in motion, translating their energy into colorful, dynamic compositions.

Abstract compositions

Kryvolap’s abstract works emphasize the emotional and psychological impact of color, aiming to evoke subconscious impulses and free the viewer from literal interpretation.

== Selected solo exhibitions ==
- 1990: First solo exhibition, Union of Artists, Tbilisi, Georgia.
- 1999, 1996: Exhibitions at Irena Gallery, Kyiv, Ukraine.
- 2005: German Embassy, Kyiv, Ukraine.
- 2013: Museum of Young Art (MOYA), Vienna, Austria.
- 2015: Ukrainian Institute of America, New York, USA.
- 2022: "Dialogue of Traditions", Andrey Sheptytskyi National Museum, Lviv, Ukraine.
- 2023: "Light through Darkness", Museum of the History of Kyiv, Ukraine.
- 2024: "Spectrum", Museum of the Diaspora of Ukraine, Kyiv.

== Participation in international exhibitions ==
- 2007: Art Kyiv, Ukrainian House, Kyiv, Ukraine.
- 2008: Internationale Kunstmesse, Sindelfingen, Germany.
- 2010: Art Palm Beach Miami International, Miami, USA.
- 2013: CONTEXT Art Miami, Miami, USA.
- 2014: Art Festival "Sarajevo Winter", Bosnia and Herzegovina.

== Honours ==
- 2023: Grand Prix at the All-Ukrainian Triennial of Painting for the work "Identification".
- 2021: Kyiv Art Prize for the series "Capitals of the World" (2018-2020).
- 2013: First prize of the All-Ukrainian Triennial of Painting.
