= Great North Road (Great Britain) =

Historic road between London and Edinburgh

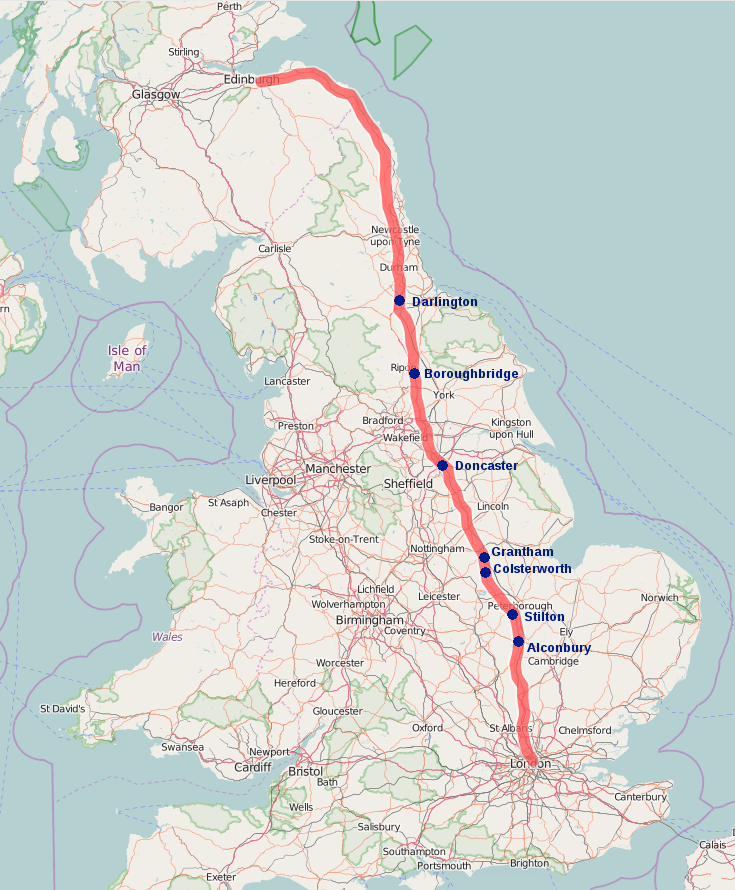
Line of the Great North Road from London to Edinburgh

The Great North Road was the main highway between England and Scotland from medieval times until the 20th century. It became a coaching route used by mail coaches travelling between London, York and Edinburgh.

The modern A1 mainly parallels the route of the Great North Road. Coaching inns, many of which survive, were staging posts providing accommodation, stabling for horses and replacement mounts. Nowadays virtually no surviving coaching inns can be seen while driving on the A1, because the modern route bypasses the towns in which the inns are found.

== Route ==
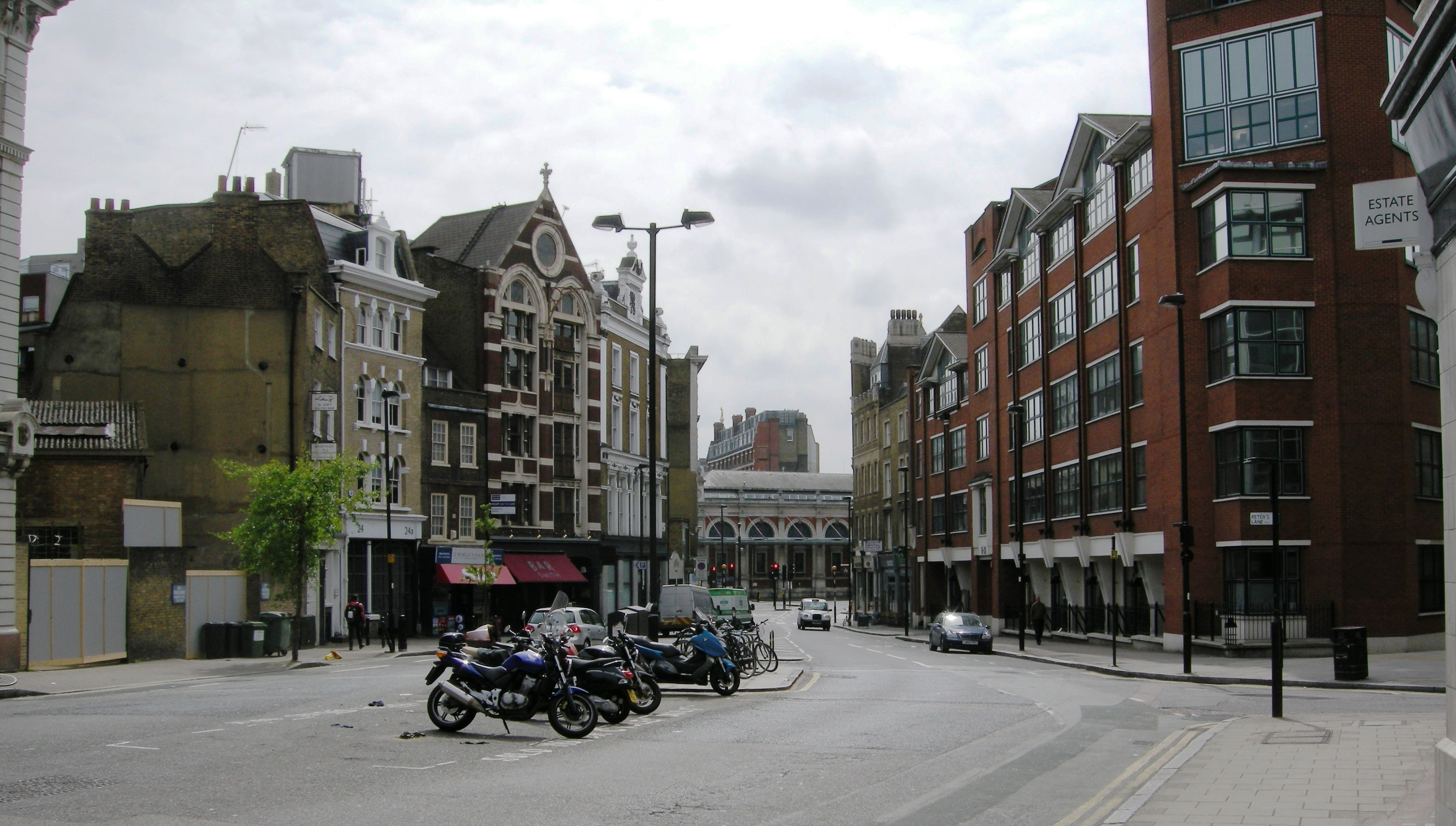
Southern end of St John Street in London, with Smithfield Market visible in the distance. The island in the middle of the road marks the former site of Hicks Hall

The traditional start point for the Great North Road was Smithfield Market on the edge of the City of London. The initial stretch of the road was St John Street which begins on the boundary of the city (the site of the former West Smithfield Bars), and runs through north London. Less than a hundred metres up St John Street, into Clerkenwell, stood Hicks Hall, the first purpose-built sessions house for the Middlesex justices of the peace. The hall was built in 1612, on an island site in the middle of St John Street (where St John's Lane branches to the west); this building was used as the initial datum point for mileages on the Great North Road (despite not being located at the very start of the road). Its site continued to be used for this purpose even after the building was demolished in 1782.

The Great North Road followed St John Street to the junction at the Angel Inn where the local road name changes from St John Street to Islington High Street.

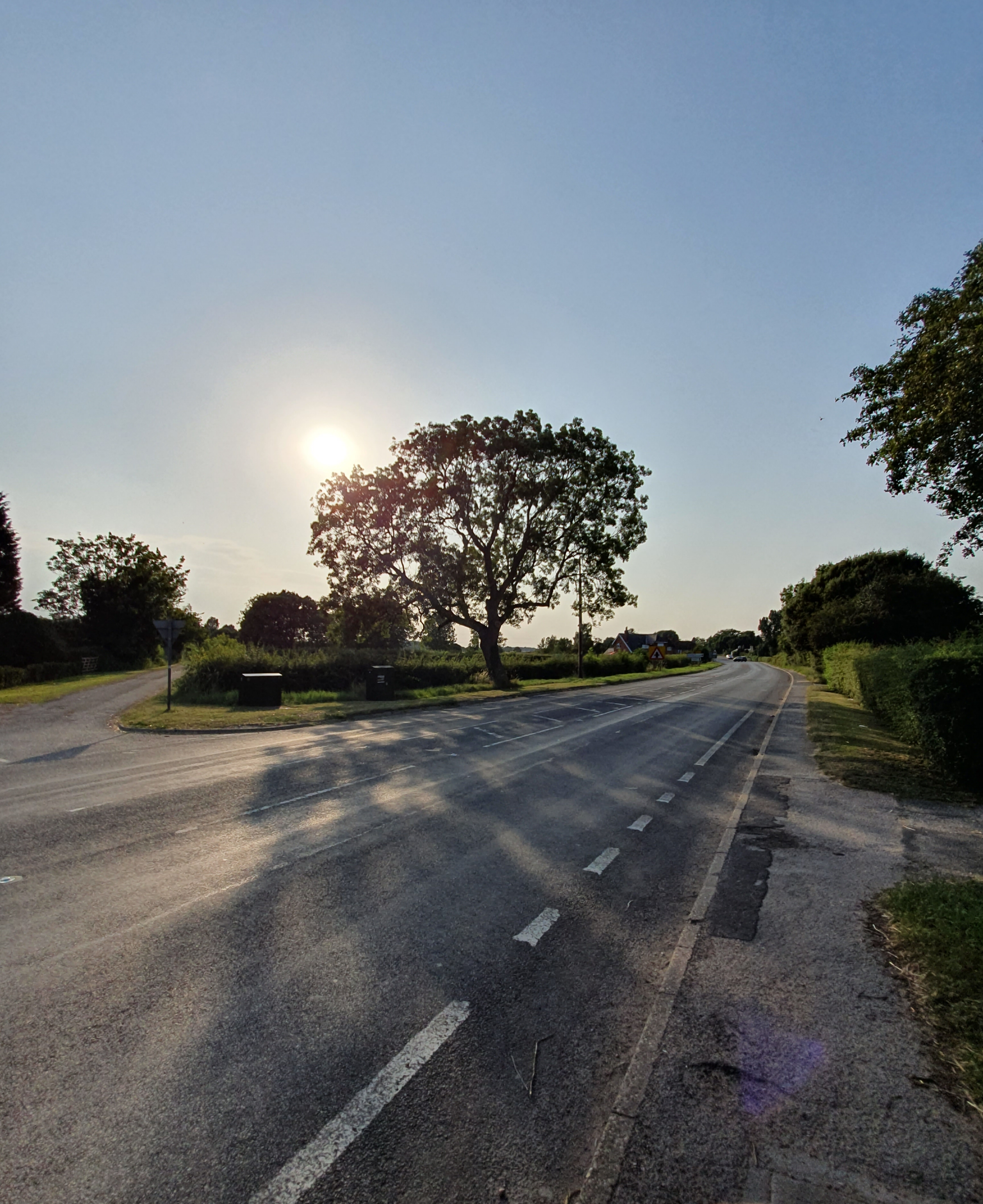
The Great North Road, through Sutton-on-Trent

When the General Post Office at St Martin's-le-Grand, in the historic Aldersgate ward, was built in 1829, coaches started using an alternative route, now the modern A1 road, beginning at the Post Office and following Aldersgate Street and Goswell Road before joining the old route close to the Angel. The Angel Inn was an important staging post. From Highgate the original route is bypassed and is now called the A1000 road through Barnet to Hatfield. From there it largely followed the course of the current B197 road through Stevenage to Baldock. Roughly taking the route of the A1, the next stages were Biggleswade and Alconbury, again replete with traditional coaching inns.

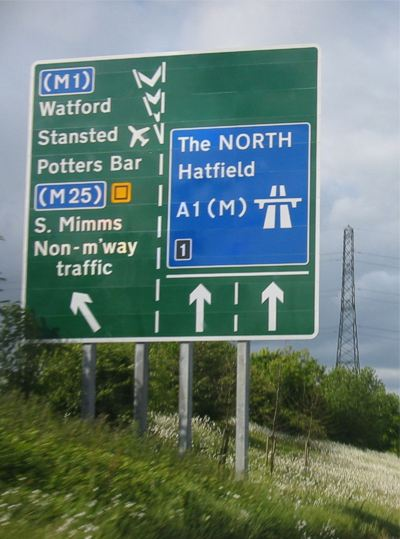
The A1 at South Mimms, Hertfordshire, approaching Junction 1 with the M25 and A1(M)

At Alconbury, the Great North Road joined the Old North Road, an older route which followed the Roman Ermine Street. Here a milestone records mileages to London via both routes: 65 by the Old North Road and 68 by the Great North Road. From Alconbury the Great North Road follows the line of Ermine Street north, through Stilton, and crossed the River Nene at Wansford.

Ermine Street crossed the River Welland about a mile to the west of what is now the town of Stamford. The Great North Road passed through the centre of Stamford, with two very sharp bends, re-joined the alignment of Ermine Street just before Great Casterton and continued as far as Colsterworth (at the A151 junction). Inns on this section included the George at Stamford and the Bell Inn at Stilton, the original sellers of Stilton cheese. The section of the road between Wadesmill in Hertfordshire and Stilton was the first turnpike (toll) road, by the Road Repair (Hertfordshire, Cambridgeshire, and Huntingdonshire) Act 1663 (15 Cha. 2. c. 1).

At Colsterworth, the Great North Road diverges west of the Roman road and continues through Grantham, Newark, Retford and Bawtry to Doncaster. North of Doncaster the Great North Road again follows a short section of Ermine Street, the Roman Rigg or Roman Ridge. Further north the Great North Road crossed the Roman Dere Street near Boroughbridge from where it continued via Dishforth and Topcliffe to Northallerton and then through Darlington, Durham and Newcastle, on to Edinburgh. A road forked to the left at the bridge in Boroughbridge to follow Dere Street, and Scotch Corner to Penrith and on to Glasgow. Part of this route was the original A1, with a local road from Scotch Corner via Barton to Darlington making the link back to the old Great North Road.

In the first era of stage coaches York was the terminus of the Great North Road. Along the route, Doncaster–Selby–York was superseded by Doncaster–Ferrybridge–Wetherby–Boroughbridge–Northallerton–Darlington, the more direct way to Edinburgh, the final destination. The first recorded stage coach operating from London to York was in 1658 taking four days. Faster mail coaches began using the route in 1786, stimulating a quicker service from the other passenger coaches. In the "Golden Age of Coaching", between 1815 and 1835, coaches could travel from London to York in 20 hours, and from London to Edinburgh in 45 1/2 hours. In the mid-nineteenth century coach services could not compete with the new railways. The last coach from London to Newcastle left in 1842 and the last from Newcastle to Edinburgh in July 1847.

== Cultural references ==
The highwayman Dick Turpin's flight from London to York in less than 15 hours on his mare Black Bess is the most famous legend of the Great North Road. Various inns along the route claim Turpin ate a meal or stopped for respite for his horse. Harrison Ainsworth, in his 1834 romance Rookwood, immortalised the ride. Historians argue that Turpin never made the journey, claiming that the ride took place 50 years before Turpin by John Nevison, "Swift Nick", a 17th-century highwayman who was born and grew up at Wortley near Sheffield. It is claimed that Nevison, in order to establish an alibi, rode from Gad's Hill, near Rochester, Kent, to York (some 190 miles (310 km)) in 15 hours.

The Winchelsea Arms, an inn on a long straight section of the Great North Road near Stretton, Rutland, was reputed to be another haunt of Dick Turpin. It was later renamed the Ram Jam Inn after a story from the coaching days. A coach passenger undertook to show the landlady the secret of drawing both mild and bitter beer from the same barrel. Two holes were made and she was left with one thumb rammed against one and the other jammed into the other; the trickster then made off.

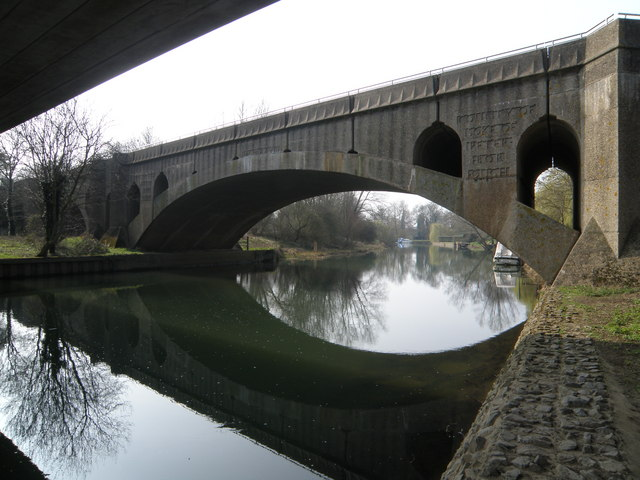
The 1920s Wansford bridge carrying the Great North Road over the River Nene, the boundary between the Soke of Peterborough and Huntingdonshire

In literature, Jeanie Deans of Sir Walter Scott's novel The Heart of Midlothian travels through several communities on the Great North Road on her way to London. The road features in The Pickwick Papers by Charles Dickens. Part of the J. B. Priestley novel The Good Companions mentions the road, which represented to protagonist Jess Oakroyd (a Yorkshireman) the gateway to such 'exotic' destinations as Nottingham. The Lord Peter Wimsey short story "The Fantastic Horror of the Cat in the Bag" by Dorothy L. Sayers features a motorcycle chase along it. Similarly, Ruined City by Nevil Shute features an all night drive from Henry Warren's house in Grosvenor Square, Mayfair, along the road as far as Rowley and then to Greenhead near Hadrian's Wall, where Warren is dropped off to go walking. His chauffeur, keen to get home for a date with the maid, is killed near Retford. In Cassandra Clare's Clockwork Princess, the third volume of The Infernal Devices trilogy, Will Herondale takes the road after leaving London on his way to Wales to find Tessa Gray. The road also features in The War of the Worlds by H. G. Wells, as the protagonists' brother tries to cross the Great North Road somewhere near Barnet, through a frenzied exodus of refugees from London, driven north by the approach of Martians from the south.

In the oft-quoted first part of his essay England Your England, writer George Orwell refers to the "to-and-fro of the lorries on the Great North Road" as being a characteristic fragment of English life.

The road is mentioned in Mark Knopfler's song, "5:15 AM", from the album Shangri La. The High Road mentioned in Loch Lomond is also a reference to it. The song "Heading South on the Great North Road" on Sting's 2016 album 57th & 9th refers to the Great North Road in paying tribute to artists from the North East who found success in London.

== See also ==
- National Cycle Route 1
- A1000, a main road in the United Kingdom, running north from Highgate, north London for approximately 20 miles to Welwyn, parts of which are on the route of the Great North Road and still bear the name.
- A10 (in certain sections known as Great Cambridge Road or Old North Road) a main road in the United Kingdom, running north from London Bridge to King's Lynn.
