= WTVML =

XML content format

WTVML is an XML-based and WML-derived content format designed to allow web site operators to easily develop and deploy Interactive TV services, typically it reduces the time taken for web site operators to create a TV Site, and results in the Site being deployable on a larger number of devices, and is capable of being automatically validated, tested and transformed.

WTVML was originally developed by Ian Valentine and Patrick Sansom in a company called WapTV. After demonstrating the ability to develop Interactive TV services using web infrastructures and XML, and successfully deploying them to existing TV set-top-boxes over dial up modems, the company was acquired by BSkyB. The technology was first used to launch Sky's interactive betting service on December 6, 2000, and later became the basis of a large number of "red button" channel portals and internet based interactive services.

The format follows a strict XML syntax (DTD) that has been developed in response to multiple user requirements by BSkyB, and is now being enhanced by Miniweb Interactive. The format was standardized through ETSI as TS 102 322.

WTVML has the potential to unify the Interactive TV content creation industry, which has been hampered by proprietary "middlewares" and a lack of browser standards.

The fragmentation of technologies available to build Digital TV platforms has meant that typical web site operators have had no common content format available to them to allow them to develop their TV Site once, and deploy it unchanged across multiple networks and devices.

Some newer set-top boxes (particularly IPTV devices) use various versions of HTML browsers. Many of these have proprietary TV extensions, and different deployment characteristics, which result in untested services being deployed unfaithfully or worse with run-time errors. Due to the need for explicit layouts, as well as other reasons, many designers attempting to create TV Style services using HTML browsers need to make extensive use of JavaScript, which has the result of further inhibiting interoperability, and requires manual testing of a service before it is deployed by the majority of networks, thus essentially closing a network from open internet access.

WTVML services can be automatically and dynamically transformed into various forms of HTML/JS/CSS, making them compatible with traditional web browsers as well as WTVML native browsers, and allowing the network operator to manage his platform specific features independently from the standard used by the web site authors. WTVML follows a web 2.0 style model, in that complete applications are DTD driven, allowing TV Style services to be created without the use of Script.

Between 2000 and 2008 the industry, including the DVB,

== See also ==
- waptv
- Portable Content Format
