= TV Site =

Website designed for viewing on a TV set

A TV site is a website designed for viewing on a television set.

Unlike mobile and PC access, the use of internet sites through the TV has been small, mostly due to the poor user experience of many "web on TV" deployments, and the "walled garden" or closed platform business models adopted by many TV network operators.

With the advent of IPTV and Broadband enabled TV Devices web site owners have realized, that like Mobile, TV needs to be considered as a different media, and that Mobile, TV and PC based internet access all present different user interface design challenges in order to make the services usable and acceptable to consumers on the device they are using.

TV Sites can be developed and deployed using a number of different technologies including Adobe Flash, WTVML, Java and HTML, although the same design principles apply whatever the development technology.

Typically TV Sites are differentiated from other web sites by having a "wtv." rather than a "www." subdomain.

== Interfaces ==
The following styles of interface are often considered:

- The "one foot" user experience - used to describe mobile apps, which are typically "personal" and used at a short distance from the device
- The "three foot" user experience - used to describe PC applications, which are typically used "personal" and accessed via a PC, with mouse, windows and a high resolution screen
- The "10-foot user interface" - used to describe TV applications, which are typically used in a "shared" environment, via a TV, with only a TV remote control as the input mechanism

These interfaces are characterized as follows:

- Mobile: narrow screen 1D scrolling, simplified layout, limited graphics and media types, limited transactional capability, limited keyboard, no pointer (see Post-WIMP)
- PC: wide screen, scrollable interfaces, complex layouts, complex media types, fully transactional, keyboard, pointer
- TV: wide screen, explicit layout, embedded scrolling, limited media types, video support, fully transactional, limited keyboard, no pointer
