= Motu =

Motu or MOTU may refer to:

== Places ==
- Motu (geography), a reef islet formed by broken coral and sand surrounding an atoll
  - Motu Nao, Marquesas Islands
  - Motu Nui, near Easter Island
  - Motu Oa, Marquesas Islands
  - Motu One (Society Islands), south Pacific Ocean
  - Motu Paahi, French Polynesia
- Motu (tribal area), Niue
- Mōtū River, New Zealand
- Motu, New Zealand, a settlement near Matawai

== Given name ==
- Motu Hafoka (born 1987), Samoan footballer
- Motu Matu'u (born 1987), New Zealand rugby union player
- Motu Tony (born 1981), Samoan-born New Zealand rugby league player

== Fictional characters ==
- Motu, from the comic/TV show Motu Patlu
- Motu, a fictional rat from Pakdam Pakdai

== Other uses ==
- Motu people
- Motu language, a language of Papua New Guinea
- Motu proprio, a type of Papal document
- Mark of the Unicorn (MOTU), a maker of professional audio hardware and software
- Masters of the Universe (MOTU), an action figure line of the 1980s, commonly abbreviated as MotU or MOTU
- Masters of the Universe (MOTU), maintainers of the community-supported components of the Ubuntu operating system
- Motu Economic and Public Policy Research a research institute from New Zealand

== See also ==
- De Motu (disambiguation)
- Motu Iti (disambiguation)
- Motu One (disambiguation)
- Motuloa (disambiguation)
- Motus (disambiguation)
- Temotu (disambiguation)
