= Motus =

Motus may refer to:

== Commerce ==
- Motus Holdings, a South African non-manufacturing automotive group
- Motus, LLC, a workforce management company
- Motus Motorcycles, maker of the Motus MST vehicle
- Motus O dance theatre, a dance company
- Motusbank, a Canadian online-only bank

== Media ==
- The Path of Motus, a video game

== Other ==
- The Motus Wildlife tracking network

== See also ==
- Motu (disambiguation)
- Mottus
