= De motu animalium (disambiguation) =

De motu animalium (Movement of Animals) is a treatise by Aristotle.

Later works using the same title (not including numerous commentaries on the Aristotelian work) are:

- De motu animalium by Giovanni Alfonso Borelli (1608-1679)
- De motu animalium spontaneo by Pierre Petit (1617-1687)

== See also ==
- De Motu
