= Nicolas Venette =

French physician (1633–1698)

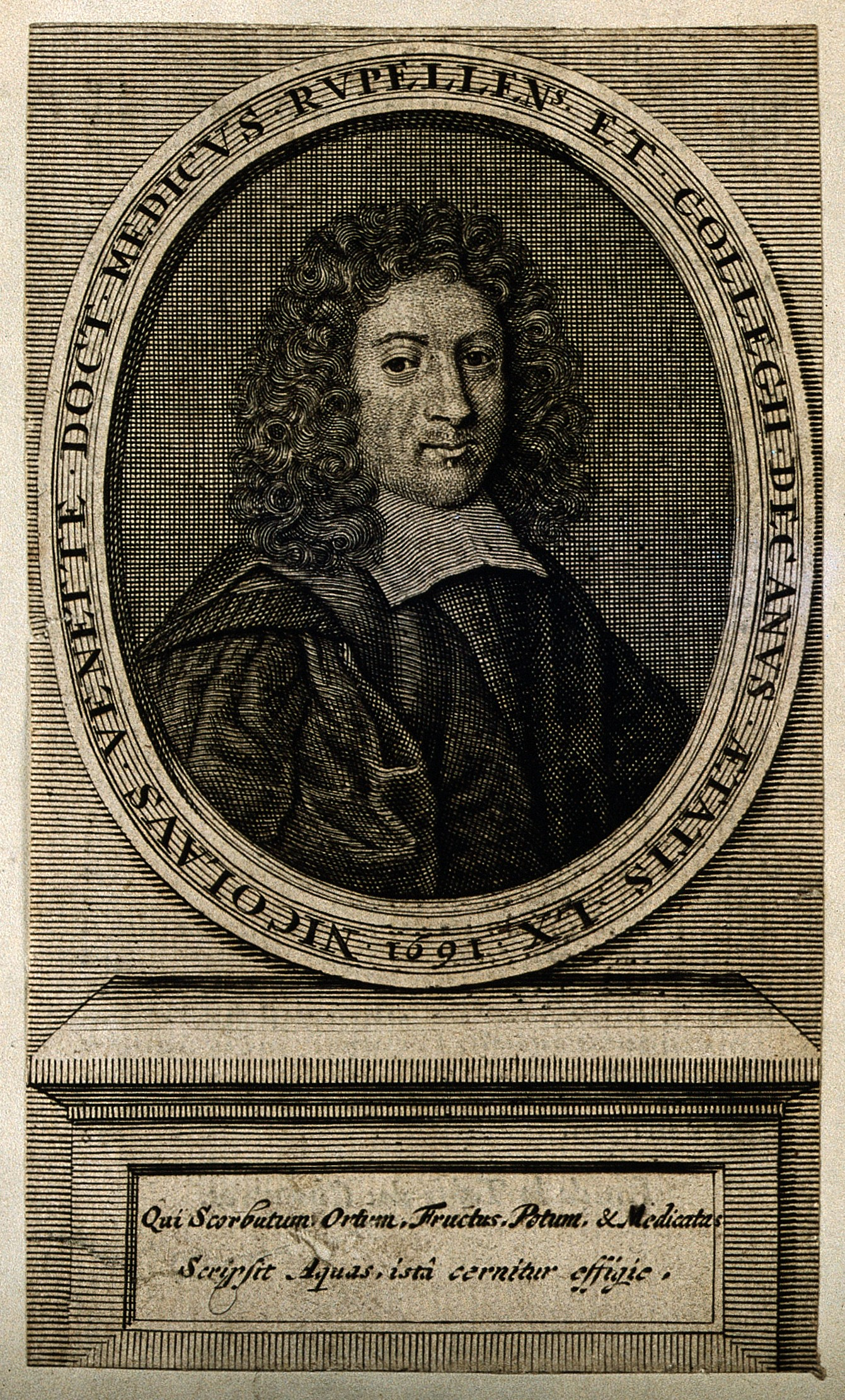
- Nicolas Venette; Credit: Wellcome Library
- Born: May 28, 1633
- Died: August 18, 1698 (aged 65)
- Known for: Father of Sexology
- Spouse: Marie Texler
- Children: 11
- Scientific career
- Theses: Traité du scorbut; Tableau de l’amour conjugal, ou l'Histoire complète de la génération de l’homme
- Academic advisors: Guy Patin; Pierre Petit

Nicolas Venette (28 May 1633–18 August 1698) was a physician, sexologist and French writer. He has also been identified as the writer of an anonymous work on nightingales Traite du rossignol published in 1697.

== Biography ==
Born in La Rochelle, he studied medicine at Bordeaux where he received his doctorate in 1656. He then went to Paris where he studied under Guy Patin and Pierre Petit, before travelling to Spain, Portugal and Italy. He then returned to La Rochelle working as a doctor at the Charite hospital in 1664, Saint-Louis hospital in 1669 while also becoming Regius Professor of Anatomy and Surgery in 1668.

He married Marie Texler in 1673 and they had eleven children.

== Works ==
In 1671, Venette wrote Traité du scorbut (Treatise on scurvy), and the better known Tableau de l’amour conjugal, ou l'Histoire complète de la génération de l’homme. This book, published in 1686 in Amsterdam under the title Tableau de l'amour humain considéré dans l'état du mariage (Table of human love considered in the state of marriage) and under the pseudonym Salocini Venetian (anagram of Nicolas Venette) is considered to be the first treatise on sexology in West. It proved to be a bestseller and was translated into English, Spanish, German and Dutch. There were 33 editions published sporadically until 1903.

The author discusses four sub-topics with respect to sex: anatomy, reproduction, desire, and impotence/infertility. For each topic, he reviews ancient and medieval authors, adding his own observations or those of later authors, and comments where common sense prevails. The resulting composition has an ambiguous mixture of seriousness and light-heartedness bordering upon erotic literature.

According to André Dupras, Venette proposes a solution to the crisis of love that exists in his time, advocating a balance between impetuous lovers and religious imperatives. On the one hand, it seeks to defuse the fears of people regarding sex, and to change overall pessimistic views towards love and sexuality. On the other hand, it invites the reader to tame romantic passions by reason and respect for natural laws. The book is not only an instruction manual that provides information on sexuality, it also aims to educate by offering a new way of being and living love in the state of marriage.

A book from 1697 Traité du rossignol on the biology of nightingales is thought to have been written by Venette. This book had nine chapters and incorporated original studies including dissections of nightingales to identify their singing abilities. He was the first to record migratory restlessness (now known as zugunruhe) in nightingales.

== Legacy ==
A street in La Rochelle is named in honour of Venette.

== Sources ==
- Jean Flouret, Nicolas Venette : médecin rochelais, 1633-1698 : étude biographique et bibliographique
