= Nicholas de la Fontaine =

Protestant refugee

Nicholas de la Fontaine was a Protestant refugee in Geneva who entered the service of John Calvin as his secretary. De la Fontaine brought Michael Servetus to trial on August 14, 1553 on the charges of heresy against Calvinism, as Calvin himself at this point was too incapacitated with various health problems to personally appear at the trial.

== The Complaint of Nicholas de la Fontaine Against Servetus ==
In 1553, de la Fontaine published a list of "complaints" against Servetus regarding his supposedly heretical activities. There were originally forty articles in this text, but before the trial, this number was reduced to thirty-eight. Notable excerpts from the list include:

VIII: To wit, whether he has not written and falsely taught and published that to believe in a single essence of God there are three distinct persons, the Father, the Son, and the Holy Ghost, is to create four phantoms, which cannot and ought not to be imagined.

XXXII: Item, that little children are sinless, and moreover are incapable of redemption until they come of age.

XXXIV: Item, that the baptism of little children is an invention of the Devil, an infernal falsehood tending to the destruction of all Christianity.

XXXIX: Item, that in the person of M. Calvin, minister of the word of God in the Church of Geneva, he has defamed with printed book the doctrine which he preached, uttering all the injurious and blasphemous things which it is possible to invent.
