= Auguste Dide =

French Protestant pastor and politician (1839–1918)

- Born: 1839
- Died: 1918

Auguste Dide (4 April 1839 – 16 March 1918) was a French Protestant pastor and politician of the extreme left during the Third Republic. He was born in Vézénobres.

During the Second Empire he was exiled to Switzerland, but he returned to France after an amnesty, and continued his theological studies in Strasbourg. He then became a pastor, in Gard and then in Paris.

Dide was senator for Gard from 1885 to 1889.

Dide was part of a group responsible for creating a statue of Michael Servetus.

Dide died in Nice on 16 March 1918 at the age of 78.
