= De Motu =

De Motu is Latin for 'On Motion' and is used as the title, or in the title, of a number of notable works:

- De Motu (Berkeley's essay), fully De Motu: Sive, de Motus Principio & Natura, et de Causa Communicationis Motuum ('On Motion: or The Principle and Nature of Motion and the Cause of the Communication of Motions'), a 1721 essay by George Berkeley
- De motu corporum in gyrum ('On the motion of bodies in an orbit'), the presumed title of a manuscript by Isaac Newton sent to Edmond Halley in November 1684
- Exercitatio Anatomica de Motu Cordis et Sanguinis in Animalibus ('An Anatomical Exercise on the Motion of the Heart and Blood in Living Beings'), or De motu cordis, a 1628 book published by William Harvey
- De Motu Antiquiora ('The Older Writings on Motion'), or simply De Motu, Galileo Galilei's early written work on motion, written between 1589 and 1592 but not published until 1687
- De motu animalium ('On the Motion of Animals'), a treatise about animal locomotion by Aristotle
- De motu animalium, by Giovanni Alfonso Borelli (1608–1679), an early work on biomechanics, relating animals to machines
- De motu animalium spontaneo, by Pierre Petit (1617–1687), opposing René Descartes and Cartesianism
