= Motus, LLC =

American software company

- Type: Private Company
- Industry: Software
- Founded: 2004; 22 years ago
- Founder: Gregg Darish
- Headquarters: Boston, Massachusetts, United States
- Services: Millage reimbursement, driver monitoring, mobile device monitoring, living cost analysis
- Owner: Thoma Bravo
- Number of employees: 450 (2017)
- Website: www.motus.com

Motus is an American workforce management company headquartered in Boston, Massachusetts, that offers vehicle reimbursement, fleet management and business intelligence solutions. This includes mileage reimbursement, BYO programs, Managed Mobility Services, and living cost intelligence.

Motus supplies the United States Internal Revenue Service (IRS) with data on business vehicle use to inform the business mileage reimbursement rate.

== History ==
Motus was founded in 2004 as Corporate Reimbursement Services, Inc. (CRS) by Gregg Darish, and changed its name to Motus in 2014.

Craig Powell joined the company in 2014 as President and CEO. He retired in January 2022 and went on to serve as an advisor to the Board of Directors.

In August 2014, Motus released an integration with American cloud computing company Salesforce.com to instantly associate business stops with accounts, contacts, and leads in the Salesforce customer relationship management (CRM) product.

In 2015, Motus announced an integration with American travel management company Concur Technologies to allow employees to submit mileage to Motus, calculate individual reimbursement amounts, and automatically create expense reports in Concur Expense for manager approval.

In September 2015, Motus released an integration with Oracle Corporation to instantly associate Motus administrative activities with Oracle customer relationship management (CRM) software.

In 2018, Motus was acquired by private equity and growth capital firm Thoma Bravo, LLC, and merged with Runzheimer, creating the leading provider of mileage reimbursement technologies serving the nation's most complex transportation companies. It also partnered with FleetCor Technologies, Inc, which provides fuel cards and workforce payment products and services.

Motus acquired the Danvers, Massachusetts-based mobile expense management firm Wireless Analytics in September 2019. A year later, in September 2020, the company acquired the Augusta, Georgia firm, Vision Wireless.

== See also ==
- Business mileage reimbursement rate
- Tax deduction
- Vehicle miles traveled tax
