= Exercitatio Anatomica de Motu Cordis et Sanguinis in Animalibus =

Best-known work of English physician William Harvey (1578-1657) published 1628

title page of Harvey's Exercitatio Anatomica de Motu Cordis et Sanguinis in Animalibus.

Exercitatio Anatomica de Motu Cordis et Sanguinis in Animalibus (Modern Latin for 'An Anatomical Exercise on the Motion of the Heart and Blood in Living Beings'), commonly shortened to De Motu Cordis, is the best-known work of royal physician William Harvey, which was first published in 1628 and established the circulation of blood throughout the body. It is a landmark in the history of physiology, with Harvey combining observations, experiments, measurements, and hypotheses in an extraordinary fashion to arrive at his doctrine. His work is a model of its kind and had an immediate and far-reaching influence on Harvey's contemporaries; Thomas Hobbes said that Harvey was the only modern author whose doctrines were taught in his lifetime.

In De Motu Cordis, Harvey investigated the effect of ligatures on blood flow. The book also argued that blood was pumped around the body in a "double circulation", where after being returned to the heart, it is recirculated in a closed system to the lungs and back to the heart, where it is returned to the main circulation.

== Synopsis ==
This work is a substantial contribution to cardiac physiology, for it introduces into biology the doctrine of circulation of the blood in the seventeenth century.

Papers both opposed and supported Harvey's discovery and description can be found to the thirteenth century, when the pulmonary circulation and gas exchange was proposed by Ibn Al-Nafis. Both long since proven theories are incomplete when studied separately but together form core knowledge of present-day cardiology. In 1553, Michael Servetus said that blood flows from the heart to the lungs, and that it there mixes with air to form the arterial blood which flows back to the heart. Between 1570 and 1590, Cesalpino suggested, in a controversy with Galenists, that the movement of blood was more like a circulation than an oscillation; but this view lacks clarity. In 1603, Hieronymus Fabricius ab Acquapendente published a work clearly describing the valves in the veins and showing that they hinder the flow of blood away from the heart.

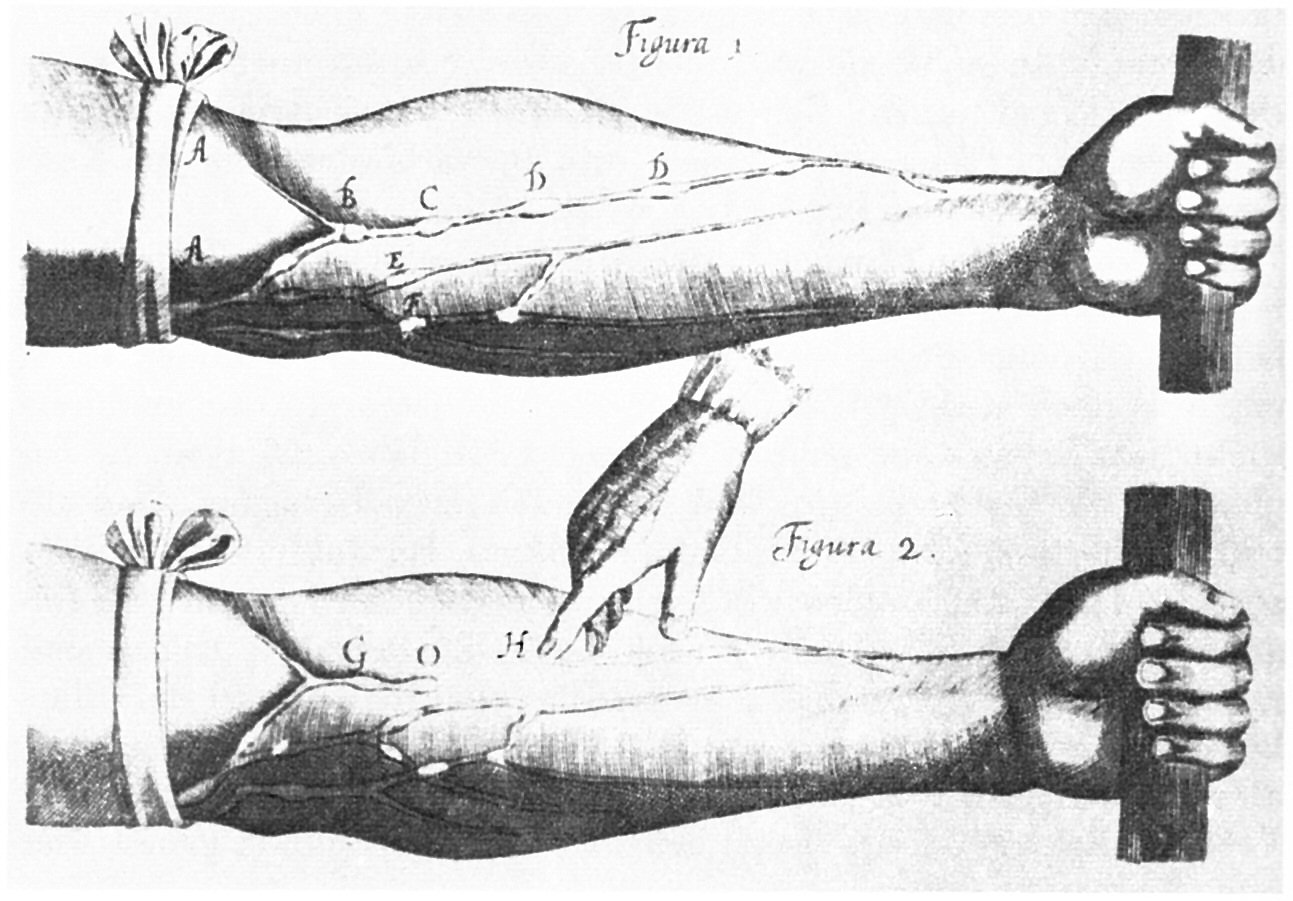
An experiment from Harvey's Exercitatio Anatomica de Motu Cordis et Sanguinis in Animalibus

In the early 1600s, Harvey studied arts and medicine at Padua, and made a careful study of the heart and the movement of blood. During his time at Padua, he furthered his anatomical education under Fabricius. After a little over two years at Padua, Harvey received his MD degree in April of 1602. By 1616, he was presenting in lectures his case for the circulation of the blood, but it was not until 1628 that he published it in his classic work, De Motu Cordis. This book is important both for the discovery of the complete circulation and for the experimental, quantitative and mechanistic methodology which Harvey introduced. He looked upon the heart, not as a mystical seat of the spirit and faculties, but as a pump analyzable along mechanical lines. He also measured the amount of blood which it sent out to the body. He observed that with each beat two ounces of blood leave the heart, so that with 72 beats per minute, the heart throws into the system 540 pounds of blood every hour. Where could all this blood come from? The answer seems to be that it is the same blood that is always returning. Moreover, the one-way valves in the heart, like those in the veins, indicate that, following the pulmonary circulation, the blood goes out to all parts of the body through the arteries and returns by way of the veins. The blood thus makes a complete closed circuit. As Harvey expressed it, "There must be a motion, as it were, in a circle."

There was, however, one stage in the circulation which Harvey was not able to see — that in which the veins and arteries lose themselves by subdivision into the tiny capillary vessels. It was in 1660, three years after Harvey's death, that Marcello Malpighi saw the blood moving in the capillaries of a frog's lung, and thus supplied the missing link in Harvey's proof of the circulation of the blood.

== In Media and Popular Culture ==
De Motu Cordis is mentioned by Viktor Frankenstein in Guillermo del Toro's 2025 film, Frankenstein.
