= Temotu =

Temotu may refer to:

- Temotu Province, a province of the Solomon Islands
- Temotu, Tuvalu, an islet of Vaitupu, Tuvalu
- Temotu, a village on Marakei, Kiribati
- Temotu, a village on Nonouti, Kiribati

== See also ==
- Temotu languages
