= Mõttus =

Estonian family name

Origin
- Region of origin: Estonia

Mõttus is an Estonian surname (meaning "capercaillie"), and may refer to:

- Jaan Mõttus (1891–1942), Estonian politician
- Alfred Julius Mõttus (1886–1942), Estonian politician
