= Michael Servetus =

16th-century Spanish theologian, physician, cartographer and Renaissance humanist

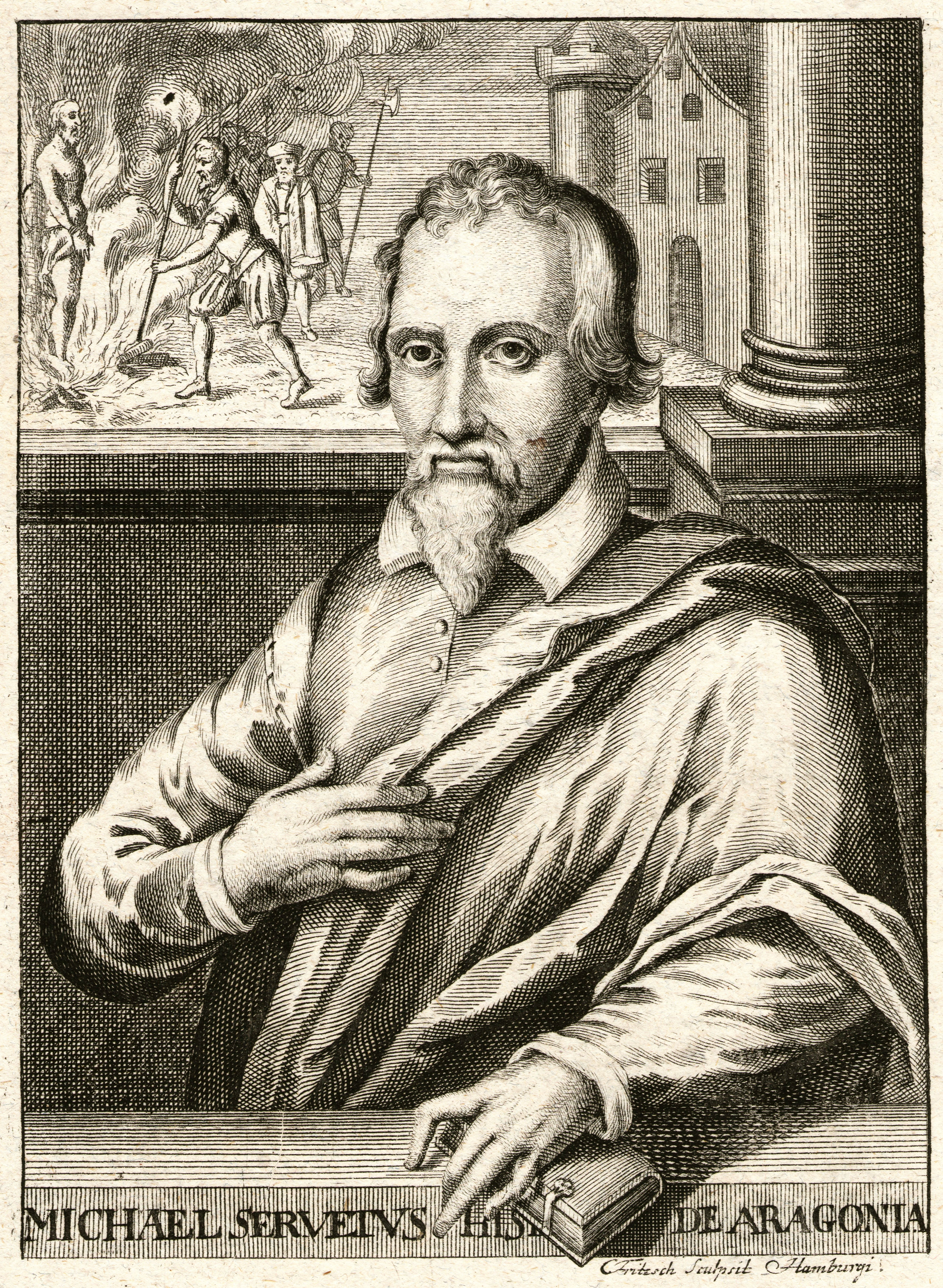
- Born: c. 1509-1511; possibly 29 September 1511; Villanueva de Sigena, Aragon, or Tudela, Navarre
- Died: 27 October 1553 (aged 42); Geneva, Republic of Geneva
- Education: University of Paris
- Title: Theologian, physician, editor, translator
- Theological work
- Era: Renaissance
- Tradition or movement: Renaissance humanism
- Main interests: Theology, medicine
- Notable ideas: Nontrinitarian Christology, pulmonary circulation

Michael Servetus (/sərˈviːtəs/; Spanish: Miguel Servet; French: Michel Servet; also known as Michel Servetus, Miguel de Villanueva, Revés, or Michel de Villeneuve; 29 September 1509 or 1511 – 27 October 1553) was a Spanish theologian, physician, cartographer, and Renaissance humanist. He was the first European to correctly describe the function of pulmonary circulation, as discussed in Christianismi Restitutio (1553). He was a polymath versed in many sciences: mathematics, astronomy and meteorology, geography, human anatomy, medicine and pharmacology, as well as jurisprudence, translation, poetry, and the scholarly study of the Bible in its original languages.

He is renowned in the history of several of these fields, particularly medicine. His work on the circulation of blood and his observations on pulmonary circulation were particularly important. He participated in the Protestant Reformation, and later rejected the doctrine of the Trinity and mainstream Catholic Christology. Biblical unitarians credit him with reviving this theological issue, originally associated with Arius more than a thousand years previously.

After being condemned by Catholic authorities in France after the publication of the Restitutio, he fled to Calvin's Geneva in 1553. He was denounced by John Calvin, a principal instigator of the Protestant Reformation, and burned at the stake for heresy by order of the city's governing council. The full culpability of Calvin in the execution has been the subject of historical debate.

== Life ==
=== Early life and education ===
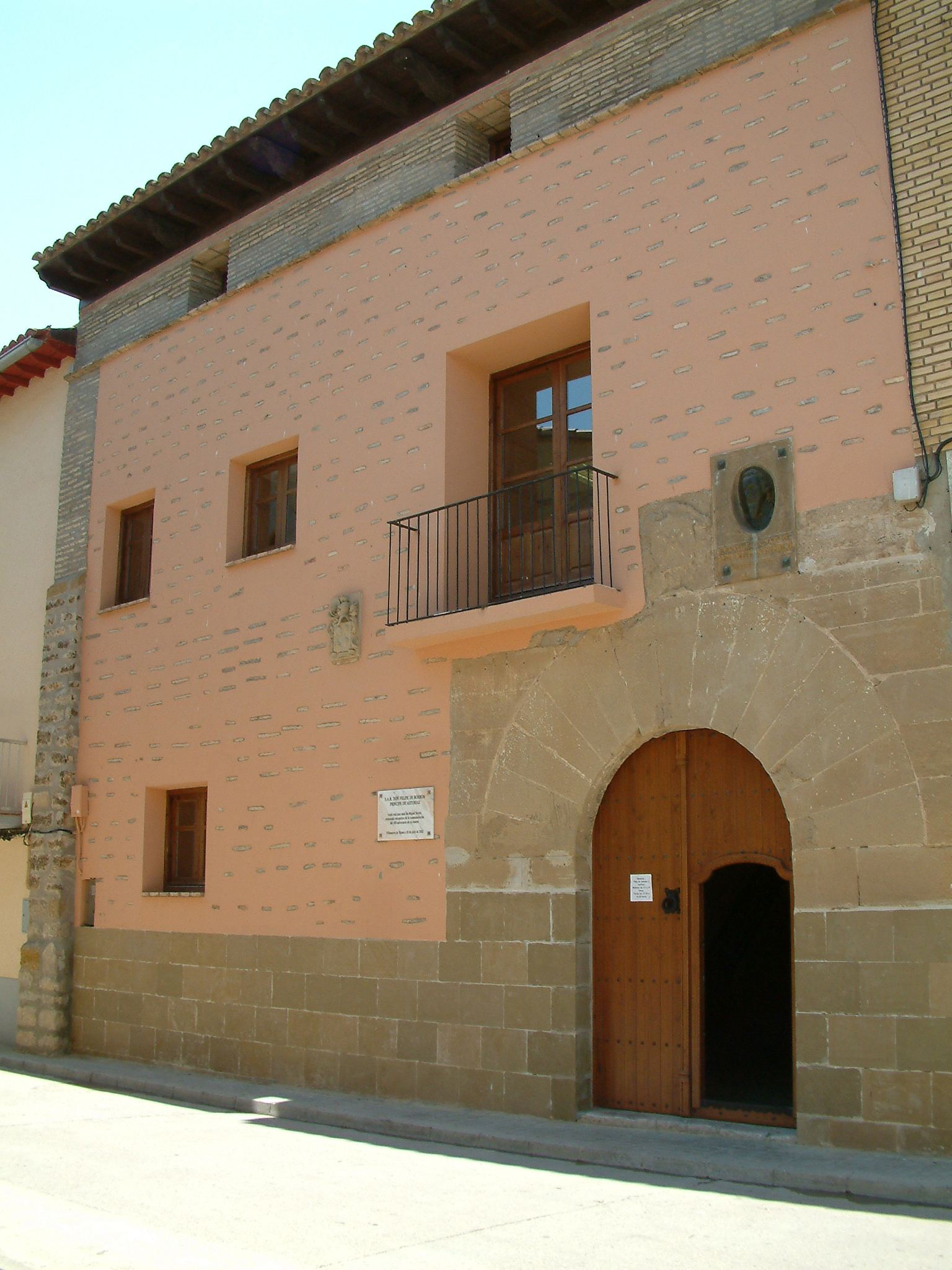
Headquarters of the Michael Servetus Institute and a research centre of Servetus' life and works in Villanueva de Sigena in Aragon, Spain

By tradition, Servetus was born in 1511 in Villanueva de Sigena in the Kingdom of Aragon, present-day Spain. Some sources give an earlier date based on Servetus' own occasional claim of having been born in 1509. The day of 29 September has been conventionally proposed for his birth as it is Saint Michael's day according to the Catholic calendar of saints, but there is no direct evidence supporting the date. However, in 2002 a paper published by Francisco Javier González Echeverría and María Teresa Ancín suggested that he was born in Tudela, Kingdom of Navarre. It has also been held that his true name was De Villanueva according to the letters of his French naturalization (Chamber des Comptes, Royal Chancellorship and Parlement of Grenoble) and the registry at the University of Paris.

The ancestors of his father came from the hamlet of Serveto, in the Aragonese Pyrenees. His father was a notary of Christian ancestors from the lower nobility (infanzón), who worked at the nearby Monastery of Santa Maria de Sigena. It was long believed that Servetus had just two brothers: Juan, who was a Catholic parish priest, and Pedro, who was a notary. But it has been recently documented that Servetus actually had two more brothers (Antón and Francisco) and at least three sisters (Catalina, Jeronima, and Juana). Although Servetus declared during his trial in Geneva that his parents were "Christians of ancient race", and that he never had any communication with Jews, his maternal line actually descended from the Zaportas (or Çaportas), a wealthy and socially relevant Converso family from the Barbastro and Monzón areas in Aragon. This was demonstrated by a notarial protocol published in 1999.

Servetus' family used a nickname, "Revés", according to an old tradition in rural Spain of using alternate names for families across generations. The origin of the Revés nickname may have been that a member of a (probably distinguished) family living in Villanueva with the surname Revés established blood ties with the Servet family, thus uniting both family names for the next generations.

=== Education ===
Servetus attended the Grammar Studium in Sariñena, Aragón, near Villanueva de Sijena, under master Domingo Manobel until 1520. Over the terms 1520–21 and 1522–23, Michael Servetus was a student of the Liberal Arts in the primitive University of Zaragoza, a Studium Generale of Arts. The Studium was ruled by the Archbishop of Saragossa, the Rector, the High Master ("Maestro Mayor"), and four "Masters of Arts", which resembled Art professors in the Arts Faculties of other primitive universities.

Servetus studied under High Master Gaspar Lax, and masters Exerich, Ansias, and Miranda. During those years this education center had been significantly influenced by Erasmus's ideas, which included a humanistic approach to biblical theology. Ansias and Miranda died soon, and two new professors were appointed: Juan Lorenzo Carnicer and Villalpando. In 1523 he got his BA and next year his MA. From course 1525/1526 ahead, Servetus became one of the four Masters of Arts in the Studium, and for unknown reasons, he traveled to Salamanca in February 1527. But on 28 March 1527, also for unknown reasons, master Michael Servetus had a brawl with High Master (and uncle) Gaspard Lax, and this probably was the cause of his expulsion from the Studium, and his exile from Spain for the Studium of Toulouse, trying to avoid the strong influence of Gaspar Lax in any Spanish Studium Generale.

Near 1527 Servetus attended the University of Toulouse where he studied law. Servetus could have had access to forbidden religious books, some of them maybe Protestant, while he was studying in this city.

=== Career ===
In 1530 Servetus joined the retinue of Emperor Charles V as page or secretary to the emperor's confessor, Juan de Quintana. Servetus travelled through Italy and Germany and attended Charles' coronation as Holy Roman Emperor in Bologna. He was outraged by the pomp and luxury displayed by the Pope and his retinue, and so decided to follow the path of reformation. It is not known when Servetus left the imperial entourage, but in October 1530 he visited Johannes Oecolampadius in Basel, staying there for about ten months, probably supporting himself as a proofreader for a local printer. By this time, he was already spreading his theological beliefs. In May 1531 he met Martin Bucer and Wolfgang Fabricius Capito in Strasbourg.

Two months later, in July 1531, Servetus published De Trinitatis Erroribus (On the Errors of the Trinity). The next year he published the work Dialogorum de Trinitate (Dialogues on the Trinity) and the supplementary work De Iustitia Regni Christi (On the Justice of Christ's Reign) in the same volume. After the persecution of the Inquisition, Servetus assumed the name "Michel de Villeneuve" while he was staying in France. He studied at the Collège de Calvi in Paris in 1533. Servetus also published the first French edition of Ptolemy's Geography. He dedicated his first edition of Ptolemy and his edition of the Bible to his patron Hugues de la Porte. While in Lyon, Symphorien Champier, a medical humanist, had been his patron. Servetus wrote a pharmacological treatise in defence of Champier against Leonhart Fuchs In Leonardum Fucsium Apologia (Apology against Leonard Fuchs). Working also as a proofreader, he published several more books, which dealt with medicine and pharmacology (such as his Syruporum universia ratio (Complete Explanation of the Syrups)), for which he gained fame.

After an interval, Servetus returned to Paris to study medicine in 1536. In Paris, his teachers included Jacobus Sylvius, Jean Fernel, and Johann Winter von Andernach, who hailed him with Andrea Vesalius as his most able assistant in dissections. During these years, he wrote his Manuscript of the Complutense, an unpublished compendium of his medical ideas. Servetus taught mathematics and astrology while he studied medicine. He predicted an occultation of Mars by the Moon, which along with his teaching, generated much envy among the medicine teachers. His teaching classes were suspended by the Dean of the Faculty of Medicine, Jean Tagault, and Servetus wrote his Apologetic Discourse of Michel de Villeneuve in Favour of Astrology and against a Certain Physician against him. Tagault later argued for the death penalty in the judgment of the University of Paris against Servetus, who was accused of teaching De Divinatione by Cicero. Finally, the sentence was reduced to the withdrawal of this edition. As a result of the risks and difficulties of studying medicine at Paris, Servetus decided to go to Montpellier to finish his medical studies, maybe thanks to his teacher Sylvius who did exactly the same as a student. There Servetus became a Doctor of Medicine in 1539. After that he lived at Charlieu. A jealous physician ambushed and tried to kill Servetus, but Servetus defended himself and injured one of the attackers in a sword fight. He was in prison for several days because of this incident.

=== Working at Vienne ===
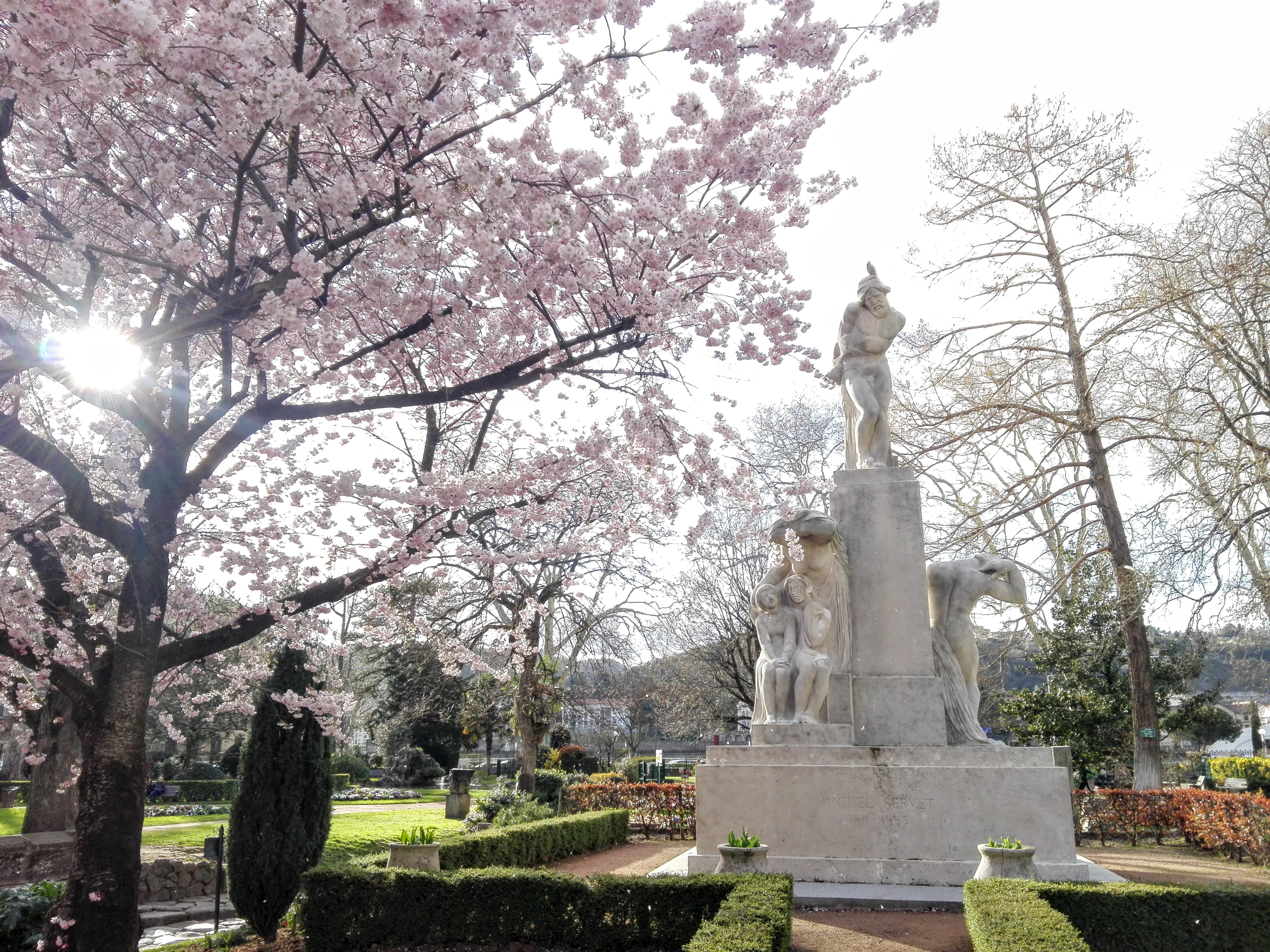
Monument to Michel Servet (1908–1911), Joseph Bernard, Vienne city park.

After his studies in medicine, Servetus started a medical practice. He became the personal physician to Pierre Palmier, Archbishop of Vienne and was the physician to Guy de Maugiron, the lieutenant governor of Dauphiné. Thanks to the printer Jean Frellon II, acquaintance of John Calvin and friend of Michel, Servetus and Calvin began to correspond. Calvin used the pseudonym "Charles d'Espeville". Servetus also became a French citizen, using his "De Villeneuve" persona, by the Royal Process (1548–1549) of French Naturalization, issued by Henry II of France.

In 1553 Michael Servetus published another religious work with further anti-trinitarian views entitled Christianismi Restitutio (The Restoration of Christianity), a work that sharply rejected the idea of predestination as the idea that God condemned souls to Hell regardless of worth or merit. God, insisted Servetus, condemns no one who does not condemn himself through thought, word, or deed. This work also includes the first published description of the pulmonary circulation in Europe, though it's thought to be based on work by 13th century Syrian polymath ibn al-Nafis.

Servetus had sent an early version of his book to Calvin. To Calvin, who had published his summary of Christian doctrine Institutio Christianae Religionis (Institutes of the Christian Religion) in 1536, Servetus' latest book was an attack on historical Nicene Christian doctrine and a misinterpretation of the biblical canon. Calvin sent a copy of his own book as his reply. Servetus promptly returned it, thoroughly annotated with critical observations. Calvin wrote to Servetus, "I neither hate you nor despise you; nor do I wish to persecute you; but I would be as hard as iron when I behold you insulting sound doctrine with so great audacity". In time, their correspondence grew more heated until Calvin ended it. Servetus sent Calvin several more letters, to which Calvin took offense. Thus, Calvin's frustrations with Servetus seem to have been based mainly on Servetus's criticisms of Calvinist doctrine, but also on his tone, which Calvin considered inappropriate. Calvin revealed these frustrations with Servetus when writing to his friend William Farel on 13 February 1546:

Servetus has just sent me a long volume of his ravings. If I consent he will come here, but I will not give my word; for if he comes here, if my authority is worth anything, I will never permit him to depart alive (Latin: Si venerit, modo valeat mea autoritas, vivum exire nunquam patiar).

=== Imprisonment and execution ===
On 16 February 1553, Michael Servetus while in Vienne, France, was denounced as a heretic by Guillaume de Trie (a rich merchant who had taken refuge in Geneva and who was a good friend of Calvin) in a letter sent to a cousin, Antoine Arneys, who was living in Lyon. On behalf of the French inquisitor Matthieu Ory, Michael Servetus and Balthasard Arnollet, the printer of Christianismi Restitutio, were questioned, but they denied all charges and were released for lack of evidence. Ory asked Arneys to write back to De Trie demanding proof. On 26 March 1553, the letters sent by Michael to Calvin and some manuscript pages of Christianismi Restitutio were forwarded to Lyon by De Trie. On 4 April 1553, Servetus was arrested by Roman Catholic authorities and imprisoned in Vienne. He escaped from prison three days later. On 17 June, he was convicted of heresy, "thanks to the 17 letters sent by John Calvin, preacher in Geneva" and sentenced to be burned with his books. In his absence, he and his books were burned in effigy (blank paper for the books).

Meaning to flee to Italy, Servetus inexplicably stopped in Geneva, where Calvin and his Reformers had denounced him. On 13 August, he attended a sermon by Calvin at Geneva. He was arrested after the service and again imprisoned, and all his property was confiscated. Servetus claimed during this proceeding that he had been arrested at an inn at Geneva. French inquisitors asked that he be extradited to them for execution, but Calvin wanted to show that he was as firm in defense of Christian orthodoxy as his opponents, and determined "to push the condemnation of Servetus with all the means at his command". Calvin's health was one possible reason why he did not personally appear against Servetus. The laws regulating criminal actions in Geneva required that in certain grave cases the complainant himself should be incarcerated pending the trial. Calvin's health, and his importance in the administration of the state, rendered a prolonged absence from the public life of Geneva impracticable. Therefore Nicholas de la Fontaine had the more active role in Servetus's prosecution and the listing of the points that condemned him. (Nicholas de la Fontaine was a refugee in Geneva and entered the service of Calvin, by whom he was employed as secretary.) Nevertheless, Calvin is regarded as the author of the prosecution.

At his trial, Servetus was condemned on two counts for spreading and preaching Nontrinitarianism, specifically, Modalistic Monarchianism (or Sabellianism) and anti-paedobaptism (anti-infant baptism). Of paedobaptism Servetus had said, "It is an invention of the devil, an infernal falsity for the destruction of all Christianity." In the case, the procureur général (chief public prosecutor) added some curious-sounding accusations in the form of inquiries—the most odd-sounding perhaps being, "whether he has married, and if he answers that he has not, he shall be asked why, in consideration of his age, he could refrain so long from marriage." To this oblique imputation about his sexuality, Servetus replied that rupture (inguinal hernia) had long since made him incapable of that particular sin. Another question was "whether he did not know that his doctrine was pernicious, considering that he favours Jews and Turks, by making excuses for them, and if he has not studied the Koran in order to disprove and controvert the doctrine and religion that the Christian churches hold, together with other profane books, from which people ought to abstain in matters of religion, according to the doctrine of St. Paul."

Calvin believed that Servetus deserved death because of what Calvin termed "execrable blasphemies". Calvin expressed these sentiments in a letter to Farel, written about a week after Servetus' arrest, in which he also mentioned an exchange with Servetus. Calvin wrote:

...after he [Servetus] had been recognized, I thought he should be detained. My friend Nicolas summoned him on a capital charge, offering himself as a security according to the lex talionis. On the following day he adduced against him forty written charges. He at first sought to evade them. Accordingly we were summoned. He impudently reviled me, just as if he regarded me as obnoxious to him. I answered him as he deserved... of the man’s effrontery I will say nothing; but such was his madness that he did not hesitate to say that devils possessed divinity; yea, that many gods were in individual devils, inasmuch as a deity had been substantially communicated to those equally with wood and stone. I hope that sentence of death will at least be passed on him; but I desired that the severity of the punishment be mitigated.

As Servetus was not a citizen of Geneva at worst he could legally be banished. The government, in an attempt to find some plausible excuse to disregard this legal reality, consulted the Swiss Reformed cantons of Zürich, Bern, Basel and Schaffhausen. They universally favoured his condemnation and the suppression of his doctrine, but without saying how either should be accomplished. Martin Luther had also condemned his writings in strong terms. Servetus and Philip Melanchthon had strongly hostile views of each other. The party called the "Libertines", who were generally opposed to anything and everything that Calvin supported, were in this case strongly in favour of the execution of Servetus at the stake, while Calvin urged that he be beheaded. In fact, the council that condemned Servetus was presided over by Ami Perrin (a Libertine) who ultimately on 24 October sentenced Servetus to death by burning for denying the Trinity and infant baptism. Calvin and other ministers asked that he be beheaded instead of burned, knowing that burning at the stake was the only legal recourse. This plea was refused, and on 27 October, Servetus was burnt alive atop a pyre of his own books at the Plateau of Champel at the edge of Geneva. Historians record his last words as: "Jesus, Son of the Eternal God, have mercy on me."

== Legacy ==
Sebastian Castellio and countless others denounced this execution and became harsh critics of Calvin because of the whole affair.

Some other anti-trinitarian thinkers began to be more cautious in expressing their views: Martin Cellarius, Lelio Sozzini and others either ceased writing or wrote only in private. The fact that Servetus was dead meant that his writings could be distributed more widely, though others such as Giorgio Biandrata developed them in their own names.

The writings of Servetus influenced the beginnings of the Unitarian movement in Poland and Transylvania. Peter Gonesius's advocacy of Servetus' views led to the separation of the Polish brethren from the Calvinist Reformed Church in Poland, and laid the foundations for the Socinian movement which fostered the early Unitarians in England like John Biddle (1615–1662).

== Theology ==
In his first two books (De trinitatis erroribus, and Dialogues on the Trinity, plus the supplementary De Iustitia Regni Christi), Servetus rejected the classical conception of the Trinity, stating that it was not based on the Bible. He argued that it arose from the teachings of Greek philosophers and advocated a return to the simplicity of the Gospels and the teachings of the early Church Fathers that he believed predated the development of Nicene Trinitarianism. Servetus hoped that the dismissal of the trinitarian dogma would make Christianity more appealing to believers in Judaism and Islam, which had preserved the unity of God in their teachings. According to Servetus, trinitarians had turned Christianity into a form of "tritheism", or belief in three gods. Servetus affirmed that the divine Logos—the manifestation of God and not a separate divine Person—was incarnated as a human being (Jesus) when God's spirit came into the womb of the Virgin Mary. Only from the moment of conception was the Son (i.e., the Logos) actually generated. Therefore, though the Logos he was formed from was eternal, the Son was not himself eternal. For this reason, Servetus always rejected calling Jesus the "eternal Son of God" but rather called him "the Son of the eternal God."

In describing Servetus's view of the Logos, Andrew Dibb explained: "In 'Genesis' God reveals himself as the creator. In 'John' he reveals that he created by means of the Word, or Logos. Finally, also in 'John', he shows that this Logos became flesh and 'dwelt among us'. Creation took place by the spoken word, for God said "Let there be ..." The spoken word of Genesis, the Logos of John, and the Christ, are all one and the same."

In his Treatise Concerning the Divine Trinity, Servetus taught that the Logos was the reflection of the Christ—"That reflection of Christ was 'the Word with God" that consisted of God himself, shining brightly in Heaven, "and it was God Himself"—and that "the Word was the very essence of God or the manifestation of God's essence, and there was in God no other substance or hypostasis than His Word, in a bright cloud where God then seemed to subsist. And in that very spot the face and personality of Christ shone bright."

Unitarian scholar Earl Morse Wilbur states: "Servetus' Errors of the Trinity is hardly heretical in intent, rather is suffused with passionate earnestness, warm piety, an ardent reverence for Scripture, and a love for Christ so mystical and overpowering that [he] can hardly find words to express it ... Servetus asserted that the Father, Son and Holy Spirit were dispositions of God, and not separate and distinct beings." Wilbur promotes the idea that Servetus was a modalist.

Servetus states his view clearly in the preamble to Restoration of Christianity (1553): "There is nothing greater, reader, than to recognize that God has been manifested as substance, and that His divine nature has been truly communicated. We shall clearly apprehend the manifestation of God through the Word and his communication through the Spirit, both of them substantially in Christ alone."

His theology, though original in some respects, has often been compared to Adoptionism, Arianism, and Sabellianism, all of which trinitarians rejected in favour of the belief that God exists eternally in three distinct persons. Nevertheless, Servetus rejected the above theologies in his books. Adoptionism, because it denied Jesus's divinity; Arianism, because it multiplied the hypostases and established a rank; and Sabellianism, because it seemingly confused the Father with the Son, though Servetus seems to have denied or diminished the distinctions between the Persons of the Godhead, rejecting the Trinitarian understanding of one God in three Persons.

The incomprehensible God is known through Christ, by faith, rather than by philosophical speculations. He manifests God to us, being the expression of His very being, and through him alone, God can be known. The scriptures reveal Him to those who have faith; and thus we come to know the Holy Spirit as the Divine impulse within us.

Under severe pressure from Catholics and Protestants alike, Servetus clarified this explanation in his second book—Dialogues (1532)—to show the Logos as coterminous with Jesus. He was nevertheless accused of heresy because of his insistence on denying the dogma of the Trinity and the distinctions between the three divine Persons in one God.

== Legacy ==
=== Theology ===
Because of his rejection of the Trinity and eventual execution by burning for heresy, Unitarians often regard Servetus as the first (modern) Unitarian martyr—though he was a Unitarian in neither the 17th-century sense of the term nor the contemporary sense. Sharply critical though he was of the orthodox formulation of the Trinity, Servetus is better described as a highly unorthodox trinitarian.

Aspects of his thinking—his critique of existing trinitarian theology, his devaluation of the doctrine of original sin, and his examination of Biblical proof-texts—did influence those who later inspired or founded unitarian churches in Poland and Transylvania.

Other nontrinitarian groups, such as Jehovah's Witnesses, and the Oneness Pentecostals, also claim Servetus held similar nontrinitarian views as theirs. Oneness Pentecostalism particularly identifies with Servetus's teaching on the divinity of Jesus and his insistence on the oneness of God, rather than a Trinity of three distinct persons: "And because His Spirit was wholly God He is called God, just as from His flesh He is called man."

Oneness Pentecostal scholar David K. Bernard has written the following regarding the theology of Michael Servetus: "... some historians consider him to be a motivating force for the development of Unitarianism. However, he definitely was not Unitarian, for he acknowledged Jesus as God."

Swedenborg wrote a systematic theology that had many similarities to the theology of Servetus.

Servetus also declared baptism of babies "diabolical". He denied the concept of original sin and also denied the Holy Trinity. He compares it to the three-headed Cerberus from the ancient Greek myths. Other beliefs he had were that Jesus was a human who had become divine rather than being God's eternal son.

=== Freedom of conscience ===
The widespread aversion to the death of Servetus has been interpreted as a significant moment in the emergence of the idea of religious tolerance in Europe. This principle has become increasingly important to modern Unitarian Universalists, surpassing the significance of antitrinitarianism. The Spanish scholar on Servetus' work, Ángel Alcalá, identified the radical search for truth and the right for freedom of conscience as Servetus' main legacies, rather than his theology. The Polish-American scholar Marian Hillar has studied the evolution of freedom of conscience, from Servetus and the Polish Socinians, to John Locke, and to Thomas Jefferson and the American Declaration of Independence. According to Hillar: "Historically speaking, Servetus died so that freedom of conscience could become a civil right in modern society."

=== Science ===
Servetus was the first European to describe the function of pulmonary circulation, though his achievement was not widely recognized at the time for a few reasons. One was that the description appeared in a theological treatise, Christianismi Restitutio, not in a book on medicine. However, the sections in which he refers to anatomy and medicines demonstrate an amazing understanding of the body and treatments. Most copies of the book were burned shortly after its publication in 1553 because of the persecution of Servetus by religious authorities. Three copies survived, but these remained hidden for decades. In passage V, Servetus recounts his discovery that the blood of the pulmonary circulation flows from the heart to the lungs (rather than air in the lungs flowing to the heart as had been thought). His discovery was based on the colour of the blood, the size and location of the different ventricles, and the fact that the pulmonary vein was extremely large, which suggested that it performed intensive and transcendent exchange. However, Servetus does not only deal with cardiology. In the same passage, from pages 169 to 178, he also refers to the brain, the cerebellum, the meninges, the nerves, the eye, the tympanum, the rete mirabile, etc., demonstrating a great knowledge of anatomy. In some other sections of this work he also talks of medical products.

Servetus also contributed enormously to medicine with other published works specifically related to the field, such as his Complete Explanation of Syrups and his study on syphilis in his Apology against Leonhart Fuchs, among others.

=== References in literature ===
- Austrian author Stefan Zweig features Servetus in The Right to Heresy: Castellio against Calvin, 1936 (original title Castellio gegen Calvin oder Ein Gewissen gegen die Gewalt)
- Canadian dramatist Robert Lalonde wrote Vesalius and Servetus, a 2008 play on Servetus.
- Roland Herbert Bainton: Michael Servet. 1511–1553. Mohn, Gütersloh 1960
- Rosemarie Schuder: Serveto vor Pilatus. Rütten & Loening, Berlin 1982
- Antonio Orejudo: Feuertäufer. Knaus, München 2005, ISBN 3-8135-0266-X (Roman, Spanish original title: Reconstrucción.)
- Vincent Schmidt: Michel Servet. Du bûcher à la liberté de conscience, Les Éditions de Paris, Collection Protestante, Paris 2009 ISBN 978-2-84621-118-5
- Albert J. Welti: Servet in Genf. Genf, 1931
- Wilhelm Knappich: Geschichte der Astrologie. Veröffentlicht von Vittorio Klostermann, 1998, ISBN 3-465-02984-4, ISBN 978-3-465-02984-7
- Friedrich Trechsel: Michael Servet und seine Vorgänger. Nach Quellen und Urkunden geschichtlich Dargestellt. Universitätsbuchhandlung Karl Winter, Heidelberg 1839 (Reprint durch: Nabu Press, 2010, ISBN 978-1-142-32980-8)
- Hans-Jürgen Goertz: Religiöse Bewegungen in der Frühen Neuzeit Oldenbourg, München 1992, ISBN 3-486-55759-9
- Henri Tollin: Die Entdeckung des Blutkreislaufs durch Michael Servet, 1511–1553, Nabu Public Domain Reprints
- Henri Tollin: Charakterbild Michael Servet´s, Nabu Public Domain Reprints
- Henri Tollin: Das Lehrsystem Michael Servet´s Volume 1, Nabu Public Domain Reprints
- Henri Tollin: Das Lehrsystem Michael Servet´s Volume 2, Nabu Public Domain Reprints
- Henri Tollin: Michaelis Villanovani (Serveti) in quendam medicum apologetica disceptatio pro astrologia: Nach dem einzig vorhandenen echten Pariser Exemplare, mit einer Einleitung und Anmerkungen. Mecklenburg −1880
- Carlos Gilly: Miguel Servet in Basel; Alfonsus Lyncurius und Pseudo-Servet. In: Ders.: Spanien und der Basler Buchdruck bis 1600. Helbing & Lichtenhahhn, Basel und Frankfurt a.M. 1985, pp. 277–298; 298–326. (PDF; 64,1 MiB )
- M. Hillar: "Poland's Contribution to the Reformation: Socinians/Polish Brethren and Their Ideas on the Religious Freedom," The Polish Review, Vol. XXXVIII, No. 4, pp. 447–468, 1993.
- M. Hillar, "From the Polish Socinians to the American Constitution," in A Journal from the Radical Reformation. A Testimony to Biblical Unitarianism, Vol. 4, No. 3, pp. 22–57, 1994.
- José Luis Corral: El médico hereje, Barcelona: Editorial Planeta, S.A., 2013 ISBN 978-84-08-11990-6. A novel (in Spanish) narrating the publication of Christianismi Restitutio, Servetus' trial by the Inquisition of Vienne, his escape to Geneva, and his disputes with John Calvin and subsequent burning at the stake by the Calvinists.

=== Honours ===
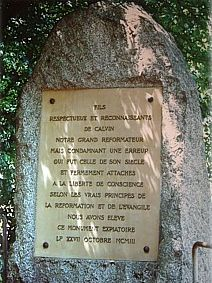
Monument to Michael Servetus, Champel, Switzerland

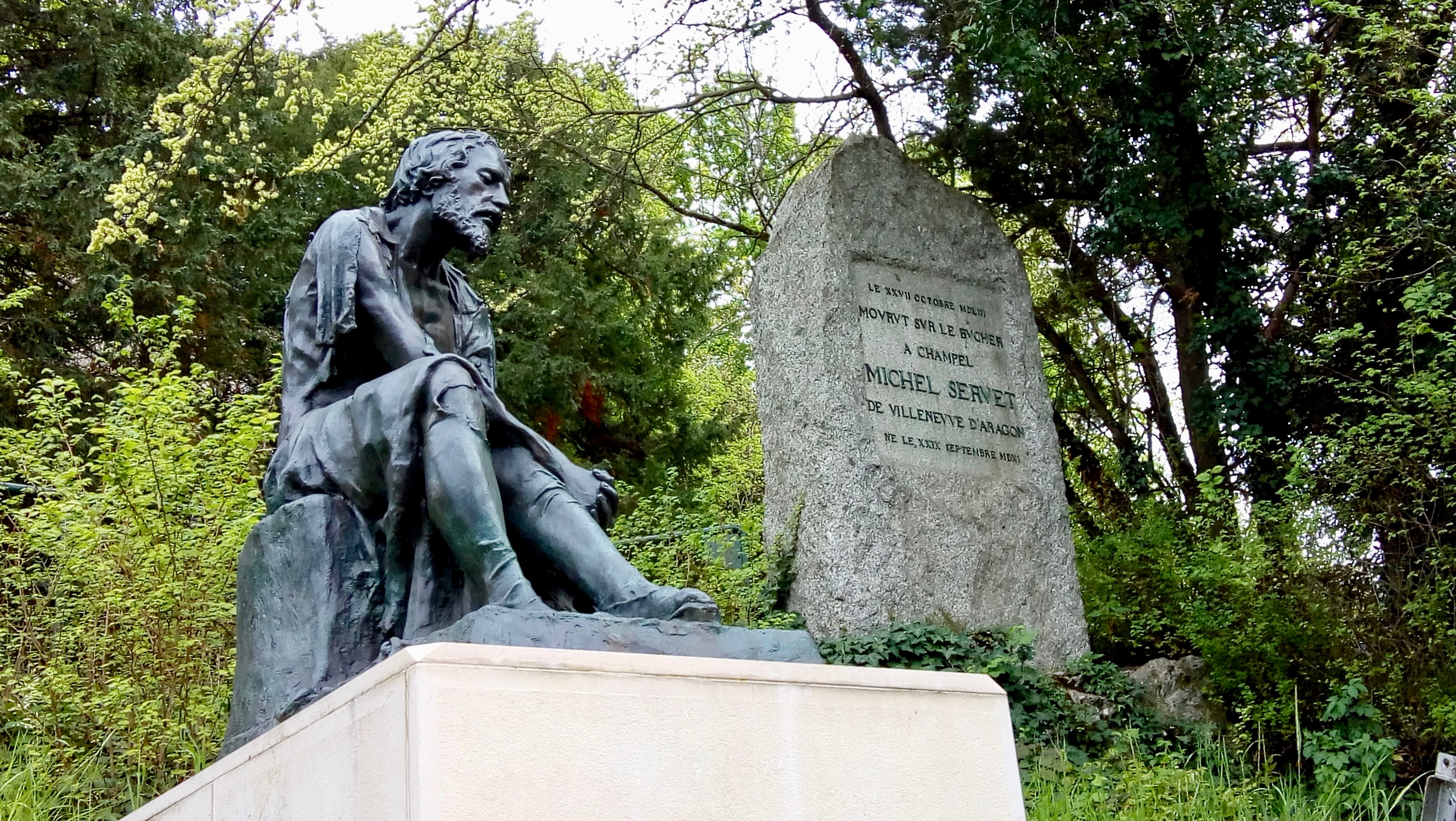
Monument to Michael Servetus in Geneva, Switzerland, in 2019

==== Geneva ====
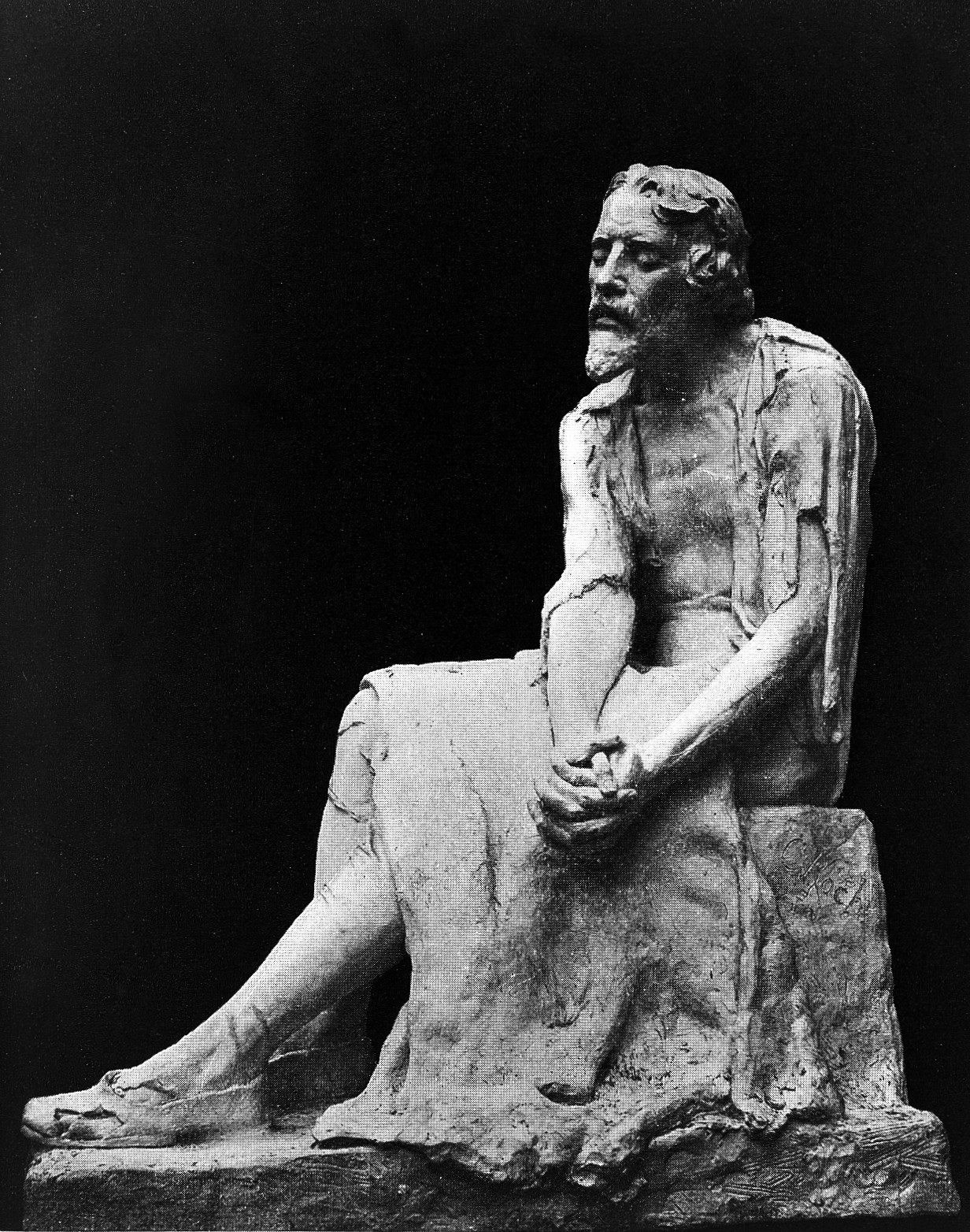
Michael Servetus in prison, by Clotilde Roch. Monument in Annemasse, France.

In Geneva, remembering Servetus was still a controversial issue 350 years after his execution. In 1903, supporters of Servetus formed a committee to erect a monument in his honour. The group was led by a French senator Auguste Dide, the author of a book on heretics and revolutionaries published in 1887. The committee commissioned a local sculptor named Clotilde Roch to create a statue showing a suffering Servetus. The work was three years in the making and finished in 1907. However, by then, supporters of Calvin in Geneva, having heard about the project, had already erected a simple stele in memory of Servetus in 1903, the main text of which served more as an apologetic for Calvin:

Duteous and grateful followers of Calvin our great Reformer, yet condemning an error which was that of his age, and strongly attached to liberty of conscience according to the true principles of his Reformation and gospel, we have erected this expiatory monument. Oct. 27, 1903

About the same time, a short street close by the stele was named after him.

The city council then rejected the request of the committee to erect the completed statue because there was already a monument to Servetus. The committee then offered the statue to the neighbouring French town of Annemasse, which in 1908 placed it in front of the city hall with the following inscriptions:

"The arrest of Servetus in Geneva, where he did neither publish nor dogmatize, hence he was not subject to its laws, has to be considered as a barbaric act and an insult to the Right of Nations". Voltaire

"I beg you, shorten please these deliberations. It is clear that Calvin for his pleasure wishes to make me rot in this prison. The lice eat me alive. My clothes are torn and I have nothing for a change, nor shirt, only a worn out vest". Servetus, 1553

In 1942, the Vichy Government took down the statue, as it was a celebration of freedom of conscience, and melted it. In 1960, having found the original molds, Annemasse had it recast and returned the statue to its previous place.

Finally, on 3 October 2011, Geneva erected a copy of the statue which it had rejected over 100 years before. It was cast in Aragon from the molds of Clotilde Roch's original statue. Rémy Pagani, former mayor of Geneva, inaugurated the statue. He previously had described Servetus as "the dissident of dissidence." Representatives from the Roman Catholic Church in Geneva and the Director of Geneva's International Museum of the Reformation attended the ceremony. A Geneva newspaper noted the absence of officials from the National Protestant Church of Geneva, the church of John Calvin.

==== Aragon ====
In 1984, the Zaragoza public hospital changed its name from José Antonio to Miguel Servet. Since 1999, this hospital has been known as the Hospital Universitario Miguel Servet, in recognition of its association with Servetus' own University of Zaragoza

== Works ==
Only the dates of the first editions are included.

- 1531 On the Errors of the Trinity. De Trinitatis Erroribus. Haguenau printed by Hans Setzer. Without imprint mark or mark of printer, nor the city in which it was printed. Signed as Michael Servete alias Revés, from Aragon, Spanish. Written in Latin, it also includes words in Greek and in Hebrew in the body of the text whenever he wanted to stress the original meaning of a word from Scripture.
- 1532 Dialogues on the Trinity. Dialogorum de Trinitate libri duo. Haguenau, printed by Hans Setzer. Without imprint mark or mark of printer, nor the city where it was printed. Signed as Michael Serveto alias Revés, from Aragon, Spanish.
- 1535 Geography of Claudius Ptolemy. Claudii Ptolemaeii Alexandrinii Geographicae enarrationis libri octo. Lyon, Trechsel. Signed as Michel de Villeneuve. Servetus dedicated this work to Hugues de la Porte. The second edition was dedicated to Pierre Palmier. Michel de Villeneuve states that the basis of his edition comes from the work of Bilibald Pirkheimer, who translated this work from Greek to Latin, but Michel also affirms that he also compared it to the primitive Greek texts. The 19th-century expert in Servetus, Henri Tollin (1833–1902), considered him to be "the father of comparative geography" due to the extension of his notes and commentaries.
- 1536 The Apology against Leonard Fuchs. In Leonardum Fucsium Apologia. Lyon, printed by Gilles Hugetan, with Parisian prologue. Signed as Michel de Villeneuve. The physician Leonhart Fuchs and a friend of Michael Servetus, Symphorien Champier, got involved in an argument via written works, on their different Lutheran and Catholic beliefs. Servetus defends his friend in the first parts of the work. In the second part he talks of a medical plant and its properties. In the last part he writes on different topics, such as the defense of a pupil attacked by a teacher, and the origin of syphilis.
- 1537 Complete Explanation of the Syrups. Syruporum universia ratio. Paris, printed by Simon de Colines. Signed as Michael de Villeneuve. This work consists of a prologue "The Use of Syrups", and 5 chapters: I "What the concoction is and why it is unique and not multiple", II "What the things that must be known are", III "That the concoction is always..", IV "Exposition of the aphorisms of Hippocrates" and V "On the composition of syrups". Michel de Villeneuve refers to experiences of using the treatments, and to pharmaceutical treatises and terms more deeply described in his later pharmacopeia Enquiridion or Dispensarium. Michel mentions two of his teachers, Sylvius and Andernach, but above all, Galen. This work had a strong impact in those times.
- 1538 Apologetic discourse of Michel de Villeneuve in favour of Astrology and against a certain physician. Michaelis Villanovani in quedam medicum apologetica disceptatio pro Astrologia. Paris, unknown printer. Servetus denounces Jean Tagault, Dean of the Faculty of Medicine of Paris, for attacking astrology, while many great thinkers and physicians praised it. He lists reasonings of Plato, Aristotle, Hippocrates and Galen, how the stars are related to some aspects of a patient's health, and how a good physician can predict effects by them: the effect of the moon and sun on the sea, the winds and rains, the period of women, the speed of the decomposition of the corpses of beasts, etc.
- 1542 Holy Bible according to the translation of Santes Pagnino. Biblia sacra ex Santes Pagnini tralation, hebraist. Lyon, edited by Delaporte and printed by Trechsel. The name Michel de Villeneuve appears in the prologue, the last time this name would appear in any of his works.
- 1542 Biblia sacra ex postremis doctorum (octavo). Vienne in Dauphiné, edited by Delaporte and printed by Trechsel. Anonymous.
- 1545 Holy Bible with commentaries. Biblia Sacra cum Glossis. Lyon, printed by Trechsel and Vincent. Called "Ghost Bible" by scholars who denied its existence. There is an anonymous work from this year that was edited in accordance with the contract that Miguel de Villeneuve made with the Company of Booksellers in 1540. The work consists of 7 volumes (6 volumes and an index) illustrated by Hans Holbein. This research was carried out by the scholar Julien Baudrier in the sixties. Recently scholar González Echeverría has graphically proved the existence of this work, and demonstrating that contrary to what experts Barón and Hillard thought, this work is also anonymous.
- "Manuscript of Paris" (c. 1546). This document is a draft of the Christianismi Restitutio. Written in Latin, it includes a few quotes in Greek and Hebrew. This work has paleographically the same handwriting as the "Manuscript of the Complutense".
- 1553 The Restoration of Christianity. Cristianismi Restitutio. Vienne, printed by Baltasar Arnoullet. Without imprint mark or mark of printer, nor the city in which it was printed. Signed as M.S.V. at the colophon though "Servetus" name is mentioned inside, in a fictional dialog. Servetus uses Biblical quotes in Greek and in Hebrew on its cover and in the body of the text whenever he wanted to stress the original meaning of a word from Scripture.

=== Servetus's anonymous editions ===
In 1553, Lyonese printer Jean Frellon confessed to the French Inquisition that Michael Servetus had been working at his print shop, and had translated for him, among other works, several Latin grammar treatises to Spanish, and a "somme espagnole". New studies reveal Servetus as the author of an additional set of anonymous editions of grammatical, medical and Biblical works —exactly like his Biblia cum glossis from 1545 —which came from that print shop. These works were not completely original, but enriched and commented editions of previous works by other authors, much like what Servetus had done with his Geography of Ptolemy (1535). These works were anonymous due to four reasons: (the main one) the strong penalty Servetus got from the University of Paris, through its Medicine, Law and Theology Faculties; the fact that these works had references to authors who were forbidden in the Spanish Empire, and opposed by the Sorbonne Faculty of Theology, such as Erasmus and Robert Estienne; the fact that some other authors mentioned by these works, such as Mathurin Cordier and Robert Estienne, were at the same time very close to John Calvin; the prohibition of any Biblical translation into any common language, pushed by the Spanish Empire. The main works which Servetus edited at Jean Frellon's print shop were:

- 1543 Disticha de moribus nomine Catonis, Lyon, printed by Jean and François Frellon. One of the several Latin grammar treatises to Spanish, originally authored by Erasmus and Mathurin Cordier.
- 1543 Retratos o tablas de las Historias del Testamento Viejo, Lyon, printed by Jean and François Frellon. The Spanish "sommes" or summaries of specific chapters from the Old Testament. Originally printed in 1538 at Lyon by Melchior & Gaspard Trechsel, with woodcuts by Hans Holbein (Icones). There had been also a French edition in 1539. In this Spanish edition Servetus included a poem for each of the 92 woodcuts.
- 1543 Dioscorides, Lyon, printed by Jean and François Frellon. This work was a De Materia Medica, originally authored by Pedanius Dioscorides, and edited by the eminent Dr. Jean Ruel from Paris. Servetus added 20 long commentaries and 277 marginalia. There is also a different edition (or "homage edition") of this Dioscorides which was published in 1554, a year after Servetus's execution. In this 1554 edition printers B. Arnoullet, Frellon, Vincent and G. Rouillé included some of Servetus' comments from the 1543 Dioscorides, and added signed comments by Andrea Mattioli. In addition, there seems to be an extensive manuscript by Servetus related to this Dioscorides of 1543: a copy of a 1537 Dioscorides published by Dionisus Corronius, which Servetus used as a workbook for developing his medical ideas while he was a medical student in Paris and Montpelier. The copy is kept at the Complutesian University, in Madrid.
- 1543 Enchiridion. Dispensarium vulgo vocant, Lyon, printed by Jean and François Frellon. A pharmacological formulas handbook. Its previous edition had been completed by Thibault Lespleigney & François Chappuis. Servetus added 224 new formulas, credited 21 of them to his teacher prof. Sylvius, and also revealed some personal anecdotes regarding this professor. This is the twin work of 1543 Dioscorides, which formed a set for simples & compounds handbook.
- 1549 De octo orationis partium constructione, Lyon, printed by Jean Frellon. One of the Latin grammar treatises to Spanish, previously edited by Colet, Lily, Erasmus, and Junien Ranvier —Robert Estienne's print corrector.
- 1548–1550 A Giuntina edition of Galen’s Opera Omnia, Lyon, printed by Jean Frellon. A massive philological revision of Galen's works, in 6 volumes. Its first edition had been published by printer Giunta in Venice.
- 1551 Biblia Sacrosancta veteris et Novi Testamenti, Lyon, printed by Jean Frellon. In this Bible edition, Servetus included an expanded version of his own commentaries from the 1542 Holy Bible according to the translation of Santes Pagnino.

== See also ==
- Sebastian Castellio
- Physician writer
- List of multiple discoveries
