= Motus MST =

American sport touring motorcycle

MST / MSTR
- Motus MSTR
- Manufacturer: Motus Motorcycles
- Parent company: Birmingham Motorcycle Company
- Production: 2016–2018
- Class: Sport Touring
- Engine: 1,650 cc (101 cu in) 2-valve longitudinal 90° pushrod V4
- Bore / stroke: 3.41 in × 2.76 in (86.5 mm × 70.0 mm)
- Top speed: 168.69 mph (271.48 km/h)
- Power: MST: 165 hp (123 kW) @ 7,700 rpm (claimed); MSTR: 180 hp (130 kW) (claimed)
- Torque: MST: 123.0 lb⋅ft (166.8 N⋅m) @ 5,000 rpm (claimed); MSTR: 126.0 lb⋅ft (170.8 N⋅m) (claimed)
- Transmission: 6-speed, wet clutch, chain final drive
- Frame type: Steel trellis
- Suspension: Front:Öhlins 43mm fork adjustable for spring preload, compression and rebound damping; 5.1-in. travel Rear:Progressive shock adjustable for spring preload; 5.5-in. travel
- Brakes: Front:Dual Brembo four-piston calipers, 320mm discs Rear:Brembo two-piston caliper, 200mm disc
- Rake, trail: 26.0°/4.25 in.
- Wheelbase: 58.0 inches (1,470 mm)
- Seat height: 32.0 in (810 mm); 33.5 in (850 mm)
- Weight: 500 lb (230 kg)(claimed) (dry); 585–565 lb (265–256 kg)MST / MSTR(claimed) (wet)
- Fuel capacity: 5.5 US gal (21 L; 4.6 imp gal)

The Motus MST was a sport touring motorcycle produced from 2014 to 2018 by Motus Motorcycles of Birmingham, Alabama. Motus was the newest motorcycle manufacturer in the United States. Motus' partner in developing the MST was race car manufacturer Pratt & Miller, who were credited with product engineering, development, testing and validation for the MST.

The MST was powered by a 90° pushrod V4 engine that was mounted longitudinally, with its crankshaft aligned fore-and-aft. This was the first V4 ever used in an American motorcycle.

The prototype was first shown to the public at Daytona Beach Bike Week in March, 2011. The production MSTR bike was ridden at Bonneville Speedway and set the official land speed record for the world's fastest pushrod-engine production motorcycle, with speeds of 163.98 mph (263.90 km/h) and 165.81 mph (266.85 km/h) for the records and a top speed of 168.69 mph (271.48 km/h).
