= Symphorien Champier =

French doctor and writer (1471–1539)

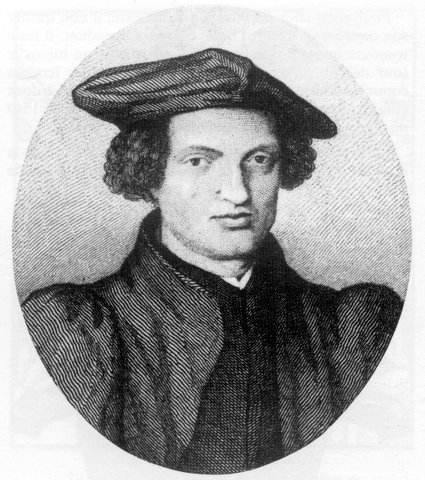

Symphorien Champier (1471–1539) was a doctor and writer from Lyon. He was born in Saint-Symphorien, France.

Champier was a relation of the Chevalier de Bayard through his wife, Marguerite Terrail.

== Life ==
Champier learned some Latin and about pharmaceuticals from his father, an apothecary, before attending the University of Paris.

He completed his doctor of medicine at Montpellier, in 1504.

Champier was the personal physician of Antoine, Duke of Lorraine, whom he followed to Italy with Louis XII, attending to several battles, and finally settling in Lyon. He worked in Lyon alongside François Rabelais (who wrote satirically of him in Gargantua and Pantagruel), where he established the College of the Doctors of Lyon.

In Lyon, he fulfilled the duties of an alderman, starting in 1519, and his house was sacked during riots in 1529.

His fame was considerable in Lyon, which in the 16th century was the greatest manufacturer of medical books in France, with editors such as Sébastien Gryphe. In addition to medicinal science, Champier studied Greek scholars and Arab medicine and composed a great number of historical works, including Chroniques de Savoie in 1516 and Vie de Bayard in 1525. During his last years in Lyon, he printed several medicine books against Arab medicine, a falsification of Greek science according to his judgment.

He is most famous today for his pro-woman tract La nef des dames vertueuses [The Ship of Virtuous Ladies], one of the first 'feminist' tracts written in French. This book, first published in 1503, is composed of four books. Book 4 essentially imports neoplatonism [from Marsilio Ficino] to France for pro-woman ends.

He was an extreme opponent to Renaissance occultism, and wrote in 1532 an Epistola campegiana de transmutatione metallorum contra alchimistas.

Champier added a codicil to his last will in May 1539, and he is not noticed in any document after this date, so historians believe that he died in the second part of 1539.

== See also ==
- Pierre Terrail, seigneur de Bayard
- François Rabelais
