= Motu Iti =

Motu Iti (lit. Little Island) may refer to:

- Motu Iti (Marquesas Islands), or Hatu Iti, a small island in the northern Marquesas Islands
- Motu Iti (Rapa Nui), a small islet near Easter Island
- Motu Iti (Society Islands), or Tupai, a small island in the Leeward Society Islands
- Motuiti or Kennedy Island, a phantom island reported in the New Hebrides at 11°17′S 167°58′E or 8°35′S 167°48′E
