= Motu One =

Motu One, which means "Sand Island" in various Polynesian languages, refers to several islands throughout Polynesia, including:

- Motu One (Marquesas Islands)
- Motu One (Society Islands)
- Motu One, off the island of Tubuai
