= Pierre Petit (scholar) =

French scholar, physician and poet (1617–1687)

Pierre Petit (French: [pjɛʁ pəti]; 1617–1687) was a French scholar, physician, poet and Latin writer.

Born at Paris, Petit studied medicine at Montpellier, where he took the degree of MD, though he did not practice medicine afterwards. Returning to Paris, he resided for some time with the president Lamoignon, as tutor to his sons, and afterwards as a literary companion with Aymar de Nicolai, first president of the chamber of accounts. He died shortly after taking a wife.

== Works ==
His most important works are:

- An Elegy upon the Death of Gabriel Naudé. 1653.
- De Motu Animalium Spontaneo, liber unus. 1660, 8vo.
- De Extensione Animæ et Rerum Incorporearum Natura, libri duo. 1665.
- Epistolae Apologetica; A. Menjoti de variis Sectis Amplectendis examen: ad Medicos Parisienses, Autore Adriano Scauro, D.M. 1666, 4to.
- Apologia pro genuitate Fragmenti Satyrici Petroniani. 1666, 8vo.

Under the pseudonym Marinus Statileus:

- De nova Curandorum Morborum Ratione per Transfusionem Sanguinis. 1667, 4to. In which he objects to the then fashionable speculation relative to the cure of diseases by blood transfusion.

Under the pseudonym Euthyphron:

- Miscellanearum Observationum, libri iv. Utrecht, 1683, 8vo
- Selectorum Poematum, liber ii. accessit Dissertatio de Furore Poetico. Paris, 1688, 8vo.
- De Amazonibus, Dissertatio. Paris, 1685, 12mo. An attempt to prove, from medals and monuments, that a race of amazons existed.
- De Natura et Moribus Anthropophagorum, Dissertatio. Utrecht, 1688, 8vo.

He also wrote, under his own name:

- Gelliani problematis explicatio, sive de continentia Alexandri Magni, et Publii Scipionis Africani. Dialogus. Paris, 1668, 12mo.

Within the dialogue, which he narrates, he appears as Euthyphro.

In 1726, his Commentary on the first three books of Aretaeus appeared together with Life of Petit by Maittaire.
