= Television in the United Kingdom =

The BBC is the largest public broadcaster in the world.

Television broadcasts in the United Kingdom began in 1932, though regular broadcasts would only begin four years later. Television began as a public service which was free of advertising, which followed the first demonstration of a transmitted moving image in 1926. Currently, the United Kingdom has a collection of free-to-air, free-to-view and subscription services over a variety of distribution media, through which there are over 480 channels (Note: Taking the base Sky EPG TV Channels. A breakdown is impossible due to a) the number of platforms, b) duplication of services, c) regional services, d) part time operations, and e) audio. For the Sky platform alone, there are basically 485 TV channels, additionally 57 "timeshifted versions", 36 HDTV versions, 42 regional TV options, 81 audio channels, and 5 promotion channels as of mid-2010) for consumers as well as on-demand content. There are six main TV channel owners who are responsible for most material viewed.

There are 27,000 hours of domestic content produced a year, at a cost of £2.6 billion. (Note: Taking the data from note 1 above, this is a very crude estimate) Since 24 October 2012, all television broadcasts in the United Kingdom have been in a digital format, following the end of analogue transmissions in Northern Ireland. Digital content is delivered via terrestrial, satellite and cable, as well as over IP. As of 2003, 53.2% of households watch through terrestrial, 31.3% through satellite, and 15.6% through cable.

The Royal Television Society (RTS) is a British-based educational charity for the discussion and analysis of television in all its forms, past, present, and future. It is the oldest television society in the world.

== Broadcast television providers ==
Free-to-air, free-to-view and subscription providers operate, with differences in the number of channels, capabilities such as the EPG, VOD, HDTV, interactive television via the red button, and coverage across the UK. All providers make available the UK's five most-watched channels: BBC One, BBC Two, ITV (ITV1/STV), Channel 4 and 5.

Broadcast television is distributed as radio waves via terrestrial or satellite transmissions, or as electrical or light signals through ground-based cables. In the UK, these use the Digital Video Broadcasting standard. Most TVs sold in the UK (as well as much of the rest of Europe) come with a DVB-T (terrestrial) tuner. Set-top boxes are generally used to receive channels from other providers. All of the traditional services have integrated their broadcast TV with streamed channels or on-demand programmes when connected to the Internet. Since 2022, broadcast-like TV services can be wholly received via Internet-connected devices, which do not require an aerial, satellite or a traditional cable TV connection.

Provider	Launched	Free or pay	No. broadcast channels	Households	Notes
Terrestrial and Internet hybrid
BT TV	2006 (Note: As BT Vision)	Pay	Terrestrial channels: As Freeview; IPTV: Unknown	0.95 million (Note: Listed as BT Vision in Barb's data)	Freeview reception only on boxes equipped with an aerial input and set to 'aerial mode'. Requires BT Broadband or EE Broadband
Freeview / Freeview Play	2002	Free	50+ (TV); 24 (radio)	2.87 million (Note: This figure is for terrestrial only households, calculated from column I of Barb's figures (DTT only households with BT Vision and Talktalk deducted, which assumes they are subscription Youview devices connected to an aerial))	On demand via Freeview Play devices
Netgem TV	2019	Pay	Terrestrial channels: As Freeview; IPTV: Unknown	Unknown	
TalkTalk TV	2000 (Note: As HomeChoice)	Pay	Terrestrial channels: As Freeview; IPTV: Unknown	0.25 million	Requires TalkTalk Broadband
Satellite
Freesat	2008	Free	115 (TV); 38 (radio) (Note: Around 200 additional channels available if manually tuned; see List of free-to-air channels at 28°E)	0.89 million	
Sky	1998	Pay	400+ (TV); 160+ (radio)	6.5 million	
Cable
Virgin Media	2006	Pay	250+ (TV); 35+ (radio)	3.47 million (Note: Taken from the cable TV figure in Barb's data)	
Internet "streaming" (IPTV) (Note: This section refers to closed platform TV services which use an Internet-connected box connected to a TV, and a remote control giving direct access to a curated list of live channels via an on-screen guide. The list doesn't include individual over-the-top media services or streaming apps such as Netflix. Channels, on-demand TV and the programme guide are received via the Internet connection instead of broadcast infrastructure.)
Freely	2024	Free	25+ (TV)	Unknown	
BT TV	2022	Pay	Unknown	Unknown	Requires BT Broadband or EE Broadband
Sky Stream / Sky Glass	Sky Glass: 2021; Sky Stream: 2022	Pay	Unknown	Unknown	
Flex (Note: As Stream from Virgin Media)	2022	Pay	Unknown	Unknown	Requires Virgin Media Broadband

Barb Audiences publish quarterly statistics of the number of UK households per broadcast TV platform. The following table shows a summary of TV availability for Quarter 4 2024 and earlier quarters. Some of the figures are derived from others and will contain inaccuracies as Barb's data doesn't state the overlap between different combinations of technologies.

Cohort	Households Q4 2024	Q2 2021 (Note: This is the first quarter with IPTV data)	Q1 2010
Households with or without a TV
Households with a TV	27.52 million	26.92 million	25.95 million
Households without a TV	1.81 million (Note: Total households minus TV households)	1.52 million	0.93 million
Broadcast TV households - terrestrial, satellite or cable
Terrestrial only	3.06 million	4.38 million	9.96 million
Terrestrial TV alongside other services	14.28 million	16.92 million	16.61 million
Satellite	7.73 million	9.33 million	10.32 million
Cable	3.47 million	3.91 million	3.92 million
Free terrestrial or satellite TV	3.98 million (Note: Sum of Freeview, Freesat and non-subscription Sky)	5.36 million	(Note: Not enough data)
Subscription terrestrial/satellite/cable TV	11.78 million (Note: Sum of Sky subscription, other satellite, cable, BT Vision, Talktalk, Plusnet, other services)	14.29 million	-
Total broadcast TV	15.76 million	19.65 million	25.95 million
No broadcast TV	13.57 million	8.79 million	0.93 million
IPTV households
IPTV with broadcast TV	10.46 million (Note: Total broadcast TV minus 5.30 million broadcast only households (TV households minus IPTV total))	12.13 million	-
IPTV without broadcast TV	11.76 million (Note: Total IPTV minus IPTV with broadcast households)	7.27 million	-
IPTV total	22.22 million	19.4 million	-
No IPTV	7.11 million	9.03 million	

=== Digital terrestrial television ===
The primary digital terrestrial TV service, Freeview, launched in 2002 and is free-of-charge to view. It replaced the subscription service named ONdigital or ITV Digital, which ran from 1998 to 2002. Digital terrestrial television was itself the replacement for analogue terrestrial TV, which ran from 1936 to 2012.

As of March 2021, Freeview provides over seventy TV and radio channels, which are received via an aerial. It is operated by Everyone TV and DTV Services Ltd., joint ventures between the BBC, ITV, Channel 4 and Channel 5. The transmitter network is predominately operated by Arqiva. The TV channels are transmitted in bundles, called multiplexes, and the available channels are dependent on how many multiplexes are transmitted in each area. The six national multiplexes are available to 90% of households from 92 transmitters; and three multiplexes are available to 9% of households from 1,067 transmitters. (Note: Coverage figures calculated from the per-multiplex coverage in Figure 42 of Connected Nations Report 2017. Transmitter counts calculated from the Television transmitter frequency data spreadsheet.) In Northern Ireland, a multiplex carrying channels from the Republic of Ireland can reach 71% of Northern Irish households from 3 transmitters. Local TV and radio is available to 54% of households from an additional multiplex via 44 transmitters, and an extra multiplex is available to 54% of households in Greater Manchester.

Multiple vendors sell hybrid set-top-boxes or smart TVs which combine terrestrial channels with streamed (Internet TV) content. Internet-based TV apps such as BBC iPlayer, ITVX and Channel 4 are available via the broadband connection of Freeview Play and Netgem devices. These also support optional subscription services such as Netflix and Prime Video. BT TV and TalkTalk TV offer additional subscription services for their respective broadband customers using Netgem or YouView devices. Saorview, the terrestrial TV service in the Republic of Ireland which launched in 2011, can be received in parts of Northern Ireland via overspill transmissions.

=== Cable television ===
Many regional companies developed cable-television services in the late 1980s and 1990s as licences for cable television were awarded on a city-by-city basis. The mid-1990s saw the companies start to merge and the turn of the century only three big companies remained. In 2007 Telewest and NTL merged, resulting in the formation of Virgin Media, which is available to 55% of households. Cable TV is a subscription service normally bundled with a phone line and broadband.

=== Satellite television ===
There are two distinctly marketed direct-broadcast satellite (DBS) services (also known as direct-to-home (DTH), to be distinguished from satellite signals intended for non-consumer reception). Sky TV is a subscription service operated by Sky Ltd, owned by Comcast, which launched in 1998 as SkyDigital. Compared to the previous analogue service which had launched in 1989, it provided more channels, widescreen, interactive TV and a near video-on-demand service using staggered start times for pay-per-view content. Innovations since have included high definition, 3D TV, a digital video recorder, the ability to view recordings on other devices, remote operation via the Internet to add recordings, and on-demand content via the satellite-receiver's broadband connection of both Sky and third-party TV. The Sky subscription also includes access to Sky Go, which allows mobile devices and computers to access subscription content via the Internet.

Freesat is a free satellite service operated by Everyone TV, who also operate Freeview. Like Sky, it provides high-definition content, digital recording and video-on-demand via the broadband connection. Freesat and Sky TV transmit from SES Astra satellites at 28.2° east (Astra 2E/2F/2G). As the satellites are in geostationary orbit, they are positioned above the earth's equator (0°N 28.2°E) approximately 35,786 km above sea level; this places them above the Democratic Republic of the Congo.

== Internet video services ==
TV via the Internet can be streamed or downloaded, and consist of amateur or professionally produced content. In the UK, most broadcasters provide catch-up TV services which allow viewing of TV for a window after it was broadcast. Online video can be viewed via mobile devices, computers, TVs equipped with a built in Internet connection, or TVs connected to an external set-top-box, streaming stick or games console. Most of the broadcast TV providers have integrated their set-top-boxes with Internet video to provide a hybrid broadcast and online service.

=== Catch-up services ===
Since 2006, UK channel owners and content producers have been creating Internet services to access their programmes using catch-up television (usually via video on demand). Often, these are available for a window after the broadcast schedule. These services generally block users outside of the UK.

Service name	Owner	Broadcast channels with catch-up	Catch-up period	Additional content	Streamed	Download	Free/Pay	Site
BBC iPlayer	BBC	BBC channels, S4C	30 days	Yes	Yes	Yes	Free	
S4C	S4C	S4C	35 days	Yes	Yes	No	Free	
Channel 4	Channel Four Television Corporation	Channel 4, E4, More4, 4seven, Film4	30 days	Yes	Yes	Yes	Streaming: Free; No Adverts: Subscription	
ITVX	ITV plc	ITV1–4, ITV Quiz	30 days	Yes	Yes	With subscription	Streaming: Free; No Adverts: Subscription	
5	Skydance Corporation (Paramount Networks UK & Australia)	5, 5USA, 5STAR, 5Action, 5Select	30 days	Yes	Yes	No	Free	
Sky Go	Sky UK	Up to 65 channels	Unknown	Box sets with additional subscription	Yes	With additional subscription	Subscription	
STV Player	STV Group	STV	30 days	Yes	Yes	No	Streaming: Free; No Adverts: Subscription	
U	UKTV Media	U&Dave, U&Drama, U&W, U&Yesterday	30 days	Yes	Yes	No	Free	

=== Online video services for professionally produced content ===
UK TV online services offer subscription, rental, and purchase options for viewing online TV. Most are available via the Internet but some require a specific broadband provider. Some services sell 3rd party services, such as Amazon's Prime Video.

Barb tracks the number of households subscribing to subscription video-on-demand services. Their statistics for Q3 2024 show that 69% of households subscribe to at least one of these.

	Households	%
No subscription	9.1 million	31%
Subscribe to one or more services	20.1 million	69%

The table following is the number of subscribers per service according to Barb's Q3 2024 figures. Barb's data excludes services with a household penetration below 5% (1.5 million households), omitting services like ITVX Premium. It also omits services linked to a broadcast TV subscription, like Sky Go, and free services like BBC iPlayer, as they don't have a paid subscription.

Service	Households
Netflix	17.3m
Amazon Prime Video	13.4m
Disney+	7.5m
Discovery+	3.2m
Paramount+	2.8m
AppleTV	2.5m
Now	2.1m

The table below summarises some of the available Internet TV services in the UK. For brevity, it does not include catch-up-only or amateur-only services, individual channels, distributors of illegal or adult content, services which solely redistribute free broadcast channels, portals, or services which don't target the UK. 'Free' refers to free at the point of consumption, not including fees for Internet connectivity or a TV licence.

	Free	Subscription only	Buy or rent	Subscription or buy or rent
UK services	BBC iPlayer; BFI Player; Channel 4 ITVX; 5 STV Player; U	Channel 4+ Flix Premiere; ITVX Premium; Now; Sky Go requires Sky TV; STV Player+ Virgin TV Go requires Virgin TV	Curzon Home Cinema; Dogwoof On Demand; Sky Store; Virgin Media Store	BFI Player; BT TV requires BT or EE Broadband; Digital Theatre; TalkTalk TV requires TalkTalk Broadband
International services	Arte; Filmzie; JustWatchTV; Plex; Pluto TV; Revry; RTÉ Player; Runtime; Samsung TV Plus; Tubi; Vevo wedotv	Apple TV; HBO Max; Netflix; DAZN; Hayu; Paramount+	iTunes Store (Apple); Microsoft Films & TV; YouTube Movies & TV	Disney+ Prime Video (Amazon); Rakuten TV

Other international streaming services with pricing in GBP include: Acorn TV, Arrow, BroadwayHD, CHILI, Crunchyroll, Curiosity Stream, DAFilms, Dekkoo, Demand Africa, Docsville, Eros Now, GMA Play, GuideDoc, Hayu, Hoichoi, Hotstar, iQiyi, iWant, Klassiki, Magellan TV, MeWatch, MovieSaints, Mubi, NewsPlayer+, Pilipinas Live Plus, Rakuten Viki, RTB GO, Shahid VIP, Shudder, Simple South, SonyLIV, Spamflix, Sun NXT, True Story, TVB Anywhere+, TVPlayer, TVRI Klik, VMX, Viva One, WOW Presents Plus, YuppTV and ZEE5.

== Channels and channel owners ==
=== Viewing statistics ===
==== Most viewed channels ====
Barb Audiences measures television ratings in the UK. As of November 2024, the average daily viewing time per home was 2 hours 54 minutes (of Barb-reported channels, includes broadcast and Internet viewings). 13 channels have a monthly share of ≥ 1.0%, as well as non-linear (streamed) viewing of BBC and ITV plc. programmes.

Channels with a viewing share of ≥ 1.0%, November 2024
Channel	Owner	Free/Pay	Monthly share (%)	Average daily minutes (mins:secs)
BBC One	BBC	Free	21.01	32:23
ITV1	ITV plc	Free	15.21	23:26
BBC Two	BBC	Free	5.20	8:01
Channel 4	Channel Four Television Corporation	Free	4.88	7:31
5	Channel 5 Broadcasting (Skydance Corporation)	Free	3.99	6:09
BBC Non-linear (on TV set)	BBC	Free	2.57	3:57
ITV3	ITV plc	Free	2.11	3:15
E4	Channel Four Television Corporation	Free	1.80	2:46
ITV2	ITV plc	Free	1.61	2:29
U&Drama	UKTV Media (BBC)	Free	1.36	2:05
ITV Non-Linear (on TV set)	ITV plc	Free	1.19	1:50
Sky Sports Main Event	Sky UK (Comcast)	Subscription	1.11	1:43
Film4	Channel Four Television Corporation	Free	1.09	1:41
BBC News	BBC	Free	1.05	1:37
5USA	Channel 5 Broadcasting (Skydance Corporation)	Free	1.04	1:36

==== Most viewed broadcaster groups ====
As of November 2024, there are 10 broadcaster groups with a monthly share of ≥ 1.0% (although Barb reports sub-groups of BBC and Paramount individually, and it's unclear what the 'ITV' group refers to).

Broadcaster groups with a viewing share of ≥ 1%, November 2024
Channel owner	Share of total viewing time (%)	Average daily minutes
BBC	33.11	51:02
ITV	21.81	33:37
Channel Four Television Corporation	10.23	15:46
Sky UK (Comcast)	9.48	14:37
Channel 5 Broadcasting (Skydance Corporation)	6.61	10:11
Skydance Corporation (Within channels formerly owned by Warner Bros. Discovery)	5.20	8:01
UKTV Media (BBC)	4.42	6:49
Non-grouped Barb-reported channels	1.96	3:01
Narrative Entertainment	1.50	2:19
CBS AMC Networks UK (Skydance Corporation/AMC)	1.32	2:02

=== BBC and UKTV ===

The British Broadcasting Corporation (BBC) is the world's oldest and largest broadcaster, and is the country's principal public service broadcaster of radio and television. BBC Television is funded primarily by a television licence and from sales of its programming to overseas markets. It does not carry advertising. The licence fee is levied on all households that watch or record TV as it is broadcast and the fee is determined by periodic negotiation between the government and the BBC.

Its first analogue terrestrial channel was launched by the BBC Television Service in 1936. It rebranded to BBC1 in 1964 following the launch of BBC2, the UK's third analogue terrestrial channel after ITV. BBC News 24 launched as an analogue cable channel in 1997, later rebranding to BBC News in 2008. BBC Parliament, which was originally an analogue cable channel known as The Parliamentary Channel, was acquired by the BBC in 1998. From 1998 onwards the BBC started digital TV transmissions, launching new channels and broadcasting via satellite in addition to terrestrial and cable.

The BBC's Internet-based service iPlayer contains content from the BBC's TV channels, the Welsh-language public-service broadcaster S4C, as well as videos created from BBC radio programmes.

UKTV is a commercial broadcaster owned by BBC Studios, one of the BBC's commercial units. Originating in 1992 with UK Gold, UKTV expanded its channels from 1997 onwards, with the BBC taking full ownership in June 2019. Unlike the BBC's public service channels, the UKTV channels contain advertising.

	Public service channels	UKTV (Commercial)
Free channels	BBC One, BBC Two, BBC Three, BBC Four, BBC News, BBC Parliament, CBBC, CBeebies, BBC Scotland, BBC Alba, BBC Red Button	U&Dave, U&Drama, U&Eden, U&W, U&Yesterday
Subscription channels	None	U&Alibi, U&Dave HD, U&Gold, U&W HD, U&Yesterday HD
Internet TV services	BBC iPlayer	U

=== ITV ===
ITV, branded as ITV1 or STV, is the network of fourteen regional and one national commercial television franchise, founded in 1955 to provide competition to the BBC. ITV was the country's first commercial television provider funded by advertisements. Each region was originally independent and used its own on-air identity. Through a series of mergers following relaxation of regulation in 1990, thirteen of the franchises are now held by ITV plc, and the remaining two by STV Group. Since 2012, ITV plc produces the network nationally, with STV Group acting as an affiliate.

STV Group uses the channel name of STV for its two franchises in Scotland. ITV plc names the channel UTV in Northern Ireland, and ITV1 for the remaining regions, although UTV has used ITV or ITV1 branding since April 2020. The national breakfast-time franchise is held by ITV plc, which appears as an indistinguishable programming block across the network. Legally, the network has been known as Channel 3 since 1990, which is the name Ofcom uses.

ITV plc or its predecessor companies created additional free or subscription channels, of which the oldest still running is ITV2, having launched in 1998. Several older channels have since stopped broadcasting; the oldest of these is Super Channel which was launched by a consortium of ITV regional companies in 1987, was sold and eventually closed in 1998.

	ITV plc	STV Group
Free broadcast channels	ITV1, ITV2, ITV3, ITV4, ITV Quiz	STV
Internet TV Services	ITVX	STV Player

=== Channel 4 ===
Launched in 1982, Channel 4 is a state-owned national broadcaster which is funded by its commercial activities (including advertising). Channel 4 has expanded greatly after gaining greater independence from the IBA, especially in the multi-channel digital world launching E4, Film4, More4, 4Music, 4seven and various timeshift services. Since 2005, it has been a member of the Freeview consortium, and operates one of the six digital terrestrial multiplexes with ITV as Digital 3&4. Since the advent of digital television, Channel 4 is now also broadcast in Wales across all digital platforms. Channel 4 was the first British channel not to carry regional variations for programming, however it does have six set advertising regions.

	Channel 4 channels
Free channels	Channel 4, Channel 4 HD, More4, E4, E4 Extra, Film4, 4seven, 4seven HD
Subscription	E4 HD, More4 HD, Film4 HD
Internet TV Services	Channel 4 (VoD service)

=== Sky ===
Sky is a European broadcaster owned by global American media conglomerate Comcast. Sky Television launched in 1989, with a 4-channel service received via satellite. The channels at launch were Sky Channel, Sky News, Sky Movies and Eurosport. They were initially free to receive, and Sky Movies was the first to move to a subscription early in 1990. Sky News was the UK's first dedicated news channel. The new service was the UK's first consumer satellite TV service, beating rival BSB, with which Sky would later merge to become BSkyB. Sky's satellite service grew to become a subscription platform through which Sky offer their own channels, pay-per-view services and channels from other broadcasters. Sky's digital platform launched in 1998, with the original analogue service closing in 2001. Sky was acquired by Comcast in 2018.

Since 2012, Sky operate Now, an Internet TV streaming service offering subscriptions without a fixed-term contract.

Sky's channel portfolio has grown greatly since the launch of digital TV. Sky make their channels available via rival cable and Internet services as well as their own satellite service and Now.

	Comcast			
	Sky UK			NBCUniversal
	Wholly owned	At The Races (joint venture)	A&E Networks UK (joint venture)	NBCUniversal
Free channels	Challenge, Sky Arts, Sky Mix HD, Sky News	None	Blaze	CNBC
Subscription	Sky Arts HD, Sky Atlantic, Sky Comedy, Sky Crime, Sky Documentaries, Sky Kids, Sky Max, Sky Nature, Sky News HD, Sky Replay, Sky Showcase, Sky Witness; Sky Cinema channels: Action, Animation, Comedy, Drama, Family, Greats, Hits, Premiere, Sci-fi & Horror, Select, Thriller; Sky Sports channels: Action, Active, Arena, Cricket, F1, Football, Golf, Main Event, Mix, Premier League, Sports News	Sky Sports Racing	Crime & Investigation, Lifetime, Sky History, Sky History 2	E!, Movies24, Sky Sci-Fi
Pay-per-view	Sky Sports Box Office	None	None	None
Internet TV Services	Sky Go, Now	ATR Player	None	Hayu

=== Skydance Corporation ===

5 was the fifth analogue terrestrial channel to launch, in March 1997. Due to constraints with the available UHF frequencies at the time, many households had to retune their video recorders, which shared the frequency on their RF output with the frequency used by Channel 5's new broadcasts. Channel 5 was the first terrestrial channel to also broadcast via satellite. From 2006 onwards, Channel 5 launched new digital channels and an Internet on-demand service. After changing ownership several times, in May 2014 Channel 5 and its sister channels were acquired by Viacom, an American media conglomerate, known as Skydance since 2026.

By the time it acquired Channel 5, Paramount already operated a large number of subscription channels in the UK, including the MTV, Nickelodeon and Comedy Central channels, which are available via Sky TV, Virgin Media and Now. In terms of viewing share, the combined viewing across Paramount's channels make the group the UK's fifth largest broadcaster, according to Barb's viewing figures for 1 March 2020.

Paramount additionally operates the Pluto TV and Paramount+ Internet streaming services.

	Paramount Global				
	Channel 5 Broadcasting	Viacom International Media Networks UK	Nickelodeon UK	Paramount UK Partnership (co-owned)	CBS AMC Networks UK (co-owned)
Free channels	5, 5Action, 5Select, 5Star, 5USA	None	None	None	True Crime, True Crime Xtra, Legend, Legend Xtra
Subscription	5Action HD	MTV, MTV Hits, MTV Music, MTV 80s, MTV 90s	Nickelodeon, Nick Jr, Nick Jr Too, Nicktoons	Comedy Central, Comedy Central Extra	None
Internet TV Services	5 (Streaming Service)	None	None	None	Watch Free UK

== Local and regional television ==
=== Local television ===
Since 2012, additional local TV channels are available via Freeview channel 7 or 8. The channels are licensed by Ofcom, with 34 local TV channels licensed as of 2 July 2020. Nineteen of the licences are held by That's TV, and eight are held by Made Television. The remainder are held independently. Each licence contains the amount of local TV programming required. As an example, the licence for Scarborough, which is held by That's TV, requires seven hours of local programming per week (one hour per day on average). Thirteen additional licences were originally intended, but Ofcom decided not to advertise these in June 2018.

The way Ofcom structured local television – being dependent on terrestrial transmission – was criticised in a Guardian article in 2015 for being "years behind in its thinking", as it does not account for the Internet. In the article, Ofcom responded that the licensing scheme was inherited from the Department for Culture, Media and Sport. In April 2018, BBC News reported that "many of the stations have been ridiculed for the poor quality of their output or have been reported to Ofcom for breaching broadcasting rules". The local TV companies receive a subsidy from the BBC of £147.50 per local news story, funded by the licence fee, paid whether the BBC uses the content or not. A June 2018 article on BuzzFeed claimed that That's TV was created "primarily to extract money from the BBC whilst delivering little content of useful value".

=== Regional television ===
BBC One, BBC Two and the ITV network (comprising ITV1 and STV) are split into regions in which regional news and other programming is broadcast. ITV1/STV is split into fourteen geographic licencees, with several of these split into two or three sub-regions, resulting in a greater total number of regional news programmes. Ofcom sets a quota for the BBC and ITV on the amount of regional programming required, shown in the following table. Ofcom's quota for S4C is 60 hours per week.

Sub-regions per channel
	Standard definition	+1	High definition	Ofcom regional programming quota	Notes
BBC One	16 (Freeview only)	N/A	16	5000 hours/year in total (equivalent to 6 hours per week per region on average)	See List of BBC regional news programmes
BBC Two	3 (Freeview only)	N/A	3	5000 hours/year in total (equivalent to 6 hours per week per region on average)	
ITV1	19 (Freeview only)	11 (Freeview); 4 (satellite); 6 (cable)	6 (Freeview); 18 (satellite); 17 (cable)	English licensees – 3.2 hours/week Scotland and Wales - 5.3 hours/week Northern Ireland - 5.8 hours/week	See List of ITV regions, ITV regional programming
STV	4 (Freeview); 2 (satellite)	2 (Freeview/cable); 0 (satellite)	1 (Freeview); 2 (Freesat); 3 (cable); 4 (Sky)	English licensees – 3.2 hours/week Scotland and Wales - 5.3 hours/week Northern Ireland - 5.8 hours/week	See List of ITV regions, ITV regional programming

Advertising on ITV1/STV and Channel 4 is regional. Linear Channel 4 is split into 6 advertising regions, but has no regional programming.

=== Country-specific channels ===
BBC Scotland and the Gaelic-language channel BBC Alba target Scotland, and the Welsh-language channel S4C targets Wales. In Northern Ireland, channels originating in the Republic of Ireland are available, including RTÉ One, RTÉ2 and the Irish-language TG4.

== Programming ==
British programming has varied styles, such as a soap opera. This a continuous epic which comes out over select days of a week; a traditional weekly compilation called an omnibus are also produced. In some cases, episodes in a run are grouped into chaptered closed narratives called serials. Programmes can also have runs produced for broadcast once or twice in a year. Runs of this type, weeklies, play out over the span of a month or two, having a bookended narrative. A run is informally known as a series to British audiences.

=== 100 Greatest British Television Programmes ===
100 Greatest British Television Programmes was a list compiled in 2000 by the British Film Institute (BFI), chosen by a poll of industry professionals, to determine what were the greatest British television programmes of any genre ever to have been screened. Although not including any programmes made in 2000 or later, the list is useful as an indication of what were generally regarded as the most successful British programmes of the 20th century. The top 10 programmes are:

Rank	Programme	Channel	Year
1	Fawlty Towers	BBC2	1975–1979
2	Cathy Come Home (The Wednesday Play)	BBC1	1966
3	Doctor Who	BBC1	1963–1989, 1996, 2005–present
4	The Naked Civil Servant	ITV	1975
5	Monty Python's Flying Circus	BBC2	1969–1974
6	Blue Peter	BBC1	1958–present
7	Boys from the Blackstuff	BBC2	1982
8	Parkinson	BBC1/ITV	1971–1982, 1998–2007
9	Yes Minister / Yes, Prime Minister	BBC2	1980–1988
10	Brideshead Revisited	ITV	1981

=== 100 Greatest TV Moments ===
100 Greatest TV Moments was a list compiled by Channel 4 in 1999. The top 10 entries are:

Rank	Programme	Channel	Year	Moment
1	News	BBC1 / BBC2 / ITV	1969	The Apollo 11 Moon landing
2	News	BBC1 / BBC2 / ITV	1990	The release of Nelson Mandela
3	News	BBC1 / ITV	1997	Michael Portillo loses his seat in the general election, which came to symbolise the end of the period of Conservative government which had begun in 1979 with Margaret Thatcher as Prime Minister
4	News	BBC1 / BBC2 / ITV	1997	The death of Diana, Princess of Wales
5	News	BBC1 / BBC2 / ITV	1989	The fall of the Berlin Wall
6	1966 FIFA World Cup	BBC1 / ITV	1966	Final: England beats Germany 4–2; commentator Kenneth Wolstenholme's quotation "They think it's all over"
7	Only Fools and Horses	BBC1	1989	"Yuppy Love": Del Boy falls through a bar flap
8	Live Aid	BBC1 / BBC2	1985	The multi-venue rock concert to raise funds for the famine of Ethiopia
9	Blackadder Goes Forth	BBC1	1989	"Goodbyeee": the protagonists go over the top
10	News	BBC / ITV	1963	John F. Kennedy assassination

=== List of most watched television broadcasts ===
The majority of special events attracting large audiences are often carried on more than one channel. The most-watched programme of all time on a single channel is the 1973 wedding ceremony of The Princess Anne, shown only on BBC1. The figures in these tables represent the average viewership achieved by each broadcast during its run-time and do not include peak viewership.

- Post-1981 figures verified by Barb Audiences
- Pre-1981 figures supplied by the British Film Institute (BFI)

Rank	Event	Viewers (millions)		Date	Network
Rank	Event	Total	Channel	Date	Network
1	1966 FIFA World Cup Final: England v West Germany	32.30		30 July 1966	BBC1/ITV
2	Funeral of Diana, Princess of Wales	32.10		6 September 1997	BBC1/ITV
3	Royal Family (documentary)	30.69		21 June 1969 and 28 June 1969	BBC1/ITV
4	UEFA Euro 2020 Final: Italy v England	29.85		11 July 2021	BBC One/ITV
5	Apollo 13 splashdown	28.60		17 April 1970	BBC1/ITV
6	1970 FA Cup Final replay	28.49		29 April 1970	BBC1/ITV
7	Wedding of Charles, Prince of Wales, and Lady Diana Spencer	28.40		29 July 1981	BBC1/ITV
8	Wedding of Princess Anne and Mark Phillips	27.60		14 November 1973	BBC1
9	Prime Minister Boris Johnson's statement on COVID-19	27.1	15.4	23 March 2020	BBC One
9	Prime Minister Boris Johnson's statement on COVID-19	27.1	5.7	23 March 2020	ITV
9	Prime Minister Boris Johnson's statement on COVID-19	27.1	1.6	23 March 2020	Channel 4
9	Prime Minister Boris Johnson's statement on COVID-19	27.1		23 March 2020	Channel 5
9	Prime Minister Boris Johnson's statement on COVID-19	27.1		23 March 2020	Sky News
9	Prime Minister Boris Johnson's statement on COVID-19	27.1		23 March 2020	BBC News
10	2012 Summer Olympics closing ceremony	24.46	24.46	12 August 2012	BBC One

Notes:

- The Wedding of Princess Margaret and Lord Snowdon (6 May 1960) was watched by an estimated 300 million viewers around the world.
- At least two Muhammad Ali boxing matches were reported to have been watched by at least 26 million viewers in the United Kingdom: the Fight of the Century (Ali vs. Frazier) was reported to have been watched by 27.5 million British viewers in 1971, and The Rumble in the Jungle (Ali vs. Foreman) was reported to have been watched by 26 million viewers on BBC1 in 1974.
- Live Aid is reported to have reached approximately 24.5 million British viewers in July 1985.
- The Wedding of Prince William and Catherine Middleton (29 April 2011) received a total audience peak of 26 million viewers, but this is a combined figure aggregated from the ten different channels that broadcast the ceremony. The highest figures of these were 13.59 million on BBC1, with an extra 4.02 million watching on ITV.

=== Genre lists ===
==== 100 Greatest Kids' TV shows ====
The 100 Greatest Kids' TV shows was a poll conducted by the British television channel Channel 4 in 2001. The top 5 UK-produced programmes are:

Rank	Programme	Year
1	The Muppet Show	1976–1981
2	Danger Mouse	1981–1992
3	Bagpuss	1974
4	Grange Hill	1978–2008
5	Mr Benn	1971–1972

==== British Academy Television Award for Best Drama Series ====
The British Academy Television Award for Best Drama Series is one of the major categories of the British Academy Television Awards. The last 5 winners are:

- 2026: Code of Silence – Mammoth Screen / ITV Studios
- 2025: Blue Lights – Two Cities Television / Gallagher Films
- 2024: Top Boy – Cowboy Films / Easter Partisan / DreamCrew / SpringHill Entertainment
- 2023: Bad Sisters – Merman / ABC Signature
- 2022: In My Skin – Expectation Entertainment / BBC Three

=== Terrestrial channel programming ===
==== Weekday ====
Weekday programming on terrestrial channels begins at 6 am with breakfast national news programmes (along with regional news updates) on BBC Breakfast on BBC One and Good Morning Britain on ITV, with Channel 5 showing children's programmes under the Milkshake! brand. Channel 4 predominately broadcasts comedy programmes such as Everybody Loves Raymond in its morning slot. The weekday breakfast news programme ends at 9:30 am on BBC One and 9 am on ITV.

Following this on BBC One, lifestyle programming is generally shown, including property, auction and home and gardening. BBC One continues this genre until after the lunchtime news, whereby afternoon has various factual shows and dramas. BBC Two airs the BBC News updates and political programming between 9 am and 1 pm. Channel 4 often shows home-project and archaeology lifestyle programming in the early afternoon after a Channel 4 News summary. Channel 5 broadcasts chat show programmes in the morning including Jeremy Vine with regular news bulletins. In the afternoon, it shows dramas followed by an hour of Australian soaps such as Home and Away and Neighbours and films.

News bulletins are broadcast between 6 pm and 7 pm on both BBC One and ITV, with BBC One beginning with the national BBC News at Six and ITV with the flagship regional news programme. At around 6:30 pm, BBC One broadcasts the regional news programmes whilst ITV broadcasts the ITV Evening News. Channel 4 News starts at 7 pm and 5 News broadcasts for an hour at 5 pm.

Primetime programming is usually dominated by further soaps, including EastEnders on BBC One, Coronation Street and Emmerdale on ITV, and Hollyoaks on Channel 4. These soap operas or 'continuing dramas' as they are now called can vary throughout the year, however weekly dramas, are also fixed to scheduling. BBC Two broadcasts factual programming, including lifestyle and documentaries. BBC Four begins programming at 7 pm. The channel shows a wide variety of programmes including arts, documentaries, music, international film, comedy, original programmes, drama and current affairs. It is required by its licence to air at least 100 hours of new arts and music programmes, 110 hours of new factual programmes and to premiere 20 foreign films each year. BBC One, BBC Two, ITV, Channel 4 and Channel 5 broadcast dramas and documentaries in the evenings. At 10 pm with the flagship national news on BBC One in BBC News at Ten (followed by Newsnight on BBC Two) and on ITV on ITV News at Ten followed by the regional late night news. Because of this, the UK can often rely more heavily on TV guides, be it with the newspaper, online, via information services on the television such as the BBC Red Button service or the built in Electronic Programme Guides.

==== Weekend ====
Weekend daytime programming traditionally consists of more lifestyle programming plus films and live and recorded coverage of sporting events on most weekend afternoons. There are further battles for viewers in the weekend primetime slot, often featuring documentaries and game shows in the evening. Lunchtime, early evening and late evening news programmes continue on BBC One and ITV although the length of the bulletins are shorter than during the week. Sunday night schedules usually consist of dramas, light entertainment, documentaries, films, music concerts, festivals or sporting events.

== Cultural impact ==
=== Christian morality ===
In 1963, Mary Whitehouse, incensed by the liberalising policies followed by Sir Hugh Greene, then director general of the BBC, began her letter writing campaign. She subsequently launched the Clean Up TV Campaign, and founded the National Viewers' and Listeners' Association in 1965. In 2008, Toby Young in an article for The Independent wrote: "On the wider question of whether sex and violence on TV has led to a general moral collapse in society at large, the jury is still out. No one doubts that Western civilization is teetering on the brink ... but it is unfair to lay the blame entirely at the feet of BBC2 and Channel 4."

In 2005, the BBC's broadcast of Jerry Springer: The Opera elicited 55,000 complaints, and provoked protests from Christian organisation Christian Voice, and a private prosecution against the BBC by the Christian Institute. A summons was not issued.

== Awards ==
The British Academy Television Awards are the most prestigious awards given in the British television industry, analogous to the Emmy Awards in the United States. They have been awarded annually since 1954, and are only open to British programmes. After all the entries have been received, they are voted for online by all eligible members of the Academy. The winner is chosen from the four nominees by a special jury of nine academy members for each award, the members of each jury selected by the Academy's Television Committee.

The National Television Awards is a British television awards ceremony, sponsored by ITV and initiated in 1995. Although not widely held to be as prestigious as the BAFTAs, the National Television Awards are probably the most prominent ceremony for which the results are voted on by the general public. Unlike the BAFTAs, the National Television Awards allow foreign programmes to be nominated, providing they have been screened on a British channel during the eligible time period.

== Regulation ==
Ofcom is the independent regulator and competition authority for the communication industries in the United Kingdom, including television. As the regulatory body for media broadcasts, Ofcom's duties include:

- Specification of the Broadcast Code, which took effect on 25 July 2005, with the latest version being published October 2008. The Code itself is published on Ofcom's website, and provides a mandatory set of rules which broadcast programmes must comply with. The 10 main sections cover protection of under-eighteens, harm and offence, crime, religion, impartiality and accuracy, elections, fairness, privacy, sponsorship and commercial references. As stipulated in the Communications Act 2003, Ofcom enforces adherence to the Code. Failure for a broadcaster to comply with the Code results in warnings, fines, and potentially revokation of a broadcasting licence.
- Rules on the amount and distribution of advertising, which also took effect July 2005
- Examining specific complaints by viewers or other bodies about programmes and sponsorship. Ofcom issues Broadcast Bulletins on a fortnightly basis which are accessible via its web site. As an example, a bulletin from February 2009 has a complaint from the National Heart Forum over sponsorship of The Simpsons by Domino's Pizza on Sky One. Ofcom concluded this was in breach of the Broadcast Code, since it contravened an advertising restriction of food high in fat, salt or sugar. (Restrictions in food and drink advertising to children were introduced in November 2006.)
- The management, regulation and assignment of the electromagnetic spectrum in the UK, and licensing of portions of the spectrum for television broadcasting
- Public consultations on matters relating to TV broadcasting. The results of the consultations are published by Ofcom, and inform the policies that Ofcom creates and enforces.

In 2008, Ofcom issued fines to the total of £7.7m. This included £5.67m of fines to ITV companies, including a £3m fine to LWT over voting irregularities on Saturday Night Takeaway, and fines totalling £495,000 to the BBC. Ofcom said phone-in scandals had contributed significantly to the fine totals.

The Committee for Advertising Practice (CAP, or BCAP) is the body contracted by Ofcom to create and maintain the codes of practice governing television advertising. The Broadcast Advertising Codes (or the TV codes) are accessible on CAP's web site. The Codes cover advertising standards (the TV Code), guidance notes, scheduling rules, text services (the Teletext Code) and interactive television guidance. The main sections of the TV Code concern compliance, programmes and advertising, unacceptable products, political and controversial issues, misleading advertising, harm and offence, children, medicines, treatments, health claims and nutrition, finance and investments, and religion.

The Advertising Standards Authority is an independent body responsible for resolving complaints relating to the advertising industry within the UK. It is not government funded, but funded by a levy on the advertising industry. It ensures compliance with the Codes created by CAP. The ASA covers all forms of advertising, not just television advertisements. The ASA can refer problematic adverts to Ofcom, since the channels carrying the adverts are ultimately responsible for the advertising content, and are answerable to Ofcom. Ofcom can issue fines or revoke broadcast licences if necessary.

== Licensing ==
In the United Kingdom and the Crown dependencies (though not the British Overseas Territories), a television licence is required to receive any publicly broadcast television service, or for using BBC iPlayer. This includes the commercial channels, cable and satellite transmissions, Internet-streamed channels, and applies regardless of the technology used to view. The money from the licence fee is used to provide radio, television and Internet content for the BBC, Welsh-language television programmes for S4C, monitoring of global mass media, nine orchestras and performing groups, technical research, and contributions to broadband roll out. The fee is classified as a hypothecated tax rather than a subscription. The BBC gives the following figures for expenditure of licence fee income per month in 2021/2022:

Spend per month per licence	Percentage	Purpose
£7.29	55%	Television
£2.09	16%	Radio
£1.27	10%	BBC Online
£1.30	10%	BBC World Service
£0.72	5%	Other services and production costs
£0.58	4%	Licence fee collection and pension deficit cost

== Production ==
As of 2002, 27,000 hours of original programming are produced year in the UK television industry, excluding news, at a cost of £2.6bn. Ofcom has determined that 56% (£1.5bn) of production is in-house by the channel owners, and the remainder by independent production companies. Ofcom is enforcing a 25% independent production quota for the channel operators, as stipulated in the Broadcasting Act 1990.

=== In-house production ===
ITV plc, the company which owns 12 of the 15 regional ITV franchises, has set its production arm ITV Studios a target of producing 75% of the ITV schedule, the maximum allowed by Ofcom. This would be a rise from 54% at present, as part of a strategy to make ITV content-led chiefly to double production revenues to £1.2bn by 2012. ITV Studios currently produces programmes such as Coronation Street and Emmerdale.

In contrast, the BBC has implemented a Window of Creative Competition (WOCC), a 25% proportion over and above the 25% Ofcom quota in which the BBC's in-house production and independent producers can compete. The BBC produces shows such as All Creatures Great and Small and F***off I'm a Hairy Woman.

Channel 4 commissions all programmes from independent producers.

=== Independent production ===
As a consequence of the launch of Channel 4 in 1982, and the 25% independent quota from the Broadcasting Act 1990, an independent production sector has grown in the UK. Notable companies include Talkback Thames, Endemol UK, Hat Trick Productions, and Tiger Aspect Productions. A full list can be seen here: Category:Television production companies of the United Kingdom

== History ==
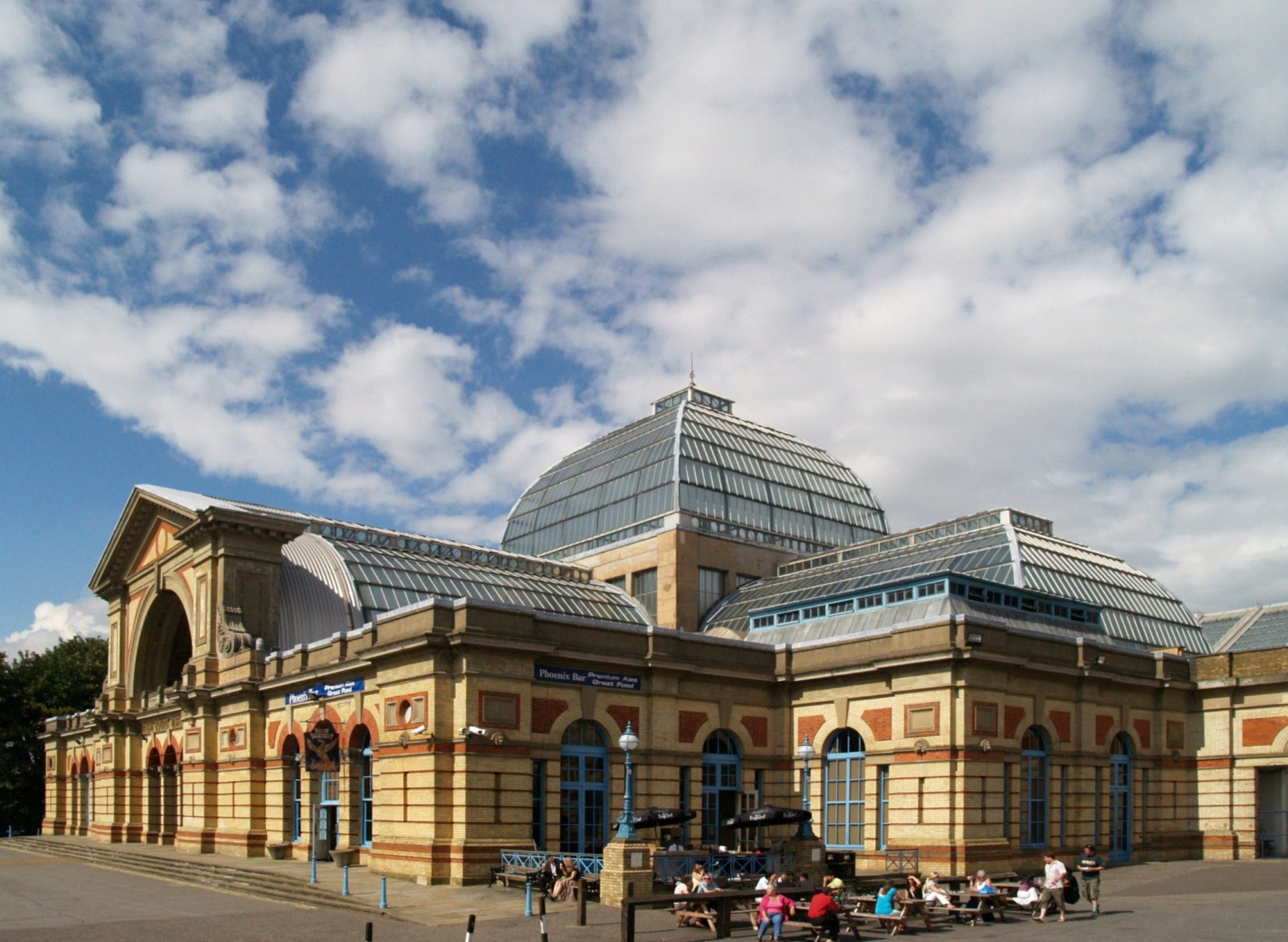
Alexandra Palace, the headquarters of the BBC Television Service from 1936

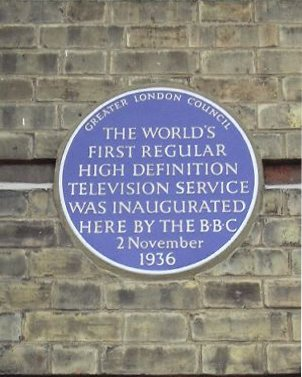
A plaque at Alexandra Palace commemorating the birthplace of generally receivable television. Here, 'high definition' refers to the 405-line television system rather than modern-day high-definition.

=== Timeline ===
1932	Mechanical analogue terrestrial	Following mechanical television test transmissions starting in 1926, the first official BBC television broadcast is made.
1936	Analogue terrestrial	The BBC launches electronic television broadcasts, the BBC Television Service, from Alexandra Palace. The picture format is monochrome, 405-line, and the transmission analogue terrestrial VHF. The service rebrands to BBC TV in 1960.
1938	Analogue cable	Community Antenna TV launches in Bristol and Kingston upon Hull, the UK's first cable services, distributing the 405 line service
1939	Analogue TV	The BBC Television Service ceases from September 1939 to June 1946, during World War II
1955	Regulation	The Independent Television Authority (ITA) is appointed to oversee the creation of ITV by the Television Act 1954
1955	Analogue terrestrial	Independent Television, the UK's second channel, begins when Associated-Rediffusion, the first ITV franchise, launches. ITV is initially arranged as 14 regional franchises, with three of these (London, Midlands and North) being further split into weekday and weekend franchises. The franchisees launch between September 1955 and September 1962, the franchise holders being Associated-Rediffusion, Associated TeleVision (holds two franchises, ATV London and ATV Midlands), ABC Weekend TV (two franchises, ABC Midlands and ABC North), Granada Television, Scottish Television, Television Wales and the West, Southern Television, Tyne Tees Television, Anglia Television, Ulster Television, Westward Television, Border Television, Grampian Television, Channel Television and Wales (West and North) Television
1964	Analogue terrestrial	BBC2 launches, in a higher definition 625-line format (576i). As it is broadcast in UHF frequencies and a different format, owners of 405 line TVs are unable to receive it. Simultaneously, BBC TV rebrands to BBC1
1960s	Analogue cable	Rediffusion Vision start a 625-line cable service
1966	Programming	The 1966 World Cup Final broadcasts on BBC1 and ITV, with 32.3 million viewers in total making it the most watched broadcast
1967	Analogue terrestrial	Colour transmissions begin on BBC2 using the PAL format
1968	Analogue terrestrial	The ITA made changes to the ITV franchises: the weekday/weekend split for the Midlands and North franchises is removed, but the North was split into North West and Yorkshire. From 1968, Telefusion Yorkshire held the new Yorkshire franchise. Thames Television was created for the London weekday franchise, formed from ABC and Rediffusion. London Weekend Television replaced the London weekend franchise holder, ATV.
1968	Analogue terrestrial	The ITV Emergency National Service replaces the regional ITV network for several weeks in August 1968, due to strike action as a consequence of the implementation of the franchise changes, with an on-air name of 'Independent Television'
1969	Analogue terrestrial	Colour transmissions begin on BBC1 and ITV
1969	Programming	The Apollo 11 moon landing broadcasts on BBC1, BBC2 and ITV, listed as the Greatest TV Moment in a 1999 list compiled by Channel 4
1972	Regulation	The Sound Broadcasting Act 1972 reconstitutes the ITA as the Independent Broadcasting Authority
1972	Analogue cable	Licences issued for experimental community cable channels in Bristol, Greenwich, Sheffield, Swindon and Wellingborough
1974	Analogue terrestrial	Ceefax and ORACLE, the UK's first teletext services, launch
1975	Programming	Fawlty Towers firsts broadcasts, listed as the Greatest British Television Programme in a list compiled by the British Film Institute in 2000
1979	Analogue terrestrial	Almost all ITV broadcasts and production ceased due to a 10-week industrial dispute. When programming resumed on 24 October, there was a lack of original programming, so ITV showed repeats of 3-2-1. Original programming resumes two and a half months later
1982	Analogue terrestrial	ITV franchise changes took effect: Central Independent Television was created from a restructured ATV. Television South (TVS) replaced Southern Television. Television South West (TSW) replaced Westward Television. A new national ITV franchise is created for breakfast television, and awarded to TV-am
1982	Analogue terrestrial	Launch of Channel 4 and S4C, the UK's second and third independent channels. S4C broadcast to Wales, and Channel 4 the remainder of the country. The ITV companies sold Channel 4's airtime until the end of 1992. ITV and Channel 4 cross-promoted each other's programmes until 1998.
1983	Analogue terrestrial	Launch of breakfast television on both BBC1 and ITV.
1985	Analogue terrestrial	The final transmissions of the two-station analogue terrestrial VHF transmissions cease on 3 January
1986	Analogue terrestrial	The BBC launches a full daytime service with BBC1 being on air from 6 am until midnight every day for the first time.
1987	Analogue terrestrial	ITV launches its first formalised morning schedule. This became possible following the transfer of schools programmes to Channel 4.
Late 1980s	Analogue cable	Issue of franchises to local cable operators, most of which will eventually merge to become Virgin Media. WightFibre and Wrights Radio Relay remain independent
1989	Analogue satellite	Sky launches, a subscription satellite service, with pay-per-view movies and events
1990	Regulation	The Broadcasting Act 1990 abolishes the Independent Broadcasting Authority and Cable Authority and replaces them with the Independent Television Commission. The Act makes mergers between ITV franchises possible – the regional franchises will ultimately consolidate to ITV plc (holds 13 franchises) and STV Group (2 franchises). Most Franchises that would ultimately be owned by ITV plc adopt the ITV1 brand in 2001, and drop regional identity in 2002. The two STV Group franchises standardise on the STV brand in 2006, with Channel Television taking on the ITV1 brand despite being independent of ITV plc at that time.
1990	Analogue satellite	BSB launches, a subscription 5-channel satellite service
1991	Analogue terrestrial	Two ITV regions and Channel 4 broadcast stereo sound transmissions using NICAM, with the rest of the ITV network following in the next couple of years. The BBC launches NICAM stereo broadcasting on 31 August, having started test transmissions in 1986
1992	Analogue satellite	After merging with Sky, BSkyB ceases transmissions on BSB's old satellite
1992	Programming	Ghostwatch broadcasts on BBC1, listed as the Most Controversial TV Moment in a 2005 list compiled by Channel 4. The programme had 2,215 complaints following the broadcast
1993	Analogue terrestrial	ITV franchise changes take effect: Westcountry Television replaced Television South West; Carlton Television replaced Thames Television; Meridian Broadcasting replaced Television South; Good Morning Television replaced TV-am; Teletext Ltd replaced ORACLE, the national teletext franchise holder
1997	Analogue terrestrial	Channel 5 launches; it is the UK's first terrestrial broadcaster to also launch on Sky
1998	Digital satellite	BSkyB launches SkyDigital, now marketed as Sky TV, the UK's first digital satellite service. Unlike the analogue service, it includes an Electronic Programme Guide, interactive TV and text services, widescreen picture format from certain channels (16:9), audio description and near video-on-demand pay-per-view movie channels. This also sees the BBC, Channel 4 and S4C to broadcast via satellite for the first time; as such, Channel 4 becomes available in Wales, and a new Welsh-only version of S4C broadcasts nationally. The BBC is initially encrypted and non-regional; it will drop encryption and launch regional variations from May 2003. ITV will not join SkyDigital until October 2001. SkyDigital launches with around 200 TV or radio channels
1998	Digital terrestrial	Launch of OnDigital, a subscription digital terrestrial service
1998	Digital cable	NTL, Telewest and Cable & Wireless begin digital cable services with similar characteristics to Sky Digital. Unlike Sky Digital, cable remains a regional service, carrying all versions of BBC channels and ITV
1999	IPTV	Kingston Interactive Television (KIT), the UK's first IPTV service, launches in Hull. It is the UK's first video on demand service. The BBC previously demonstrated the concept of watching video on demand via the information superhighway in an episode of Tomorrow's World in 1994.
2001	Analogue satellite	BSkyB ceases its analogue satellite service
2002	Digital terrestrial	Closure of ITV Digital (né OnDigital)
2002	Digital terrestrial	Launch of Freeview, a free digital terrestrial service to replace ITV Digital
2003	Regulation	The Communications Act 2003 abolishes the Independent Television Commission and replaces it with Ofcom
2004	Digital terrestrial	Launch of Top Up TV, a subscription service on digital terrestrial
2006	Cable	Merger of NTL and Telewest; they will later merge with Virgin Mobile and relaunch as Virgin Media
2006	Cable	The UK's first public high-definition broadcasts, as BBC and ITV show the 2006 FIFA World Cup in high-definition via NTL:Telewest
2006	IPTV	Kingston Communications cease KIT
2006	IPTV	Launch of BT Vision, a subscription video on demand service combined with a Freeview receiver. It rebranded to BT TV in 2013, then EE TV in 2023 and reversed in 2026
2006	Internet television	BSkyB launches Sky Anytime, a program to download television shows to PCs via the Internet, for subscribers to Sky TV. It later rebrands to Sky Go
2006	Internet television	Channel 4 launches 4 on Demand, allowing free and paid-for downloads via the Internet of television shows. It later rebrands to All 4, and rebrands once more, in 2023, to Channel 4, with the app bearing the same name as the channel
2007	Internet television	ITV relaunch itv.com as an on-demand portal. It later rebrands to ITVX
2007	Analogue terrestrial	The digital switchover begins as a consequence of switching off analogue terrestrial UHF transmissions
2007	Internet television	The BBC launches BBC iPlayer, a tool for watching BBC programmes online
2008	Digital satellite	Freesat launches, a free satellite television service
2011	Internet television	Lovefilm Instant, a streaming TV service, launches in December. It will later be integrated with Amazon's website and rebrand as Prime Video.
2012	Internet television	Netflix launches their streaming TV service in the UK,
2012	Internet Television	Sky launch NOW TV, a subscription Internet TV service containing similar content to Sky's satellite service but without a contract. It later rebrands to Now
2012	Digital terrestrial/Internet television	YouView launches, a hybrid set-top-box for receiving terrestrial and Internet TV services. In July 2023, YouView stopped marketing itself to consumers, but continues as a technology platform used in certain televisions and set-top-boxes
2012	Analogue terrestrial	Analogue terrestrial UHF transmissions cease in all regions, with Northern Ireland being the last region to close analogue broadcasts
2013	Analogue cable	Virgin Media closes its last analogue cable areas
2015	Digital terrestrial/Internet television	Freeview Play launches, a hybrid set-top-box combining terrestrial and Internet TV services
2017	Analogue cable	Wrights Radio Relay closes the analogue and digital cable TV service in Newtown, Powys, which is the UK's last public analogue TV service
2019	Internet television	BritBox launches, a subscription streaming service founded by the BBC and ITV plc. In 2022, it merges into ITVX
2022	Internet television	Sky Glass launches, a TV which receives all content via the Internet instead of Sky's satellite distribution. It's joined in 2022 by Sky Stream, an Internet-connected device with the same service
2022	Internet television	Stream from Virgin Media launches, a TV service which receives all content as data via Virgin's broadband connection. Like their older cable TV service, access is limited to Virgin's cable network. It later rebrands to Flex.

=== Closed and aborted television providers ===
Provider	Years	Free or pay	No. of channels	Colour	Digital	VOD	Transmission
VHF terrestrial TV	1936–1985	Free	2	No	No	No	Analogue terrestrial
405-line cable service	1938–1985	Free	2	No	No	No	Analogue cable
UHF terrestrial TV	1965–2012	Free	5 (or 6)	Yes	No	No	Analogue terrestrial
Multiple cable services	1970s–2017	Free and pay	Unknown	Yes	No	No	Analogue cable
Sky [analogue]	1989–2001	Pay	Unknown	Yes	No	No	Analogue satellite
BSB	1990–1992	Pay	5	Yes	No	No	Analogue satellite
OnDigital / ITV Digital	1998–2002	Pay	Unknown	Yes	Yes	No	Digital terrestrial
KIT	1999–2006	Pay	Unknown	Yes	Yes	Yes	IPTV
Top Up TV	2004–2013	Pay	Unknown	Yes	Yes	No	Digital terrestrial
Freewire	2006–2014	Pay	50	Yes	Yes	No	IPTV
EE TV (Note: Refers to the TV service launched by EE before it was acquired by BT, and is separate from the BT TV service which rebranded to EE TV in 2023 and reversed in 2026)	2014–2021	Pay	99	Yes	Yes	Yes	Digital terrestrial + IPTV
Plusnet TV	2015–2021	Pay	95	Yes	Yes	Yes	Digital terrestrial + IPTV

The following Internet TV services have closed:

Service	Years
Blinkbox / TalkTalk TV Store	2007–2018
SeeSaw	2010–2011
UTV Player	2014–2016
BBC Store	2015–2017

The following services were aborted before launch:

- Sky Picnic, a proposed subscription digital terrestrial service from Sky in 2007
- 'Project Kangaroo', an Internet TV service announced by the BBC, ITV and Channel 4 in 2007. Some of the technology was reused in SeeSaw. A similar concept later launched as BritBox.

==== Analogue terrestrial television ====
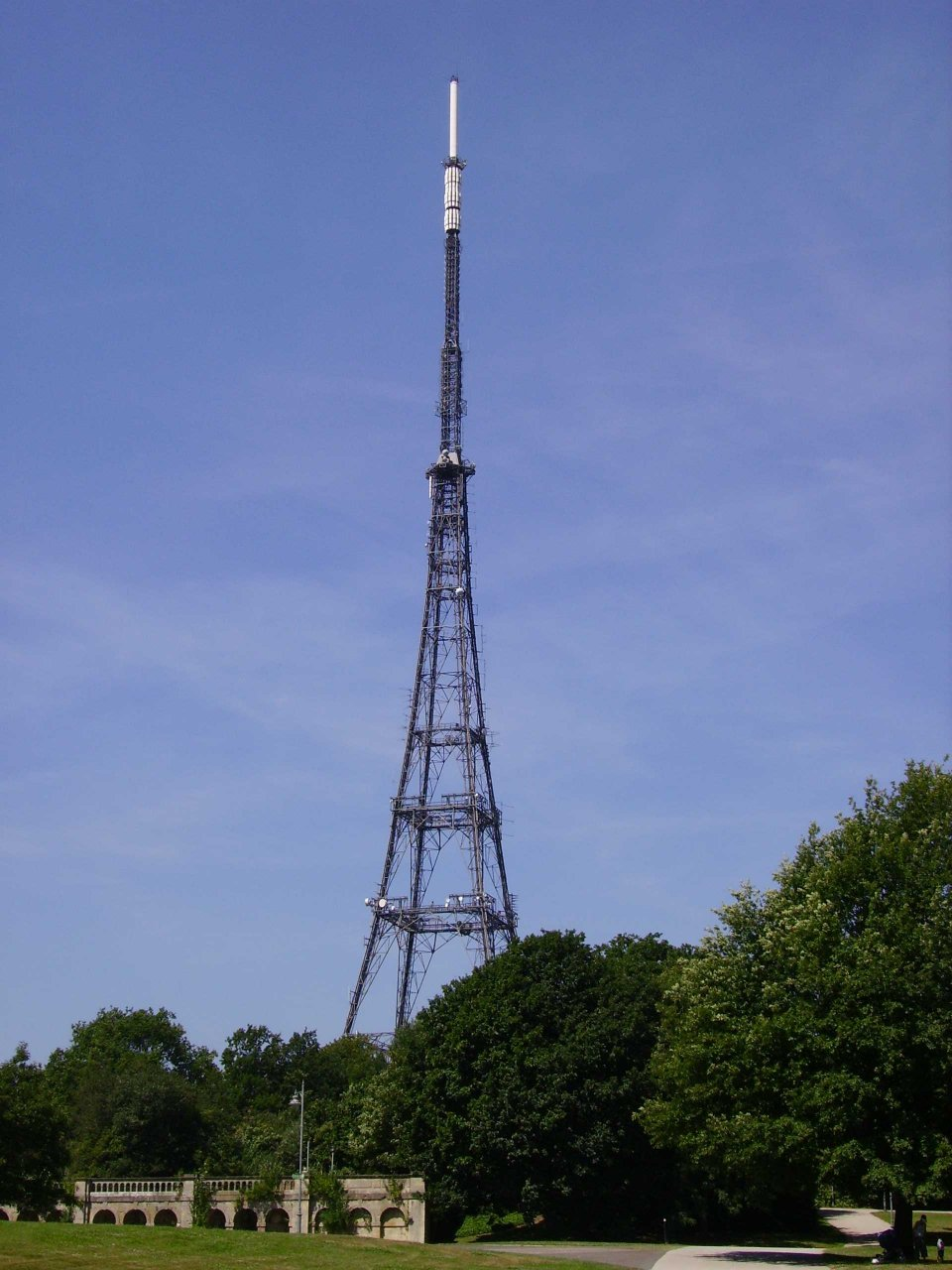
Crystal Palace transmitter. Constructed in 1956, it is the main transmitter for Greater London.

UK digital switchover dates

Analogue TV was transmitted via VHF (1936) and later UHF (1964) radio waves, with analogue broadcasts ending in 2012.

VHF transmissions started in 1936 and closed in 1985 (with a gap 1939–1946), carrying two channels. The launch channel was the BBC Television Service, known as BBC1 since 1964. This was joined by Independent Television, a network of regional franchises launching between 1955 and 1962. The channels transmitted in monochrome using the 405-line television system, with 376 visible lines, at 25 interlaced frames per second (50 fields per second), initially with an aspect ratio of 5:4, switching to 4:3 in 1950. The phased closure started in 1982 and completed in January 1985.

UHF transmissions started in 1964 and closed in 2012. The launch channel was BBC2. This would be joined by BBC1, the ITV network, Channel 4 or S4C in Wales, Channel 5 as well as a network of local TV channels. Transmissions started using the System I standard, a 625-line monochrome picture, with 576 visible lines, at 25 interlaced frames/second (50 fields/second) and a 4:3 aspect ratio. Technical advancements included colour (1967), teletext (1974), and stereo sound (1991). The drive to switch viewers from analogue to digital transmissions was a regional process called the digital switchover, which started in 2007 and completed in October 2012 when analogue UHF transmissions ceased in Northern Ireland.

Whilst there are no longer any analogue broadcasts in the UK, a PAL signal may be present in closed RF distribution systems, e.g. a video feed from an intercom in a block of flats, or a security system.

Common channel position	Channel name	Channel owner	Regions (Note: The region counts shown are for the channel overall, and do not account for regions which have undergone digital switch-over and hence are digital-only)	VHF launch date	UHF launch date
1	BBC One	BBC	18 regional variations	2 November 1936	15 November 1969
2	BBC Two	BBC	4 regional variations (Note: Count of BBC Two analogue regional variations)	N/A	20 April 1964
3	ITV (on-air brand ITV1, STV or UTV; legal name Channel 3)	ITV Network Ltd (ITV plc, STV Group)	17 regional variations (14 ITV, 2 STV, UTV); 24 advertising regions; 13 Teletext regions	From 22 September 1955 – 14 September 1962	15 November 1969
4 (English regions, Scotland and Northern Ireland)	Channel 4	Channel Four Television Corporation	6 advertising regions	N/A	2 November 1982
4 (Wales)	S4C	S4C Authority	1 region	N/A	1 November 1982
5	Channel 5	Viacom International Media Networks Europe	4 advertising regions	N/A	30 March 1997
6	Restricted television service licence channels	Various	18 channels (approx)	N/A	From Oct 1998

=== Defunct channels ===
There are nearly 200 defunct British channels. For a list, see List of former TV channels in the UK or Category:Defunct television channels in the United Kingdom.

=== Commentary ===
==== The rise of television in the UK ====
The British Broadcasting Corporation (BBC) was established in 1927 to develop radio broadcasting, and inevitably became involved in TV in 1936. The BBC is funded by income from a "Broadcast Receiving Licence" purchased by UK residents. The cost of this is set by agreement with the UK Government.

Television caught on in the United Kingdom in 1947, but its expansion was slow. By 1951, with only two transmitters, near London and Birmingham, only 9% of British homes owned a television set with 1.5 million viewers by 1952. The United Kingdom was the first country in the world to have a regular daily television schedule direct to homes, and it was the first to have technical professions to work on TVs.

Commercial television was first broadcast in the United Kingdom in 1955 through Independent Television's London franchise, Associated-Rediffusion. Unlike the US, there was a distinct split between advertisements and programming. Advertisers purely purchased spots within pre-defined breaks within programming, and had no connection to the programme content. The content and nature of adverts was strictly controlled by the Independent Television Authority (ITA), the body controlling commercial television.

By the summer of 1957, Independent Television (ITV) had reached 85% of the country, and the TV audience had grown to 7 million. When all the ITV franchises had launched by 1962, the audience had grown to 12 million.

Up until 1972, television broadcasting hours were tightly regulated by the British government, under the control of the Postmaster General. Before the launch of ITV, the BBC was restricted by law to just five hours maximum of television in a day. This was increased at the launch of the commercial channel ITV to a 7-hour broadcasting day for both channels. Gradually the number of hours were increased. Typically, during the late 1960s, the law regulated a 50-hour broadcasting week for all television channels in the UK. This that meant BBC1, BBC2 and ITV could only broadcast normal programming for 7 hours a day from Mondays to Fridays, and 7.5 hours a day on Saturdays and Sundays.

Until 1957, television in the United Kingdom could not air from 6.00 pm to 7.00 pm. This was called the "Toddlers' Truce", in which the idea was that parents could put their children to bed before primetime television would commence; this restriction was lifted in 1957. However, on Sundays, television remained off the air from 6.00 pm to 7.00 pm. This was in response to religious leaders' fears that television would interfere with people attending church services. In 1958, a compromise was reached, in which only religious programming could be aired during this time slot. The restriction was lifted in January 1972.

The Postmaster General allowed exemptions to the regulations. All schools programming, adult education, religious programming, state occasions, political broadcasts and Welsh language programming were totally exempt from the restrictions. Sport and outside broadcasting events were given a separate quota of broadcasting hours which could be used in a year, starting off at 200 hours a year in the mid-1950s, rising to a quota of 350 hours a year by the late 1960s. Broadcasting on Christmas Eve, Christmas Day, Boxing Day, New Year's Eve and New Year's Day was also exempt from the tightly controlled restrictions.

The election of a Conservative government in June 1970 brought in changes to the control of broadcasting hours. At first, the typical broadcasting day was extended to 8 hours a day, with an increase in exemptions over Christmas, and an increase in the sport/outside broadcasting quota. On 19 January 1972, the then Minister for Posts and Telecommunications, Christopher Chataway, announced to the British House of Commons that all restrictions on broadcasting hours on television would be lifted from that day, with the broadcasters allowed to set their own broadcasting hours from then on. By November 1972, a full daytime schedule had been launched on ITV from 9.30 am each day, with the BBC also expanding their schedules to include more daytime programming.

The UK Government previously appointed people to the BBC's Board of Governors, a body responsible for the general direction of the organisation, and appointment of senior executives, but not its day-to-day management. From 2007, the BBC Trust replaced the Board of Governors. It is operationally independent of BBC management and external bodies, and aims to act in the best interests of licence fee payers.

==== History of satellite television ====
The first commercial direct-broadcast satellite (DBS, also known as direct-to-home) service in the United Kingdom, Sky Television, was launched in 1989 and used the newly launched Astra satellite at 19.2° east, providing four analogue TV channels. The channels and subsequent VideoCrypt video encryption system used the existing PAL broadcast standard, unlike the winner of the UK state DBS licence, British Satellite Broadcasting (BSB).

In 1990, BSB launched, broadcasting five channels (Now, Galaxy, The Movie Channel, The Power Station and The Sports Channel) in D-MAC format and using the EuroCypher video encryption system which was derived from the General Instruments VideoCipher system used in the USA. One of the main selling points of the BSB offering was the Squarial, a flat plate antenna and low-noise block converter (LNB). Sky's system used conventional and cheaper dish and LNB technology.

The two companies competed over the UK rights to movies. Sky operated from an industrial park in Isleworth in Greater London, whereas BSB had newly built offices in London (Marco Polo House). The two services subsequently merged to form British Sky Broadcasting (BSkyB). BSB's D-MAC/EuroCypher system was gradually replaced with Sky's VideoCrypt video encryption system.

In 1994, 17% of the group was floated on the London Stock Exchange (with ADRs listed on the New York Stock Exchange), and Rupert Murdoch's News Corporation owns a 35% stake.

By 1998, following the launch of several more satellites to Astra's 19.2° east position, the number of channels had increased to around 60 and BSkyB launched the first subscription-based digital television platform in the UK, offering a range of 300 channels broadcast from Astra's new satellite, at 28.2° east position under the brand name Sky Digital. BSkyB's analogue service has now been discontinued, with all customers having been migrated to Sky Digital.

In May 2008, a free-to-air satellite service from the BBC and ITV was launched under the brand name Freesat, carrying a variety of channels from Astra 28.2°E, including some content in HD formats.

== See also ==
=== Industry bodies ===
- Broadcasting, Entertainment, Cinematograph and Theatre Union (BECTU), National Union of Journalists (NUJ) and Equity, trade unions for members of the broadcasting industry
- Clearcast, performs clearance of television advertising copy and the final advertisements. Replaced the Broadcast Advertising Clearance Centre (BACC) on 1 January 2008
- Culture, Media and Sport Select Committee, a select committee of the House of Commons of the United Kingdom, established in 1997, which oversees the Department for Culture, Media and Sport (DCMS), the government department responsible for broadcasting in the UK
- Digital TV Group (DTG), an industry association for digital television, formed in 1995
- Everyone TV (formerly Digital UK), the body in charge of digital switchover of television in the UK
- Producers Association for Cinema and Television
- Royal Television Society (RTS), a society for the discussion, analysis and preservation of television in all its forms, past, present and future, which formed in 1927
- United Kingdom Independent Broadcasting (UKIB), an affiliation of independent production companies and broadcasters, representing non-BBC interests in the European Broadcasting Union

=== Genres and programming ===
- Ofcom Code on Sports and Other Listed and Designated Events, regulatory rules devised in 1997 which ensure particular sporting events are available for free via terrestrial television
- Sports broadcasting contracts in the United Kingdom
- British sitcom
- Light entertainment
- Category:British television-related lists
  - List of American television series based on British television series
  - List of British television programmes based on American television series
  - List of films based on British television series
  - List of films based on British sitcoms
  - List of BBC Radio programmes adapted for television, and of television programmes adapted for radio
  - List of UK game shows
  - List of longest-running UK television series

=== Miscellaneous ===
- Appreciation Index (AI), a score between 0 and 100 which measures the public's approval of a particular programme, which can be used to measure attitudes to programmes with small or niche audiences
- Broadcast, a weekly trade magazine for the broadcast industry
- Edinburgh International Television Festival, an annual industry gathering in Edinburgh
- Public service broadcasting in the United Kingdom, broadcasting intended for public benefit rather than purely commercial concerns
- Public information film, government commissioned short films usually shown during television advertising breaks
- Listings and general television magazines Radio Times, Soaplife, TV & Satellite Week, TV easy, TV Quick, TVTimes, What's on TV
