= Analogue television in the United Kingdom =

Analogue television in the United Kingdom includes terrestrial, satellite and cable services that were broadcast using analogue television signals. Following the termination of Virgin Media's analogue cable television service in Milton Keynes in November 2013, all television in the United Kingdom is broadcast in digital only.

== Terrestrial ==
Analogue terrestrial television in the United Kingdom was, traditionally, the method most people in the UK, Channel Islands and the Isle of Man used to receive television. It was phased out and replaced by digital terrestrial television between 2007 and 2012 on a region-by-region basis. Before the switchover, some people struggled to receive the digital transmissions as power levels were very low from some transmitters.

== Satellite ==
When Direct-To-Home satellite broadcasting first came to the UK at the end of the 1980s, there was competition between Sky Television and BSB, each which used competing technologies. Sky used the already common PAL picture format, and utilised space on the Astra 19.2°E Pan-European cluster of satellites, whereas BSB used D-MAC carrier modulation, a bespoke system designed by the Independent Broadcasting Authority (IBA). Alongside this, at the heart of the BSB advertising campaign was the 'Squarial', a diamond-shaped flat Satellite antenna, much smaller and (supposedly) aesthetically pleasing to the eye, unlike the 80CM dishes that were supplied by Sky. By developing such a bespoke system, BSB was significantly more expensive than Sky Television's satellite offering, and sign-up rates to BSB were low. Only 6 months after BSB's launch, the two companies merged to form British Sky Broadcasting, moving all customers to the cheaper, but inferior Astra and PAL system.

In more recent times, BSkyB, launched a digital service (called Sky Digital) in October 1998 based on DVB-S. This allowed many more channels and was marketed with a smaller dish. Take-up was very quick and successful, and Sky discontinued the former analogue service in June 2001 – just two-and-a-half years after digital satellite was launched, although some of the channels which had been part of their package, such as CNN and CNBC Europe, have continued broadcasting unaffected by Sky's departure.

It was originally planned for the analogue switch-off to occur on 31 December 2002, but this was achieved 15 months earlier. The last three channels, Sky Premier, Sky One and Sky Sports 2, were switched off at 00:01 on 28 September 2001. Sky analogue equipment could still pick up German channels until 30 April 2012 when they were shut down.

== Cable ==
Cable also broadcasts using standard (PAL) signals though often scrambled to prevent people watching the channels without paying a subscription.

Cable has not fully transitioned to the digital format (DVB-C) as some parts of the physical cable network are not suitable for transmitting the digital signals.

In most analogue cable TV areas, customers received a letter from Virgin Media offering a free switch to their digital TV service. If the customer chose not to migrate to digital, they would've lost all TV channels when the switch off occurred.

Customers with the cable feed plugged directly into their TV or have an RF bypass installed, which allows them to watch the analogue terrestrial channels independent of their set-top box, will also cease to receive channels when the analogue signal is switched off. Customers will still be able to receive channels via their digital set-top box. In some parts of the network where digital cable is available, analogue transmissions have been ceased in order that the bandwidth may be used for more data for the digital platform, in others both systems run alongside each other, though often new channels will launch on digital at the expense of channels on the older analogue network, which encourages those users to switch.

A TV that is capable of tuning frequencies used for cable is required for watching, plus note that no channels are receivable in Ex- NTL & Ex-Telewest areas as Virgin Media have stopped their analogue television in these areas.

=== Milton Keynes ===
In Milton Keynes, there has been a cable network ownership dispute between BT and Virgin Media for a decade. Milton Keynes was designated as a new town in 1967 and benefited by having the UK's first ever analogue cable television networks, owned by BT. In the 1990s, EU competition forced BT to sell/lease the service to NTL (later becoming Virgin Media). Since then, BT and Virgin have been unable to reach agreement on physical access, and as a result, Virgin Media are unable to offer digital cable TV in Milton Keynes.

In Milton Keynes in 2009, there were about 35 channels available on the analogue cable network, of which 18 were free-to-air. Account holder residents paid at least £4 monthly for TV, which included the following channels: BBC News, British Eurosport, Cartoon Network, CNBC, CNN, Discovery Channel, Discovery Real Time, Universal Channel, Movies 24, MTV, Film4, QVC and Yesterday. There were four optional add-on packs, which include channels: Challenge, Gold, Nickelodeon, VH1, Sky Living, Sky1, Comedy Central, TCM, Syfy, History, National Geographic and Sky News, which ranged from £5 to £13 extra per month.

From 28 November 2013, Virgin Media ceased to provide an analogue TV service in Milton Keynes.

Meanwhile, BT are re-using the cable TV ducting to run fibre optic broadband cabling as part of the FTTP trial in the town.

=== Westminster ===
Westminster in London had the same problem, where BT owned the cables. Residents are also unable to install satellite dishes due to constraints. BT's cables have insufficient bandwidth, so Virgin are unable to provide fibre optic services there, which in turn means no digital cable TV. For years, residents were waiting for digital cable TV to come, but finally on 8 August 2011, Virgin Media withdrew all its services in Westminster, including its analogue TV service. It was closed completely in January 2012. Now with satellite not allowed in the district and IPTV unable to get signals, the only option left is terrestrial television, like Freeview.
