= The Power Station (TV channel) =

Former British satellite music video television channel (1990–1991)

- Country: United Kingdom
- Headquarters: London, England

Ownership
- Owner: British Satellite Broadcasting (1990); BSkyB (1990–1991)
- Sister channels: The Movie Channel; The Sports Channel; Galaxy; Now; The Computer Channel

History
- Launched: 29 March 1990; 36 years ago
- Closed: 8 April 1991; 35 years ago
- Replaced by: Sky Movies

The Power Station was a British television channel that was operated by British Satellite Broadcasting (later British Sky Broadcasting, after BSB and Sky Television merged). It was a dedicated music channel.

== History ==
=== Programming ===
Power Up (weekdays at 7.00–9.00am) was the Power Station's breakfast show, hosted by Chris Evans.

Other main shows that include The Power Hour (weekdays at 12.00–1.00pm), The Carmen Ejogo Video Show (weekdays at 4.00–5.00pm), The Power Chart with Pat Sharp (weekdays at 5.00–6.00pm and Sundays at 4.00–5.00pm), Sushi TV (weekdays at 6.00–7.00pm) and Jonathan Coleman's Swing Shift (Monday to Thursday at 11.00pm–1.00am).

The channel also featured Boy George's weekly chat show Blue Radio, The Power Club, The Power Hour (a top ten show for example albums), Krush Rap, Rage (where DJ Elayne Smith presented funky rap, soul, acid house and funk), The Chart of Charts (a two-hour chart pick with indie, dance, metal and US music), and Power Haus (a 'headbangers' heaven'). Speakeasy featured jazz with rock music a feature of Raw Power.

Live concerts came from artists including the Inspiral Carpets, Belinda Carlisle, Jason Donovan, Jerry Lee Lewis and Phil Collins.

=== Merger and closure ===
On 2 November 1990, British Satellite Broadcasting and Sky Television merged, as well as Galaxy and Now channels being closed, but at first the Power Station survived, gaining a "British Sky Broadcasting" suffix on its logo.

The Power Station eventually ceased broadcasting at around 4.00am on 8 April 1991, with the final programme on the channel being an episode of Johnny Sokko and His Flying Robot, which was aired during Swing Shift. At 6.00am, channel 5 for BSB viewers became Sky Movies, a subscription-based channel and it was given free to BSB viewers for one month if they also subscribed to The Movie Channel.
