= The Computer Channel (BSB) =

Former computing-focused British television channel operated by BSB (1990)

Ownership
- Owner: Datavision (BSB)
- Sister channels: The Movie Channel; The Sports Channel; Galaxy; The Power Station; Now

History
- Launched: 28 June 1990; 35 years ago
- Closed: 29 November 1990 (154 days)

The Computer Channel was a British satellite television channel run by British Satellite Broadcasting (BSB) from 28 June to 29 November 1990.

The channel was broadcast on the same frequency as BSB's Sports Channel, while it was off-air in the mornings.

The Computer Channel was created to broadcast specialist training programmes for the computer industry. The Analysis programme covered IT news, interviews and reviews of new products. The editor and main presenter was Clive Couldwell, former editor of Which Computer magazine.

The channel was not for home viewing by the general public, and so was not promoted in most BSB advertising, or on their other channels. It was part of BSB's Datavision subsidiary, which offered encrypted television services and data reception to business users through BSB's domestic TV receivers.
