= Sky Television (1984–1990) =

Former British satellite television company; predecessor to BSkyB

Sky Television plc
- Type: Public limited company
- Industry: Media
- Founded: 16 January 1984
- Defunct: 2 November 1990
- Fate: Merged with British Satellite Broadcasting to form BSkyB
- Successor: British Sky Broadcasting
- Headquarters: London, England
- Key people: Brian Haynes; Rupert Murdoch; Andrew Neil
- Products: Pay TV services and programming
- Parent: News International; (News Corporation)

Sky Television plc was a British public limited company which operated a nine-channel satellite television service, launched by Rupert Murdoch's News International on 5 February 1989. Sky Television and its rival British Satellite Broadcasting suffered large financial losses, and merged on 2 November 1990 to form British Sky Broadcasting. A programming merger took effect on 1 December 1990.

== History ==
=== Development ===
Sky Television plc was originally Satellite Television Limited, a consortium set up by Brian Haynes in November 1980, backed by Guinness Mahon and Barclays Merchant Bank. Haynes was a former Thames Television journalist; he had produced a documentary titled "What's on the Satellite Tonight?" for TV Eye on 15 March 1979, which looked at Ted Turner and his satellite broadcasting operations in the United States from 1970 through the Turner Broadcasting System, an American media conglomerate (now Warner Bros. Discovery), and also at with how many European countries were developing the technology. Haynes soon realised that satellites could be the basis of a new kind of television broadcasting. He initially sought cooperation from Thames Television, the Independent Broadcasting Authority and an industry group, but their refusal resulted in him setting up SATV alone.

On 21 October 1981, SATV began test transmissions on the Orbital Test Satellite (OTS) after the European Space Agency allowed the company to test the satellite for the use of commercial television, with an hour of light entertainment in English every night. At first Malta was its official target, but it had a wide pan-European footprint. Broadcasts from the low-powered satellite were mostly only available to cable systems, for individual satellite dishes were too large and too costly for most consumers.

In the late 1960s, planning began for an experimental satellite which to broadcast TV in Europe. OTS was launched via Delta rocket (manufactured by McDonnell Douglas and Boeing, and launched by the United Launch Alliance) on 12 May 1978 for requisite testing of Europe's first commercial venture in telecommunications and television. Between 1978 and 1981, OTS used Ku-Band technology, evidencing its utility in the European market. Following the completion of its test programme, excess transponder capacity was leased to SATV. While governments in Britain and other European countries wrestled with the allocation of their channels, Satellite Television played a pioneering role, providing Europe's first satellite-delivered cable television service.

=== Satellite Television (Super Station Europe) ===
Satellite Television (also known as Super Station Europe on screen) began regular transmissions on 26 April 1982, becoming Europe's first-ever cable and satellite channel, originally broadcasting from OTS and aimed at cable operators all over Europe. Norway and Finland were the first two countries to permit the new service's transmission via cable, followed by Malta and Switzerland, and then West Germany. Originally it did not have a UK broadcasting licence, and consequently was in a similar legal situation to the pirate radio stations of the 1960s and 1970s; however, reception of the channel required a satellite dish approximately 10 feet (3 metres) wide, and it was believed that there were fewer than 50 privately owned installations.

The new channel broadcast many programmes from the archives of ITV companies such as LWT and Yorkshire Television; these included Please Sir!, Dickens of London, The Rag Trade, Within These Walls, Bouquet of Barbed Wire and Hadleigh. The channel gradually added some programmes it produced itself, such as the music show Cable Countdown hosted by BBC Radio 1 DJ Mike Read. Initially, the channel's own programming and continuity was played out from the Molinare studios at Fouberts Place in the West End of London.

Starting on 10 March 1983, the channel hoped to start broadcasting to the United Kingdom, aiming to prove the service could reach sufficient viewers to be profitable. However, the station struggled financially because of a limited audience, mainly due to the weak signal from OTS that made direct-to-home reception of the service extremely difficult. The channel had to rely on cable audiences, and was restricted to countries where receiving the channel via cable was legal. Transmission costs were also high. That same year, on 25 March, Rupert Murdoch had shown interest in the project and held talks with SATV's owners about buying a substantial stake in the company.

On 27 June 1983, the shareholders of Satellite Television agreed a £5 million offer to give News International 65% of the company. Murdoch described cable and satellite television as being "the most important single advance since Caxton invented the printing press" and saw it as a way to fulfil his long-held ambition of breaking into the British television industry. Eventually, Murdoch bought the remaining shares of the company, taking full control.

On 5 August 1983, Murdoch outlined plans which saw broadcasting hours extended to 5.50 pm to 10.30 pm daily with a mix of music, sport, news, comedy and films. Plans were also made to start broadcasting from the new European communications satellite ECS-1 and additional cable operators, allowing it to increase its audience across Europe and gain access to British viewers. By 16 October of that year, the station unofficially started broadcasting to the United Kingdom, to anyone that had Satellite dish.

=== Sky Channel ===
On 16 January 1984, Satellite Television Limited was renamed Sky Channel, as Rupert Murdoch and Jardin Owens put in new management. Swindon was the first area in the UK to start receiving the channel via its Cable operations before expended to many others Broadcast hours were extended by April and various English-language sports and entertainment shows were added to the schedule. These included new music programmes with Gary Davies, Linda de Mol, Pat Sharp, David "Kid" Jensen and Anthea Turner, such as Euro Top 40, and UK Top 50 Chart. The new management also sought to increase the number of cable households throughout Europe able to see the channel. Shortly after the relaunch, Swindon Cable became the first cable system in the United Kingdom to add the channel to its service on a permanent basis. In the Republic of Ireland, Sky Channel was added to cable systems from 1987 onwards.

Despite the programming changes resulting in increased viewership across Europe (from 291,470 in December 1983 to 4,003,000 in June 1985, before reaching 9,001,905 by April 1987), Sky Channel was still considered underperforming, generating under $20 million per year in advertising revenue. By the mid-1980s, Murdoch was looking to use newly emerging direct satellite broadcasting technology, and to focus primarily on the British market. Rather than paying for the rights to beam Sky's single-channel signal to cable providers, which in turn supplied the channel's programming to subscribers, direct satellite broadcasts meant multichannel programming could be provided directly to subscribers' homes via small satellite dish and decoder. In 1984, Sky began negotiations with TDF of France, with a view to using the company's planned high-powered satellites for direct-to-home broadcasting. However, nothing came of the negotiations.

In Britain (where cable television had not yet developed as much as in Central and Northern Europe), market research gave Sky a 13% audience share in cable homes, surpassing both BBC2 and Channel 4. Its children's programming (then the channel's most successful segment) had a share of 22.4%, similar to the figures for CBBC and CITV. A few of Sky's programmes, mainly World Wrestling Federation, managed to surpass both BBC1 and ITV among cable audiences. For all of its early life, the channel was a loss-making enterprise, losing £10 million in 1987. However, Murdoch had the financial resources to sustain the operation. The other main English-language pan-European cable and satellite television channel at the time, Super Channel, launched on 30 January 1987 by various ITV companies, was also loss-making.

=== Launch of Sky Television Network ===
Murdoch bid for an IBA satellite broadcasting license on 11 December 1986, but lost out to British Satellite Broadcasting, which announced plans to begin broadcasting in mid-1989 with three channels on satellite frequencies allotted to the United Kingdom by international agreement. Murdoch attempted to join the BSB consortium, but was rejected, spurring him to set up his own satellite service.

On 8 June 1988, Murdoch announced plans to expand Sky's service to four channels, creating the Sky Television Network, and that he planned to distribute the service throughout the United Kingdom by early 1989. Sky Channel and the other three channels would move to the pan-European Astra satellite system (leasing four transponders on Société Européenne des Satellites' RCA Astro-built satellite, Astra 1A, intended for direct-to-home reception), and the new network would concentrate on the United Kingdom.

By renting space on the Luxembourg-based Astra satellites, Murdoch circumvented British ownership laws. Using existing PAL broadcast technology, Sky Television began broadcasting four channels on 5 February 1989:

- An upgraded version of the original Sky Channel, renamed Sky One later on 31 July 1989
- Eurosport, a joint-venture between the European Broadcasting Union and News International
- Sky Movies, a film channel which became a subscription service on 5 February 1990
- Sky News, a 24-hour news and current affairs channel

Start-up costs reached £122 million; losses for its first year of operations were £95 million. Initially, Sky Channel's programming remained much the same (children's programmes, soaps and American action series), except for a number of new game shows and a few travel documentaries. One new programme was Sky by Day, a variation on ITV's more popular This Morning, hosted by ex-BBC Radio 1 DJ Tony Blackburn (who had moved to commercial radio by then) and ex-Magpie presenter Jenny Hanley. The show's mix of entertainment, gossip and fashion was noticeably low-budget and had low viewership. Prime-time broadcasts to European cable operators of Sky Channel were replaced by Eurosport, which was the only one of Sky's new channels officially aimed at a pan-European audience.

On 16 May 1989, Sky began giving away set-top boxes and dishes in a bid to increase customer numbers. Its joint venture with Disney collapsed at around the same time. Discussions about the venture had been taking place since November 1988, but Disney felt the 50:50 was no longer equal. Disney was supposed to start two channels, but when talks broke down, Sky initiated a lawsuit against Disney, claiming £1.5 billion in damages. The suit was later settled with Disney selling its stake to Sky, and agreeing to license its movie library for a five-year period on 3 June of that year.

=== Competition and merger ===
Murdoch's failure to win an IBA UK satellite television license was the impetus for Sky's relaunch. The new multichannel environment led to a ruinous battle for customers. Sky had the advantage of launching first, and leasing transponder space meant it was in the stronger position when Sky and BSB merged. By contrast, BSB was only licensed to broadcast five channels, had to pay for the construction and launch of its own satellites, and used more ambitious and expensive technology. Also it had higher capital expenditure overall, such as the construction of its Marco Polo House headquarters in London compared to Sky's industrial estate accommodation in Isleworth.

By 2 November 1990, Sky and BSB were struggling under the weight of massive losses and the companies merged, with Sky taking management control. The new company was called British Sky Broadcasting (marketed as "Sky"), its name composed from the three letters of BSB and the remainder from Sky. Marco Polo House was sold, BSB's channels largely scrapped in favour of Sky's, and the Marcopolo satellites were eventually sold, leaving the squarial obsolete. (Marcopolo 1 on 21 December 1993 to NSAB of Sweden and Marcopolo 2 on 1 July 1992 to Telenor of Norway).

=== Financial turnaround ===
BSkyB made heavy losses in its early years. To turn around the company's finances, New Zealand television executive Sam Chisholm was brought on board to manage the day-to-day operations and build the subscriber base, and the company moved into profit.

== Timeline ==
=== 1980s ===
- 1980
  - November – Satellite Television Limited is set up by Brian Haynes, backed by Guinness Mahon and Barclays Merchant Bank.
- 1981
  - 21 October – SATV begins test transmissions on the Orbital Test Satellite after the European Space Agency allowed it to be used for commercial television, and broadcast to cable systems rather than directly to individual dishes.
- 1982
  - 26 April – Satellite Television (SATV) launches as a pan-European network, whether the channel often referred on-screen as Super Station Europe is initially only available in Norway and Finland to permit the new service's transmission via cable followed by Malta, Switzerland and West Germany.
- 1983
  - 27 June – Rupert Murdoch's News International takes control of Satellite Television UK.
  - 16 October – SATV begins broadcasting in the United Kingdom and most of Western Europe via Satellite
- 1984
  - 16 January – Satellite Television Limited is renamed Sky Channel, and also began broadcasts on the Swindon Cable company in the UK. New original programmes are commissioned although mainly consist of various music and children's shows were included.
- 1986
  - 2 April – Granada, Anglia, Pearson, Virgin and Amstrad to form British Satellite Broadcasting and win Independent Broadcasting Authority UK satellite television franchise.
  - 11 December – BSB awarded licence from the IBA and complete over £200 million funding with additional shareholders Reed Elsevier, Chargeurs, London Merchant Securities and others.
- 1988
  - 8 June – Having failed to become part of the BSB consortium, Murdoch announces his intention to relaunch Sky Channel as Sky Television Network on the Astra satellite system.
  - 11 December – The satellite on which Sky Television was to broadcast, Astra 1A is successfully launched by communications company SES.
- 1989
  - 5 February – The four-channel Sky Television package launches at 6.00pm.
  - 3 June – Sky Television agrees with The Walt Disney Company to broadcast movies for a five-year period, this agreement comes a few weeks after plans to create a full-time service were scrapped, although a Disney-branded version eventually launched on 1 October 1995.
  - 31 July – Sky Channel becomes a United Kingdom and Ireland-only service and is renamed Sky One although for a short time after the relaunch, some of Sky Channel's former pan-European programming is broadcast in the hours before Eurosport's broadcasts, and the programme block is branded Sky Europe.

=== 1990s ===
- 1990
  - 5 February – Sky Movies is fully encrypted, becoming Sky's first pay channel.
  - 11 February – Sky Movies broadcasts its first special event – a boxing match between Mike Tyson and Buster Douglas.
  - 25–29 March – BSB launches on cable television, consisting of five channels: Galaxy, Now, The Movie Channel, The Sports Channel and The Power Station. BSB planned to launch in September 1989 but problems with the supply of receiving equipment led to six-month delay.
  - 29 April – BSB launches its satellite television service on the Marcopolo system.
  - 2 November – As both companies have been suffering heavy losses, they merge, forming British Sky Broadcasting. The new company announces that BSB customers will receive Sky equipment (for Astra system) free of charge, and the Marcopolo satellite transmissions will cease.
  - 2 December – Galaxy and Now are closed and are replaced on the Marcopolo satellite by Sky One and Sky News although arts programmes are shown for a short time as a weekend opt-out service.
- 1991
  - 6 May – Eurosport briefly closes after Screensport filed a complaint to the European Commission over its corporate structure. TF1 Group subsequently steps in to replace BSkyB as joint owners when the service resumed on 22 May.
- 1992
  - 1 July – BSB satellite Marcopolo 2 sold to Telenor of Norway.
  - 31 December – Sky stops broadcasting via the Marcopolo satellite.
- 1993
  - 21 December – BSB satellite Marcopolo 1 sold to NSAB of Sweden.

== Sources ==
=== Further reading ===
- "From Satellite to Single Market": New Communication Technology and European. Author: Richard Collins Publication Date: 24 Sep 1998 | ISBN 041517970X | ISBN 978-0415179706
- "High Above: The untold story of Astra, Europe's leading satellite company" Author: Chris Forrester ISBN 978-3642120084
- "Satellite television in Western Europe" Volume 1 of Acamedia research monographs, Author: Richard Collins ISBN 0861963881, 9780861963881
