= Now (British TV channel) =

Former British satellite television channel operated by BSB (1990)

- Logo of "Now"

Ownership
- Owner: British Satellite Broadcasting (later Sky)
- Sister channels: The Movie Channel; The Sports Channel; Galaxy; The Power Station; The Computer Channel

History
- Launched: 28 March 1990; 35 years ago
- Closed: 1 December 1990 (35 years ago)
- Replaced by: Sky News; Sky Arts

Now (referred to by some news outlets as The Now Channel) was a British television channel transmitted as part of the British Satellite Broadcasting service during 1990. The channel aired news and current affairs on weekdays and documentaries and arts programmes on weekends.

== History ==
The Now channel was originally designed to be a live 24-hour news channel similar to CNN and Sky News, with its content provided by ITN. Between the awarding of the franchise and the launch of the channel, ITN withdrew its involvement with BSB after failing to reach an agreement on how to provide its news service and the Now channel's remit was changed to a mix of daytime lifestyle shows, current affairs programming, and arts programmes at weekends. The channel was promoted under the slogan "The Channel For Living". Now was broadcast throughout BSB's short spell on air from March to December 1990 on the Marcopolo satellites.

On 2 November 1990, BSB merged with Sky to form British Sky Broadcasting, it was decided to streamline the channels available on both services. Now was replaced with Sky News, which Sky Television had broadcast on the Astra 1A satellite.

Now ceased broadcasting on Saturday 1 December 1990 at 1.00am – the first of the five BSB channels to close. As there were still arts programmes yet to be shown on Now, BSkyB broadcast Sky Arts as a weekend-only opt-out of the Sky News service on the Marcopolo satellite. Once all shows were broadcast, Sky Arts was closed, though the name itself eventually returned in March 2007 when the channel Artsworld, which was taken over by BSkyB in June 2005, was relaunched.

== Programming ==
Now featured a mix of talk and chat shows, documentaries, news, current affairs and arts programming. As with all of BSB's other channels, Now carried short BSB News bulletins throughout the day.

One of Now's most memorable programmes was Now Sir Robin fronted by ex-Question Time presenter Sir Robin Day, which later transferred to Sky News. The programme covered the week's political happenings and confrontations. Now broadcast a number of theatre and classical music performances during its short period on-air. Arts programming featured on most nights.

== Sky Arts (British Satellite Broadcasting) ==
Sky Arts
Programming
- Picture format: 4:3 (576i SDTV)

Ownership
- Owner: British Sky Broadcasting

History
- Launched: 2 December 1990
- Replaced: Now
- Closed: 31 December 1992
- Replaced by: Sky Soap; Sky Travel

Sky Arts was initially planned as a full channel on the Astra 1A satellite as part of the Sky Television service in 1989. Promotional material indicated the channel would launch later that year alongside the Disney Channel. However, the Disney Channel did not launch due to disputes with Sky, and arts programming (such as an early broadcast of the opera 'Carmen') was instead aired on Sky One.

After the merger of British Satellite Broadcasting (BSB) and Sky Television in 1990 to form British Sky Broadcasting (BSkyB), the Now channel was replaced by Sky News. Despite this, some shows intended for Now were still contracted, leading to occasional opt-outs from Sky News on the Marcopolo satellite (formerly owned by BSB), which carried Now. These opt-outs were branded as 'Sky Arts' and aired primarily for Marcopolo viewers. This service was exclusive to former BSB viewers and did not interrupt Sky News on the Astra satellite.

Once all outstanding programmes had aired, Sky News took over the Marcopolo and Astra satellites fully, and Sky Arts ceased broadcasting.
