= Galaxy (British TV channel) =

Former British general entertainment channel operated by BSB (1990)

Ownership
- Owner: British Satellite Broadcasting
- Sister channels: The Movie Channel; The Sports Channel; The Power Station; Now; The Computer Channel

History
- Launched: 26 March 1990; 36 years ago
- Closed: 2 December 1990; 35 years ago
- Replaced by: Sky One

Galaxy (referred to by some TV-focused websites as The Galaxy Channel) was a short-lived British satellite television channel, owned and operated by British Satellite Broadcasting.

The station, focused on general entertainment and children's programming, was one of the five BSB channels, based at the network's headquarters at Marco Polo House in Battersea.

Galaxy broadcast a mix of original programming, American imports and archive repeats from the BBC library. Its most infamous production was Heil Honey I'm Home, a sitcom about Adolf Hitler, and Eva Braun living as a couple in America with their Jewish neighbors, which aired only its pilot episode.

== History ==
=== Original programmes ===
Some of the programmes made for Galaxy included:

==== Jupiter Moon ====
Jupiter Moon was Galaxy's sci-fi soap opera, shown three times a week (on Mondays, Wednesdays, and Fridays at 6.30pm), with an omnibus at weekends. 150 episodes were made, but only the first 108 were broadcast by Galaxy before it closed, while the last 42 episodes would air six years later on the Sci Fi Channel. The cast included Richard Derrington, Anna Chancellor, Alison Dowling, Lucy Benjamin, Fay Masterson, Richard Lintern and Jason Durr. The entire series has been released on Region 1 DVD.

==== Up Yer News ====
This was Galaxy's topical satire show, which aired a 15-minute episode each weeknight. It featured Chris Morris, Armando Iannucci, Stewart Lee, Richard Herring, Patrick Marber, Steve Coogan, Rebecca Front, Doon Mackichan, David Schneider, Jon Thomson, Al Murray, Julian Clary, Stephen Fry, David Baddiel, Rob Newman, Steve Punt, Hugh Dennis, Henry Normal, Fred Harris, Jo Brand, Mark Heap, and Alistair McGowan.

==== The Happening ====
A weekly 90-minute music and comedy show presented by Jools Holland.

==== I Love Keith Allen ====
I Love Keith Allen was a 30-minute comedy show, made by Noel Gay Television, which sees Keith Allen as various characters such as Larry 'Ringside' Lewis.

==== 31 West ====
Galaxy's showbiz magazine show broadcast each weeknight, 6.00–6.30pm, presented by Simon Potter, Debbie Flint and Shyama Perera and soap expert Chris Stacey. The show got its name from the placing of BSB's Marcopolo Satellite at 31 degrees west.

==== The Last Laugh ====
Stand-up comedy show. Comedians featured included Ben Elton, Nick Revell, Jack Dee, Kevin Day, Simon Fanshawe, Punt and Dennis, Norman Lovett, Mark Steel and Mark Thomas.

==== Corrigan & Womack ====
This was a comedy series, starring Bernadine Corrigan and Steve Womack, where they would perform comedy sketches. This show was carried over to Sky One following Galaxy's closure.

==== Doctor Who weekend ====
Galaxy broadcast early episodes of Doctor Who every week, and on the weekend of Saturday 22 and Sunday 23 September, the channel presented a complete weekend.
Saturday 22 September: 9.15am An Unearthly Child, 11.15am The Daleks (episodes 1–3), 12.35pm Doctor Who's Who's Who, 1.40pm The Daleks (episodes 4–7), 3.30pm The Edge of Destruction, 4.30pm The Yeti Rarities (The Abominable Snowmen episode 2 and The Web of Fear episode 1), 6.00pm The Space Museum, 8.00 The Keys of Marinus, 11.00pm The Aztecs, 1.00am Dr. Who and the Daleks (film).
Sunday 23 September: 9.15am The War Games (episodes 1–5), 11.30am Whose Doctor Who, 12.45pm The War Games (episodes 6–10), 3.00pm The Dominators, 5.45pm The Mind Robber, 8.00pm The Three Doctors, 10.00pm Daleks – Invasion Earth: 2150 A.D. (film), 11.30pm The Yeti Rarities (The Abominable Snowmen episode 2 and The Web of Fear episode 1), 12.30am The Edge of Destruction.
Between the stories, there were also many editions of BSB's own programme, 31 Who, presented by Debbie Flint, Shyama Perera and John Nathan-Turner, and featuring interviews with Sylvester McCoy, Carole Ann Ford, Elisabeth Sladen, Peter Purves, Wendy Padbury, Terrance Dicks, Bob Baker & Dave Martin, Nicholas Courtney, William Russell, Jon Pertwee, Frazer Hines, Deborah Watling and many more.

=== BBC programmes ===
The archive BBC programmes on Galaxy were:

- Doctor Who (occasional airings outside of the Galaxy Club strand)
- Secret Army
- The Goodies
- Steptoe and Son
- Dad's Army
- Porridge
- Till Death Us Do Part
- Are You Being Served?
- The Young Ones
- Target

=== American imports ===
The American programmes on Galaxy were:

- The Facts of Life
- Night Court
- The Outer Limits
- China Beach
- Murphy Brown
- Doctor Doctor
- Designing Women
- Hill Street Blues
- Parker Lewis Can't Lose
- The Young and the Restless
- The Bold and the Beautiful
- Hotel
- Naked City
- Mike Hammer
- Police Story
- Baby Boom

=== Galaxy Club ===
The station also broadcast children's programmes under the 'Galaxy Club' strand, which featured original programming, mixed with imported cartoons and series.

=== Logo ===
The Galaxy logo, along with all the BSB logos, has been critically acclaimed. On the TV Ark website, an archive of British television presentation history, Hayden Walker writes: "There is no doubt the BSB identity was a serious coherent design. The project of work stretched back over a year and included product designers, model makers, composers and other specialists. The BSB identities emerged with startling clarity, with an upmarket pitch. Stylish and distinctive both on screen and in print, Lambie-Nairn designed identities which told stories." And of the Galaxy logo in particular: "The ident had a lovely warmth to it, with animated swirls of colours and stars."

=== Galaxy archives ===
Apart from Jupiter Moon and many of Galaxy's imported programming, the vast majority of the original programming made for broadcast by Galaxy, such as Up Yer News and The Happening, is now missing. Most was made by various independent production companies, including Noel Gay Television, with both the broadcaster and production company deleting their master copies – each thinking the other will have kept theirs.

=== Closure ===
Following the merger of BSB and Sky, the decision was taken to hand over Galaxy's transponder to Sky One, who took only a few programmes from Galaxy and incorporated them into its channels line up. Galaxy closed down for the last time before 4.00am on 2 December 1990 after an airing of an episode of the Donald Pleasence House of Horror, ending with a clean playout of the main ident, which quickly zoomed out of vision, showing a black screen for a moment before fading to the station's test card.
