= Marco Polo House =

Former building in London, England

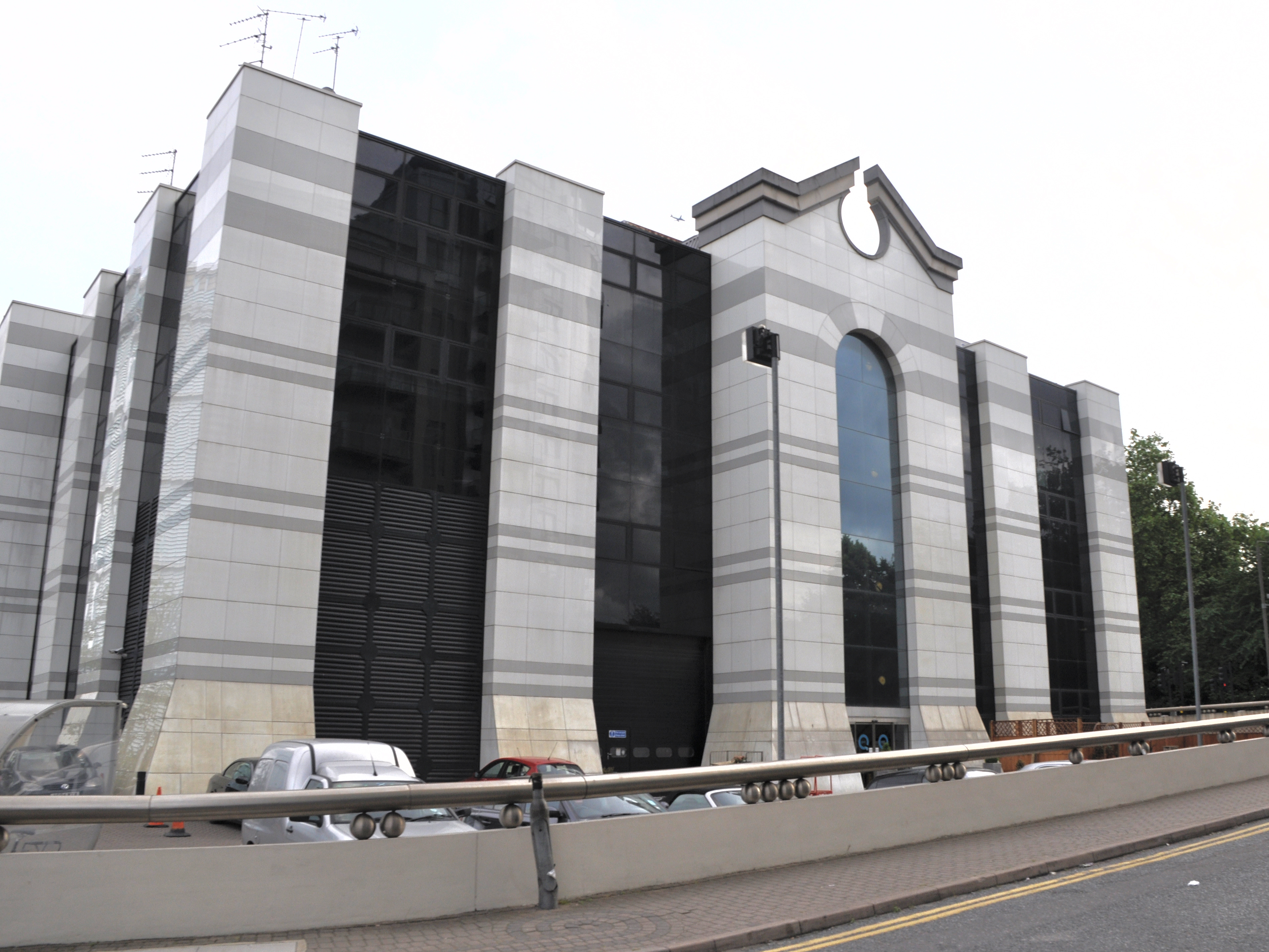

General information
- Status: Demolished
- Architectural style: Postmodernist
- Location: England
- Coordinates: 51.4801°N 0.1485°W
- Construction started: 1987-88
- Completed: 1989
- Demolished: March 2014
- Owner: Now owned by Berkeley Homes (West London)

Design and construction
- Architect: Ian Pollard

Marco Polo House (originally stylised as "Marcopolo") was a large marble-effect, glass-clad office building and TV studio at 346 Queenstown Road, facing Battersea Park in the London Borough of Wandsworth. It was built in 1987–1988 and completed in 1989 by Peter Argyrou Associates, to a design by postmodernist architect and developer Ian Pollard through his property development company, Flaxyard, and initially housed the headquarters of British Satellite Broadcasting. The building was demolished in 2014.

== Design ==
In the early 1990s, the building was described as "a high-tech glass cathedral", "palatial" and "architecturally magnificent" by the press, while traditionalists mocked its playfulness and postmodern opulence. After Postmodernism fell out of fashion, the building, like many of the style, began to divide opinion and be mocked by some critics.

The grey and white theme was echoed in silver birch trees which were planted in the forecourt of the Chelsea Bridge Business Centre/Observer offices side (the shorter side of the building). The two blocks were linked by a large, central glass atrium which featured iconic designer lifts and sanitation services.

The building is sometimes described as "marble clad", but the white-and-grey cladding is Neoparium, a luxury Japanese crystallised glass-ceramic material. Pollard favoured Neoparium over marble due to its hard-wearing qualities in extreme weather conditions. When Pollard discovered the material, it was added late in the project at great expense, but as the building was marketed as a luxury, high-specification development, this was justified. The dark tinted glass panels were customised Pilkington glass.

It was originally home to the British Satellite Broadcasting (BSB) television company and is believed to have taken its name from its first owner's Marcopolo satellites, although there is a suggestion that the name was a playful reference to the broken pediment roof outline, which Pollard supposedly said was similar to the "Mark of the Polo", referencing the sweet.

It is believed by many architecture critics that if the building had been allowed to stand for much longer, it would have been eligible for (and possibly have been granted) listed building status, which would have limited redevelopment options for developers capitalising on the Battersea Power Station and Nine Elms area regeneration in the late 2010s.

== Use ==
Although typically referred to as 'Marco Polo House' or 'The QVC Building', Marcopolo was technically only one half of the building (the three-storey, taller side which was previously used as a television company offices and studio). The other half of the adjoined structure was called originally to be called 'Chelsea Bridge Business Centre' and was initially let to The Observer for its offices, although the Marcopolo name stuck.

The building cost £26 million to construct in 1987 and was completed in 1989, at which time it was pre-let to BSB (who moved in during August 1989, fitted it out and officially launched in 1990) and The Observer. BSB promoted their move to the building in summer 1990 by sending customised Polo mints called 'Marcopolo – A Hole New Building' with their contact details on the wrapper instead of change-of-address cards to their PR contacts. The mints are on display at the National Media Museum.

The Thomas Chippendale-style broken pediment had also featured on Philip Johnson's postmodern 550 Madison Avenue in New York. The Observer newspaper was based in the building until it was acquired by The Guardian and it moved to its offices in Farringdon Road. When BSB merged with Sky to form BSkyB the new company kept the lease, and in October 1993, the building became home to shopping channel QVC's studios and offices.

The smaller half of the building was also used as the offices for another ill-fated broadcaster, ONdigital, the UK's first digital terrestrial television broadcaster, from 1998. The company was re-launched in 2001 as ITV Digital who continued to use the ONdigital offices in the building until their demise in 2002.

== Demolition ==
The building was bought by Marcus Cooper Group for around £63m in 2006. QVC decided not to renew its lease when it expired in 2012, citing expansion as the need to move. The channel looked for an alternative location – including in several cities in the North of England – for its 500 head office staff and studio centre. Broadcasting from the studios ended on 7 June 2012 and QVC moved to a new 126,000 sq ft (11,706 m^{2}) studio complex at Chiswick Business Park, West London.

Press reports in 2010 suggested that the architecturally and structurally sound Marco Polo House would be demolished, and replaced with a 12-storey luxury residential development, which was later revealed to be called Vista, designed by Scott Brownrigg. Marco Polo House's architect Pollard told the Architects' Journal the plan was a move towards a "lower grade of architecture", adding: "Marco was a fun building. It was quite iconic at the time and some people still say it is." Other critics said it was "Postmodern nonsense". The Architects' Journal's Merlin Fulcher told London's Evening Standard: "The new scheme looks decent, but it's always a shame to see an iconic structure knocked down, especially one that symbolises Eighties post-modernism so well."

In August 2013, with planning approval granted for the building's demolition, it was bought for just over £100m by Berkeley Group (who had earlier built the Chelsea Bridge Wharf scheme to its west).

The building was in a serviceable state and had not reached the end of its life. It was used by Crisis At Christmas (as The Gate) to house homeless people over the Christmas 2013 period. Although the property was still available to let in December 2013 and described as "modern TV studios/offices" by estate agent The Lorenz Consultancy, hoardings advertising Berkeley's replacement 'Vista' development were in place in January 2014.

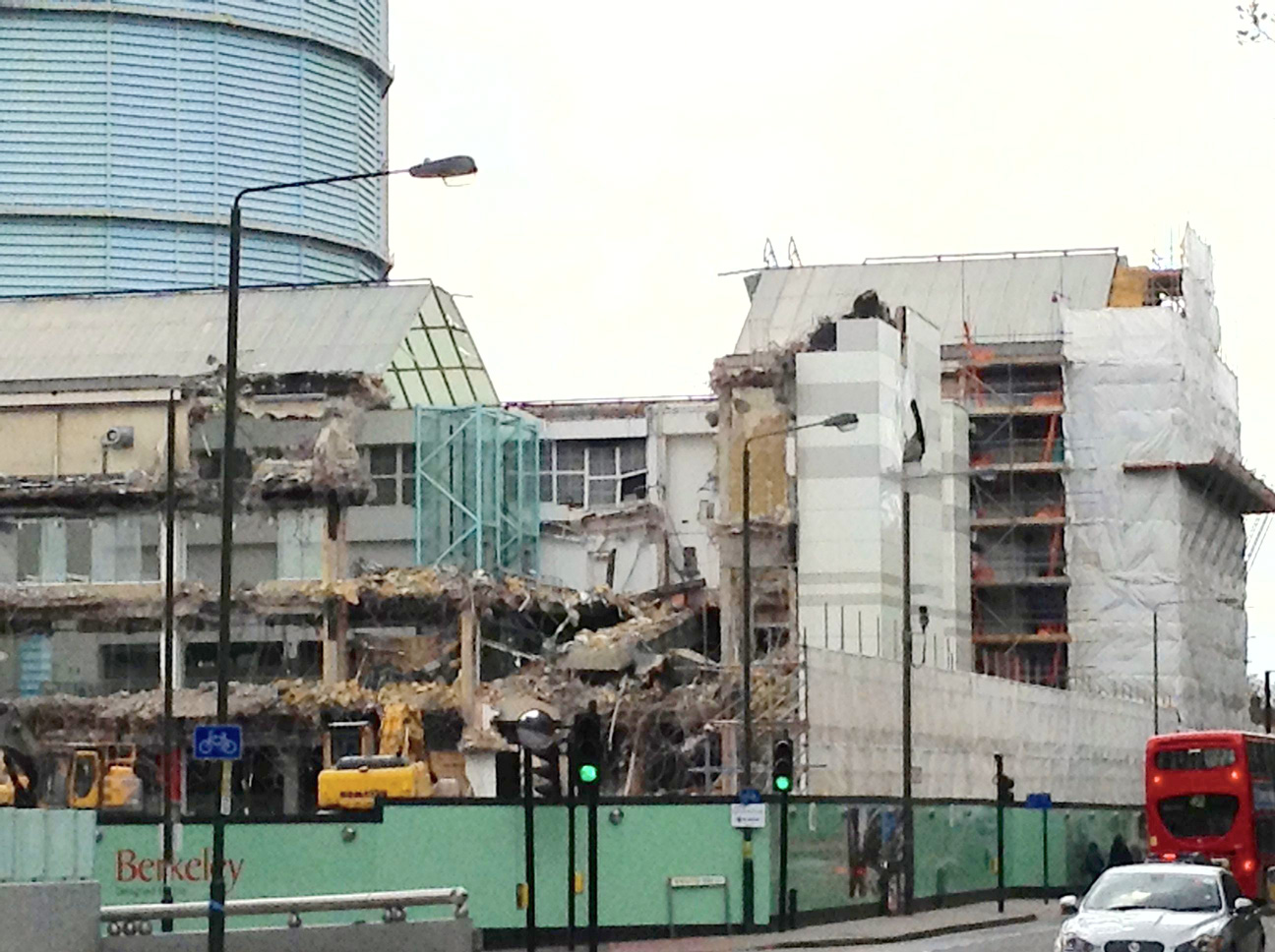
Marco Polo House demolition underway

By 8 March 2014, exterior demolition had begun. As of the end of April 2014, the entire 'Marcopolo' side had been demolished, with the central glass atrium being eroded from the central lift areas outward; demolition of the 'Chelsea Bridge' side then proceeded from the inside, leaving the exterior walls and an empty shell until last. Due to the low-rise nature of the building, the demolition was carried out using several Komatsu, Volvo and Hitachi high-reach excavators and breakers, meaning that the dismantling of the building was visible to the public and passengers on train services to and from London Victoria passing the site. The demolition contractor was Laing O'Rourke. Its demolition left Homebase Kensington as the last iconic Ian Pollard postmodern structure in London which, as of 2019, has also been demolished.

Several former workers for the various companies which had resided at the building in its heyday, including journalist Jeremy Vine, expressed their sadness at the loss of the structure, with Vine calling it "symbolic" and stating that he was "amazed" that demolition had happened.

== In media ==
The building was featured in the 2002 BBC Four documentary The Curse of Marco Polo House, Dreamspaces (episode: "80s Architecture with Justine Frischmann") from BBC Three as well as the feature films Leon The Pig Farmer, The Business and B. Monkey.

The distinctive teal glass lifts from the central adjoining atrium, which had been installed from Marcopolo's inception, were featured in some scenes of the 1993 Red Dwarf episode "Legion".

A video showing the interior during BSB days was included in the IBA's Engineering Announcements – "Tuesday April 26, 1990" ITV broadcast, which is (as of 2026) available to view on YouTube.
