= Orbital Test Satellite =

OTS 2
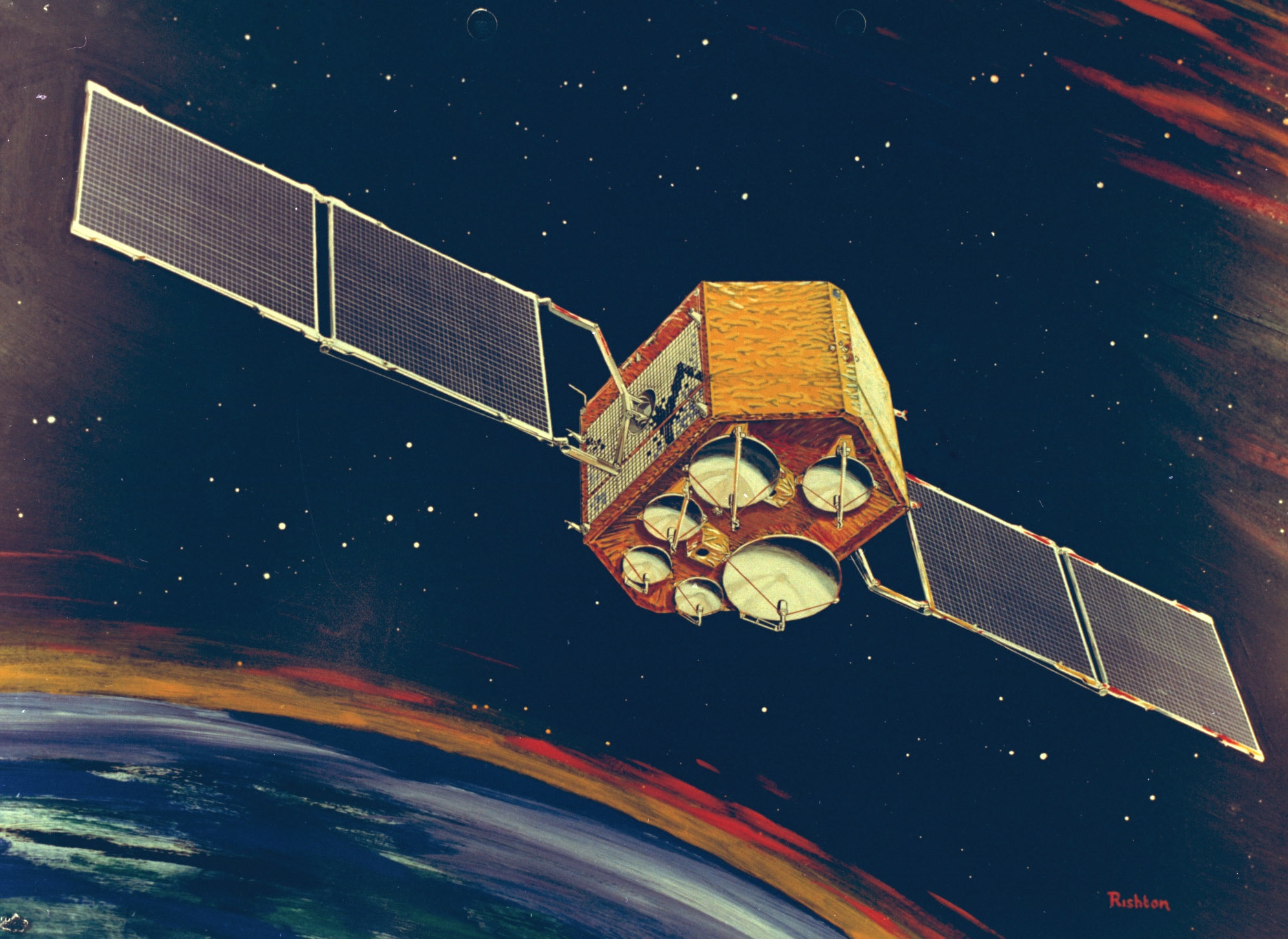
- Artist's impression of the Orbital Test Satellite
- Names: Orbital Test Satellite; OTS
- Mission type: Technology demonstration, Communications satellite
- Operator: European Space Agency (ESA)
- COSPAR ID: 1978-044A
- SATCAT no.: 10855
- Website: http://www.esa.int/
- Mission duration: 3 years (planned); 12 years, 7 months, 22 days (achieved)

Spacecraft properties
- Spacecraft: OTS 2
- Spacecraft type: OTS
- Bus: OTS Bus
- Manufacturer: British Aerospace (BAe) / Matra Marconi Space (MMS)
- Launch mass: 865 kg (1,907 lb)
- Dry mass: 390 kg (860 lb)
- Dimensions: 2.4 × 2.1 × 1.7 m (7 ft 10 in × 6 ft 11 in × 5 ft 7 in); Span: 9.3 m on orbit
- Power: 600 watts

Start of mission
- Launch date: 11 May 1978, 22:59:00 UTC
- Rocket: Delta 3914 (s/n D141)
- Launch site: Cape Canaveral, LC-17A
- Contractor: McDonnell Douglas
- Entered service: July 1978

End of mission
- Disposal: Graveyard orbit
- Deactivated: 2 January 1991

Orbital parameters
- Reference system: Geocentric orbit
- Regime: Geostationary orbit
- Longitude: 10° East

Transponders
- Band: 6 Ku-band
- Coverage area: Europe

The Orbital Test Satellite (OTS) programme was an experimental satellite system inherited by the European Space Agency (ESA) in 1975 from its predecessor, the European Space Research Organisation (ESRO). OTS was the first three-axis-stabilised Ku-band satellite, and its design has inspired the conception of almost 30 other satellites in Europe. Its successors, the Maritime European Communications Satellite (MARECS) and European Communications Satellite (ECS) series of satellites, consolidated Europe's position in communications satellite technology and manufacturing.

== OTS 1 ==
The first of the pair of OTS satellites, OTS 1, was launched on 13 September 1977 at 11:31 pm UTC at the Cape Canaveral Space Launch Complex 17. However, it was destroyed 54 seconds later due to its United States Delta launcher exploding. The failure was caused by a horizontal crack in the solid propellant core of one of the strap-on boosters, which caused the core gases to burn through the casing and ignite the fuel in the main tank of the launcher. The debris of the satellite landed in the Atlantic Ocean.

== OTS 2 ==
OTS 2 was successfully launched on 11 May 1978 at 10:59 pm UTC at the same launch complex as OTS 1, using the same Delta launch vehicle. It became one of the first geostationary communications satellites to carry six Ku-band transponders and was capable of handling 7,200 telephone circuits. With a mass of approximately 865 kg (1,907 lb), the OTS satellite bus was hexagonal with overall dimensions of 2.4 by 2.1 x 1.7 m. Two solar panels with a span of 9.3 m provided 600 watts of electrical power.

British Aerospace was the prime contractor from the European MESH consortium which developed the satellite. It completed its primary mission in 1984 after which the spacecraft was involved in a 6-year program of experiments, including the testing of a new attitude control technique taking advantage of solar radiation pressure forces. In January 1991, OTS 2 was moved out of the geostationary ring and into a graveyard orbit.
