= The Movie Channel (UK) =

Former British subscription film service operated by BSB/BSkyB (1990–1997)

- ident during BSB era

Ownership
- Owner: British Satellite Broadcasting (March until December 1990); British Sky Broadcasting (1990–1997)
- Sister channels: Galaxy; Now

History
- Launched: 25 March 1990
- Closed: 31 October 1997
- Replaced by: Sky Movies Screen 2, now part of Sky Cinema

The Movie Channel was a British television service which only aired movies. Launched on British Satellite Broadcasting, The Movie Channel was a predecessor of some of the Sky Movies channels, having survived the 1990 merger with Sky Television, another satellite service launched by Rupert Murdoch's News International.

== History ==
The Movie Channel was one of the five services of British Satellite Broadcasting, a consortium consisting of Granada Television, Pearson, Virgin, Anglia Television and Amstrad.

Known as Screen during the bidding process, the channel launched as The Movie Channel on 25 March 1990. Prior to its launch, BSB signed an exclusive first-run deal with United International Pictures (which distributed Paramount, Universal and MGM/UA releases). One of its first premieres was the 1987 James Bond film, The Living Daylights. It operated as BSB's only subscription service. Both BSB and Sky Television suffered heavy losses and within a year of launching, BSB and Sky merged, and began operating as British Sky Broadcasting. The Movie Channel, along with The Sports Channel remained on air, and it launched on the Astra 1B satellite on 15 April 1991, launching a 24-hour service the following month.

The Movie Channel continued to broadcast until 31 October 1997, when it closed by playing the ident, fading to a black screen, and after a while, cutting to the test card. The Sky Movies channels were then rebranded, and the channel was relaunched as Sky Movies Screen 2.

== See also ==
- Sky Cinema
