= Thor (satellite) =

Family of satellites

Thor (previously known as Marcopolo) is a family of satellites designed, launched and tested by Hughes Space and Communications (now part of Boeing Satellite Systems) for British Satellite Broadcasting (BSB), and were used for Britain's Direct Broadcast Service. Thor was owned by Telenor, but the division was sold to Space Norway in 2023.

Marcopolo 1 launched on 27 August 1989 on the 187th launch of a Delta rocket, and Marcopolo 2 launched on 17 August 1990, on a Delta II rocket. Both satellites were based on the HS-376 satellite bus.

Although the satellites performed as designed, BSB merged with Sky Television to form British Sky Broadcasting and the BSB satellites were sold off and renamed. This also resulted in the obsoletion of the Squarial satellite-reception antenna, which was designed to operate with Thor 1 only.

== Marcopolo 1 (Sirius 1/Sirius W) ==
Sirius W, previously known as Sirius 1, was launched on 27 August 1989. It was Hughes Space and Communications's first satellite. Marcopolo 1 was sold in December 1993 to Nordic Satellite AB of Sweden and operated until 2000 as Sirius 1 at 5°E. It was then moved to 13°W, and renamed Sirius W. It had five K_{u} band transponders.

== Marcopolo 2 (Thor 1) ==
Marcopolo 2 was launched on 18 August 1990. It had five K_{u} band transponders. It was sold in July 1992 to Telenor of Norway and renamed Thor 1. It was located at 0.8°W. It was switched off in January 2002, and in November of that year it was moved to 7.4°W and reactivated with digital test signals broadcasting toward Scandinavia. Marcopolo 2 was sent up to the junk orbit in early January 2003.

== Thor 2 ==
Thor 2 was launched on 21 May 1997, and retired in 2008 although it remained in an inclined geostationary orbit until January 2013 when it de-orbited to the graveyard orbit. It weighs 1467 kg, and has 15 K_{u} band transponders, with three spares, powered by 40-watt traveling-wave tube amplifiers (TWTAs).

== Thor 3 ==
Thor 3 (the "3" is officially "III") was a satellite used by Canal Digital in the Nordic areas for DTH services. It launched on 9 June 1998 with an expected lifetime at 12 years, and was located at 0.8°W. It had 14 active K_{u} band transponders powered by 47-watt traveling-wave tube amplifiers (TWTAs). The satellite was targeted on Scandinavia, Eastern Europe, and parts of Central Europe. Thor 3 is no longer in operation and was moved to its graveyard orbit in 2019. Thor 3 was replaced by Thor 6 in June 2010.

== Intelsat 10-02 (Thor 10-02) ==
Intelsat 10-02 was launched on 16 June 2004, located at 1°W, and was beamed toward Central Europe and the Middle East.

== Thor 5 ==
Thor 5 was launched on 11 February 2008. It was first planned that the satellite would be called Thor 2R, but Telenor named it Thor 5. It has 24 active K_{u} band transponders.

== Thor 6 ==
Thor 6 built by Thales Alenia Space was launched from the Guiana Spaceport on 29 October 2009. Telenor Satellite Broadcasting announced on 15 December that Thor 6 had completed all necessary in-orbit and ground-related testing and would commence commercial service in late December.

Thor 6 has 36 K_{u} band transponders. It provides direct-to-home television broadcasting services from the orbital location 0.8°W. It replaced Thor 3.

== Thor 7 ==
Thor 7 was built by SSL. It was successfully launched by Arianespace from Kourou spaceport on 26 April 2015. It will mainly serve maritime customers and have a total capacity of 9 Gbit/s. It was launched in tandem with the Italian/French Sicral 2 defense satellite.
