= British Satellite Broadcasting =

Former British satellite television company (1986–1990)

British Satellite Broadcasting plc
- Industry: Media
- Founded: 11 December 1986
- Defunct: 2 November 1990
- Fate: Merged with Sky Television to form BSkyB
- Successor: British Sky Broadcasting
- Headquarters: Marco Polo House, London, England
- Products: Pay TV services and programming

British Satellite Broadcasting plc (BSB) was a short-lived television company, based in London, that provided direct broadcast satellite television services to the United Kingdom. It started broadcasting on 25 March 1990. The company was merged with competing company Sky Television plc on 2 November 1990 to form British Sky Broadcasting.

== Development ==
In January 1977, the World Administrative Radio Conference assigned each country five high-powered direct broadcast by satellite channels for domestic use. In 1982, after being awarded two of the channels, the BBC proposed its own satellite service, but the government imposed two conditions on it:

- Use of a satellite built by United Satellite, a consortium of British Aerospace and Matra Marconi Space (now Airbus Defense and Space), with costs estimated at £24 million per year.
- A supplementary charter was agreed in May 1983 which allowed the BBC to borrow up to £225 million to cover the cost of the project, as it was not allowed to call on public funds, nor use existing sources of revenue to fund the project.

During Autumn 1983, the cost of Unisat was found to be greatly underestimated and the new Home Secretary announced the three remaining channels would be given to the Independent Broadcasting Authority (IBA) to allow the private sector to compete against the BBC in satellite broadcasting. Within a few months, the BBC started talking with the IBA about a joint project to help cover the cost. Subsequently, the government allowed the IBA to bring in private companies to help cover the costs (dubbed as the "Club of 21"):

- BBC – 50%
- ITV franchises – 30%
- Virgin/Thorn EMI/Granada TV Rental/Pearson Longman and Consolidated Satellite Broadcasting – 20%

Within a year, the consortium made it clear that the original launch date of 1986 would be delayed to 1989, while also asking the government to allow it to tender out the building of the new satellite system to help reduce cost. On 15 June 1985, the project failed when consortium concluded that the cost of set-up was not justifiable. The BBC stated the costs were prohibitive because the government insisted that the "Club of 21" should pay for the costs of constructing and launching a dedicated satellite.

=== IBA satellite franchise ===
On 2 April 1986, the IBA convinced the Home Secretary to revive the DBS project but under different conditions, broadly based on a report drawn up by John Jackson, by inviting the private-sector companies to apply for a new television franchise via satellite to provide a commercial service on the IBA's three DBS channels (of the five in total allocated to the United Kingdom). One of the conditions imposed on applicants by the IBA was that they use a new untried transmission standard, D-MAC. This was part of the European Communities' support for the HD-MAC high-definition television standard which was being developed by Philips and other European companies. The technology was still at the laboratory stage and was incompatible with previous standards: HD-MAC transmissions could not be received by existing television sets which used PAL or SECAM standards. The condition to use a high-power (230 watt) satellite was dropped, and no winner was precluded from buying a foreign satellite system.

The IBA received five major contenders with serious bids for the direct broadcast satellite franchises. It also received submissions from The Children's Channel and ITN to make sure their programmes were used on any successful bid:

Franchise name	Consortium led by	Proposed channels
British Satellite Broadcasting	Granada Television; Pearson; Virgin Group; Anglia Television; Amstrad; Independent Television News	Screen (£2.50 per week); ZigZag; Galaxy; Now
DBS UK Limited	Carlton Communications; London Weekend Television; Saatchi & Saatchi; Dixons Retail; Robert Fleming Merchant Bank	News, sport and business channel; Entertainment channel; Super Channel
Direct Broadcasting Limited	British and Commonwealth Shipping; Cambridge Electronic Industries; Electronics Rental Group; News International (backed by Rupert Murdoch); Sears plc	Children and families; Films; Sky Channel
National Broadcasting Service	James Lee (former head of Goldcrest Films); Robert Holmes à Court's Bell Group	Children and sports fans; 24-hour news channel
SatUK Broadcasting	Muir Sutherland; Jimmy Hartley; Alan Bond; Celtic Films	Entertainment channel (free-to-air); Movie channel (£5 per month); Family channel (£2 per month)

==== Winning bid ====
British Satellite Broadcasting won the 15-year franchise on 11 December 1986 to operate the DBS system, with a licence to operate three channels. BSB forecast 400,000 homes would be equipped during its first year, but some doubts were cast as to whether this was possible. The Cable Authority welcomed the service, believing it would encourage more users, especially with its dedicated movie network. The original four satellite channels were:

Channel name	Description
Screen (Note: Became The Movie Channel (British TV channel) when launched on 25 March 1990.)	Subscription-based movie channel with a price of £2.50 per week, which include recent cinema releases and BSB's encouragement at least 12 new productions every year.
ZigZag	Family daytime service (shared with Screen) devoted to feature Disney classics, animated cartoons, nature documentaries and other content were suitable for young children.
Galaxy	General entertainment channel with programmes such as dramas, serials, plays, soap operas and quiz shows from 6.00pm.
Now	Live 24-hour news, sport and current affairs service operated by ITN, providing extensive coverage of world events expected to contribute a substantial amount of programming.

== Preparations for launch ==
Around the time of the licence award, Amstrad withdrew its backing, as they believed it was not possible to sell a satellite dish and D-MAC standard receiver for £250. Australian businessman Alan Bond joined the consortium along with Reed Elsevier, Chargeurs, Next and London Merchant Securities, amongst others. BSB earmarked the bulk of the first round of financing for buying and launching two satellites (for redundancy and provision of further channels later) and planned a second round close to the commencement of broadcasting operations. It commissioned the Hughes Aircraft Company to provide two high-powered satellites using launch vehicles from McDonnell Douglas (later United Launch Alliance). Both companies were American and had established reputations for reliability. Hughes was the main contractor and offered a commercial space industry first, "in-orbit delivery", in a contract signed on 6 August 1987. BSB's risk was reduced because payments became due only after the satellites were launched and operational.

On 8 June 1988, rival tycoon Rupert Murdoch – having failed to gain regulatory approval for his satellite service to become part of the BSB consortium – announced that his pan-European television station Sky Channel, would be relaunched as a four-channel, United Kingdom-based service called Sky Television, using the Astra system and broadcast in PAL with analogue sound. BSB had been aware of the impending launch of Astra when it submitted its proposal to the IBA in 1986 but had discounted it, partly on advice from the IBA that it would not have been possible for Sky to securely scramble an analogue PAL signal and a prediction that satisfactory reception from a medium-powered satellite such as Astra would not be possible with a dish of under 1.2 metres, which would require individual planning permission for each customer. Lazard Brothers, the Pearson subsidiary responsible for BSB's first fundraising memorandum, reportedly regarded Astra as technology-led rather than programming-led and, therefore, an unlikely threat.

The stage was set for a dramatic confrontation: BSB, expecting to be the United Kingdom's only satellite service, was faced with an aggressive drive by Murdoch's Sky to be the first service to launch. As Britain's official satellite television provider, BSB had high hopes as the company planned to provide a mixture of highbrow programming and popular entertainment, from arts and opera to blockbuster movies and music videos. The service would also be technically superior, broadcasting in the D-MAC (Multiplexed Analogue Components type D) system dictated by the European Union regulations with potentially superior picture sharpness, digital stereo sound, and the potential to show widescreen programming; rather than the existing PAL system. BSB claimed that Sky's PAL pictures would be too degraded by satellite transmission, and that in any case, BSB would broadcast superior programming. SES (later operators of the O3b data satellites and others with names including AMC, Ciel, NSS, QuetzSat, YahSat and SES, and formerly at that time, the Astra TV satellite operator), had no regulatory permission to broadcast, had plans (initially) for only one satellite with no backup, and the European satellite launch vehicle Ariane suffered repeated failures. However, SES used the resulting delay time to re-engineer the satellite to reduce the dish size needed, which would otherwise have been larger than 60 cm (24").

To distance itself from Sky and its dish antennas, BSB announced a new type of flat-plate satellite antenna called a "squarial" (i.e., "square aerial"). The illustrative model shown to the press was a dummy and BSB commissioned a working version under 45 cm (18") wide. A conventional dish of the same diameter was also available. The company had serious technical problems with the development of ITT's D-MAC silicon chips needed for its MAC receivers. BSB was still hoping to launch in September 1989 but eventually had to admit that the launch would be delayed. By 22 July 1988 in a bid to gain more viewers, BSB and the BBC prepared a bid for a four-year deal for the rights to broadcast top league football, outbidding ITV's £44 million offer. BSB had also committed about £400 million to tie up the film libraries of Paramount, Universal, Columbia and MGM/United Artists, with total up-front payments of about £85 million.

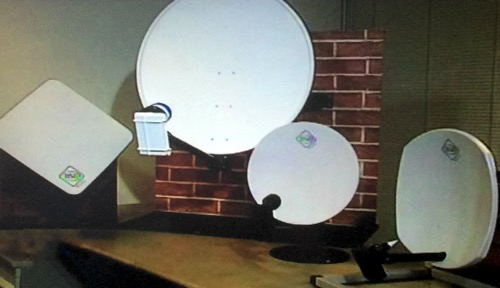
A photo of all three BSB dishes available, the squarial, a Sky dish for comparison, the round BSB dish, and the square BSB dish.

On 1 February 1989, BSB's costs had started to climb, reaching £354 million, while chief executive Anthony Simonds-Gooding denied that BSB had gone over budget and would require more than the planned £625 million it required to operate up to 1993. Virgin pulled out of the BSB consortium in December 1988, ostensibly because it was going private again and had become increasingly concerned about BSB's mounting costs. The film-rights battle proved to be the final straw for Virgin since it would necessitate a "supplementary first round" of financing of £131 million in January earlier that year in addition to the initial £222.5 million. After unsuccessfully offering its stake in BSB to the remaining founders, Virgin sold it to the Bond Corporation, already BSB's largest shareholder for a nominal profit.

Despite the delayed launch, BSB continued to invest heavily in marketing in 1989 to minimize the effects of Sky's timing advantage. BSB also received a needed boost in June 1989 when it won the franchises for the two remaining British high-powered DBS channels, beating six other bidders when the BBC dropped all plans for use of its allocated channels. BSB revised its line-up to include separate channels for films, sports, pop music, general entertainment and current affairs. Unfortunately, this increased the size of the dishes which the public had to purchase from 25 to 35–40 centimetres; subsidies from BSB helped maintain retail prices at £250.

== Launch of five-channel service ==
There were five satellite channels for the general public with a sixth part-time service on subscription for business users, as BSB Datavision was a subsidiary of the company which offered encrypted television sets and data reception through domestic receivers. BSB's channel line-up launched over five consecutive days in one at a time was:

Channel name	Launch date	Description
The Movie Channel	25 March 1990	Dedicated movie channel, airing recently made films to subscribers for £10 a month.
Galaxy	26 March 1990	Entertainment channel, airing general entertainment such as comedy and drama, as well as children's programmes.
The Sports Channel	27 March 1990	Sports channel, known for its international, Scottish and Italian football, golf, boxing, and tennis coverage. Timeshared with The Computer Channel.
Now	28 March 1990	Lifestyle channel, airing lifestyle and current affairs on weekdays, and arts programmes at the weekend.
The Power Station	29 March 1990	Music channel, airing programmes aimed towards the teenage market, as well as live concerts.
The Computer Channel	28 June 1990 (Closed: 29 November 1990)	Technology channel, airing IT programmes, as well as training programmes for the computer industry. Timeshared with The Sports Channel.

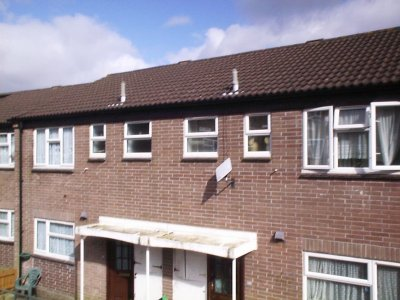
A squarial installed on a house wall

BSB launched its service on cable 25 March 1990 and on satellite at the end of April, with the slogan It's Smart to be Square. The launch, six months late, came 13 months after Sky's launch. BSB was due to start broadcasting in September 1989 but was delayed by problems with the supply of receiving equipment and because BSB wanted to avoid Sky's experience of launching when most shops had no equipment to sell.

BSB claimed to have around 750,000 subscriptions while Sky had extended its reach into more than 1.5 million homes. It was believed both companies could break even if subscriptions reached three million households, with most analysts expecting this to be reached in 1992.

== Competition and merger ==
Sky's head start over BSB proved that the PAL system would give adequate picture quality, and that many viewers would be happy to watch Sky's more populist output as opposed to waiting for the promised quality programming pledged by BSB. Sky had launched its multichannel service from studios at an industrial estate in Isleworth, with a 10-year lease on SES transponders for an estimated £50 million without backup. BSB on the other hand, would operate from more expensive headquarters at Marco Polo House in Battersea, with construction and launch of its own satellites costing an estimated £200 million as the second of which was a backup.

When BSB finally went on air in March 1990 (13 months after Sky), the company's technical problems were resolved and its programming was critically acclaimed. However, its D-MAC receivers were more expensive than Sky's PAL equivalents and incompatible with them. Many potential customers compared the competition between the rival satellite companies to the format war between VHS and Betamax recorders, and chose to wait and see which company would win outright in order to avoid buying potentially obsolete equipment. Both BSB and Sky had begun to struggle with the burden of huge losses, rapidly increasing debts and ongoing startup costs. On 2 November 1990, a 50:50 merger was announced to form a single company called British Sky Broadcasting (marketed as "Sky").

Following the merger, BSkyB moved quickly to rationalise the combined channels it now owned:

Channel name	Description
Galaxy	The entertainment channel was closed with its transponder handed over to Sky One on 2 December 1990.
Now	The factual, lifestyle and arts channel was closed with its transponder handed over to Sky News on 1 December 1990, although as some arts programming was still to be shown, a short term opt-out service called Sky Arts was launched for broadcast on the Marcopolo transponder at weekends.
The Power Station	Music channel remained on air until 8 April 1991, and it was replaced on its Marcopolo transponder by Sky Movies.
The Sports Channel	Initially retained its name but was rebranded to Sky Sports on 20 April 1991.
The Movie Channel	Remained on air with its Marcopolo transponder shortly before the launch of the Astra 1B system on 15 April 1991.

== Outcomes ==
BSB's shareholders and Murdoch's News International made huge profits on their investments, the 50:50 merged venture having an effective quasi-monopoly on British satellite pay-television. From a United Kingdom perspective, British Satellite Broadcasting's existence prevented 100% of these profits being made by News International, reducing Murdoch's ability to influence government policy. At one stage of the saga, News International was facing dismemberment at the hands of its bankers.

Following the takeover of Sky by Comcast in October 2018, Murdoch's operations were no longer involved in British television but retained newspaper assets through News Corp.

The Marcopolo satellites were eventually withdrawn and later sold (Marcopolo 1 on 21 December 1993 to NSAB of Sweden and Marcopolo 2 on 1 July 1992 to Telenor of Norway). NSAB operated Marcopolo 1 (as Sirius 1) until sending it to a safe disposal orbit in 2003 as it reached the end of its operational life when fuel ran out. Marcopolo 2 was operated (as Thor 1) until January 2002 and then disposed of.

== Regulatory context ==
A new television transmission system, Multiplexed Analogue Components, was originally developed for high-definition television but European manufacturers developed patented variants and successfully lobbied regulators such that it was adopted by the Commission of the European Communities as the standard for all direct broadcast satellites. This had the effect that the low-cost non-European manufacturers would not only have to pay royalties to the manufacturers, but would also not have direct access to the technology, and hence would always be behind with new developments.

In the United Kingdom, the Independent Broadcasting Authority developed a variant, D-MAC, which had marginal audio channel improvements, and insisted on its use by the satellite service to be licensed by itself. In the rest of Europe, satellite television manufacturers standardised on another variant, D2-MAC, which used less bandwidth and was compatible with the extensive existing European cable systems. With the launch of BSB, the IBA became a member of the secret "MAC Club" of European organisations which owned patents on MAC variants and had a royalty-sharing agreement for all television and set-top boxes sold.

The IBA was not directed to be an "economic regulator", so the free market in lower power satellite bandwidth satellites (such as SES Astra) leveraged the benefits of the existing lower cost PAL transmissions with pre-existing set-top box technology. The IBA was rendered helpless and Murdoch voluntarily agreed to adhere to those Broadcasting Standards Commission rules relating to non-economic matters, such as the technology used. Ironically the past-deadline encryption system in the D-MAC silicon chip technology was one primary reason for BSB having to merge with Sky, and hence the Far Eastern television manufacturers had largely unfettered access to the market when MAC was wound down in favour of PAL.

After the merger, BSB D-MAC receivers were sold off cheaply and some enthusiasts modified them to allow reception of D2-MAC services available on other satellites. BSB receivers, Ferguson in particular, could be modified by replacing a microprocessor. Upgrade kits from companies such as Trac Satellite allowed re-tuning whilst other kits allowed fully working menu systems and decoding of 'soft' encrypted channels, although this required the receiver to have one of the later MAC chipsets. Some kits even included smart card readers and full D2-MAC decoding capability.

== Location ==
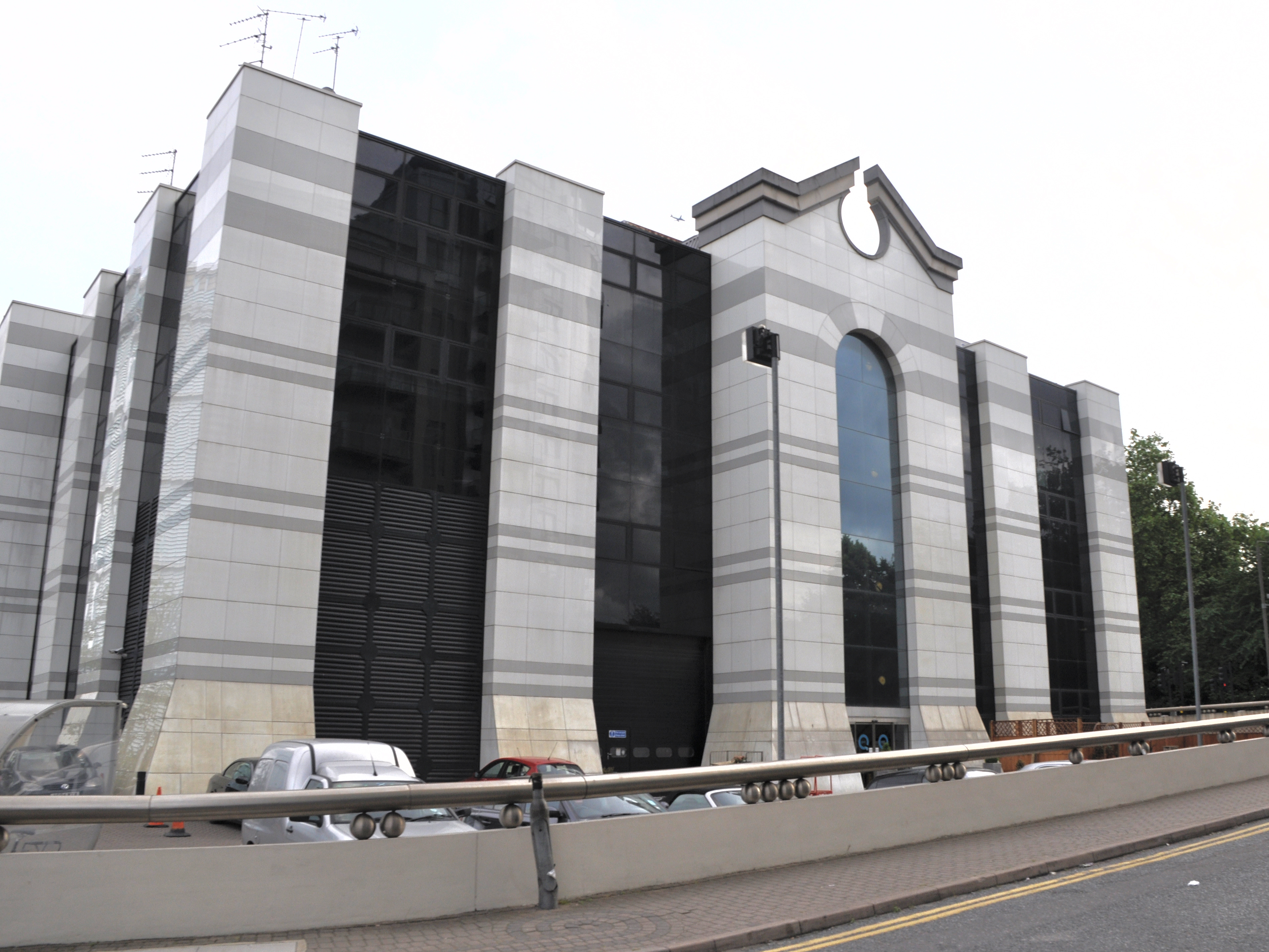
Marco Polo House was BSB's headquarters from 1989.

Marco Polo House (originally stylised as "Marcopolo") was a large marble-effect, glass-clad office building at 346 Queenstown Road, facing Battersea Park in the London Borough of Wandsworth. It was built in 1987–1988 and completed in 1989 by Peter Argyrou Associates at a cost of £26 million.

The headquarters were vacated, leading to redundancy for most BSB staff, with only a few moving to work at Sky Television's studios in Isleworth. The building was retained by the new company and from 1 October 1993 became the home of shopping channel QVC when its British version launched. Broadcasting platform ITV Digital also moved into part of the building as part of the settlement that saw Sky forced out of the original company before it went into administration on 27 March 2002.

The building was demolished in March 2014 and replaced by several blocks of luxury apartments.
