= Sky Store =

Service operated by Sky Group

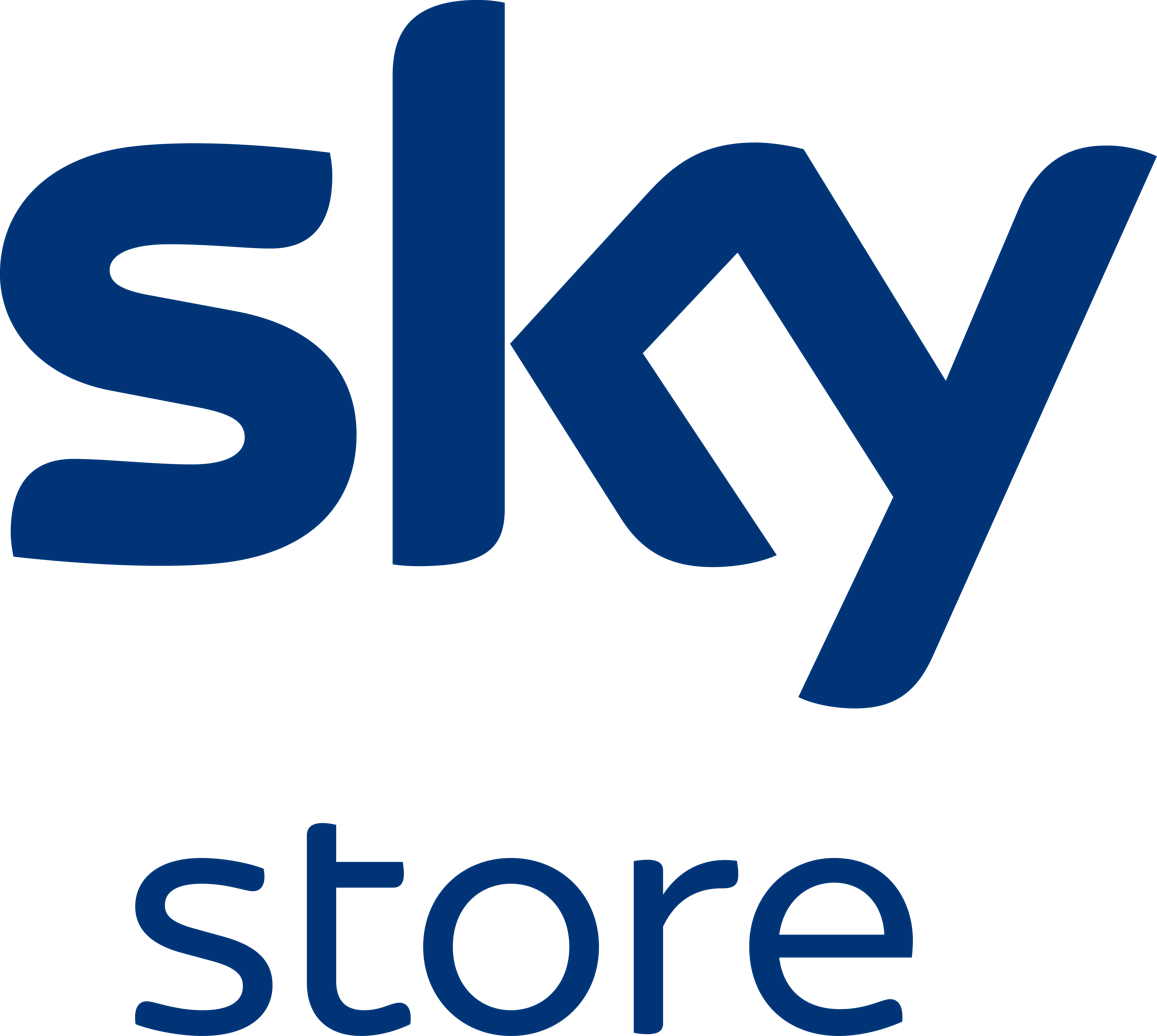
Logo Used Since 24 Feb 2026

Sky Store is a service operated by Sky Group in the United Kingdom, Ireland, Germany, Austria and Switzerland that offers movies and TV shows via video streaming, or DVD and Blu-ray by mail. It originally launched in 2012 by Sky UK offering over 1,000 movies pay-per-view to Sky Anytime+ customers, and the "Buy & Keep" model launched in 2014. Sky Store is independent from Sky's satellite TV service, meaning that a Sky TV subscription is not required.

The service offers the latest blockbuster movies, TV shows, as well as classic movies for renting (starting from 99p) or buying to keep (from £7.99), digitally in HD quality and optionally a physical version by post. The Sky Store service comes preloaded on Sky Q and Sky+HD boxes, and is also available as a downloadable app on PCs, Now TV, Roku, Android, and other devices.

Sky Store was launched in Germany and Austria in 2017, and Switzerland in 2018.
