= Digibox =

Sky UK satellite TV device

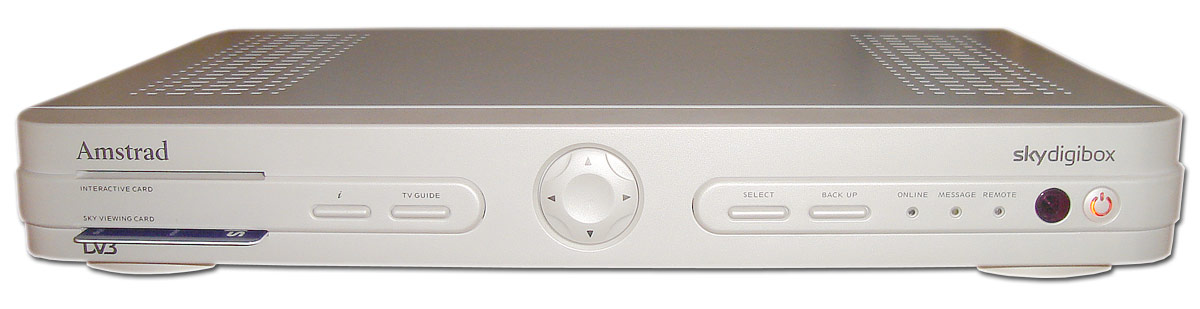
An Amstrad Digibox with a Viewing Card inserted

Sky Viewing Card

The Digibox is a device marketed by Sky UK in the UK and Ireland to enable home users to receive digital satellite television broadcasts (satellite receiver) from the Astra satellites at 28.2° east. An Internet service was also available through the device, similar in some ways to the American MSN TV, before being discontinued in 2015. The first Digiboxes shipped to consumers in October 1998 when Sky Digital was launched, and the hardware reference design has been relatively unchanged since then. Compared to other satellite receivers, they are severely restricted. As of 2020, Sky Digiboxes have become largely outmoded, superseded by Sky's latest-generation Sky Q boxes and Sky Glass televisions; The previous generation Sky+HD boxes are still in use, however.

== Base technical details ==
The Digibox's internal hardware specifications are not publicly disclosed, however some details are clearly visible on the system. All early boxes except the Pace Javelin feature dual SCART outputs, an RS-232 serial port, a dual-output RF modulator with passthrough, and RCA socketed audio outputs, as well as a 33.6 modem and an LNB cable socket. A VideoGuard card slot, as well as a second smart-card reader are fitted to the front (these are for the Sky viewing card and other interactive cards). All share an identical user interface and EPG, with the exception of Sky+ HD boxes which have used the new Sky+ HD Guide since early 2009. The DRX595 dropped the RF modulator outputs. A PC type interface was fitted internally to some early standard boxes but was never utilised by Sky. The latest HD boxes only have a single SCART socket but have a RCA/phono socket for composite video output. All Sky+ and HD boxes have an optical sound output.

The serial port outputs data used for the Sky Gnome and Sky Talker. The Sky Gamepad sends data to the box via the serial port.

Uniquely, the second RF port outputs a 9 V power signal which is used to power 'tvLINK' devices that can be attached to the RF cable next to a TV in a remote room. The tvLINK has an IR detector and sends commands from the remote control back to the Digibox on a 6 MHz carrier on the RF cable. This allows the Sky box to be viewed and controlled from another room by running a single RF cable.

All Digiboxes run on OpenTV (the latest HD boxes now use what is known internally as Project Darwin software) with Sky's EPG software and NDS VideoGuard conditional access. The Digibox receives software updates over the air, even when in standby mode should an update be available. The software features Sky-controlled channel numbering, the ability to view OpenTV or WapTV applications provided as "interactive" or "teletext" content on channels (with the full-Internet style service available at first via Open... and later Sky Active), parental controls, the ability to order PPV events and some basic control over lists of favorite channels and show reminders.

Early decoders seemingly support only 700 channels approximately in their channel listing, as Sky has announced it is halting SD channels' launch applications, with over 100 awaiting launch, over 600 existing channels, and an average closure rate of 1 per week.

== Digibox remote control ==
The Standard Sky Remote in blue

The Digibox remote control comes in four physical designs - blue with new Sky logo, blue with old Sky logo (this version was being issued from around the first year of the Sky service, although that logo fell out of use before it launched), black with new Sky logo (Sony boxes only) and silver with new Sky logo. However, all have multiple variations at present with a new version of Sky remote control being produced every year, to support the addition of new televisions to its universal remote control capabilities.

== Use outside Sky's system ==
The units are DVB-S compatible, and usually carry the DVB logo on the front. However, their use as a DVB-S receiver for anything other than Sky services is seriously limited by their reduced choice of symbol rates (22,000 and 27,500; additionally 28,250 and 29,000 on Sky+ HD), and their inability to store more than 50 (fewer still on some models) non-EPG channels without losing them. Following a software "upgrade" the Digibox will not display programmes from non 28.2 East Satellites. Additionally, once any form of parental controls are enabled, the "Other Channels" menu requires PIN entry on every use.

The box also refuses to let users view channels which are free-to-air but displaying flags claiming encryption, which locks out some channels even on the satellites Sky use themselves, such as Free to View channels and the "EPG Background Audio" channel.

== Manufacturers and non-common features ==
Digiboxes have been made by Amstrad, Sony, Thomson, Panasonic, Grundig, and most commonly, Pace. Although the reference designs were identical, a number of digibox lines have specific faults or traits, such as failing modems on Grundig units, and unstable tuners on older model Pace boxes. Some units add features not found on other models, such as S-Video sockets on some Grundig units, and TOSLINK output on Sony's.

For a long period of time in 2004 and 2005, only one Digibox was in production, the Pace DS430N, but Amstrad and Thomson have resumed production with the DRX500 and DSi4212 boxes respectively. Digiboxes for new customers are assigned randomly, and cannot be chosen, creating an after market for specific boxes due to their individual features. Sky bought out Amstrad satellite production in 2007 and now only distribute boxes which initially appeared as Amstrad models but are now badged merely as Sky.

== Standardized design ==
In late 2005, it was announced that all future Digiboxes would have a standardized cosmetic design, although retain the three current makers, and have a slightly redesigned remote control, which would be recoloured white with some blue keys.

Thomson and Amstrad began supplying these boxes in late 2005 (with the DSI4214 and DRX550, respectively), with Pace following in late 2006 (with the DS445NB). The standardized design is known as the "Flow" design.

== Other Digiboxes ==
A second generation of Digibox exists, marketed as Sky+. These PVR units have three versions: the 40 GB PVR1, the 40 GB PVR2, and the PVR3 which is fitted with a 160 GB HDD with 80GB available for user recordings, and the remaining 80 GB reserved for use by Sky Anytime. All have dual LNB inputs and an optical digital audio output, as well as all other features of the Sky box. These units are manufactured by Amstrad, Pace and Thomson only, and use a different remote control. USB ports are fitted to the PVR3. When Sky+ was launched, there was an additional £10 monthly charge to access the Sky+ functionality if two or more premium packages were not subscribed to. Sky have now removed this charge, effective 1 July 2007. Without a Sky+ Subscription, the Sky+ box reverts to the functionality of a normal Digibox, albeit without Autoview modes.

The Sky+2TB box has 2 TB to record to and is manufactured solely by Thomson. This unit is also fitted with USB ports. (this unit has been discontinued)

A third generation of Digibox also exists, with the additional ability to receive DVB-S2 HDTV signals in the MPEG-4 format. The initial sole manufacturer of these Sky+ HD boxes was Thomson, and made their debut on 22 May 2006 with the launch of HDTV channels on Sky. Although around 17,000 digiboxes were initially produced, they could not meet demand and some had to wait for longer for their SkyHD Digibox. Past manufacturers are Thomson, Pace, Amstrad and Samsung.

These boxes have all the features of a Sky+ box, as well as a HDMI output, and the early Thomson DSI8215 model has component video output. Both SATA and Ethernet ports are also supplied, currently used for the Sky Anytime+ service. As well as requiring a Sky+ subscription or any subscription, HD versions of the subscription channels require the payment of an additional £10.25 (or €15) per month, although HD channels can be viewed on free-to-air services such as BBC One HD, BBC Two HD, BBC Four HD, CBBC HD, ITV HD, ITVBe HD, Channel 4 HD, NHK World HD and with a Freesat from Sky card, Channel 5 HD.

On 16 March 2011, Sky launched the Sky HD box, primarily targeted at multiroom subscribers. and also used for Freesat from Sky installations. The Sky HD box is not a personal video recorder, meaning it has no hard disk and cannot support the Sky+ functionality. These were later replaced with Sky+HD boxes, which had both sets of functionality.

== Card pairing ==
All Sky boxes, whether Digiboxes, Sky+ or SkyHD incorporate card pairing. This involves the 'marrying' or 'pairing' of a viewing card to one particular STB, thus preventing one card (and indeed subscription) being used on multiple digiboxes. During installation the engineer will initiate a 'callback' from the STB to Sky via modem and telephone line, transmitting details of the viewing card number and the box in which it is installed. Once this step has been completed it is no longer possible to view premium channels such as Movies or Sports on any other box besides that which the card was paired with. The card can still be used to view non-premium channels such as Sky1 but will display an error message when attempting to watch a movie channel or sports channel with an unpaired box and card combination. A card can be 're-paired' in some instances such as STB replacement or multiroom relocation, however this must be initiated by Sky and cannot be completed by an end-user.

== Power consumption ==
Standard Digiboxes use almost as much power in standby as when active; the "standby" setting merely mutes the sound and cuts off the picture, but internal signal processing continues at the same rate. Sky+ boxes are believed to reduce their power consumption more significantly in standby because they can spin down hard disks. Power consumption for the standard box varies from around 10 to 18 Watts. Most Sky+HD boxes consume up to 60W when active, falling to ~30W when the disc is powered down. To some degree, this has been addressed with the latest DRX890/895 HD boxes. These have a power consumption of 45W max but now have a "deep sleep" mode consuming around 1/2 W.

== See also ==
- Digital television adapter
- Set-top box
- British Sky Broadcasting
- Sky (UK & Ireland)
- Astra 28.2°E
