= Sky Gnome =

Device for accessing radio channels and digital television

The Sky Gnome was a device from British Sky Broadcasting launched under their Sky Digital brand. It allowed users to listen to radio channels and digital television from their Sky digibox from around the house.

== History ==
The Sky Gnome was released in September 2005 and was available until mid-2007 with a retail price of £75. Although Sky no longer markets the 'Gnome', it is still possible to use existing units. Until recent times, the website was available to use, but now it shows the message: "I'm Gone", as well as the manufacturer's website (though that is covered with a simple domain holding page).

The Gnome had many advantages compared to a DAB receiver: It provided more stations than a DAB radio, and the broadcasts were almost all of higher audio quality on satellite than via DAB. It worked anywhere in the UK that has a satellite installation compared to DAB which does not have universal coverage.

A major disadvantage, however, was the device was not strictly a radio device and instead was effectively an external speaker - meaning it was not possible for one person to use the Sky TV service and another to listen to a different radio station.

== Technical information ==
The Sky Gnome used a 433 MHz digital communication link to communicate information to and from the Digibox, the wide FM modulated audio was sent on one of four channels: 863.4 MHz, 863.8 MHz, 864.2 MHz, or 864.6 MHz.

The Sky Gnome sender box connected to the main Digibox using the RS-232, audio out and RF2 connections. RS-232 is used to obtain information about the Sky box, such as current channel and time, while the RF2 connection is used for transmitting remote control inputs from the Gnome to the digibox.

The Sky Gnome was compatible with the Sky and Sky+ Digiboxes. When used in a non-Sky satellite receiver, it was possible to listen to the radio channels, it was possible to change the channels of the receiver from the Sky Gnome.
