= Squariel =

Squariel may refer to:

- Ariel Square Four motorcycle

See also:

- Squarial, a square-shaped satellite TV aerial used by BSB in the UK
