= Squarial =

Satellite dish used by British Satellite Broadcasting

The Squarial
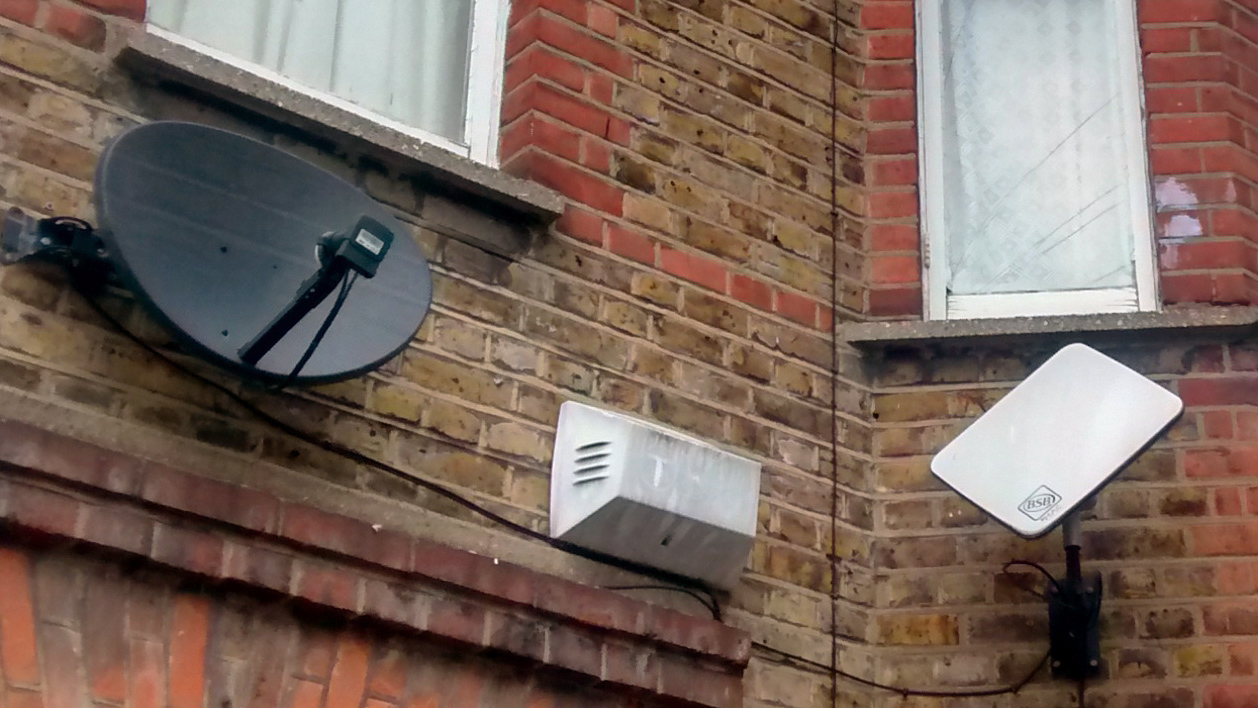
- a Squarial (right), adjacent to a Sky Minidish
- Inception: 1990
- Manufacturer: British Satellite Broadcasting
- Available: Obsolete
- Notes; The Squarial became obsolete when the Marco Polo satellites were shut down (and sold) upon BSB's merger with Sky

The Squarial (a portmanteau of the words square and aerial) was a satellite antenna used for reception of the now defunct British Satellite Broadcasting television service (BSB). The Squarial was a flat plate satellite antenna, built to be unobtrusive and unique. BSB was counting on the form factor of the antenna to clearly differentiate itself from its competitors at the time. At the time of development, satellite installations usually required a 90 cm dish in order to receive a clear signal from the transmitting satellite. The smaller antenna was BSB's unique selling point and was heavily advertised in order to attract customers to its service.

== History ==
The Squarial was launched at a high-profile event in Marco Polo House, BSB's headquarters. The media were invited to a demonstration to see how much better MAC pictures could be than PAL. But MAC took a back seat when BSB unveiled the mock up Squarial, to replace the dish aerials usually needed for satellite reception. The Squarial was a surprise to everyone, including the four companies which had signed to manufacture the receivers which would have to work with the new aerial. The Squarial deal, with British company Fortel, had been struck only hours before the London event. BSB was itself surprised at the press reaction.

The media were apparently so excited by the new antenna that they failed to ask whether there was a working prototype, and there wasn't. All that existed at this point was a wood-and-plastic dummy. Believing that someone would be able to make the Squarial work as well as a much larger dish, BSB built a whole advertising campaign on the Squarial. STC in Paignton was the first company to make a British Squarial. These were a little bigger, 38 cm across, to provide adequate reception throughout the UK, and more expensive than a dish. Due to production delays and limited availability of the STC squarial and to save face at launch, BSB sourced already available Squarials from Matsushita (now called Panasonic) in Japan which was producing them in quantity for the Japanese market. Industry rumours at the time of launch suggested that BSB was buying the squarials from Matsushita for several hundred pounds each and heavily subsidising the cost to the four manufacturers of DMAC receiver. The Matsushita squarial was of a slightly better quality construction compared to the STC design and was used by Ferguson, Philips and Tatung while ITT-Nokia supplied the STC squarial. However all offered the 30 cm traditional mini dish for a slightly lower price (several dish manufacturers were used including Lenson Heath and Channel Master).

The Squarial was withdrawn from sale in November 1990, a few days after the merger between BSB and Sky Television and it became obsolete in 1993, when the Marcopolo satellites, which the Squarial received, stopped broadcasting signals from BSkyB, which had carried the Sky channels over the D-Mac system for a period.

== Technology ==
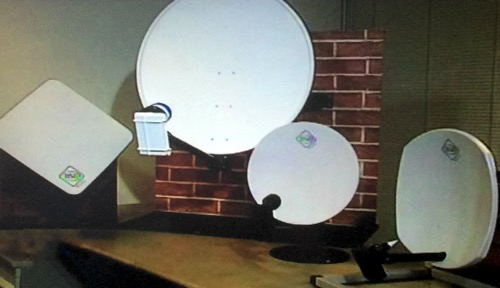
A photo of all three BSB dishes available, the squarial, a Sky dish for comparison, the round BSB dish, and the square BSB dish.

Unlike a normal satellite dish, which uses a parabolic reflector to focus the radio waves on a single feed horn antenna, the Squarial was a phased array antenna, a common design in which multiple small antennas work together to receive the waves. The Squarial consisted of a planar array of either 144 or 256 resonant cavity antennas spaced 0.9 wavelength apart, all embedded in plastic. Each antenna element was a tiny open-ended metal box in which the microwave downlink radio waves excited standing waves, with a wire probe projecting in which received the radio waves and conducted them to an integral low-noise block converter (LNB) amplifier. The feed network combined the radio currents from the separate elements with the correct phase so that radio waves from the desired direction would be in phase and add together, while radio waves from other directions would be out of phase and cancel.

Since the microwaves had to pass through the plastic surface to reach the antennas, special low-loss plastic was used. Three of these plastic sheets were stacked upon each other, padded with polystyrene layers to add rigidity to the unit. All this was engineered into a 38 cm white plastic body with the BSB logo at the bottom. The low-noise block converter mounted in the center, behind the layers, was a standard unit similar to those in other satellite dishes, which converts the frequencies from the satellite down to a lower frequency band around 800 MHz and transmits it through a coaxial cable into the building to the set-top box at the TV. It was manufactured by Matsushita and rated as a 10 GHz standard unit.

The Squarial's small size was possible thanks to the high power of the two Marcopolo DBS satellites, which simulcast the same channels on the same frequencies. The broadcast power was 59 dBW, with a 0.05 degree accuracy.

Manufacturers of the DMAC receivers used with the Squarial included, Ferguson, Phillips, Nokia and Tatung.

== Modification ==
The Squarial was a specialized antenna designed specifically for operation on the Marco Polo satellites' frequency range. The LNB could only tune a limited range of frequencies and when utilised in modern circumstances the frequency is subsequently offset by around 100 MHz.

Some owners modified the squarial to operate with the Thor satellite system (formerly BSB's own satellites, Marcopolo) after the decline of BSB. This was due in large part to the highly discounted price of the unit during the final months of BSB's existence. D2-MAC programmes could be picked up from the Scandinavian satellites during the early 1990s and viewed using modified receivers. Once transmissions ceased from these satellites, Squarials could be used to receive broadcasts from the French terrestrial relay satellites at 5.0°W.

BSB's alternative dishes were also successfully used to receive analogue transmissions from the Astra and Hot Bird satellites.

== Design and brand ==
BSB placed the Squarial at the heart of its advertising campaign, using the diamond shape throughout all of its channel logos and on screen presentation. This square/diamond image extended down to BSB's corporate logo and even printed and televisual advertising mediums. This led to the company's slogan (used throughout the company's existence) "It's smart to be square".

The unique appearance was a design first for satellite antennae, its flat plate measured only a few millimetres thick and the LNB unit protruded another 3 cm from the rear. It was built to a very high standard, featuring good quality plastics, weather resistant coatings and stainless steel mounting arm. Compared with the Amstrad-manufactured dishes offered by Sky — made from cheap metal — the Squarial offered a much more attractive, upmarket appearance.

== Alternatives ==
BSB offered two alternatives to the squarial, the cheaper more conventional-looking mini-dish format and the rounded-rectangle format dish.

The first revision was in the shape of a vertical ellipse of roughly 30 cm in diameter. The design employed a short LNB arm with a 'spike' design LNB operating at a frequency of 10 GHz. Essentially this design could be considered the forerunner to BSkyB's minidish. The second revision took on the appearance of a perfectly circular dish (around 25 cm in diameter), using a standard LNB at 10 GHz. In essence both function like a normal satellite dish, only scaled down.

== Bibliography ==
- Peter Chippindale, Suzanne Franks and Roma Felstein, Dished!: Rise and Fall of British Satellite Broadcasting, (London: Simon & Schuster Ltd, 1991).
