= Radio SHARK =

radio SHARK (the capitalization is a trademarked logotype) is a computer-controlled radio designed by Griffin Technology, introduced in late 2004. A second generation (radio SHARK 2) superseded it in 2007; they are distinguishable by color (the first model is white, the second is black). The radio connects the computer through a USB interface, which also supplies power to the radio. The device is shaped like a shark fin, which includes four internal LED lights attached to three pieces of clear plastic on each side of the device's case, two LEDs of which glow blue when plugged in, the other two of which glow red when recording radio.

Software designed for radio SHARK allows users to record radio programs at specific times and frequencies. The software also facilitates listening of "live" radio using time-shifting technology. Using the time-shifting features of the software, users can pause, rewind, and fast-forward "live" radio, in a manner similar to how users of TiVo or other digital video recorders can time-shift video. The radio SHARK uses the computer's hard drive to store audio files that allow for the time-shifting functionality.

The radio SHARK tunes in (Standard mode) 87.5 through 108.0 MHz FM, (Japanese mode) 76.0 through 90.0 MHz FM, and 522 through 1710 kHz AM. radio SHARK can tune both odd and even increments of FM frequencies, and either 9 or 10 kHz increments on AM.

Currently, radio SHARK is compatible with both Macintosh and Microsoft Windows. The Macintosh version of the radio SHARK software can load recorded audio files directly into iTunes, facilitating easy transfer of recorded radio programs to an iPod or CD. The product has now been discontinued by the manufacturer, who also says, "We do not support the use of this product in Lion, Mac OS 10.7 and later."
