= PVR-resistant advertising =

Form of advertising

PVR (DVR)-resistant advertising is a form of advertising which is designed specifically to remain viewable despite a user skipping through the commercials when using a device such as a TiVo or other digital video recorder. For instance, a black bar with a product's tagline and logo or the title of a promoted television program or film and its release date may appear on the top of the screen and remain visible much longer being fast-forwarded than a usual commercial.

This was used first by cable network FX's British network when advertising Brotherhood.
