= Sky Q =

British subscription television network

- Type: Pay television
- Country: Austria, Germany, Ireland, Italy, United Kingdom
- Availability: Satellite television and IPTV
- Broadcast area: Austria; Germany; Ireland; Italy; United Kingdom
- Parent: Sky
- Launch date: February 2016 (United Kingdom)
- Official website: Sky Q
- Replaced by: Sky Stream/Sky Glass

Sky Q is a subscription-based satellite television and entertainment service operated by British provider Sky, as part of its operations in Austria and Germany, Ireland, Italy and in the UK. The name also refers to the Sky Q set-top box.

Sky Q launched in 2016 replacing the previous Sky+ and Sky X services. Sky Q has been referred to as a "multimedia platform" that combines conventional television with on-demand and catch-up services, as well as third-party services. It includes a PVR set top box, a multiroom set top box, a dedicated broadband-connected "hub", and applications for mobile and desktop devices. As of April 2018, Sky Q was in 2.5 million homes in the UK, Ireland and Italy. In July 2018, Sky reported that there were 3.6 million Sky Q customers.

As of December 9, 2025, Sky Q is no longer available to purchase online as it begins to be replaced fully by the IPTV streaming platforms Sky Stream and Sky Glass, marking the end of satellite television sales for new Sky customers after 35 years.

== Launch ==
Sky Q was first announced by Sky UK in January 2016, and was released in the UK in March 2016.

Sky did not roll out Sky Q in Germany, Austria and Italy immediately, but released a modified version of the Sky Q set top box by Autumn 2016, named Sky+ Pro in Germany and Austria, and My Sky in Italy. Like Sky Q, the box is capable of UHD resolution and has a built-in Wi-Fi router, but it omits significant Sky Q features. Sky Italia later launched Sky Q in Italy in November 2017, and Sky Deutschland did so in Germany and Austria in May 2018. In contrast to the UK, Ireland and Italy (especially where Sky Italia launched Sky Q separately from My Sky), existing customers in Germany and Austria could receive Sky Q through a free software update on existing Sky+ Pro receivers.

== Hardware ==
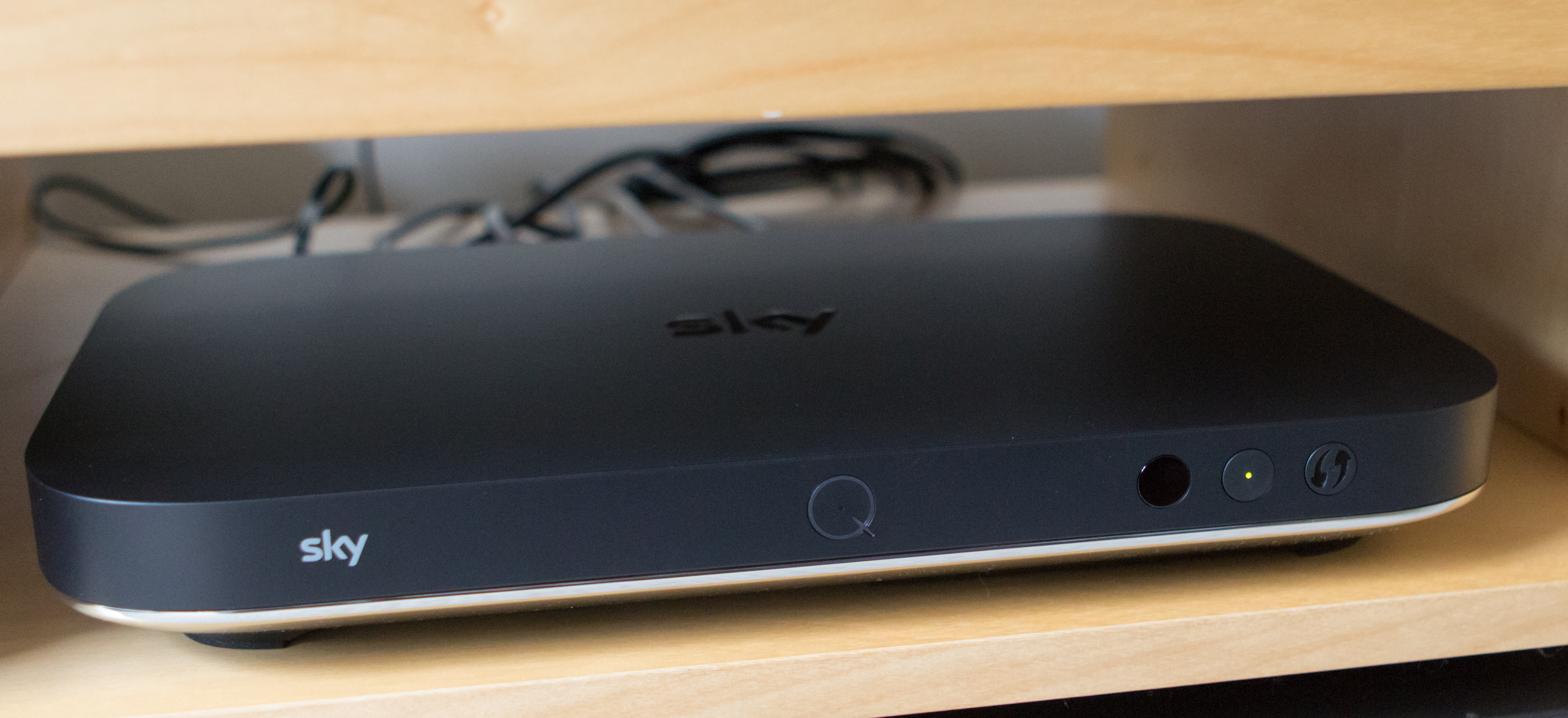
The Sky Q Silver box

The Sky Q "Silver" set top box (called "Platinum" in Italy) has a 2 terabyte hard disk and 12 satellite tuners, allowing up to six live TV channels to be recorded while watching a seventh. The box is capable of receiving and displaying 4K resolution "ultra-high-definition" (UHD) broadcasts, which were started by Sky in the UK in August 2016.

The standard Sky Q box has 1 terabyte of storage and 8 tuners, supporting broadcasts up to 1080p ("Full HD"). A third box, Sky Q Mini, acts as a secondary device without tuners or hard drives that merely networks to the main box to allow the Sky Q service to be used in other rooms, and can also be used as a Wi-Fi "extender" to provide stable broadband connections.

The Sky Q remote control is fully redesigned compared to the earlier Sky+ and Sky+ HD versions, and has a large touchpad for scrolling and selecting within the user interface. The latest version of the remote does not feature a touch interface anymore.

== Software ==
Using the Sky Q apps designed for the Android and iOS operating systems, Sky Q recordings at home can be watched on mobile devices on the go. Sky Q also offers access to box sets on Sky Store. In 2019, Sky teamed up with Netflix to offer that service with Sky Q for £3 per month, cheaper than a standard Netflix subscription, called "Ultimate On Demand". Disney+ is also fully integrated in Sky Q.

In August 2017, Sky added Dolby Atmos sound support on Sky Q. High-dynamic-range (HDR) broadcasts began on 27 May 2020.

Sky Group signed the deal with ViacomCBS (now Paramount Global) to launch Paramount+ in the United Kingdom, Ireland, Italy, Germany, Switzerland and Austria by 2022. The app is available on Sky Q, with Sky Cinema subscribers having access to Paramount+ at no charge.

== Sky Q over Internet ==
In January 2017, Sky plc's earnings report for 2016 indicated that it would launch a dish-less version of Sky Q service delivered through broadband Internet, with UK rollout projected for 2018. No further developments on the UK rollout have emerged since then.

The Austrian version, named Sky X, was launched in March 2019, replacing a version of Now TV operated in the country as Sky Ticket. The Italian version, named Sky Q Fibra, was launched in September 2019; unlike the Austrian Sky X, the Italian Sky Q Fibra co-exists with Now TV. Both Austrian and Italian Internet television services slightly differ from Sky Q satellite service in terms of features.

On 27 September 2019, Sky announced a new streaming box called Sky Stream, which launched on 18 October 2022. This however is now the new main option asides from Sky Glass, with Sky Q being phased out and becoming unavailable to purchase online.

== Reception ==
Sky Q mostly received positive critical reception in the UK. Alphr.com in April 2018 called the service "pure brilliance" and that it "keeps getting better", rating it 5 out of 5. TrustedReviews in April 2019 rated it 4.5 stars out of 5, praising the interface, on-the-go recordings, UHD resolution and Netflix integration, while criticising that it isn't cheap. Another review from 2019, by T3, also rated it 5 stars out of 5, with the verdict stating "Sky Q was already the best viewing experience money could buy and now, with Netflix seamlessly integrated into its UI, it has powered even further away from its rivals." The cons were stated to be lack of Amazon Prime Video and HDR. Stuff also rated it 5 stars out of 5 as of January 2019, commenting that it "works flawlessly and could change the way you watch TV", although adding that "Sky Q isn't for everyone (at least not yet)" and that for some people its "extra features will look like luxuries that might not be worth the extra expense". TechRadar rated it 4.5 stars out of 5, calling it the "best TV subscription service on the planet", with its main criticisms being lack of Amazon Prime Video and HDR. A What Hi-Fi? review from April 2019 gave it 5 stars out of 5, praising the content and multi-room ability, while criticising it for being expensive and the touchpad remote being "fiddly".

=== Awards ===
TrustedReviews named Sky Q the "Home Entertainment Product of the Year" in 2016, beating PlayStation 4 and Xbox One S. Sky Q was rated "Best TV platform" by T3 in its 2018 awards. Sky Q was the 2019 award winner by the What Hi-Fi? magazine.

== Advertising ==
Actor Idris Elba is used by Sky UK for its advertising campaigns.

== Planned phase-out in UK and Ireland ==
Currently, Sky is planning to phase out the Sky Q service in favour of Sky Glass and Sky Stream, with the Astra 28.2°E (which is soon nearing end of life) lease going until at least 2029, and Sky themselves making Stream and Glass the main options. A decision needs to be made in two years, or most likely their Sky Q and Sky+ HD services will end in UK and Ireland.

== See also ==
- Now
- Digibox (Sky's older set-top boxes)
