= Now (streaming service) =

British subscription television service

- Other names: Now TV (2012–2021)
- Original author: Sky Group
- Developers: United Kingdom & Italy NBCUniversal ((Sky Group)) United States Comcast ((Xfinity)) Germany Austria & Switzerland RTL Group (Sky Deutschland)
- Release: 17 July 2012; 14 years ago
- Available in: English (United Kingdom, Ireland and United States); German (Germany (as WOW, formerly as Sky Online and Sky Ticket), Austria (as SkyX) and Switzerland); Italian (Italy)
- Website: Official website

Now (formerly Now TV and often stylised as NOW) is a subscription over-the-top streaming television service launched in the United Kingdom in 2012. It is operated by Sky Group in Europe, and Xfinity in the US; both owned by the American media conglomerate Comcast. In German-speaking Europe, it is owned by the Europe media conglomerate RTL Group.

Now offers both live streaming and video-on-demand without a contract. The service offers "passes" for various types of content, for a monthly fee on a pay-as-you-go basis. Differing passes offer films, sports and entertainment from Sky such as material from Sky Atlantic and Sky Cinema, and from British and American licensed third-parties such as Fox. The service is available to consumers through retail Roku-based Now TV digital media players (in both set-top box and HDMI dongle form factors) as well as via an app on computers, various mobile devices, some game consoles and set-top boxes. It is separate from and not viewable through the Sky Go Internet service, or via Sky's digital satellite television service Sky Q.

== History and coverage ==
=== Now TV ===
Former Sky Ticket logo in Germany

Logo of WOW (Germany)

Logo of Sky X (Austria)

Now TV was unveiled by Sky UK in March 2012, and designed for people who have no existing pay TV subscription. Its official launch was on 17 July 2012, initially providing films, putting it in competition with Lovefilm and Netflix.

The Now TV service was later extended to other territories covered by the Sky Group. In 2014 a similar internet service called "Sky Online" was launched by Sky Deutschland in Germany and Austria, and by Sky Italia in Italy in 2015. In 2016, Sky Online in Germany and Austria was revamped as "Sky Ticket" and structured the same as Now TV in the UK, and was rebranded in Italy under the original British name of Now TV. On 26 April 2017, Now TV launched in Ireland. On 11 September 2017, the service launched as simply "Sky" in Spain, the first Sky-branded product in that country. In March 2019, Sky X launched in Austria, making use of a blend of Now TV and Sky Q elements, and replaced Sky Ticket, as an offering between Sky Ticket and the full TV service Sky Q. On 1 September 2020, Sky stopped offering the product in Spain.

In Summer 2016, Sky UK extended the brand to telecommunication services by launching contract-free budget broadband internet in the UK, initially named Now TV Combo, and from early 2018 branded as Now Broadband.

In early 2021, Now TV rebranded as NOW.

In Summer 2022, Sky Ticket rebranded to WOW.

=== Italy ===
Sky Italia launched the service in Italy as Sky Online in 2015. It was rebranded as Now TV in 2016 and later as NOW. In August 2023, NOW became the title sponsor of Serie C under a two-season agreement covering the 2023-24 and 2024-25 seasons. During the same period, Serie C matches were streamed live on NOW as part of Sky Italia's broadcasting-rights package.

=== Spain ===
Sky España was a service of Sky and supplied over-the-top pay television and video on demand service accessible only through the Internet created to compete with Movistar+, Netflix, and Amazon Prime Video in Spain.

Yoigo is an operator of Internet and mobile services which maintains an exclusive agreement that allows customers to the rate into Fibra + la Sinfín with unlimited fibre access to Sky España service for €6 per month.

The service ceased to be available on 1 September 2020. Some content had already disappeared prior to it closing on 10 August 2020.

Sky returned to the Spanish market in 2023 with the introduction of SkyShowtime.

=== United States ===
On 23 May 2023, Comcast (parent company of Sky Group) announced plans to launch a U.S. version of Now TV as part of its Xfinity cable and broadband unit, which will be priced at US$25 per-month and include linear cable networks and free ad-supported streaming television (FAST) services from Xumo Play and other partners.

== Content and channels ==
Upon its UK debut in 2012, Now TV offered only films at first, adding sports in March 2013, and entertainment channels in October 2013. Film and entertainment channels are accessed by paying a monthly fee, and sports on an ad-hoc basis ("pay as you go"). Unlike Sky's flagship satellite TV service, Now TV does not require a long-term contract.

Now TV offers "passes" with a specific set of content or channels that can be watched on demand or as live TV. The "Entertainment" pass has general entertainment content/channels from Sky itself (e.g. Sky Atlantic) and third-parties (e.g. Comedy Central), whilst the "Kids" pass covers children's networks such as Nickelodeon, and a "Sky Cinema" pass offers over a thousand films from Sky Cinema. There is also a dedicated "Hayu" pass, and a "Sports" pass (which offers a daily or monthly option), along with a sports pass solely for mobile devices to stream live Sky Sports channels.

The Now TV boxes and dongles have extra downloadable apps that provide access to free catch-up or streaming services such as BBC iPlayer, ITVX, and UKTV Play, as well as access to Sky Store, Netflix (added in late 2018), Peacock (added in November 2021), Sky Sports Box Office, Disney+ (added in April 2020) and YouTube. From Spring 2020, Now TV provided access to BT Sport, and at the same time Now TV became available for BT TV customers.

On 28 June 2022, National Geographic departed the service as its programming moved to Disney+. In its place, Now users had access to UKTV's mystery drama channel Alibi and NBC News Now, whilst customers with the Sky Cinema subscription package could access a range of films from Paramount+.

== List of channels on Now ==
=== Entertainment ===
- Sky One
- Sky Atlantic
- Sky Witness
- U&Alibi
- U&Gold
- Sky Comedy
- Comedy Central
- MTV
- Sky Documentaries
- Sky Crime
- Sky Nature
- Sky History
- Sky Sci-Fi
- Sky News
- Sky Arts

=== Films ===
- Sky Cinema Premiere
- Sky Cinema Feel Good
- Sky Cinema Hits
- Sky Cinema Action
- Sky Cinema Animation
- Sky Cinema Family
- Sky Cinema Comedy
- Sky Cinema Sci-Fi Horror
- Sky Cinema Thriller
- Sky Cinema Greats
- Sky Cinema Drama

=== Kids ===
- Nickelodeon
- Nick Jr.
- Nicktoons
- Cartoon Network
- Boomerang
- Cartoonito
- Sky Kids
- DreamWorks Channel (On Demand only)
- Moonbug Kids (On Demand only)

=== Sport ===
- Sky Sports News
- Sky Sports Main Event
- Sky Sports Premier League
- Sky Sports Football
- Sky Sports Cricket
- Sky Sports Golf
- Sky Sports F1
- Sky Sports Action
- Sky Sports +
- Sky Sports Racing
- Sky Sports Box Office
- Sky Sports Mix
- Sky Sports Tennis
- Sky Sports Extra

== Devices ==
Now is available on a number of platforms, providing access via both big-screen and small screen mobile devices (correct as of March 2025):

- PC and Mac via modern web browser (Chrome, Safari, Edge and Firefox are recommended)
- AirPlay on supported devices
- Android phones, tablets and TV via app.
- iOS 13 or later devices via app (iOS 12 or lower no longer supported).
- Amazon Fire devices
- Xbox One and Xbox Series X/S (Xbox 360 no longer supported)
- PlayStation 4 and PlayStation 5 (PlayStation 3 no longer supported)
- Roku LT (Purple), XS, 3 (Black), Streaming Stick
- Apple TV 4th generation and later (3rd gen no longer supported)
- Chromecast Gen 2 and later
- Hisense TV 2022 models with VIDAA 6.0 and later
- YouView including BT TV/TalkTalk TV Gen 2 and later (the full Now TV service was added on 21 February 2020)
- Sony Bravia most TVs manufactured since 2016
- LG selected smart TVs, Blu-ray players and sound bars from 2018 and later
- Samsung selected smart TVs manufactured since 2016
- Now TV proprietary devices (no longer sold, white boxes are no longer supported)

The service offers streams at up to 720p resolution (or up to 1080p resolution, when subscribed to Now TV HD Boost at an extra cost) depending on the playback device. It uses adaptive bitrate streaming.

=== Now TV hardware ===
In July 2013, Sky launched a white Now TV-branded Roku streaming box, allowing users to stream Now TV content to their television via an analogue baseband connection or an HDMI input. It retailed for £9.99. It has limited access to the Roku Channel Store and only a pre-approved list of channels can be downloaded. A number of third-party channels can be side-loaded to the device using its Developer Mode.

In August 2015, Sky launched the Now TV Box 2 (based around a 2015 Roku 2) in black. It offers the same content as the original Now TV (white) box, but has a faster processor, an Ethernet port alongside Wi-Fi, a USB port and an SD card slot (not functional by default), and is capable of outputting at full HD (1080p) resolution. Unlike the original Now TV Box, the Now TV Box 2 does not have an analogue audio/video output socket.

The Now TV Smart Box ("Smart Box with Freeview"), coloured black with a blue logo, was launched exclusively in the UK in July 2016. It includes access to Freeview channels through an aerial, via an internal DTT tuner that allows the user to pause (for up to 30 minutes) and rewind live TV.

In January 2018, Sky introduced the Now TV Smart Stick dongle which plugs directly into a TV's HDMI input and includes voice search. It was noted as the cheapest smart TV stick in the UK, costing £14.99 at launch compared to £39.99 for its rival Amazon Fire TV Stick.

The second generation Now TV Smart Box ("Smart Box with 4K") was introduced in September 2018 and is coloured black with a pink logo. It is smaller in size (mainly due to the removal of the Freeview TV tuner) and includes the voice search capability from the Smart Stick. This box is capable of streaming at 2160p (4K) resolution.

NOW announced late in 2021 that it is discontinuing all NOW hardware products.

Hardware specifications
	Now TV "White" Box	Now TV "Black" Box	Now TV Smart Box (1st Generation)	Now TV Smart Stick	Now TV Smart Box (2nd Generation)
Release Date	July 2013	August 2015	July 2016	February 2018	September 2018
End of Support	October 2020	N/A	N/A	N/A	N/A
UK Model Numbers	2400SK	4200SK; 4201UK	4500SK	3801	4631UK
Ireland Model Numbers	—N/a	4201IE	—N/a	3801	—N/a
Italy Model Numbers	—N/a	300338	—N/a	3801	—N/a
Remote control	Infrared with 13 buttons.	Infrared with 13 buttons.	Infrared with 13 buttons.	Wi-Fi Direct (point-anywhere) using 17 buttons. Infrared for television power and volume control using 3 buttons. Voice Search microphone.	
Wi-Fi	Single-band 802.11 (b/g/n compatible) with WEP, WPA and WPA2 support.	Dual-band 802.11 (a/b/g/n compatible) with WEP, WPA and WPA2 support.		Dual-band 802.11 (a/b/g/n/ac compatible) with WEP, WPA, WPA2 support, and Hotel Connect.	
Ethernet ports	—N/a	1x 100BASE-TX		—N/a	1x 1000BASE
USB	—N/a	USB Type A socket, not functional.		Micro USB Type B socket as power input only.	—N/a
Secure Digital	—N/a	microSD, not functional		—N/a	microSD, not functional
Terrestrial TV tuner	—N/a	—N/a	Freeview and Freeview HD	—N/a	—N/a
Pause and Rewind live TV	—N/a	—N/a	Freeview and Freeview HD (up to 30 minutes).	Now TV pass live television channels (up to 30 minutes).	
Video Outputs (all via HDMI)	480i; 480p; 720p	720p; 1080p			720p; 1080p; 2160p at 30fps or 60fps; 2160p HDR at 30fps or 60fps
Audio outputs	Analogue stereophonic: mini-jack to left audio/ right /composite video RCA.; Digital over HDMI: 5.1 surround sound pass-through and stereophonic sound.	Digital over HDMI: 7.1 and 5.1 surround sound pass-through.			
Central Processing Unit	Single-core	Dual-core	Quad-core		
Dimensions	3.31 in × 3.31 in × 0.91 in (84 mm × 84 mm × 23 mm)	3.50 in × 3.50 in × 0.98 in (89 mm × 89 mm × 25 mm)	6.50 in × 6.50 in × 0.81 in (165 mm × 165 mm × 20.5 mm)	3.31 in × 0.80 in × 0.50 in (84 mm × 20.3 mm × 12.6 mm)	4.92 in × 4.92 in × 0.83 in (125 mm × 125 mm × 21 mm)
Weight	3.00 oz (85 g)	4.97 oz (141 g)	15.24 oz (432 g)	0.71 oz (20 g)	7.83 oz (222 g)
Power Input	5.2 Volt – 1.0 Amps via supplied AC power adaptor.	5.99 Volt – 2 Amps via supplied AC power adaptor.	12 Volt – 2 Amps via supplied AC power adaptor.	5 Volt – 1.0 Amps via USB port/supplied AC power adaptor.	5.99 Volt – 2 Amps via supplied AC power adaptor.
Power Consumption	Typical when streaming video: less than 2 Watts.	Typical when streaming video: less than 3.5 Watts.	Typical when active: less than 14.2 Watts.; Typical when in active standby: less than 9.5 Watts.; Typical when in passive standby: less than 0.6 Watts.	Typical when streaming high definition content: less than 3.5 Watts.	Typical when streaming ultra high definition content: less than 9 Watts.

== Reception ==
As of Q4 2018, Now TV had a 10% share in the UK OTT subscription market, placing it third behind Netflix and Amazon Prime Video.

== Trademark disputes ==
Before its launch, Hong Kong–based PCCW filed trademark complaints about British Sky Broadcasting's (BSkyB) Now TV service. In October 2012, a High Court judgment in London ruled that BSkyB did not infringe PCCW's rights regarding the Now TV name.
