= Tablo (DVR) =

Digital video recorder for broadcast TV

Nuvyyo
- Trade name: Tablo
- Type: Subsidiary
- Industry: Electronics
- Founded: February 5, 2010; 16 years ago
- Headquarters: 555 Legget Dr, Tower B Suite 836, Kanata, Ontario, Canada
- Key people: Grant Hall, Founder and CEO
- Parent: E. W. Scripps Company
- Website: www.tablotv.com

Tablo is a digital video recorder (DVR) for over-the-air (OTA) broadcast television signals which is controlled by a streaming device, tablet or web-based application. Tablo receives free OTA signals from an antenna, allowing the user to either watch live TV or record programs to an external USB hard drive or internal storage, depending on the model. Tablo can connect to a home network through either Wi-Fi or Ethernet connections.

Tablo is designed and developed by Nuvyyo, a Kanata, Ontario-based technology company, formed by veterans of the local technology scene, which launched in 2010.

Some of Tablo's competitors are Channel Master, HDHomeRun and TiVo.

In 2022, the company was purchased by E. W. Scripps, a television broadcasting conglomerate, for $14 million USD.
