= On Demand (Sky) =

Video on demand services from Sky UK

- Original author: British Sky Broadcasting
- Developer: Sky Group
- Release: 27 March 2007; 19 years ago
- Final release: 2004 / 2019
- Preview release: 2002 / 2004
- Operating system: Sky+
- Platform: TV
- Available in: English
- Type: Video on demand
- Website: www.sky.com/shop/tv/ultimate-on-demand/

On Demand was the brand name of a range of video on demand services from Sky UK designed to compete with rival companies such as Virgin TV or BT TV as well as internet television services such as Amazon Prime Video and Netflix.

On Demand, previously called Sky Anytime, has been available in various forms including: a PC version using a peer-to-peer platform over broadband Internet connection, a version for users of 3G mobile telephones, a push video on demand service for subscribers equipped with a Sky+ HD set-top box or the PVR3 version of the Sky+ set top box and a pull video-on-demand service.

Sky no longer use the "On Demand" brand for their current Sky TV on demand services on Sky Q, Sky Go, Sky+ HD, Sky Glass and Sky Stream.

== History ==
On 27 March 2007, Sky launched its Sky Anytime service for owners of Sky HD set top boxes. The service is a Push video on demand (push VoD) system similar to Top Up TV's TV Favourites, where the Sky+ PVR automatically records programmes transmitted over-night. The service uses 140 GB of previously reserved disk space on Sky+ HD boxes hard-disk space whilst on standard Sky+ boxes it uses 80 GB of the hard-disk space. The service is intended to provide a catch-up of a selection of the last week's programming. The service was launched on PVR3 Sky+ boxes manufactured by Pace and Amstrad on 24 April 2007. The update for Thomson boxes was delayed because of technical difficulties, it was finally launched for Thomson boxes on 29 May 2007.

On 30 July 2009, Sky confirmed the launch of a 'pull' video-on-demand service for 2010, adding to the Sky Anytime 'push' VOD service. On 29 April 2010, Sky revealed that it will name its video-on-demand service Sky Anytime+. "It will be a broad offering at launch with a large range of content across the range of content that we show," CEO Jeremy Darroch said. "(It will feature) progressive download using the broadband return pathway and the hard disk in a combined way. All of the boxes are VOD-ready, so we'll be able to roll it out to all of the box population." Sky Anytime+ began a staggered roll out from 26 October 2010, The majority of Sky's customers were able to receive the service by the end of 2010. In the phased rollout, all remaining receivers were enabled in the first part of 2011. A background over-the-air update in 2010 upgraded all existing Sky+ HD boxes with the software needed to run Anytime+.

In July 2011, Sky Anytime was added to Virgin Media with content from Sky Living, following on from Sky's purchase of Virgin Media Television. Additional content began rolling out on 11 October 2011 ahead of a full launch the following day. Programming is available in both standard and high definition from Sky1, Sky Arts, Sky Living, Sky Movies, Sky News and Sky Sports. However HD content from premium channels is limited to TiVo subscribers. Sky Anytime content also became available through Virgin Media Player online on 28 October 2011 but not on mobile devices.

On 6 September 2012, Sky announced that Sky Anytime and Anytime+ would be merged and rebranded as On Demand, along with the addition of a Catch-up TV section. This occurred on 26 September 2012, with Sky Anytime becoming a Showcase section and Sky Anytime+ being split into Library, Movies and Sky Store, all on the Sky Guide of the satellite receivers.

On 11 October 2012, the download component of the on Demand service was activated in Ireland, where Anytime+ had previously been unavailable.

Sky no longer uses the "On Demand" brand name for their on-demand services. Instead (as of 2019) the on demand content on Sky Q boxes are categorised on the home screen as: Catch Up TV, Sky Cinema, Sky Box Sets, Home, Sports, Kids and Music.

== Content ==
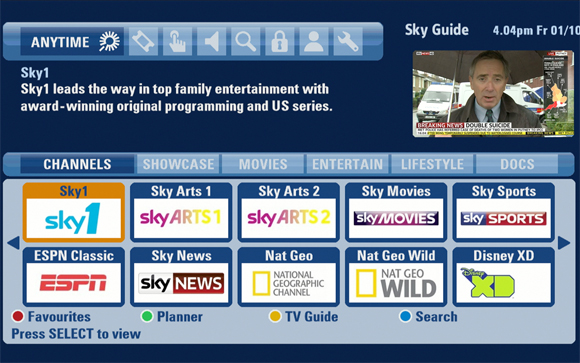
Sky Anytime+ at launch.

On Demand offers around 1,000 hours of content from Sky 1, Sky Atlantic, Sky Arts, Sky Living, Sky Movies and Sky Sports, along with material from other broadcasters, such as the Disney Channel, ESPN, HBO, National Geographic and UKTV. A "key focus" for the service is movies, with around 500 made available at the launch of Sky Anytime+. On Demand is offered without charge to all Sky customers with Sky+ HD boxes, although access to premium content such as sport and movies will depend on the subscriber's package. All Anytime+ content was initially only available in standard definition, with high definition VOD content via Sky Anytime. However, Sky's head of TV services Kathryn Downward said that Anytime+ could offer HD content in the future and 3D on-demand was "definitely something we are considering" and HD content was later made available. So far, more HD content has been added from both Sky and the BBC. On 1 September 2011, a further 10 channels were added to the service.

ITV Player became accessible through the main Sky Anytime+ menu as well as a dedicated ITV Player section on 31 January 2012, featuring archive content. The catch-up TV section of on Demand launched on 26 September 2012, featuring ITV Player, Demand 5, Sky TV (Sky1, Sky Arts, Sky Atlantic and Sky Living), Sky Sports and Sky Movies. BBC iPlayer arrived on 30 October 2012, while 4oD launched on 18 March 2013.

== Downloads ==
Download content in on Demand is supported by progressive download, meaning it downloads in the background while the user is watching. Standard definition movies are typically around 1.3GBs, which takes about one minute to start playing on 2 Mbit/s+ connections, but around 40mins on sub-1 Mbit/s lines. Downloads can also be paused if the user wants to free up their broadband line for another task. However, Anytime+ was initially only made available to Sky customers with a Sky Broadband connection, meaning anyone on another internet service provider missed out. Downward said that the reasoning behind this strategy is to enable the "optimum experience" for customers and make it easier to manage technical issues. On 20 March 2012, Sky Anytime+ was made available across all broadband providers.

Content requiring a download is managed in the existing Sky+ Planner tool. Users are able to trigger multiple downloads of content at one time, which all funnels into the Planner. The system handles one download at a time, with users able to shuffle their download list to prioritise different content. If users are watching Sky television, then the system also pops up a reminder to indicate when selected content is available to watch. Among notable new features on the user interface is a 'play' icon, which indicates that content is available to play immediately. However, any content not carrying the 'play' icon will require time to download before running entirely without buffering.

A Wi-Fi adapter has also been made available, manufactured by Netgear, rebadged by Sky as the "Sky Wireless Connector".

== Criticisms ==
Unlike BT TV, On Demand's download content will contribute towards the user's broadband data limit. Downward said, "To us any internet usage is still internet usage – however it's being delivered, if we did [differentiate between Anytime+ data and normal internet use] it could be confusing between what isn't and what is." Customers who sign up for on Demand and are on the Sky Broadband Everyday Lite package are warned about how much content (180 minutes) they can consume before they hit their cap and anyone with Anytime+ that does exceed the cap is reminded that the service is contributing to their data usage.

The download service was not available in Ireland upon launch but the service was made available on 11 October 2012.

== Sky Go ==
Sky Go (formerly known as 'Sky Player', 'Sky Anytime on PC' and 'Sky By Broadband') was launched in January 2006. The service allows customers to download video onto their PC through a broadband internet connection. As of November 2008 the software also allows the live streaming of selected Sky TV channels. The VoD content comprises sport highlights, news, feature-length movies and TV programmes. On 6 July 2011, Sky Player and Sky Mobile TV services were merged and rebranded as Sky Go.

== The Big New Preview Show ==
The Big New Preview Show was a programme shown on Sky Anytime, presented by Jason Barlow, which advertises the shows coming up on the following week. It was updated each week on a Sunday.

Sky HD viewers received a slightly different programme, The Big New HD Preview Show, which showcased upcoming high definition content on both Sky Anytime on TV and the linear HD channels.
