= Freesat+ =

British consumer brand

- Company type: Free-to-air channels digital TV recorders brand
- Industry: Media
- Products: Digital TV recorder

Freesat+ is a consumer brand introduced to raise consumer awareness and promote sales of Freesat-capable digital TV recorders, otherwise known as personal video recorders. Freesat+ affords users similar features that are available with competitor services such as Sky+ and Freeview+.

== Background ==
Freesat+ offers a PVR functionality for Freesat, which offers a greater choice of channels compared to Freeview, including a greater number of HD channels, without the subscriptions of Sky or Virgin Media. Freesat also offers higher rates of coverage than Freeview.

== Manufacturers ==
Freesat do not manufacture the units itself, but will award the Freesat+ label to manufacturers that are able to meet a series of specifications that have been drawn up by the UK's Digital TV Group.

Many manufacturers provide Freesat+ set-top boxes such as: Humax, Manhattan, Bush, Sagemcom, Goodmans and others.

== See also ==
- High-definition television in the United Kingdom
- ETSI TS 102 323 V1.4.1 (2010-01), Chapter 11: "Accurate recording" and Annex A: "Example recorder behaviour"
