= What Hi-Fi? =

Global technology news and reviews website and magazine

- Cover of the December 2024 issue
- Editor: Content director: Joe Cox Editor-in-Chief: Alastair Stevenson Magazing editor: Jonathan Evans Art editor: Andrew Cottle Production editor: Chris Burke Deputy editor: Andy Madden Managing editor: Becky Roberts Technical editor: Ketan Bharadia TV and AV editor: Tom Parsons Hi-Fi and Audio editor: Kashfia Kabir Staff writers: Lewis Empson, Harry McKerrell, Robyn Quick
- Categories: Consumer technology magazine and website
- Frequency: 13 issues per year, daily website
- Format: Digital and print
- Circulation: 22,873 average per issue 67,096,093 global users (Jan-Dec 2021)
- Publisher: Future plc
- Founded: 1976
- First issue: October 1976
- Country: Worldwide
- Website: whathifi.com
- ISSN: 0309-3336

What Hi-Fi? is a website and magazine published by Future. It is a buying guide for consumer electronics, featuring news, reviews and features on hi-fi, home cinema, television and home audio. The website is updated daily, while the magazine is published thirteen times per year.

What Hi-Fi? writes about stereo speakers, TVs, amplifiers, headphones, soundbars, projectors, tablets and turntables. Brands featured across the website and magazine include Bowers & Wilkins, KEF, Naim, LG and Sony.

Reviews are written for a global audience in-house at dedicated testing facilities, currently found in London, Reading and Bath. The magazine has nine international editions, and its publisher claims that its total readership is in excess of one million per issue. What Hi-Fi? hired its first full-time US-based writer in 2023.

The What Hi-Fi? website has a consistently updated library of audio and video hardware reviews, plus news, features, advice and opinion from the editorial team. In the course of 2017, the website reached over 24 million unique users.

What Hi-Fi? was sold to Future Publishing by Haymarket in multi-brand deal for £14m.

As of November 2024, Future Tech was the number one publisher in the Comscore 'News/Information - Technology News' category, while What Hi-Fi? was the 8th biggest UK consumer technology title by unique visitors and 36th in the US.

== History ==
The first issue of What Hi-Fi? magazine was published by Haymarket Media Group in the UK in 1976, costing 35p and promising to be “the only magazine to list and price every available hi-fi unit”.

The magazine was focused on hi-fi equipment for a mainstream audience, recommending turntables and cartridges for people to use at home, but also covered “Sound & Vision” products, including the first Video Recorder machines and later televisions and home cinema products.

The brand now reaches a global audience, with the UK, US and Australia the largest territories.

== Brand extensions ==
=== What Hi-Fi? Awards ===
The What Hi-Fi? Awards began in 1983 and have announced the brand's favourite products of the year with a special issue of the magazine, the Awards issue. The What Hi-Fi? Awards are also announced and hosted on the website. In 2022, the What Hi-Fi? Awards featured 109 winners across 26 product categories.

=== Hall of Fame ===
A selection of the brand's favourite products of all time are also presented in the What Hi-Fi? Hall of Fame, which includes products launched in 1976 and right up until the present day.

Notable products include the Linn LP12 turntable, the Sony Walkman, Acoustic Energy AE1 speakers, Mission Cyrus One amplifier, Sennheiser HD600 headphones, Sky+, Sonos, the Bowers & Wilkins Zeppelin wireless speaker, the Apple iPhone, Pioneer Kuro plasma TVs, the Naim Mu-so, the ATC SCM11 loudspeaker, KEF LS50 Wireless speaker system and the Sony WH-1000XM4 wireless headphones.

=== Australian hi-fi magazines ===
In 2020, the website began hosting reviews and features written by Australian Hi-Fi and Sound+Image magazines, following their acquisition by Future.

=== US expansion ===
In 2023, the website hired its first US-based full-time staff member and continued to increase its coverage of US products, technology and deals.
