= Sky+ =

UK satellite video service, 2001–2016

- Sky+ logo, c. September 2003-January 2006

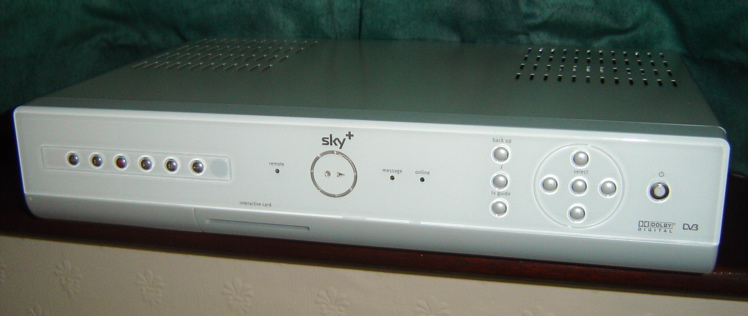
- A Sky+ set top box
- Inception: August 2001
- Manufacturer: Sky Group
- Last production year: 2016

Sky+ (pronounced Sky Plus) is a discontinued personal video recorder (PVR) and subscription service from the satellite television provider Sky in the UK and Ireland. Launched in September 2001, it allows customers to record, pause and instantly rewind live TV. The system performs these functions using an internal hard drive inside the Sky+ set top box, an upgrade over the standard Digibox.

On 25 August 2001, the Sky+ demonstration was added to the Sky Guide demonstration, and was shown on Sky Welcome (Channel 998), which lasted for 15 minutes. A demo of the Sky+ box was shown on the Sky Customer Channel (Channel 999).

Originally a Sky+ subscription cost £10 per month - this fee was discontinued for subscribers from 1 July 2007. By July 2002 the service attracted 25,000 subscribers, and by 30 September 2009, there were 5.9 million customers with Sky+. Sky+ was also released in Italy, Germany and Austria.

During its lifetime its chief competitors in the UK market were Freeview+, Freesat+, BT Vision, and Virgin Media's V+ and TiVo. In the Republic of Ireland, Sky+ competed with Virgin Media Horizon TV and Saorview. In October 2016, Sky stopped selling the Sky+ subscription service, replacing it with Sky Q, although users of Sky+ can continue using their legacy box.

== Technical information ==
- Combined digital satellite receiver/decoder and personal video recorder (PVR).
- Twin digital satellite tuners – for connection to identical independent feeds from Astra 28.2°E. Allows simultaneous recording/viewing or recording of 2 channels at once.
- The set-top box middleware is provided by OpenTV, but the EPG and all the software extensions that manage the PVR functions are produced by NDS under the name of XTV PVR.
- Sky+ has its own electronic programme guide made by Sky. From here, users can see what programmes are on in the next seven days. The current EPG software version (as of July 2010) is Sky+ 5.08.6.

=== Versions ===
There have been various versions of Sky+:

- Sky+ 40 GB (discontinued) – First version of Sky+, which costed £300. An average of twenty hours recording time. The first generation of boxes (referred to as a PVR1s within Sky) were manufactured exclusively by Pace for the UK and Ireland market. The second generation of 40 GB boxes (referred to as PVR2s), were manufactured by both Amstrad and Pace.
- Sky+ 80 GB (discontinued) – Now officially and colloquially referred to as Sky+, this third generation of box (PVR3) are manufactured by Altech UEC, Pace, Amstrad and Thomson. Launched in September 2005 as standard Sky+ box, the box has an average of forty hours recording time. The box has a 160 GB hard drive installed, however half of this (80 GB) is reserved for use by the Sky Anytime TV service. The box is known internally at Sky as a PVR3 or Sky+ 80/80.
- Sky+ 160 GB (discontinued) – Referred to as Sky+160, this box was manufactured by Thomson, with the model number DSI6210, and was available only in the UK. Launched in the autumn of 2004 as Premium Sky+ box and a cost of £399, it has an average of eighty hours recording time. The box has a 160 GB hard drive installed, and all 160 GB is available for user recordings. The Sky Anytime TV service is not available on this box. The Sky+160 box was discontinued during the first quarter of 2006.
- Sky+ 250 GB
- Sky+ (HD) 250 GB – Made by different companies, including Pace, Samsung and Amstrad. Formerly with a smaller hard drive (160 GB). Presumably upgraded with the increasing numbers of HD channels. Still containing dual tuners and the Sky Anytime service, although this does not use personal recording space as the hard drive is in fact 500GB with a separate 250GB partition dedicated to the Anytime service.
- Sky+ (HD) 1 TB (discontinued) – The same as the smaller hard-drive HD box, however a four-times larger hard drive. Similar in appearance however silver parts are replaced with black making a much slicker looking box.
- Sky+ (HD) 2 TB – The same as the smaller hard-drive HD box, replacing the 1TB version however an eight-times larger hard drive. Similar in appearance however silver parts are replaced with black making a much slicker looking box.

Although the different generations of the Sky+ box look similar, they have minor external differences (viewing card positions etc.) and significant internal differences. By December 2005, Sky+ 80 GB boxes manufactured by Pace, Amstrad and Thomson were being installed. Many people have reported various problems with the different boxes. A persistent complaint is that early Amstrad 80 GB models are noisy in operation. Amstrad was bought out by Sky in 2007, and decided to bring in its satellite receiver development and manufacturing in-house.

=== Sky+ remote ===
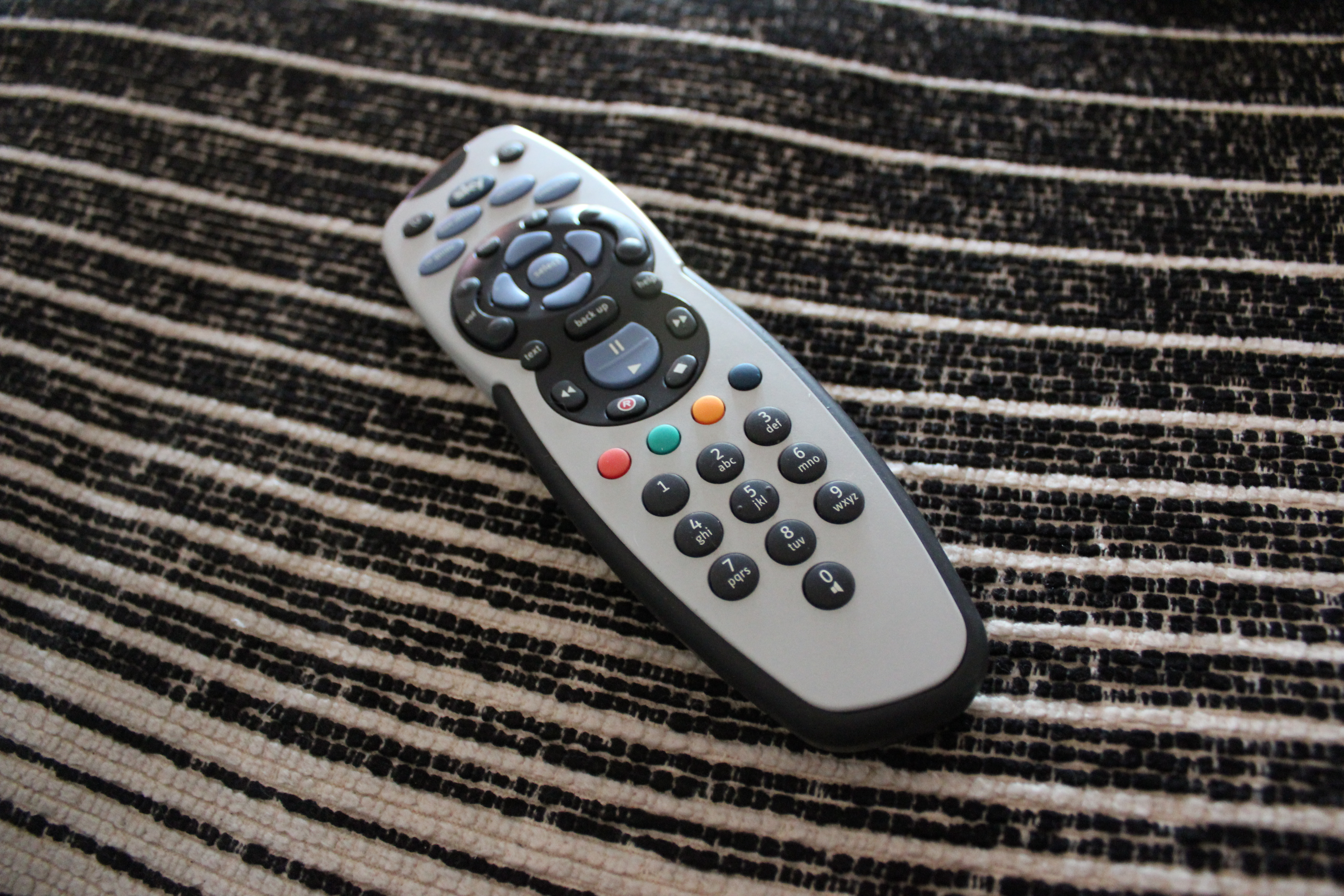
Sky+ remote control

A typical Sky+ remote control is similar to a typical Sky remote, but provides controls for the extra features, e.g. rewinding the programme, record, play or pause, fast forward and stopping playback of the programme. The Sky+ remote is silver coloured or beige for the early remotes that were issued with 40GB Boxes (like the set top box) rather than the dark blue of the normal and original Sky remote.

The Sky+ remote will work with a Sky+ HD Box automatically but does require additional tuning to work with a Digibox.

=== Remote recording ===
In July 2006, Sky added remote recording functionality to Sky+ in the UK and Ireland. This enables customers to schedule recordings when they are away from home via a mobile telephone. Programmes can be added to the planner either by downloading an application to the mobile phone, called 'Sky Go', or by sending as SMS with details of the programme name, time, date and channel. In February 2007, Sky added remote recording via the sky.com website, so customers can program their STB from any web browser using an EPG similar to that found on the Sky+ system.

=== Sky Anytime TV service ===
On 2 January 2007, Sky announced plans to release a service, named Sky Anytime to Sky+ subscribers. The service is a Push-Video on Demand (push-VoD) system similar to Top Up TV Anytime, where the Sky+ PVR automatically records programmes transmitted over-night. The service, will be available to over 2 million Sky+ subscribers, using reserved space on the PVR's hard drive.

The service works as a catch-up service for the best programmes of the week. The service launched some time in March 2007, and is available to owners of Sky HD and newer Sky+ boxes.

== Critical reception ==
Following a six-month trial of the service, Guy Dixon wrote in PC Advisor magazine that he found Sky+ very easy to use and particularly praised the Series Link feature, describing it as a "killer app". He also described the ability to pause and rewind live TV as a "novelty...that wore off after a couple of days" and criticised the inability to customise the EPG's standard channel list. He also questioned whether both the high cost of the hardware and extra subscription fee would harm its success and suggested Sky should waive the hardware and installation fees. Sky would later offer reduced cost hardware, and began to waive the extra subscription fee to its premium channel subscribers, and subsequently all subscribers.

BSkyB spent upward of £20 million advertising the new service. In 2004, Sky began to waive the service fee to customers who were subscribers of their premium sport and/or movie channels, and from 2007, the charge was dropped for all subscribers. Sky+ is also built into Sky+ HD digiboxes.

A number of hackers have attempted to upgrade the Sky+ receiver, primarily through the installation of larger hard drives to increase recording capacity; instruction manuals and tool kits to do this are widely available. Installing a larger hard drive in the unit is no harder than in a normal PC, but the Sky+ receiver is sensitive to the type of disk installed. Disks with low power requirements and fast spin up times are most likely to be compatible. Hard drives (consumer electronics drives) designed specifically by manufacturers for use with PVRs provide a considerably lower noise level and produce significantly less heat, reducing the need for internal fans to operate as frequently and again cutting down on noise generation.

Software is also freely available which facilitates the migration of recorded material from the hard drive to a replacement. However, as of December 2010, this software is incapable of migrating recorded material from a standard definition Sky+ Box to a Sky+ HD box. It is thought that this is due to the planner databases used for Sky+ and Sky+ HD being incompatible.

== See also ==
- Sky (company)
- Sky+ HD
