= Minidish =

Small-sized satellite dish used by Sky and Freesat

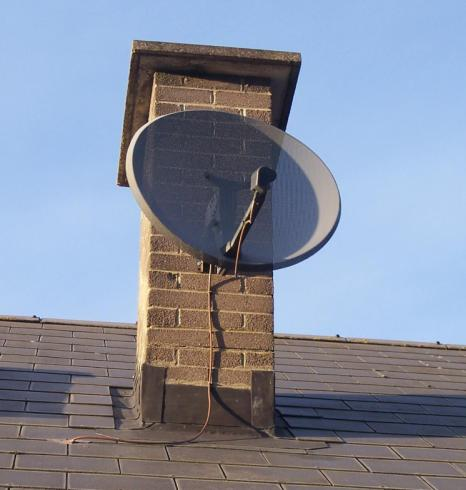
Zone 2 (57cm) minidish

The Minidish is the tradename used for the small-sized satellite dish used by Freesat and Sky. The term has entered the vocabulary in the UK and Ireland as a generic term for a satellite dish, particularly small ones.

The Minidish is an oval, mesh satellite dish capable of reflecting signals broadcast in the upper X band and K_{u} band. Two sizes exist:

- "Zone 1" dishes are issued in southern and Northern England and parts of Scotland and were 43 cm vertically prior to 2009; newer mark 4 dishes are approximately 50 cm
- "Zone 2" dishes are issued in elsewhere (Wales, Northern Ireland, Republic of Ireland, Scotland and northern England), which are 57 cm vertically.

The Minidish uses a non-standard connector for the LNB, consisting of a peg about 4 cm (1.6 in) in width and 7.5 mm (0.30 in) in height prior to the mark 4 dishes introduced in 2009, as opposed to the 40 mm collar. This enforces the use of Sky-approved equipment, but also ensures that a suitable LNB is used. Due to the shape of the dish, an LNB with an oval feedhorn is required to get full signal.
