= Sky+ HD =

UK satellite video service, 2006–2016

Sky + HD
- Owner: Sky Group
- Parent: Sky Group
- Launch date: 22 May 2006; 20 years ago
- Dissolved: October 2016; 9 years ago
- Official website: www.sky.com/products/ways-to-watch/sky-plus-hd/
- Replaced by: Sky Q

Sky+ HD was the brand name of the HDTV service launched by Sky plc on 22 May 2006 in the United Kingdom and Ireland to enable high definition channels on Sky to be viewed. For the first two years after launch, the service was branded Sky HD. The service requires the user to have a Sky+ HD Digibox and a HD ready TV. A subscription to the original HD pack carries an extra fee of £10.25 (€15.00 in Ireland) a month in addition to the standard Sky subscription, allowing customers to view HD channels corresponding to the channel packs subscribed to. Additional Pay-Per-View events on Sky Box Office HD are not available to customers unless they subscribe to the Sky HD pack.

As of June 2014, subscription numbers for Sky+HD stood at over 5.2 million, an increase from 4.8 million the year before.

From October 2016, Sky+ HD is no longer being offered as it was replaced by Sky Q. Existing customers can continue their subscription with Sky+ HD.

== History ==
Launched in May 2006, Sky HD brought high-definition television to the consumer market, initially consisting of nine HD channels. Prices on launch were announced as £299 for a HD set-top box, with an additional £10 a month HD subscription on top of any existing packages. Customers who pre-ordered by paying a deposit before 6 April 2006 were the first to receive the service, with installations starting on 21 May 2006 following over 40,000 advance orders of the service; the number of Sky+HD pre-orders surpassed the total sales in the first year of Sky+. The HD package launched with a one-year minimum subscription duration.

The launch line-up consisted of Sky One HD, Sky Arts HD, Sky Movies 9 HD, Sky Movies 10 HD, Sky Sports HD, Discovery HD, National Geographic Channel HD, Sky Box Office HD 1 and Sky Box Office HD 2 (now Sky Movies Box Office).

In March 2009, customers started being offered the Sky+ HD box as standard, with the HD package being optional at the same subscription price. The Sky+ box was subsequently withdrawn, meaning the Sky+ HD became part of a standard installation. As of late 2013, the £10.25/month HD pack stopped being offered to new customers, instead suggesting customers subscribe to the Family package, then carrying a £5/month premium over the cost of the regular Variety package. Access to HD versions of Sky Sports and Sky Movies requires a separate HD pack subscription, priced at £5.25 per month.

Sky+ recording facilities are included as part of a standard Sky TV subscription package, yet entails a fee of £10.25/month if a customer does not subscribe to any Sky TV package. Viewers who do not take a subscription Sky TV package or the Sky+ service will still receive all free SD and HD channels, but cannot use the recording facilities. Uptakers of the subscription-free Freesat from Sky service are provided with a recorder-less box branded 'SkyHD' rather than Sky+ HD, given SkyHD boxes provided by Freesat from Sky do not contain hardware for recording.

As of November 2016, Sky offered over 50 HD channels, more than any competitor. Numerous FTA HD channels are available which do not require a subscription, only an HD capable digibox such as the Sky+ HD box, including BBC One HD, BBC Two HD and Channel 4 HD.

== On Demand ==
On 27 March 2007, Sky launched its Sky Anytime on TV Push-Video on Demand service for owners of Sky+ HD set top boxes. Programmes in high definition and standard definition are recorded overnight to a reserved 140GB of disk space, to give the effect of video on demand.

This has also been used to bring viewers high-definition programmes from channels that at the time didn't broadcast in HD. These have included Sky News (Technofile, Diana: The Last Word), Disney Channel (High School Musical 2) and Nickelodeon (iCarly).

== Set top boxes ==
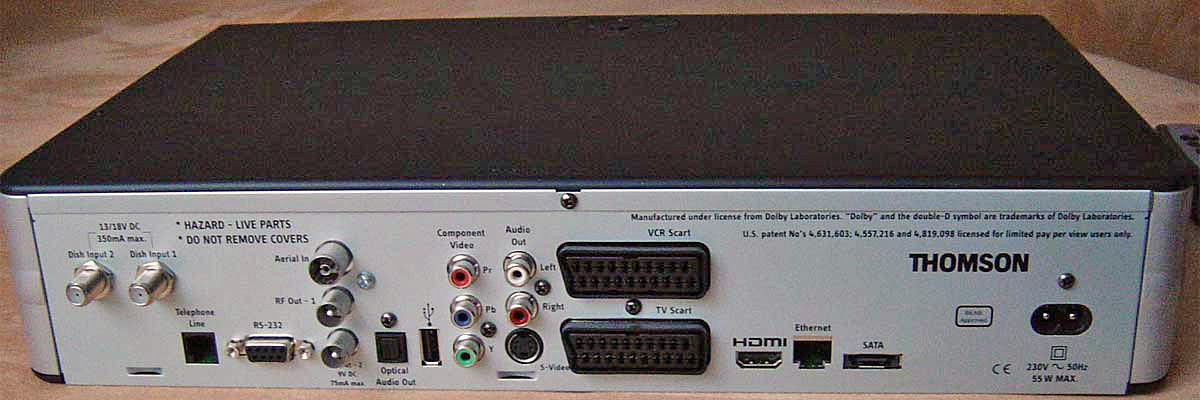
An original Sky+ HD Digibox (V.1) backpanel

The first generation of Sky+ HD Digibox were produced by Thomson, with Sky subsequently adding Samsung, Pace and Amstrad as manufacturers afterwards. In 2009, a manufacturing fault led to a batch of up to 90,000 units manufactured by Pace requiring replacement; Sky offered customers 3 months free HD pack subscription for the inconvenience.

For connectivity with HD ready televisions, the box outputs via a HDMI connector (adapters to Digital Visual Interface are available). The box is High-bandwidth Digital Content Protection (HDCP) compliant. Sky boxes manufactured prior to January 2008 also had analogue component connections (YPbPr), but as the HDCP copy protection cannot be applied to this type of output it was no longer included. Traditional standard-definition (SD) connections are available via SCART and S-Video. All programming is currently output from both HDMI and SD connections, although individual broadcasters have the option to require HDCP (and therefore HDMI) in the future.

All HD channels are broadcast in 1080i format (though the box can be set to scale this to 720p if the user wishes), using the H.264/MPEG-4 AVC compression standard, from Astra 2A, Astra 2E, Astra 2F and Eutelsat 28A satellites at 28.2°E and 28.5°E in a new DVB transmission standard, DVB-S2. BBC HD was initially broadcast using DVB-S but switched to DVB-S2 on 6 June 2011.

The Version 5 EPG (electronic program guide) is almost identical to the one found on Sky+, with the exception being that by pressing TV Guide and then number 2 on the remote control, listings for only the HD channels are shown. An update was sent to the HD boxes early on 20 March 2007, which also included code for Sky Anytime (now OnDemand). Version 8 of the Sky Guide, dubbed the Sky+ HD guide, included a Mini TV, improved search functions and a refreshed interface.

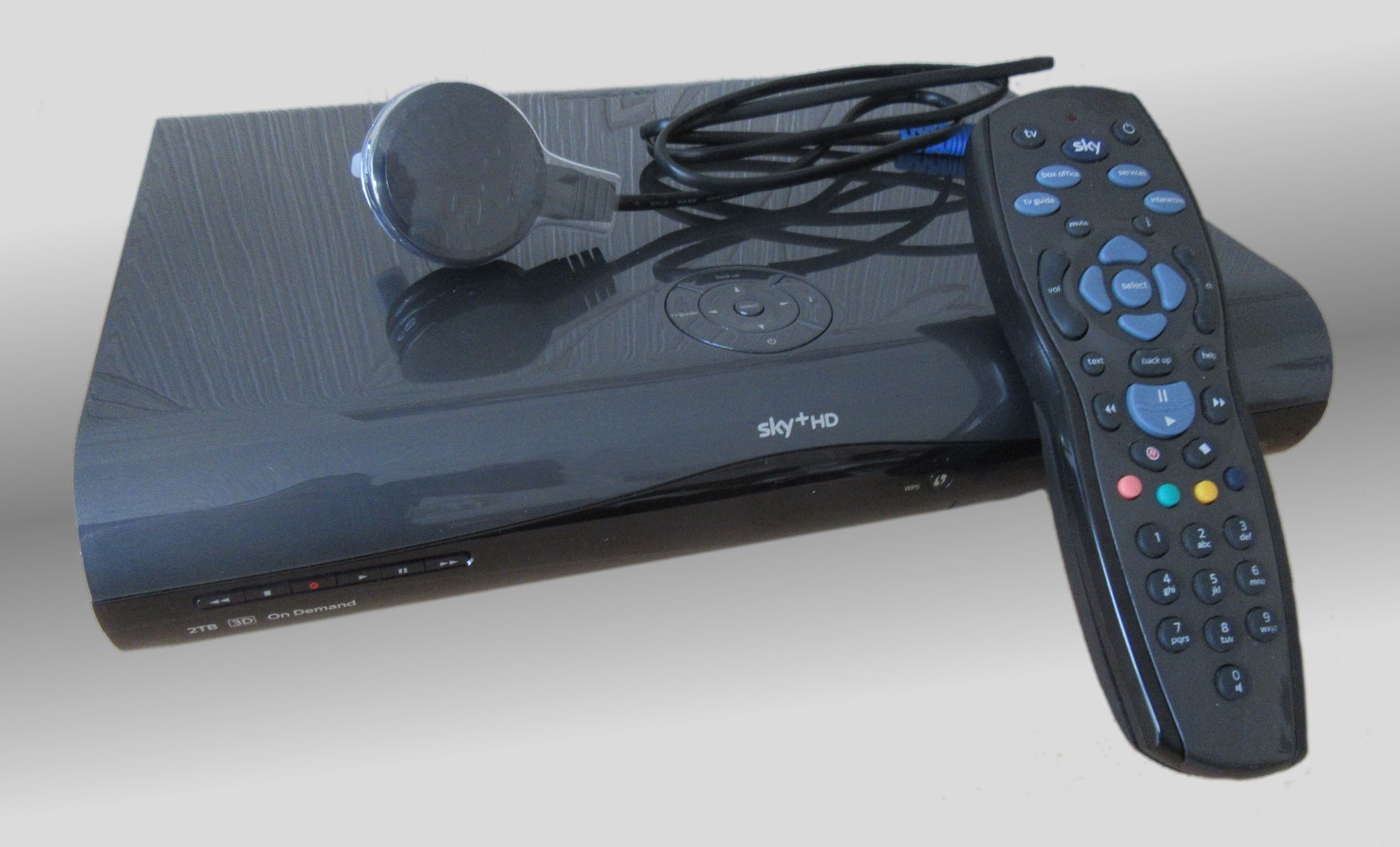
Sky+ HD DRX895W Set Top Box, with remote and power cable

On 1 October 2010, Sky began the process of downloading open-source software to Sky+ HD receivers. Unlike the majority of software upgrades made by Sky, the open source licences require Sky to notify customers that the download has taken place. Subscribers are notified with an on-screen message that refers them to a dedicated section of the Sky website. The website also includes a download of the open source components including the building environment. Sky says that it has found a number of Open Source Software developments that provide capabilities that benefit the software used in the Sky+ HD box.

=== Release history ===
Below is a list of boxes that have been manufactured for use with Sky+ HD. All boxes are now discontinued and no newer models are expected, since the launch of Sky Q.

| Model | PVR | Brand | Version | Dimensions (WxHxD) | Launched | Hard drive storage | | Latest firmware | Notes |
| Model | PVR | Brand | Version | Dimensions (WxHxD) | Launched | Supplied | Available | Latest firmware | Notes |
|---|---|---|---|---|---|---|---|---|---|
| DRX895WL | PVR6 | Sky | 4F31xx | 351x73x265 | Sep 2013 | 2TB | 1.5TB | R024.092.11.00P | Built in Wi-Fi Lite Box (Telephone, eSata & Composite Ports removed) |
| DRX890WL | PVR5 | Sky | 4F31xx | 364x73x255 | Sep 2013 | 500GB | 250GB | R024.092.11.00P | Built in Wi-Fi Lite Box (Telephone, eSata & Composite Ports removed) |
| DRX895W | PVR6 | Sky | 4F31xx | 351x73x265 | Mar 2012 | 2TB | 1.5TB | R024.092.11.00P | Replaced with DRX895WL (Built in Wi-Fi Lite Box) |
| DRX890W | PVR5 | Sky | 4F31xx | 364x73x255 | Mar 2012 | 500GB | 250GB | R024.092.11.00P | Replaced with DRX890WL (Built in Wi-Fi Lite Box) |
| DRX895 | PVR6 | Sky | 4F31xx | 351x73x265 | Oct 2011 | 2TB | 1.5TB | R024.092.11.00P | Replaced with DRX895W (Built in Wi-Fi) |
| DRX895 | PVR6 | Sky | 4F31xx | 351x73x265 | Jan 2010 | 1.5TB | 1TB | R024.092.11.00P | Replaced with 2TB model |
| DRX890 | PVR5 | Amstrad/Sky | 4F31xx | 364x73x255 | Mar 2009 | 500GB | 250GB | R024.092.11.00P | Replaced with DRX890W (Built in Wi-Fi) |
| DRX780 | PVR4 | Amstrad | 4F30xx | 399x81x295 | Nov 2008 | 300GB | 160GB | R010.070.91.17P | DR Stream No Longer Active |
| HDSKY500 | PVR4 | Samsung | 9730xx | 398x81x283 | Aug 2008 | 500GB | 250GB | R010.070.94.13P | DR Stream No Longer Active |
| HDSKY | PVR4 | Samsung | 9370xx | 398x81x283 | Aug 2008 | 300GB | 160GB | R010.070.94.13P | DR Stream No Longer Active |
| TDS850NB | PVR4 | Pace | 9F30xx | 398x80x285 | Oct 2007 | 300GB | 160GB | R010.070.94.13P | DR Stream No Longer Active |
| DSI8215 | PVR4 | Thomson | 4E30xx | 398x81x283 | May 2006 | 300GB | 160GB | Sky+ 8.3.2 | Phased out Summer 2013 |
Unsupported Supported Latest version

Sky also manufactured a standard Sky HD box without a hard drive, aimed primarily at customers subscribing to Sky Multiroom, as a cheaper alternative to receive HD channels if record and playback were not required.

| Model | Brand | Version | Dimensions (WxHxD) | Launched | Latest firmware | Notes |
|---|---|---|---|---|---|---|
| DRX595L | Sky | 4F7xxx | 273x52x204 | Sep 2013 | R011.075.59.17P | SKYHD STB for Multiroom & Freesat from Sky, (Telephone Port removed) (PVR inside) |
| DRX595 | Sky | 4F700x | 273x52x204 | Mar 2012 | R011.075.59.17P | Replaced with DRX595L (Lite Sky Box) |
Unsupported Supported Latest version

== Developments ==
=== Increase in HD channels ===
In over three years since launch, the number of HD channels available increased significantly, thus Sky+ HD was the world's largest HD offering outside North America.

Sky brought an update to its Sky+ app, this features a similar looking design to the Sky+HD box bringing the services more in line with one another.

On 30 July 2009, Sky confirmed the launch of a "pull" video-on-demand (VOD) service for 2010, adding to the current Sky Anytime "push" VOD service. The service, delivered by broadband internet, would utilise the Ethernet port of existing Sky+ HD boxes. Sky's Anytime+ will only be available to Sky broadband at launch but sky say it will be on all service providers in the near future. Although the service may be similar to DirecTV's VOD offering that also uses an operating system built by NDS Group. NDS Group was formally a Permira/News Corporation company, but currently part of Cisco. Sky have started the phased roll-out of the new guide software for this service.

On 29 April 2010, BSkyB revealed that their new video-on-demand service would be named Sky Anytime+. "It will be a broad offering at launch with a large range of content across the range of content that we show," CEO Jeremy Darroch said. "[It will feature] progressive download using the broadband return pathway and the hard disc in a combined way. All of the boxes are VOD-ready, so we'll be able to roll it out to all of the box population." Sky Anytime+ began a staggered roll out from 26 October 2010. In March 2011 it was confirmed by Sky that the Thomson Sky HD boxes would not be suitable for the new Anytime+ service. Customers with Thomson boxes were being offered New boxes.

On 1 February 2011, BSkyB introduced a new EPG for Sky HD subscribers which switched the standard definition channels with the high definition simulcast. For example, Sky News HD, which was on channel 517, switched to channel 501. The same happened for other non-regional HD channels, including Syfy, Comedy Central, Sky Sports, E4 and Sky1.

=== 3D ===
Following demonstrations in December 2008, Sky announced on 30 July 2009 its intention to launch a 3D channel during 2010, featuring a broad selection of 3D programming, which is expected to include movies, entertainment and sport. Existing Sky+ HD receivers will automatically be compatible with the new 3D service, although customers will require a new 3D compatible HDTV set to view in 3D. A 3D trailer has been in circulation in UK cinemas for the new service. It is thought that it will use the new MVC video codec. The first programme that was broadcast by Sky in 3D was the Arsenal vs Manchester United football match on Sunday 31 January 2010. The 3D match was available in nine hand-picked pubs in England and in Ireland. On Monday 29 March 2010, Sky 3D appeared on the EPG at number 217, showing "Programs Start on Saturday". Sky launched its 3D services on 3 April with the Manchester United vs Chelsea football match being broadcast in over a thousand pubs across England in 3D. As of October 2014 Sky 3D is on channel 170. The Sky 3D channel closed on 9 June 2015; 3D content remains available via on-demand channels. To this end, there will be a new 3D segment in the Sky Box Sets, Movies, Store and TV Guide sections.

== See also ==
- Sky
- Sky UK
- Sky Ireland
- High-definition television
- High-definition television in the United Kingdom
