= Sky UK =

British broadcaster and telecommunications company

Sky UK Limited
- Logo used since 2025
- Formerly: British Sky Broadcasting Ltd (BSkyB)
- Type: Subsidiary
- Industry: Pay television Mass media
- Founded: 2 November 1990; 36 years ago (as British Sky Broadcasting)
- Headquarters: London, England
- Area served: British Isles
- Key people: Dana Strong (CEO)
- Services: Broadband; Video on demand Broadcasting; Satellite; IPTV; Internet; Television production Mobile
- Parent: Sky Group
- Subsidiaries: Sky Ireland; The Cloud; Sky Broadband; Sky Home Communications; Now; Sky Subscriber Services; Sky In-Home Services
- Website: sky.com

Sky UK Limited (formerly British Sky Broadcasting Limited (BSkyB)), trading as Sky, is a British broadcaster and telecommunications company operating as a subsidiary of Sky Group (currently owned by Comcast). It provides television, broadband internet, fixed line and mobile telephone services to consumers and businesses in the United Kingdom. It is headquartered at the Sky Studios in Isleworth.

Sky is a major media company and the largest British broadcaster by revenue. It operates the Sky News news media organisation, Sky Sports, which is the largest sports TV broadcaster in the UK, and the Sky Studios film and TV production company. Sky is also the country's leading provider of pay-TV services (12.7 million customers as of the end of 2019) through its satellite TV platform Sky Q as well as the IPTV-based Sky Glass and Sky Stream products. Its flagship channels include Sky One, Sky Witness, Sky Documentaries, Sky Atlantic, Sky Sports and Sky Cinema. Sky is also one of the "big four" internet service providers.

Formed in 1990 through the merger of Sky Television and British Satellite Broadcasting, BSkyB grew into a major media company by the end of the decade, notably owning all the television broadcasting rights for the Premier League and almost all the domestic rights of Hollywood films. Following BSkyB's acquisition of Sky Italia and a majority interest in Sky Deutschland in 2014, its holding company British Sky Broadcasting Group plc changed its name to Sky plc (now Sky Group Limited). The UK subsidiary's name was changed from British Sky Broadcasting Limited to Sky UK Limited and continued to trade as "Sky".

== History ==
=== Origins ===
The Sky Television Network, an analogue direct-to-home satellite TV service using Luxembourg-based Astra satellites, launched in the UK on 5 February 1989 by Rupert Murdoch's Sky Television. It consisted of four channels broadcast free-to-air: Sky Channel/Sky One, Sky Movies, Sky News and Eurosport.

The present premium pay-TV service can trace its heritage back to 1990, when Sky Television and British Satellite Broadcasting (BSB) encrypted their respective film channels – Sky Movies and The Movie Channel which required viewers to get decoding equipment and a subscription to watch the channels. After the two companies merged to create British Sky Broadcasting (BSkyB) in November 1990, subscribers could get access to both channels, and two years later, the sports channel Sky Sports also became encrypted.

=== Premier League football ===
In the autumn of 1991, talks were held for the broadcast rights for Premier League for five years, from the 1992 season. ITV were the current rights holders and fought hard to retain the new rights. ITV had increased its offer from £18m to £34m per year to keep control of the rights. BSkyB joined forces with the BBC to make a counter bid. The BBC was given the highlights of most of the matches, while BSkyB paying £304m for the Premier League rights, would give them a monopoly of all live matches, up to 60 per year from the 1992 season. Murdoch described sport as a "battering ram" for pay television, which provided a strong customer base. A few weeks after the deal, ITV went to the High Court to get an injunction as it believed their bid details had been leaked before the decision was taken. ITV also asked the Office of Fair Trading to investigate since it believed Rupert Murdoch's media empire via its newspapers had influenced the deal. A few days later neither action took effect, ITV believed BSkyB was telephoned and informed of its £262m bid, and Premier League advised BSkyB to increase its counter bid.

BSkyB retained the rights paying £670m 1997–2001 deal, but was challenged by ONdigital for the rights from 2001 to 2004, thus were forced to £1.1 billion which gave them 66 live games a year.

Following a lengthy legal battle with the European Commission, which deemed the exclusivity of the rights to be against the interests of competition and the consumer, BSkyB's monopoly came to an end from the 2007–08 season. In May 2006, the Irish broadcaster Setanta Sports was awarded two of the six Premier League packages that the English FA offered to broadcasters. Sky picked up the remaining four for £1.3bn. In February 2015, Sky bid £4.2bn for a package of 120 premier league games across the three seasons from 2016. This represented an increase of 70% on the previous contract and was said to be £1bn more than the company had expected to pay. The move has been followed by staff cuts, increased subscription prices (including 9% in Sky's family package) and the dropping of the 3D channel.

=== Sky Multichannels ===
In September 1993, BSkyB launched Sky Multichannels which was the present digital platform's analogue predecessor. Sky Multichannels was a subscription package that gave access not only to Sky's channels but also to those of third-party broadcasters.

The service started on 1 September 1993. It was based on an idea by then CEO Sam Chisholm and chairman Rupert Murdoch of converting the company's business strategy to an entirely fee-based concept. The new package included four channels that were formerly available free-to-air, broadcasting on Astra's satellites, as well as introducing new channels. The service continued until the closure of BSkyB's analogue service on 27 September 2001, due to the expansion of the Sky Digital platform after its launch three years before. Some of the channels did broadcast either in the clear or soft-encrypted (whereby a Videocrypt decoder was required to decode, without a subscription card) before their addition to the Sky Multichannels package. Within two months of the launch, BSkyB gained 400,000 new subscribers, with the majority taking at least one premium channel as well, which helped BSkyB reach 3.5 million households by mid-1994. Michael Grade criticised the operations in front of the Select Committee on National Heritage, mainly for the lack of original programming on many of the new channels.

=== Launch of Sky Digital ===
BSkyB's digital service was officially launched on 1 October 1998 under the name Sky Digital, although small-scale tests were carried out before then. At this time the use of the Sky Digital brand made an important distinction between the new service and Sky's analogue services. Key selling points were the improvement in picture and sound quality, increased number of channels and an interactive service branded Open...., later called Sky Active. BSkyB competed with the ONdigital (later ITV Digital) terrestrial offering and cable services. Within 30 days, over 100,000 digiboxes had been sold, which helped bolster BSkyB's decision to give away free digiboxes and mini dishes from May 1999.

In addition to most channels from the Sky Multichannels package, many of which broadcast additional hours on Sky Digital, Sky Digital launched several new channels that were exclusive to the digital offer.

The switchover from analogue to digital proceeded relatively quickly. In 1998, there were 6 million 'multichannel' TV homes in the UK (i.e. homes that watch television other than the traditional analogue terrestrial), and over half of these homes watched television using BSkyB's analogue service. BSkyB's digital service surpassed the analogue service in terms of subscribers in late 1999.

By June 2000 the service had 3.6 million subscribers, which gave BSkyB 8.988 million subscribers across all platforms. This substantial growth reflected BSkyB's 34% share of viewers in multi-channel homes (up from 13.4% in 1999).

BSkyB's analogue service ended in October 2001, and the digital service would eventually be marketed as just 'Sky'. For some time, BSkyB also ran a free service named Freesat from Sky.

By June 2005, the number of digital subscribers increased to 7.8 million, while it produced 38,375 hours of sport in 2005. Sky's direct-to-home satellite service became available in 10 million homes in 2010; Europe's first pay-TV platform to achieve this milestone. Confirming it had reached its target, the broadcaster said its reach into 36% of households in the UK represented an audience of more than 25 million people. The target was first announced in August 2004, and since then an additional 2.4 million customers had subscribed to Sky's direct-to-home service. Media commentators had debated whether the figure could be reached as the growth in subscriber numbers elsewhere in Europe flattened.

=== Presence in DTT ===
The digital terrestrial television (DTT) service ONdigital/ITV Digital failed for numerous reasons, including, but not limited to numerous administrative and technical failures, nervous investors after a large downturn in the advertising market, the dot com crash, and Sky's aggressive marketing and domination of premium sporting rights. While Sky had been excluded from being a part of the ONdigital consortium, thereby making them a competitor by default, Sky was able to join ITV Digital's free-to-air replacement, Freeview, in which it holds an equal stake with the BBC, ITV, Channel 4 and Arqiva. Prior to October 2005, three Sky channels were available on this platform: Sky News, Sky Three, and Sky Sports News. Initially, Sky provided Sky Travel to the service. However, this was replaced by Sky Three on 31 October 2005, which was itself later re-branded as 'Pick TV' in 2011.

On 8 February 2007, Sky announced its intention to replace its three free-to-air digital terrestrial channels with four subscription channels. It was proposed that these channels would offer a range of content from the Sky portfolio including sports (including English Premier League Football), films, entertainment and news. The announcement came a day after Setanta Sports confirmed that it would launch in March as a subscription service on the digital terrestrial platform, and on the same day that NTL's services re-branded as Virgin Media. However, industry sources believed Sky would be forced to shelve plans to withdraw its channels from Freeview and replace them with subscription channels, due to possible lost advertising revenue.

==== Proposed platform ====
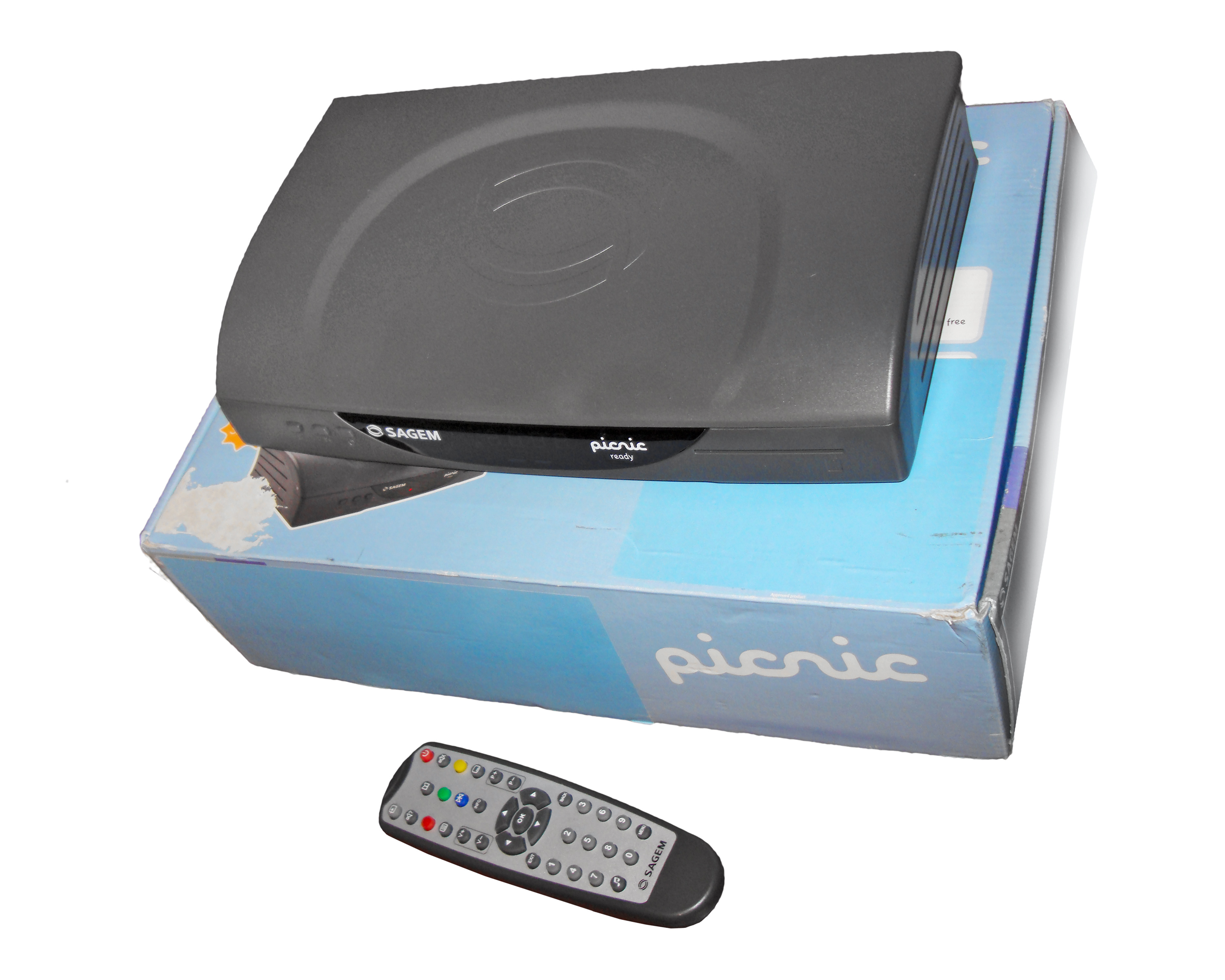
A Sagem DVB-T receiver marked as "Picnic ready", indicating compatibility with the planned service

Sky Picnic was a proposed pay television service which would have sat alongside Freeview and Top Up TV on the digital terrestrial television (DTT) platform in the United Kingdom. The proposal detailed replacing Sky's three free-to-air channels (Sky News, Sky Sports News and Sky Three) with five pay TV channels: Sky Sports 1, Sky Movies SD1 plus Sky One during the evening with one hour of Sky News content. There would also be two further daytime channels: a factual channel and a children's channel. It was first proposed in 2007 but was subject to a public consultation by Ofcom. Whilst the service was cleared to launch in 2010 it never officially launched, Sky having put it on hold in 2008.

=== Expansion into broadband and others ===
In November 2005, in partnership with Vodafone, Sky Mobile TV was launched which was the UK's first commercially available mobile TV service. Vodafone live! customers with 3G-enabled handsets would receive the service.

Sky initially faced increased competition from telecommunications providers to deliver pay television services over existing telephone lines using ADSL. Such providers were able to offer "triple play" or "quadruple play" packages combining landline telephone, broadband Internet, mobile telephone and pay television services. To compete with these providers, in October 2005, Sky bought the broadband Internet service provider Easynet for £211 million. This acquisition allowed Sky to offer a Sky-branded broadband service (see On Demand) as well as a "triple play" package combining satellite television, land-line telephone and Broadband service.

By 2010, Sky had increasingly invested in making original content. That year it purchased Virgin Media Television with its production arm and in a deal with HBO led to the launch of the Sky Atlantic channel in 2011. Sky Vision production company launched in 2012.

In 2011, BSkyB acquired The Cloud which provided public Wi-Fi access points. In 2012, BSkyB launched Now TV, an over-the-top, no-contract television service separate from and to complement its existing pay-TV platform. By 2017, Sky had also launched a mobile virtual network operator, Sky Mobile.

To modernise its digital satellite service, Sky designed and launched its new service and receiver called Sky Q in 2016. On 1 March 2018, it was reported that Sky UK had concluded successful negotiations with Netflix to offer Sky subscribers access to its international streaming service.

On 17 September 2020, Sky Arts became the first premium Sky channel available on the free-to-air terrestrial Freeview service, joining Sky News among several other channels.

=== Television changes and IPTV launch ===
On 28 July 2021, Sky announced that its flagship channel Sky One would shut down on 1 September, to be replaced by two channels; Sky Showcase, showing a mixture of content from other Sky Channels, and Sky Max, showing Sky's original programming and entertainment previously shown on Sky One.

On 7 October 2021, Sky announced a new all-in-one TV set called Sky Glass. It was designed to support streaming of Sky TV and streaming service shows over WiFi, eliminating the need for a satellite dish or box. It launched on 18 October 2021, with three sizes available: 43-inch, 55-inch and 65-inch.

In March 2025, the company announced plans to close customer call centres in Stockport, Sheffield and Leeds, which would result in around 2,000 job losses and a 7 per cent reduction in its workforce.

On 26 February 2026, Sky shut down pay television channels Sky Showcase and Sky Max to relaunch the flagship channel Sky One. The group also changed all Sky TV channel logos to match Sky One's new Square layout.

In 2026, the parent company of Sky UK, Sky Group, confirmed that they are in the process of purchasing ITV's TV and streaming channels which, if approved, will result in ITV channels under operational management of Sky UK. Under the proposed deal, ITV will have to remain free-to-air until 2034 and ITV Studios will become a separate company in a supply deal and ITV shows will remain on ITV's channels.

== Television broadcasting platform ==
As of 2026, Sky run pay TV subscription services based on satellite (since 1998, originally launched as Sky Digital) and Internet Protocol (since 2021) infrastructure and delivery methods.

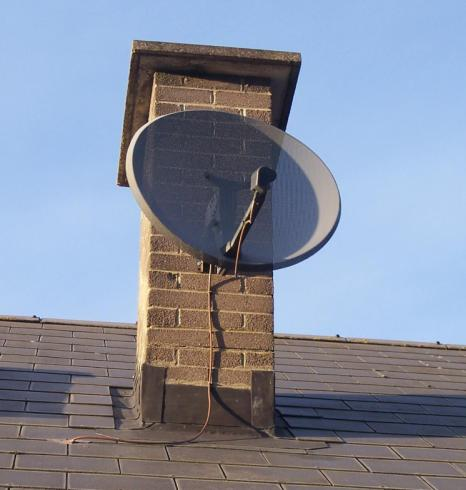
Sky Minidish

=== Transmission ===
When Sky Digital was launched in 1998 the new service used the Astra 2A satellite which was located at the 28.2°E orbital position, unlike the analogue service which was broadcast from 19.2°E. This was subsequently followed by more Astra satellites as well as Eutelsat's Eurobird 1 (now Eutelsat 33C) at 28.5°E), enabled the company to launch a new all-digital service, Sky, with the potential to carry hundreds of television and radio channels. The old position was shared with broadcasters from several European countries, while the new position at 28.5°E came to be used almost exclusively for channels that broadcast to the United Kingdom.

New Astra satellites joined the position in 2000 and 2001, and the number of channels available to customers increased accordingly. This trend continued with the launch of Eurobird 1 (now Eutelsat 33C) in 2001. Additionally, some channels occasionally received new numbering – However, in early 2006, the majority of channels received new numbering, with some receiving single-digit changes, whilst others received new numbers entirely.

It was the UK's most popular digital TV service until it was overtaken by Freeview in April 2007.

Prior to the migration to Astra 2E, 2F and 2G, Sky was transmitted from the Astra satellites located at 28.2° east (2A/2C/2E/2F) and Eutelsat's Eutelsat 33C satellite at 28.5°E.

As of 2019, Astra 2E, 2F and 2G are the sole satellites used by Sky UK; a number of services are served via narrow UK-only spot beams, the other services downlinked with a Europe-wide footprint. UK-only spot beams are intentionally tightly focused over mainland UK, however they are still receivable dependent on location and access to a sufficiently large dish and sensitive LNB.

Eutelsat 33C was subsequently moved to 33° East, then moved again to 133° West and renamed as 'Eutelsat 133 West A' to serve transponders offering European and African language services.

=== Low-noise block converter ===
Provided is a universal Ku band LNB (9.75/10.600 GHz) which is fitted at the end of the dish and pointed at the correct satellite constellation; most digital receivers will receive the free to air channels. Some broadcasts are free-to-air and unencrypted, some are encrypted but do not require a monthly subscription (known as free-to-view), some are encrypted and require a monthly subscription, and some are pay-per-view services. To view the encrypted content a VideoGuard UK-equipped receiver (all of which are dedicated to the Sky service, and cannot be used to decrypt other services) needs to be used. Unofficial CAMs are now available to view the service, although the use of them breaks the user's contract with Sky and invalidates the user's rights to use the card.

=== Standard definition broadcasts ===
Sky's standard definition broadcasts are in DVB-compliant MPEG-2, with the Sky Cinema and Sky Box Office channels including optional Dolby Digital soundtracks for recent films, although these are only accessible with a Sky+ box. Sky+ HD material is broadcast using MPEG-4 and most of the HD material uses the DVB-S2 standard. Interactive services and 7-day EPG use the proprietary OpenTV system, with set-top boxes including modems for a return path. Sky News, amongst other channels, provides a pseudo-video on demand interactive service by broadcasting looping video streams.

=== Digital satellite receivers ===
Sky utilises the VideoGuard pay-TV scrambling system owned by NDS, a Cisco Systems company. There are tight controls over the use of VideoGuard decoders; they are not available as stand-alone DVB CAMs (conditional-access modules). Sky has design authority over all digital satellite receivers capable of receiving their service. The receivers, though designed and built by different manufacturers, must conform to the same user interface look and feel as all the others. This extends to the Personal video recorder (PVR) offering (branded Sky+).

==== Sky Digibox ====
Sky launched with a set-top box known as the Sky Digibox, using the Slogans "What do you want to watch?", "Entertainment your way" and the current slogan "Believe in Better". This was followed by Sky+, a digital video recorder with an internal hard drive which allows viewers to 'pause live television' (by switching from a live feed to a paused real-time recording that can be restarted at any point) and schedule programmes to record in the future.

In later years the Sky+ box and then the Sky+ HD box replaced the original Digibox. The first photos of a prototype Sky HD box began appearing in magazines in August 2005. Sky launched HDTV services in May 2006. All Sky+ HD boxes incorporated a version of Sky+ using a 300GB, 500GB, or 1TB hard drive (of which 160GB, 250GB or 500GB are available to the user) to accommodate the necessary extra data.

==== Sky+ ====
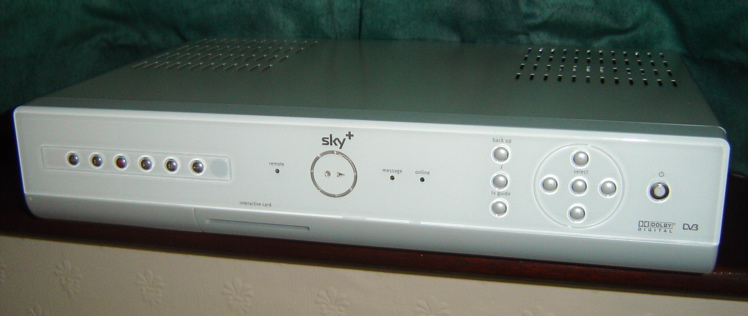
A Sky+ box

Launched in 2001, Sky+ was the Britain's first personal video recorder (PVR) service along with its dedicated Sky+ Digibox with a hard disk. Sky initially charged an additional subscription fee for using a Sky+ PVR with their service; waiving the charge for subscribers whose package included two or more premium channels. This changed as of 1 July 2007, and now customers that subscribe to any Sky package have Sky+ included at no extra charge. Customers that do not subscribe to Sky's channels can still pay a monthly fee to enable Sky+ functions. In September 2007, Sky launched a new TV advertising campaign targeting Sky+ at women. As of 31 March 2008, Sky had 3,393,000 Sky+ users.

In January 2010 Sky discontinued the Sky+ Box, limited the standard Sky Box to Multiroom upgrade only and started to issue the Sky+ HD Box as standard, thus giving all new subscribers the functions of Sky+. In February 2011 Sky discontinued the non-HD variant of its Multiroom box, offering a smaller version of the SkyHD box without Sky+ functionality.

==== Sky+ HD ====
Sky launched its HDTV service, Sky+ HD, on 22 May 2006. Prior to its launch, Sky claimed that 40,000 people had registered to receive the HD service. In the week before the launch, rumours started to surface that Sky was having supply issues with its set-top box (STB) from the manufacturer Thomson. On Thursday 18 May 2006, and continuing through the weekend before launch, people were reporting that Sky had either cancelled or rescheduled its installation. Finally, the BBC reported that 17,000 customers had yet to receive the service due to failed deliveries. On 31 March 2012, Sky announced the total number of homes with Sky+ HD was 4,222,000.

In early 2012, Sky released an update to its Sky Anytime service. This update offers customers the chance to buy and rent films from the Sky Store. In June 2012, Sky launched a new EPG for Sky+ HD boxes. The update included a new modernised look and improved functionality. As of 1 October 2012, Sky Anytime was rebranded as Sky On Demand which included ITV Player and Demand 5. BBC iPlayer followed in late autumn with 4oD which changed to All 4 on 30 March 2015, and launched in early 2013.

==== Sky Q ====
On 18 November 2015, Sky announced Sky Q, a range of products and services to be available in 2016. The Sky Q range consists of three set-top boxes (Sky Q 1TB, Sky Q 2TB and Sky Q Mini), a broadband router (Sky Q Hub) and mobile applications.

The Sky Q set-top boxes introduce a new user interface, Wi-Fi hotspot functionality, Power-line and Bluetooth connectivity and a new touch-sensitive remote control. The Sky Q Mini set-top boxes connect to the Sky Q set-top boxes with a Wi-Fi or Power-line connection rather than receive their own satellite feeds. This allows all set-top boxes in a household to share recordings and other media. Sky Q Mini boxes are not capable of UHD playback due to hardware limitations.

Sky Q became available to order on 9 February 2016.

Unlike Sky, Sky+, and Sky+ HD boxes, Sky Q boxes remain the property of Sky and must be returned when the contract ends. Charges of up to £140 per item apply for unreturned items – Sky claims this charge does not buy the equipment, which must still be given back.

===== 4K UHD =====
The Sky Q 2TB set-top box is capable of receiving and displaying 4K UHD broadcasts. HDR was added on 27 May 2020, alongside the launch of Sky Nature and Sky Documentary channels. The HLG format is to be included in a select number of UHD VoD downloads, starting with Sky Nature before being added to other channel content. UHD broadcasts started on 13 August 2016, with the first live Premier League football match of the 2016/17 season, Hull vs Leicester City. UHD broadcasts are available free of charge to Sky Q 2TB multiscreen customers with any other relevant subscriptions.

=== Sky Go ===
Sky Go is provided free of charge for Sky (satellite TV) subscribers and allows them to watch channels live and on-demand through an internet connection on a computer or mobile device.

On 29 May 2009, it was confirmed that Sky Go would be made available on the Xbox 360. In November 2011 Sony Computer Entertainment struck a deal with Sky to bring some of its shows to the PlayStation Store Video Store. On 3 December 2014, Sky Go became available on the PlayStation 4 under the name "TV from Sky", followed by the PlayStation 3 on 29 January 2015.

=== On demand ===
Sky has offered a video on demand (VOD) service to Sky TV customers since 2005. On 26 September 2012, Sky relaunched its "Anytime+" on-demand-via-broadband service as "On Demand", as the BBC's iPlayer joined the line-up of channels offering catch-up TV on the company's Sky+ HD box. The BBC would make the previous week's programmes available alongside ITV, Channel 4's All 4, Channel 5 and the partly BBC Worldwide-owned UKTV, as well as Sky's own channels.

=== 3D broadcasts ===
Sky began to broadcast programmes in 3D in April 2010. This included new 3D channels, including a Sky Sports 3D and Sky Movies 3D. Sky previously experimented with 3D broadcasting by broadcasting an Arsenal vs Manchester United football game live in 3D in nine pubs situated throughout the United Kingdom.

=== IPTV services ===
In the 2020s, Sky have transitioned away from satellite TV in favour of Internet Protocol delivered TV with the Sky Stream service and the Sky Glass hardware. They both run an operating system referred to as Sky OS. It previously was known as 'Entertainment OS' before it was renamed. It has brought in features not seen in Sky Q's operating system such as profiles and playlists. Although different, the user interface design on Stream and Glass is very similar.

==== Sky Glass ====
On 11 October 2021, Sky announced an in-house smart TV range known as Sky Glass. Features include a 4K quantum dot display, integrated Dolby Atmos surround sound speakers and voice controls. Also announced was a 4K camera with motion controls, gesture support and a TV sharing feature developed in partnership with Microsoft. The TV set is designed to stream video over an internet connection; a satellite dish is therefore not required. It also includes a backup Freeview tuner in case a broadband connection is not available. Sky Glass was released on 18 October 2021 in the UK, and 25 August 2022 in Ireland.

==== Sky Stream ====
Sky released a streaming box called Sky Stream on 18 October 2022. The service is compatible with any broadband service; however, the box is registered with a specific home.

=== Electronic programme guide ===
==== Technology ====
Sky maintains an electronic programme guide (EPG) which provides information about upcoming programmes and a list of channels. TV channels available on Sky are assigned a three-digit logical channel number which can be entered on the remote control to access the channel and determines in what order the channels are listed. Since 2005, radio channels similarly receive a four-digit EPG number (usually 0 prefix + three digits, although they can sometimes have a 3 prefix instead of a 0 on some older Sky Digiboxes & Sky+ boxes).

The EPG differs depending on the viewer's location due to the limited regional availability of certain channels or conditions relating to their must-carry status. For example, this ensures that viewers get access to the correct BBC or ITV region or that S4C gets a prominent listing in Wales.

All channels are grouped into categories depending on their content. What section of the EPG a channel gets allocated is determined by rules set up by Sky.

In 2000, Sky introduced an audio channel line-up service for its blind or partially-sighted customers on channel 996, which features a continuous recording of a voice reading out the names and numbers of all the channels that are currently available. The service started with a female voice, who has since been replaced by several male voices in later years (including today's male voice) - as by far she was the only female voice to be used on the service.

Sky has no veto over the presence of channels on their EPG, with open access being enforced as part of their operating licence from Ofcom. Any channel which can get carriage on a suitable beam of a satellite at 28° East is entitled to access to Sky's EPG for a fee, ranging from £15–100,000. Third-party channels which opt for encryption receive discounts ranging from reduced price to free EPG entries, free carriage on a Sky leased transponder or actual payment for being carried. However, even in this case, Sky does not carry any control over the channel's content or carriage issues such as picture quality.

In October 2007, Sky announced that they would not accept new applications to launch the channel on their EPG, citing "very significant memory constraints" on many of its older digiboxes.

In June 2012, Sky launched a new EPG dubbed "Darwin" for their Sky+HD receivers, offering a more modern, refreshed interface and some improved functionality. Newer SkyQ UHD receivers utilise different hardware, so run a different software stack.

==== Numbering system ====
The EPG numbering is altered frequently when new channels launch or receive new numbers. A few times, the EPG has been substantially altered. For example:

- In early 2006, most channels received new numbering. This shake-up was intended to split up the original ten categories into sixteen. For example, several channels that had been listed under the 'Entertainment' category were split off into a new 'Lifestyle & Culture' category while the 'News & Documentaries' category was split into two. The 'Specialist' category, which had included shopping, dating, gambling, and international and adult channels was split into several genres.
- Following the integration of Living TV Group into Sky in early 2011, several prominent slots were freed up as many channels were closed down. It was, reported Broadband TV News, the biggest reshuffle in EPG positions for over a decade, with MTV, Comedy Central, Universal Channel, Syfy, News Corporation's FX, and 40 HD channels moving to more prominent places.
- Documentaries and other channels moving towards general entertainment programming and many other channel categories are being overspilled into other parts of the EPG. Sky reshuffled the channels again on 1 May 2018 which merged the documentaries and entertainment channels making many documentaries move to more prominent slots which had been occupied by time shift and standard definition channels which had been given their own areas in the 200s and 800s with the 800s being also filled with SD channels from other categories.

=== Interactive services ===
==== Open.... and Sky Active ====
Open.... was an interactive service based on the digital satellite transmissions of Sky, created and operated under a joint venture between BSkyB, BT, Matsushita and HSBC. Launching a few months late in August 1999, Open.... was marketed as the flagship interactive TV service on the then newly launched Sky Digital platform and was immediately accessible by pressing the "Interactive" button on the Sky Digital remote control. It connected using to the telephone network with data operated by BT and peripherals like keyboards were available for use with these services. Services included shopping, email (provided by BT), gaming, banking and information services like film guides and weather, but it was a "walled garden" service without access to the open web. Open.... was awarded a Design Council Millennium Product Award.

Open.... only survived until May 2001 when it was fully acquired by BSkyB, losing £116 million. It was rebranded and relaunched as Sky Active in October and more integrated into the live TV experience using the red button. The previous e-commerce features of Open...., which proved unprofitable, were done away by Sky in favour of interactive gambling (integrating betting services during live sports broadcasts), which were collectively combined into Sky Winzone, and reality TV voting, giving extra streams of revenue. The infrastructure originally made by Open.... was also used for Sky Sports Active for broadcasting multi-screen football and racing coverage that could be controlled by the viewer.

Dating services and the ability to top-up mobile phone credit on a Sky Digibox were other features that were in operation at one point in time. The gaming section used the pay-to-play model and was known for many years as Sky Gamestar before turning into Sky Games in 2007. BSkyB even launched a Sky Gamepad infrared gaming controller for use with these games. Beehive Bedlam was considered to be one of the most popular games of the service and Sky brought it back in 2020 for the Sky Q.

Sky Active continued to be operated until January 2015 while Sky Sports Active shut in September 2024.

==== Teletext ====
For a long time, BSkyB operated a now-dormant teletext service called Sky Text.

=== Television channels ===
Sky, and its sister companies, operate a number of channels in the UK and Ireland with some being joint ventures with other companies:

==== Active ====
===== Entertainment =====
- Challenge
- Comedy Central (+1 available) (joint venture with Paramount Skydance)
- Comedy Central Extra (joint venture with Paramount Skydance)
- Sky One
- Sky Atlantic (+1 available)
- Sky Comedy
- Sky Witness (+1 available)
- Sky Sci-Fi
- Sky Mix

===== Factual =====
- Crime & Investigation (+1 available) (joint venture with Hearst Networks UK)
- Sky Arts
- Sky Crime (+1 available)
- Sky Documentaries
- Sky History (joint venture with Hearst Networks UK)
- MysteryX (joint venture with Hearst Networks UK)
- Sky Nature

===== Kids =====
- Sky Kids

===== Lifestyle =====
- Blaze (part-time +1 available) (joint venture with Hearst Networks UK)

===== News =====
- Sky News

===== Sports =====
- Sky Sports Action
- Sky Sports +
- Sky Sports Box Office
- Sky Sports Cricket
- Sky Sports Darts
- Sky Sports F1
- Sky Sports Football
- Sky Sports Golf
- Sky Sports Main Event
- Sky Sports Mix
- Sky Sports News
- Sky Sports NFL
- Sky Sports Premier League
- Sky Sports Racing (joint venture with Arena Racing Company)
- Sky Sports Tennis

===== Movies =====
- Disney+ Cinema
- Sky Cinema Action
- Sky Cinema Comedy
- Sky Cinema Drama
- Sky Cinema Family
- Sky Cinema Greats
- Sky Cinema Hits
- Sky Cinema Premiere
- Sky Cinema Sci-Fi Horror
- Sky Cinema Select
- Sky Cinema Thriller

==== Defunct ====
- .tv
- The Amp
- Bio (joint venture with A+E Networks UK)
- Bravo
- Bravo 2
- Challenge Jackpot
- Channel One
- The Comedy Channel
- E!
- Galaxy
- Lifetime (joint venture with A+E Networks UK)
- Merit
- The Movie Channel
- Now (Not to be confused with the Now streaming service)
- PremPlus
- The Power Station
- Real Lives
- Sky 3D
- Sky 3D Box Office
- Sky Arts 1
- Sky Arts 2
- Sky Atlantic VIP
- Sky Cinema Animation
- Sky Cinema Disney
- Sky Living
- Sky Living It
- Sky Living Loves
- Sky Max
- Sky Movies 007 HD
- Sky Movies Box Office
- Sky Movies Classics
- Sky Movies Indie
- Sky Movies Max
- Sky Movies Premier
- Sky Movies Superheroes
- Sky News Ireland
- Sky Real Lives
- Sky Replay
- Sky Scottish
- Sky Showcase
- Sky Soap
- Sky Sports Arena
- Sky Sports Extra
- Sky Sports Xtra
- Sky Travel
- The Sports Channel

== Content production and broadcasting ==
Sky Sports and Sky News are internal editorial and production departments of Sky UK that handle journalism and digital media production, as well as broadcast engineering for their respective channels on TV and online.

Production of creative and high-value content like dramas and Sky Originals are handled by the Sky Group subsidiary Sky Studios.

== Fixed-line broadband service ==
Sky offers broadband using the Openreach and CityFibre networks. Customer premises connect to the network using ADSL, FTTC and FTTP. It also includes a fixed-line telephone service. In addition, NOW Broadband is a brand name of low-cost broadband plans associated with the Now over-the-top television service brand operated by Sky. In the Republic of Ireland, Sky Ireland also runs a service with the same name.

The service officially launched on 18 July 2006. It came as a result after Sky agreed to purchase the ISP Easynet for £211 million in October 2005. At the time, Easynet were one of two companies in the UK that had made major investments in local-loop unbundling (LLU), providing Sky with access to 232 unbundled telephone exchanges. The purchased company was placed under a new Sky division, Sky Broadband.

In April 2012, Sky Fibre was launched almost two and a half years after British Telecom launched BT Infinity in January 2010. It provided Sky's first fibre to the cabinet (FTTC) offering instead of only the previous ADSL.

In June 2017 Sky launched a free nuisance call blocking service as an optional extra for their landline customers. As was common for Sky Broadband marketing campaigns during the 2010s, the launch was promoted with an advert featuring a tie in with a film franchise, in this case, Despicable Me 3.

=== Customer base ===
In October 2007, Sky reached the one million mark in terms of customer numbers, and claim to be adding one new customer every 40 seconds. By September 2009, it had 2.3 million customers. By July 2012 Sky had reached four million customers, and unbundled exchanges covering over 70% of the United Kingdom. By January 2017, Sky said it had 6.1 million customers.

Sky agreed on 1 March 2013 to buy the fixed telephone line and broadband business of Telefónica UK, trading under the O2 and BE brands. The company agreed to pay £180 million initially, followed by a further £20 million after all customers have been transferred to Sky's existing Broadband and telephone business. and customers were transferred during 2014.

=== Combination with TV ===
In 2010, Sky created Anytime+ (later known as On Demand) that combines Sky Broadband and Sky+ HD to offer an on-demand service using the Ethernet socket of the Sky+ HD box and the Sky Broadband router. It allowed streaming content directly to a television. Unlike other VOD services, On Demand video counted towards a user's data usage.

== Mobile cellular communications ==
On 21 October 2016, it was announced that public pre-registration for Sky's new cellular mobile network, Sky Mobile, would take place from 31 October 2016. The network operates as an MVNO, utilising the O2 radio access network infrastructure, and O2's full network speeds and 4G+. On 5 January 2017 Sky Mobile went live to the public across the UK.

Sky Mobile also launched in the Republic of Ireland by Sky Ireland in September 2024, and plans have been announced for Sky Mobile to expand to Italy by Sky Italia.

== Non-subscription services ==
Sky has run numerous independent platform-agnostic services that are not tied to their subscription services.

=== Sky Box Office ===
Launched in 1996, Sky Box Office has been the company's group of pay-per-view services for sports content and others.

=== Sky Store ===
Sky Store is a digital storefront (transactional video-on-demand) from which a library of films from Sky Cinema can be rented or bought digitally. It is available to anyone with a compatible device and does not require a subscription to Sky TV or broadband services.

=== NOW ===
NOW is an over-the-top contract-free television service from Sky. The service is provided on a NOW device or through an app on selected computers, mobile devices, set-top boxes and smart TVs. NOW is separate from the core Sky TV service.

== Marketing ==
Sky (formerly marketed as Sky Digital) is the brand name for Sky Group's United Kingdom digital satellite television and telecommunications services. Slogans that have been used for marketing include "What do you want to watch?", "Entertainment your way" and the current slogan "Believe in Better". Sky has also aired several advertisements featuring characters from Toy Story for Toy Story of Terror! and Toy Story That Time Forgot, Minions, Inside Out, Kung Fu Panda 3, The Secret Life of Pets, The Lego Batman Movie, Despicable Me 3 and Monster Family.

== Controversies and disputes ==
Sky UK has been the subject of much controversy and criticism, including allegations of political corruption, tax avoidance, and anti-competitive practices. It has also been involved in numerous disputes and litigations.

=== Virgin Media (2007-2008) ===
Virgin Media (re-branded in 2007 from NTL:Telewest) started to offer a high-definition television (HDTV) capable set top box, although from 30 November 2006 until 30 July 2009 it only carried one linear HD channel, BBC HD, after the conclusion of the ITV HD trial. Virgin Media has claimed that other HD channels were "locked up" or otherwise withheld from their platform, although Virgin Media did in fact have an option to carry Channel 4 HD in the future. Nonetheless, the linear channels were not offered, Virgin Media instead concentrating on its Video on Demand service to carry a modest selection of HD content. Virgin Media has nevertheless made a number of statements over the years, suggesting that more linear HD channels are on the way.

In 2007, Sky and Virgin Media became involved in a dispute over the carriage of Sky channels on cable TV. The failure to renew the existing carriage agreements negotiated with NTL and Telewest resulted in Virgin Media removing the basic channels from the network on 1 March 2007. Virgin Media claimed that Sky had substantially increased the asking price for the channels, a claim which Sky denied, on the basis that their new deal offered "substantially more value" by including HD channels and Video On Demand content which was not previously carried by cable.

In response, Sky ran a number of TV, radio and print advertisements claiming that Virgin Media doubted the value of the channels concerned, at first urging Virgin Media customers to call their cable operator to show their support for Sky, and later urging Virgin Media customers to migrate to Sky to continue receiving the channels. The broadcasting regulator Ofcom subsequently found these adverts in breach of their code.

The availability (at an extra charge) of Sky's premium sports and movie services was not affected by the dispute, and Sky Sports 3 was offered as a replacement for Sky One on many Virgin Media packages. Setanta launched Setanta Sports News as a replacement for Sky Sports News and Virgin Media Television rebranded Ftn to Virgin 1 to replace Sky One. This impasse continued for twenty-one months, with both companies initiating High Court proceedings. Amongst Virgin Media's claims to the court (denied by Sky) were that Sky had unfairly reduced the amount which it paid to VMTV for the carriage of Virgin Media's own channels on satellite.

Eventually, on 4 November 2008 it was announced that an agreement had been struck for Sky's basic channels – including Sky One, Sky Two, Sky News, Sky Sports News, Sky Real Lives and Sky Real Lives 2 to return to Virgin Media from 13 November 2008 until 12 June 2011 alongside the addition of Sky Arts 1 and Sky Arts 2, on the XL Package and Sky Three on the M Package (as it was a Freeview Channel). In exchange, Sky would be provided continued carriage of Virgin Media Television's channels – Living, Livingit, Bravo, Bravo +1, Trouble, Challenge and Virgin1 for the same period.

The agreements include fixed annual carriage fees of £30m for the channels with both channel suppliers able to secure additional capped payments if their channels meet certain performance-related targets. Currently, there is no indication as to whether the new deal includes the additional Video On Demand and High Definition content which had previously been offered by Sky. As part of the agreements, both Sky and Virgin Media agreed to terminate all High Court proceedings against each other relating to the carriage of their respective basic channels.

=== ISP data protection (2010) ===
On 21 September 2010, the website of ACS:Law was subjected to a DDoS attack as part of Operation Payback. After the site came back online a 350 MB file was uploaded containing spreadsheets listing more than 8,000 Sky broadband customers accused of making unauthorized downloads of adult films. This raised issues concerning Sky not following Data Protection Act guidelines.

=== Anti-competitive comments (2011) ===
On 12 July 2011, former Prime Minister Gordon Brown claimed that Sky's largest shareholder – News Corporation – attempted to affect government policy with regards to the BBC in pursuit of its own commercial interests. He went further, in a speech in Parliament on 13 July 2011, stating:

"Mr James Murdoch, which included his cold assertion that profit, not standards were what mattered in the media, underpinned an ever more aggressive News International and Sky agenda under his and Mrs Brooks' leadership that was brutal in its simplicity. Their aim was to cut the BBC licence fee, to force BBC online to charge for its content, for the BBC to sell off its commercial activities, to open up more national sporting events to bids from Sky and move them away from the BBC, to open up the cable and satellite infrastructure market, and to reduce the power of their regulator, Ofcom. I rejected those policies."

On 13 July 2011, MP Chris Bryant stated to the House of Commons, in the Parliamentary Debate on the Rupert Murdoch and News Corporation Bid for Sky that the company was anti-competitive:

"The company has lots of technological innovation that only a robust entrepreneur could bring to British society, but it has also often been profoundly anti-competitive. I believe that the bundling of channels so as to increase profit and make it impossible for others to participate in the market is anti-competitive. I believe that the way in which the application programming interface—the operating system—has been used has been anti-competitive and that Sky has deliberately set about selling set-top boxes elsewhere, outside areas where they have proper rights. If one visits a flat in Spain where a British person lives, one finds that they mysteriously manage to have a Sky box there even though it is registered to a house in the United Kingdom."

=== Unnecessary item (2012) ===
In December 2012, the UK parliament heard a claim that a subscription to Sky was 'often damaging' to welfare recipients.

=== Microsoft (2013-2014) ===
In July 2013, the English High Court of Justice found that Microsoft's use of the term "SkyDrive" infringed on Sky's right to the "Sky" trademark. On 31 July 2013, Sky and Microsoft announced their settlement, in which Microsoft will not appeal the ruling, and will rename its SkyDrive cloud storage service after an unspecified "reasonable period of time to allow for an orderly transition to a new brand," plus "financial and other terms, the details of which are confidential". On 27 January 2014, Microsoft announced "that SkyDrive will soon become OneDrive" and "SkyDrive Pro" becomes "OneDrive for Business".

=== Hello Games (2013-2016) ===
Hello Games was in legal negotiations with Sky over the trademark on the word "Sky" used for the title of their video game No Man's Sky for three years. The issue was ultimately settled in June 2016, allowing Hello Games to continue to use the name.

=== Discovery Networks (2017) ===
On 25 January 2017, Discovery Networks announced that they were in a dispute with Sky UK over the costs of payment fees to the broadcaster. The broadcaster threatened to blackout their channels on the Sky platform, which includes Eurosport, Discovery Channel, TLC, Animal Planet, Investigation Discovery, DMAX, Discovery Turbo, Discovery Shed, Discovery Science, Discovery History and Home & Health, unless Sky accepted their request for fair pricing. The channel 'blackout' would have also affected the Sky-owned NOW TV with the removal of Discovery Channel from both the live stream and On Demand service. Sky indicated that they will not bow down, and the channels would likely become unavailable from 1 February 2017.

The same day, Discovery sent out a press release on the dispute and also blocked access to its own website with the news. Discovery stated enough is enough and claimed that Sky is paying less for its channels than it was ten years ago. At that time, Discovery had stated that its viewing share has grown by more than 20%. Managing Director Susanna Dinnage stated in the press release: "We believe Sky is using what we consider to be its dominant market position to further its own commercial interest over those of viewers and independent broadcasters. The vitality of independent broadcasters like Discovery and plurality in TV is under threat." In response, Sky stated that they had been "overpaying Discovery for years." It comes after Sky had paid £4.2 billion on Premier League rights for the following three seasons.

On 31 January 2017 at around 21:00, Sky UK revealed that they would continue to broadcast the Discovery Networks Channels by releasing the following statement: "Great news, we can confirm that Sky will continue to carry the Discovery and Eurosport channels. This means you can still watch channels including: Animal Planet, Discovery HD, Discovery History, Discovery Home & Health, Discovery Science, Discovery Shed, Discovery Turbo, DMAX, Eurosport1, Eurosport2, Investigation Discovery, TLC, and Quest." At the time of the statement release, it had not been revealed how much Sky UK had paid Discovery Networks.

== Awards and nominations ==
Year	Association	Category	Nominee(s)	Result
2017	Diversity in Media Awards	Broadcaster of the Year	Sky	Won

== See also ==
- Sky Group
- Sky Television (1984–1990)
- Sky Magazine
- Astra
