= List of libraries owned by Comcast =

This is a list of content libraries and catalogs owned by Comcast.

== Content libraries ==
=== Comcast Holdings Corporation ===
- Comcast Interactive Media
  - DailyCandy
- Xumo

=== NBCUniversal ===
==== Universal Entertainment ====
- Universal Pictures film library (excluding films owned by third-party companies or owned in the public domain)
  - Universal International Studios
    - Carnival Films
  - Universal 1440 Entertainment
  - DreamWorks Animation (including the 2006-2012 film library, which is excluded from the Paramount Pictures film library by Paramount Pictures, and the 2013-2017 film library, which is excluded from the 20th Century Fox/20th Century Studios film library by The Walt Disney Company)
    - DreamWorks Classics
      - UPA library (excluding theatrical films owned by third-party companies)
        - Several Godzilla films (under license from Toho)
      - Harvey Films library (excluding co-productions owned by third-party companies)
        - Famous Studios/Paramount Cartoon Studios library (post-October 1950 and pre-March 1962) (under license from Paramount Pictures)
      - Noddy
      - Olivia
      - Felix the Cat
      - Where's Waldo?
      - Roger Ramjet
      - My Life Me
      - Voltron (under license from World Events Productions)
      - Worldwide distribution rights to OOglies (excluding UK television rights)
      - Worldwide distribution rights to Tracy Beaker Returns (excluding UK television rights)
      - Non-French licensing and distribution rights to The Owl & Co
      - Tribune Content Agency library
      - Golden Book Video/Golden Books Family Entertainment/Western Publishing/Gold Key Comics library
        - Broadway Video's former family entertainment library
          - Tomorrow Entertainment library (pre-1974)
            - Rankin/Bass Productions (pre-September 1974)
          - Total TeleVision Productions library (excluding the film adaptation of Underdog, owned by Disney)
        - Shari Lewis' two PBS series (Lamb Chop's Play-Along and The Charlie Horse Music Pizza)
        - Color Systems Technology, Inc.
          - Alan Enterprises
            - The Edward Small library
      - Big Idea Entertainment
      - Entertainment Rights
        - Carrington Productions International
        - Link Entertainment
        - Filmation (excluding third-party licensed properties)
          - He-Man (1983 TV series and related specials and films) and She-Ra (1985 TV series and 2019 TV series) (under license from Mattel)
        - Woodland Animations
        - Tell-Tale Productions (excluding the rights to Tweenies, owned by BBC Studios)
        - Sleepy Kids
        - Maddocks Animation
        - Other programs formerly under Entertainment Rights that were produced by other production companies
      - Chapman Entertainment
      - Bullwinkle Studios (joint venture with Jay Ward Productions)
  - Universal Animation Studios
  - Oswald the Lucky Rabbit (the character, and the first 52 M. J. Winkler, George Winkler, and Charles Mintz-produced, and Friz Freleng, and Hugh Harman-animated, and final 138 Walter Lantz-directed, animated, and produced cartoon shorts)
  - Walter Lantz Productions
  - Illumination library (studio is "exclusive financing and distribution" partner with Universal)
  - Focus Features film library (excluding films owned by third-party companies)
    - Good Machine
    - Gramercy Pictures
    - USA Films
      - Part of the October Films library
      - Savoy Pictures
    - Universal Focus/Universal Classics
    - Focus World
    - Rogue Pictures (pre-2010)
  - Working Title Films
    - WT^{2} Productions
  - PolyGram Filmed Entertainment film library (post-March 1996)
  - Castle Films/Universal 8
  - Amblin Partners film library
    - Amblin Entertainment (only films released by Universal Pictures)
    - DreamWorks Pictures film library (post-2016)
  - Blumhouse Productions film library (minority stake) (only films co-produced with Universal Pictures)
  - Back Lot Music discography
  - United International Pictures

==== NBCUniversal Media Group ====
- NBCUniversal Studio Group
  - Universal Television library
    - Revue Studios
    - MCA TV
      - MTE
    - Multimedia Entertainment
    - Studios USA Television
    - PolyGram Television (post-1996)
    - USA Cable Entertainment
    - Wolf Entertainment
    - Universal International Studios
      - Heyday Television (joint venture with Heyday Films)
      - Chocolate Media
      - Lark Productions
      - Lucky Giant
      - Monkey Kingdom
      - Matchbox Pictures
      - Carnival Films
    - EMKA, Ltd.
      - Paramount Pictures film library (post-1928 and pre-1950) (excluding fourteen films owned by Paramount themselves, the films Second Chorus and Mr. Bug Goes to Town owned by Paramount through Melange Pictures, and some films that are either in the public domain or owned by third-party companies)
    - Working Title Television
    - Telemundo originals
      - Telemundo of Puerto Rico Studios
      - Telemundo Studios
        - Telemundo Global Studios
        - Telemundo Streaming Studios
      - Underground Producciones
      - Telemundo Films
    - Amblin Television (excluding co-productions with other companies)
      - DreamWorks Television (post-2008) (excluding co-productions with other companies)
    - NBC Studios (international distribution rights to the pre-2004 library are owned by MGM Television, and In the House and The Fresh Prince of Bel-Air are distributed by Warner Bros. Television Studios due to a pre-NBCU syndication deal)
      - NBC Enterprises
      - SNL Studios (joint venture with Lorne Michaels)
    - NBC Entertainment
    - NBC International
    - DreamWorks Animation Television
    - Universal Content Productions
    - Universal Television Alternative Studio
- NBCUniversal News Group
  - NBC News
    - CNBC
    - MSNBC
    - NBC News Studios
      - MSNBC Films
    - NBC News International
    - Peacock Productions
- Hayu originals
- Peacock originals
- USA Cable Entertainment library
  - Syfy originals
  - Bravo originals
  - E! originals
    - E! Studios
      - Wilshire Studios
    - Style/Esquire Network originals
  - Oxygen originals
  - Universal Kids originals
  - G4 Media
  - Chiller originals
  - Cloo originals
    - Trio originals (post-2000)
  - Fearnet originals (excluding series produced by Sony Pictures Television and Lionsgate Television)
- Seeso originals

=== Sky Group ===
- Galaxy originals
- Now originals
- The Movie Channel originals
- Sky Cinema film library
- Challenge originals
- Sky Mix originals
- Sky Television Network library
- Sky News
  - Sky News Ireland
- Sky Sports
- Sky Scottish
- Sky Soap
- Sky Store
- Sky Box Office library
  - Sky Sports Box Office library
- Amstrad
- Sky Studios
  - Jupiter Entertainment library
    - Ginx TV
  - Love Productions library
  - Skybound Stories library
  - Transistor Films library
  - Znak & Co.
- The Power Station
- .tv
- SkyShowtime original films
- Acetrax
- Sky España
- Sky Vision

== See also ==
- List of NBCUniversal television programs
- List of assets owned by Comcast
- Lists of Universal Pictures films
