= Shop Smart, Save Money =

Shop Smart, Save Money may refer to:

- Shop Smart, Save Money (2018 TV series)
- Shop Smart, Save Money (2023 TV series)
