= True North Productions =

British television production company

- Type: Limited
- Industry: Television production
- Founded: 2002; 24 years ago, Leeds, United Kingdom
- Founder: Jess Fowle; Glyn Middleton; Andrew Sheldon
- Headquarters: Leeds, United Kingdom
- Number of locations: 2
- Key people: Norma Wisvenitz (CEO); Kathy Thorogood (chief creative officer)
- Parent: Sky Vision (2017–2019); Sky Studios (2019–present)
- Website: truenorth.tv

True North Productions is an independent British television production company based in Leeds, West Yorkshire. The company creates factual programmes and series in a wide variety of genres, including observational documentary, true crime, current affairs, history, food, property, and children's content. Their programmes have been sold via mucho distributors to broadcasters throughout the world and have been screened in numerous countries, including the United States, Australia, Russia, and Africa.

The company was established in 2002 by Jess Fowle, Glyn Middleton and Andrew Sheldon, three producers and directors who had previously worked for Yorkshire Television's documentaries department. They chose the company name as a way of highlighting its northern roots. After several years based at Yorkshire Television's Kirkstall Road studios, in 2009 the company moved its production base to Marshall's Mill, a converted flax spinning mill in Holbeck, close to Leeds city centre. As well as housing its production teams it also created a dedicated post-production operation, with 21 edit suites (both off-line and on-line) and a standalone dubbing suite.

== History ==
In 2012, True North expanded its operation across the Pennines to Greater Manchester, with a second office in the Media City, Salford.

In 2014, the company was the first to receive investment from Channel 4's Indie Growth Fund, a £20 million pot of cash designed to support and nurture independent TV production companies in the UK and help them scale up their business. As part of the deal the broadcaster took a minority share in the company. In the same year, co-founder Glyn Middleton departed the business.

In 2017, Channel 4 sold their stake in True North Productions to Sky Vision, whose investment saw them become the majority shareholder in the business. It represented the Indie Growth Funds' first successful exit and deal brought the company into a stable that also includes Love Productions, the maker of The Great British Bake Off.

True North Productions were ranked in the top 5 in "The Prolific North's" Top 50 Independent Production Companies in 2018.

== Programming ==
=== Current productions ===
- A New Life In The Sun (Series 11) – in production for Channel Four
- Help! We Bought A Village (Series Four) in production for Channel Four
- Forensics: Catching the Killer (Series Five) – in production for Sky Crime

=== Filmography ===
NOTE: Source for this section as follows:

- Real Life: The Lottery Liar (2002, ITV1)
- Real Life: Fighting For Danny (2002, ITV1)
- Secrets of the Royal Kitchen (2002, Five)
- Killer in the Woods (2003, Five)
- Steamtown (2003, BBC Two)
- Crimefighters (2004–6, ITV1)
- Who's Taking Your Daughter Home, Tonight? (2004, ITV1)
- MacIntyre's Big Sting (2004–6, Five)
- ONE life: The Woman In Me (2004, BBC One)
- Frock 'n' Roll (2004, ITV1)
- Flying Scotsman Comes Home (2004, BBC Two)
- Real Life: Children of the Miners' Strike (2004, ITV1)
- Steaming Back To Scarborough (2004, BBC Two)
- Boots And Suits: The Changing Face of the BNP (2004, ITV1)
- ONE life: Asleep At The Wheel (2004, BBC One)
- Animal 24:7 (2004, Yorkshire Television)
- Headline Crime (2004, ITV1)
- Real Story: Death of a Policeman (2004, BBC One)
- The Sage, Gateshead: A Celebration (2004, BBC Two)
- People's War: Bombs And Bread (2005, BBC Two)
- People's War: A Woman's Place (2005, BBC Two)
- ONE life: The Ripper Murdered My Mum (2005, BBC One)
- Saving Zain (2005, ITV1)
- Xposed (2005, ITV1)
- My Yorkshire (2005–8, ITV1)
- Real Life: The Boy They Call Chucky (2005, ITV1)
- Trapped Inside My Body (2005, ITV1)
- Henry's Wives, with Terry Deary (2005, BBC Two)
- Real Families: My Mums Used To Be Men (2005, ITV1)
- The Way We Were (2006–8, ITV1)
- Ripper Hoaxer – The Real Story (2006, BBC One)
- Terry Deary's Twisted Tales (2006, ITV1)
- Fiery Fred: A Yorkshire Legend (2006, BBC One)
- Working The Sea: The Lifeboat (2006, BBC Two)
- The Way We Worshipped (2006, ITV1)
- ONE life: Getting Away With Murder (2006, BBC One)
- Animal 24:7 (2006–10, BBC One)
- Ghosts of Christmas Past (2006, BBC Two)
- ONE life: The Woman Who Can't Stop Lying (2007, BBC One)
- Extraordinary People: The Twins Who Share A Body (2007, Five)
- Christa Does Bollywood (2007, BBC One)
- Building Britain (2007, BBC One)
- The Way We Were On Holiday (2007, ITV1)
- Saving Planet Earth (2007, BBC Two)
- My Fake Baby (2008, Channel 4)
- Animal Rescue Squad (2008–9, Five)
- Sunday Life (2008, BBC One)
- One Man And His Canoe: The John Darwin Story (2008, ITV1)
- Down The Line (2008, BBC Two)
- How To Survive The Property Crisis (2008, BBC One)
- Real Crime: Killer on the Run (2008, ITV1)
- Real Crime: Angel of Death (2008, ITV1)
- Shannon: The Mother of All Lies – a Panorama Special (2008, BBC One)
- Anne Diamond's War On Fat (2009, Sky Real Lives)
- Killer Couples (2009, Crime & Investigation Network)
- Cutting Edge: Addicted To Surrogacy (2009, Channel 4)
- In Search of England's Green And Pleasant Land (2009, BBC One)
- Churchill's German Army (2009, National Geographic Channel)
- Calendar Girls – Ten Years On (2009, BBC One)
- Extraordinary People: The Man Who Shared His Liver (2009, Five)
- Youth Hostelling – The First 100 Years (2009, BBC Two)
- Michaela's Animal Road Trip (2009, Five)
- Dispatches: Cops On The Cheap? (2009, Channel 4)
- Panorama: Freed To Offend Again? (2009, BBC One)
- Killer in the Family (2009, Crime & Investigation Network)
- To Build Or Not To Build (2009–2011, BBC One)
- Britain's Underworld (2010–2011, National Geographic Channel)
- Food Fighters (2010–2011, BBC One)
- Cumbrian Murders – The Untold Story (2010, Discovery Europe)
- Stealing Shakespeare (2010, BBC One)
- Real Crime: PC Sharon Beshenivsky – Death on Duty (2010, ITV1)
- Dick & Dom Go Wild (2011, CBBC)
- Panorama: Forgotten Heroes (2011, BBC One)
- My Dad's Army (2011, ITV1)
- The Big Flutter – Grand National On Film (2011, BBC One)
- Britain's Toughest Cops (2011, Discovery Europe)
- Jon Venables: What Went Wrong? (2011, BBC One)
- What The Neighbours Did (2011, UKTV Home)
- I'm Pregnant With Their Baby (2011, BBC One)
- Battle of Wills (2011, Crime & Investigation Network)
- Stormchaser: The Butterfly and The Tornado (2011, BBC Three)
- Inside The Riots: Panorama (2011, BBC One)
- Murder On The Social Network (2011, Crime & Investigation Network)
- Married, Single, Dead (2011, Crime & Investigation Network)
- When Life Means Life (2012, Crime & Investigation Network)
- Bloody Tales of the Tower (2012, National Geographic Channel)
- Dispatches: Undercover Undertaker (2012, Channel 4)
- Panorama: Life and Debt – A Greek Tragedy (2012, BBC One)
- The Valleys – Series One (2012, MTV)
- Panorama: How Safe Is Your Hospital? (2012, BBC One)
- Witness: Beast of Bermondsey (2013, Crime & Investigation Network)
- Compare Your Life (2013, Channel 4)
- The Valleys: Series Two (2013, MTV)
- Animal Frontline (2013, BBC One)
- Bloody Tales – Series Two (2013, National Geographic Channel)
- My New Hand (2013, BBC One)
- Junior Vets (2013, CBBC)
- Beauty School Cop-Outs (2013, MTV)
- Building The Dream – (2013–present, More4)
- When Life Means Life – Series Two (2013, Crime & Investigation Network)
- Hens Behaving Badly (2013–14, Five)
- Churchill's German Army (2014, National Geographic Channel)
- Return of the Black Death (2014, Channel 4)
- My Derelict Dream Home (2014, UKTV Home)
- Closing Time (2014, Five)
- D-Day's Sunken Secrets (2014, Five)
- Junior Vets – Series Two (2014, CBBC)
- What The Neighbours Did (2014, UKTV Home)
- Animal SOS (2014, BBC One)
- Homes By The Sea (2014, More4)
- Bent Coppers (2015, Five)
- Dispatches: Trains. Are You Paying Too Much? (2015, Channel 4)
- The Man With No Penis (2015, TLC)
- Homes By The Sea – Series Two (2015, More4)
- London's Lost Graveyard (2015, Channel 4)
- Junior Vets: On Call (2015, CBBC)
- Tina Malone: My New Body (2015, TLC)
- Gift Of Life (2015, Five)
- The Last Leg Goes Down Under (2016, Channel 4)
- A New Life In The Sun (2016–present, Channel 4)
- Coastal Walks With My Dog (2016, More4)
- Homes By The Med (2016, More4)
- The Mystery Of The Crossrail Skulls (2016, Channel 4)
- Junior Vets: On Call – Series Two (2016, CBBC)
- The Battle of Jutland: The Navy's Bloodiest Day (2016, BBC Two)
- The Lie Detective (2016, Channel 4)
- Teen Mom UK (2016 to present, MTV UK)
- Homes By The Sea – Series Three (2016, More4)
- First Day at Big School (2016, Five)
- China's Forgotten Emperor (2016, Channel 4)
- Rambling Shorts (2016, Channel 4)
- Too Many Cooks (2016, Channel 4)
- Breaking The Silence (2016, Channel 4)
- Climbing The Property Ladder (2017, Five)
- Walks With My Dog (2017, More4)
- Homes By The Med – Series Two (2017, More4)
- Brexit: Crisis on the Wards (2017, Channel 4)
- The Mystery of the Man on the Moor (2017, Channel 4)
- A1: Britain's Longest Road (2017–2019, BBC One)
- The Pets Factor (2017 to 2020, CBBC)
- The Yorkshire Dales & The Lakes (2017 to present, More4)
- Walks With My Dog – Series Two (2018, More4)
- Million Dollar Baby (2018 MTV UK)
- Smashing Hits! The 80s Pop Road Map (2018 BBC Four)
- M1: The Road That Made Britain (2018 Five)
- Building The Dream (Series Seven) – in production for More4.
- Say Yes To The Dress Lancashire (2018 – 2020 TLC)
- Shop Smart Save Money (2018 Five)
- Gross Up (2021–2022, E4)
- Custom Kicks (2021, E4)
- Renovation Nation (2021 – present Channel 4)
- Help! We Bought A Village (2020 – present Channel 4)
