= List of assets owned by Comcast =

Here is a list of assets owned by American global telecommunications conglomerate Comcast.

== Comcast Holdings Corporation ==
- Xfinity (Comcast Cable Communications, LLC)
  - Comcast Business
    - Nitel
  - Comcast Interactive Media
    - StreamSage
  - Comcast Cable Holdings, LLC (formerly AT&T Broadband Corporation)
  - Comcast MO Group, LLC (formerly Media One or Bell West)
  - Comcast MO of Delaware, LLC
  - Comcast Phone LLC
  - Comcast IP Phone LLC
  - CN900 (Michigan)
  - CN81 (Indiana)
  - Comcast Wholesale
  - Xfinity Mobile
  - Xfinity Streampix
  - Xumo
- Comcast Spectacor operating sports and entertainment venues
  - Spectra
  - ComcastTIX
  - Maine Mariners (ECHL)
  - Paciolan
  - Philadelphia Flyers
    - Gritty
    - On the Fly Productions
  - Philadelphia Wings
  - Philadelphia Fusion (CS Philadelphia OW Team, LLC)
  - Xfinity Mobile Arena
  - T1 Entertainment & Sports (34% with SK Telecom and Highland Capital)
    - T1
- Comcast Advertising
- Comcast Technology Solutions
- Comcast Ventures (formerly Comcast Interactive Capital)
  - Managed Satellite Distribution
- FreeWheel
- Watchwith
- Hitz
- Midco (49%)
- Music Choice LLC (Minority stake with Cox Communications, Charter Communications, Microsoft, Arris International and Sony Corporation of America)
  - Music Choice

== Former assets ==
=== Divested ===
- iMedia Brands Inc. (12.5%)
  - ShopHQ
- Leisure Arts
- MGM Holdings (20%, with Sony Corporation of America, Providence Equity Partners, TPG Capital, DLJ Merchant Banking Partners and Quadrangle Group), split in 2010 due to the emergence from bankruptcy, currently owned by Amazon as Amazon MGM Studios.
- Comcast SportsNet Houston
- Loews Cineplex Entertainment: Sold to Onex Corporation and Oaktree Capital Management in 2002
- QVC: Comcast sold its majority stake to Liberty Media in 2003
- Speed Channel: joint venture with Cox Communications and Fox Entertainment Group; Fox acquired Comcast and Cox's stakes in 2001
- Time Warner Entertainment (26%, with Time Warner Inc.): Comcast sold its 26% stake to Time Warner Inc. (now Warner Bros. Discovery) in 2003.

=== Dormant or shuttered ===
- Adelphia Communications Corporation: assets acquired by Time Warner Cable and Comcast in 2006
- Comcast Entertainment Television (CET)
- Comcast Television 2 (Michigan)
- Commuter Cable
- ExerciseTV (with Time Warner Cable, New Balance, and Jake Steinfeld)
- Group W Cable
- In Demand Networks (33.3% with Cox Communications and Charter Communications)
- Susquehanna Communications
- TVWorks (67% with Cox Communications)
  - MetaTV
- Xfinity 3D
- Patriot Media
- MOJO HD (with Cox Communications and Time Warner Cable)

== See also ==
- Lists of corporate assets
- List of libraries owned by Comcast
