= Tilery =

Coordinates: 54°34′28″N 1°18′24″W

- Unitary authority: Stockton-on-Tees
- Ceremonial county: County Durham
- Region: North East
- Country: England
- Sovereign state: United Kingdom
- Post town: STOCKTON-ON-TEES
- Postcode district: TS20
- Police: Cleveland
- Fire: Cleveland
- Ambulance: North East

Tilery is a housing estate in Stockton-on-Tees within the borough of Stockton-on-Tees and the ceremonial county of County Durham, England. It is situated to the north of the town centre and is located next to the Portrack housing estate.

The area of Tilery is much smaller than Portrack. Tilery has a small row of shops which run along the border of Norton Road. There is one school in Tilery, the Tilery Primary School which is located in St Ann's Terrace. HM Prison Holme House is situated to the east of the estate. There were a number of pubs located within Tilery such as the Wild Ox and the Blue Nile which have now closed.

In 2015, the area was the second setting in the controversial show Benefits Street. The show primarily filmed on the Kingston Road area of Tilery. Benefits Street has been labelled by critics as "Poverty Porn". One resident of the Tilery estate was critical of the show saying “It’s not just those who are taking part in the show who will be labelled, we all will. When the kids go to school and tell their friends where they are from, or when someone applies for a job and the employer sees the address, it’s almost inevitable that they will be prejudged". The Guardian newspaper described the area as the most deprived ward in Stockton-on-Tees, saying the estate is plagued by high unemployment, low pay and poor health.

Neil Maxwell who was one of the residents featured in the Benefits Street show was jailed for life in 2019 with a minimum term of 30 years as a result of the murder of Lee Cooper. Maxwell, along with an accomplice named Luke Pearson, had brutally beaten Cooper in what the judge called "a rampage of violence".
