= Poverty porn =

Media that exploits the condition of the poor

Poverty porn, also known as pornography of poverty or stereotype porn, has been defined as "any type of media, be it written, photographed or filmed, which exploits the poor's condition in order to generate the necessary sympathy for selling newspapers, increasing charitable donations, or support for a given cause". It also suggests that the viewer of the exploited protagonists is motivated by gratification of base instincts. It is also a term of criticism applied to films that objectify people in poverty for the sake of entertaining a privileged audience.

== Origins ==
The concept of poverty porn was first introduced in the 1980s, known as the "golden age of charity campaigns". Charity campaigns during this period made use of hard-hitting images such as pictures of malnourished children with flies in their eyes. This quickly became a trend and there were several notable campaigns such as Live Aid. Though some of these campaigns were successful in raising money for charity (over $150 million to help combat famine), some observers criticised the approach, claiming it oversimplified chronic poverty; this apparent sensationalism was dubbed by critics as "poverty porn."

In the 1980s, the media used what some believed to be inappropriate use of children in poverty. However, towards the end of this era more positive images emerged to tell their stories, although, in the 2010s, it was noticed that the disturbing images were being highlighted once more.

The term "poverty porn" itself was introduced years later. One of the earliest examples was the review of the film Angela's Ashes (1999) published in the January 2000 edition of the e-newsletter Need to Know. In this review, the term was not defined but was used to describe the film's depiction of poverty as a "ponderous vomit-packed poverty porn".

== In charity ==
The practice is controversial, as some believe it to be exploitative, whilst others praise the way it can raise awareness of the issue of poverty. It has been common for charity organisations such as UNICEF and Oxfam to portray famine, poverty, and children in order to attract sympathy and increase donations. Although poverty porn can be seen as a tool to generate further donations, many believe it deforms reality as it portrays the image of an impotent society, entirely dependent on other western societies to survive, as well as being overly voyeuristic.

It is a common debate to have as to whether it is justifiable or not to portray stereotypes and to use sensationalism in order to generate empathy. Chimamanda Ngozi Adichie, a Nigerian writer, said that "The problem with stereotypes is not that they are untrue, but that they are incomplete. They make one story become the only story."

Throughout fundraising campaigns, charities attempt to interview those who they are trying to help, in order to get the word across to the general public. However, it is common for them to encounter ongoing refusal from those in desolated situations to take pictures or to publicly share their traumatic story. This further emphasizes the concept that being in an uneasy, not to say miserable, situation is a shameful one, and poverty porn in media exposes those who do not necessarily have the desire to be exposed.

In one case, this "need" for voices to justify this style of fundraising resulted in an organization creating fictional "needy children", and sending out emotional letters, "written by" these nonexistent individuals. CNN exposed a school in South Dakota that raised millions of dollars by using "the worst of poverty porn," saying that "a school run by non-Indians is raising a fortune off of racial stereotypes."

== In media ==
Poverty porn is used in media through visually miserable and disturbing images, that aim to trigger some sort of emotion amongst its audience. However, for many people in situations of extreme poverty, exposing one's misery publicly through images, interviews and other means, is an unacceptable invasion of privacy which can lead to verbal abuse and even violence.

The use of one photo to label an entire country as destitute makes the audience falsely assume that the entire country share the same story.

Alli Heller, a Nigerian writer and anthropologist says: "Imagine for a minute that you were chronically incontinent. Now imagine that you didn't have access to adult diapers or sanitary napkins ... Imagine how the acidity of the unremitting flow of urine burned away at your thighs, cracking your skin and leaving you vulnerable to painful infections. Imagine the shame you'd feel – a grown adult incapable of avoiding the small pool of urine you'd leave behind on a friend's chair after a visit ... Why must we highlight the extreme cases when the norm is bad enough?"

== In politics ==
In the West, "poverty porn" also found prominent usage in the political sphere. It is referenced by the left as an expression for deliberately misleading impressions of the lives of the poor in the process of victimizing them while the right deploys the term as part of its indictment of the welfare state.

== In popular culture ==
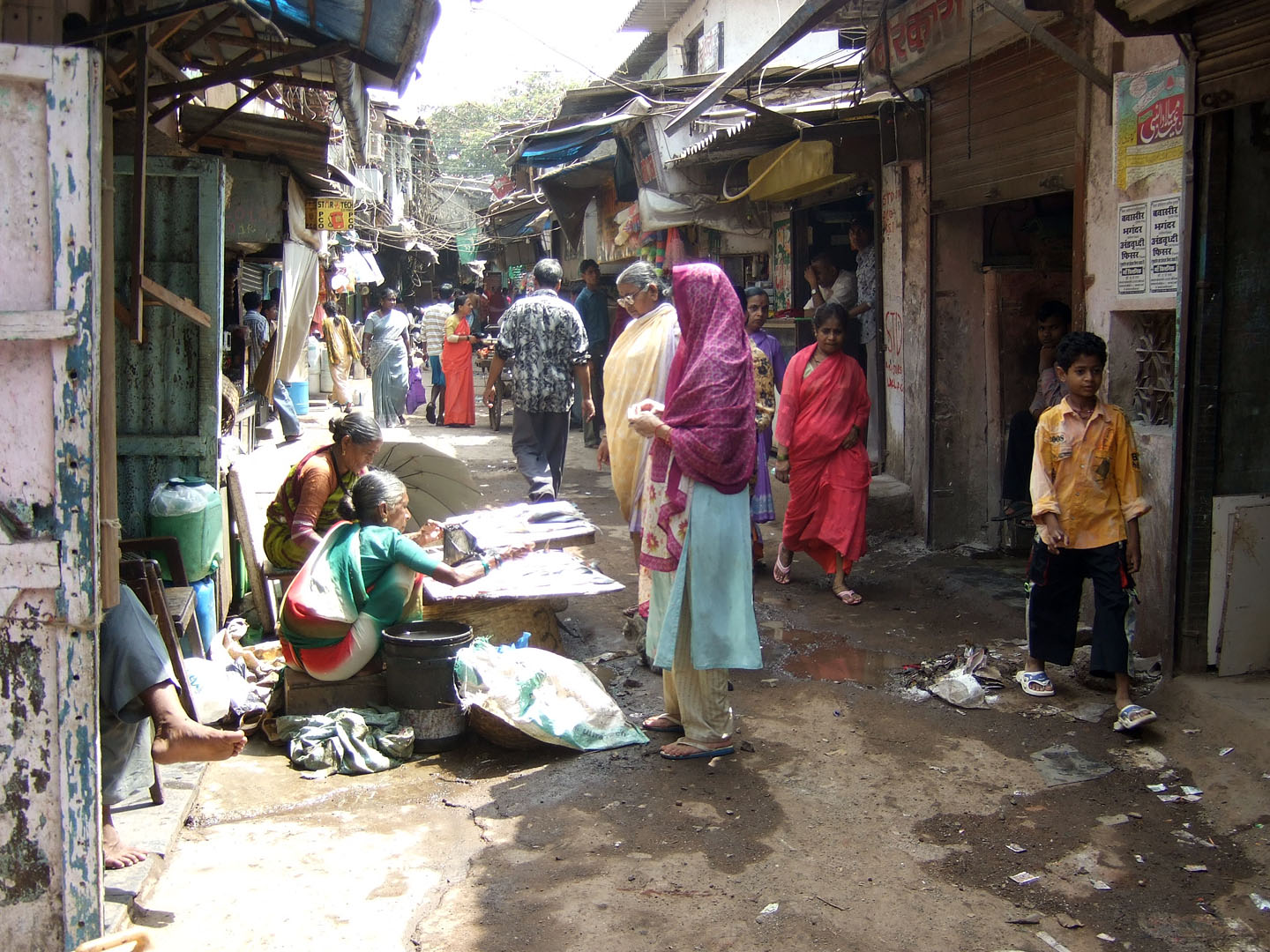
Dharavi slum in Mumbai, India, was featured in the 2008 film Slumdog Millionaire.

Poverty porn is highly exposed in today's pop culture, as the concept has become pervasive in films and TV shows.

=== Reality TV ===
The British television program The Hardest Grafter illustrates this as it portrays 25 of Britain's "poorest workers," all having the shared ultimate objective of winning £15,000 through the completion of various tasks. In this case, the contestants' poverty attracts a television audience which was, before the show even started, contested as various petitions were made in order to stop what was believed to be a "perverted audience and profit making operation." It is considered to not only be perverted, but also discriminatory as the contestants can only be poor.

BBC Two replied to these accusations by affirming that it would be a "serious social experiment to show just how hard those part of the low-wage economy work" as well as "tackling some of the most pressing issues of our time: why is British productivity low?"

A spokesman from the show's production company, Twenty Twenty, stated that: "the show will challenge and shatter all sorts of myths surrounding the low-paid and unemployed sector."

Broome, a reality TV show creator, states that it exposes the hardship of some families and their ability to keep on going through values, love and communication. He assures that he would much prefer to create these shows rather than those like Jersey Shore which depicts "a group of strangers from New Jersey as they party throughout six seasons."

== Associated works ==
- Hillbilly Elegy
- Can't Pay? We'll Take It Away!
- The Scheme
- Benefits Street
- Slumdog Millionaire
- Born Into Brothels
- Famous, Rich and Hungry
- Rich Hill
- Struggle Street
- The Last Face
- Donnybrook
- Extreme Makeover: Home Edition
- Nomadland
- Lola
- The Briefcase
- Tom's Shoes
- Purna Bahadur Ko Sarangi
- Vaazhai

== See also ==
- Charity record, songs produced with the proceeds donated to charity or marginalized groups
- Inspiration porn, in coverage of people with disabilities
- Slum tourism
