= Jeremy Darroch =

English businessman, current Executive chairman of Sky Group

Sir Jeremy Darroch
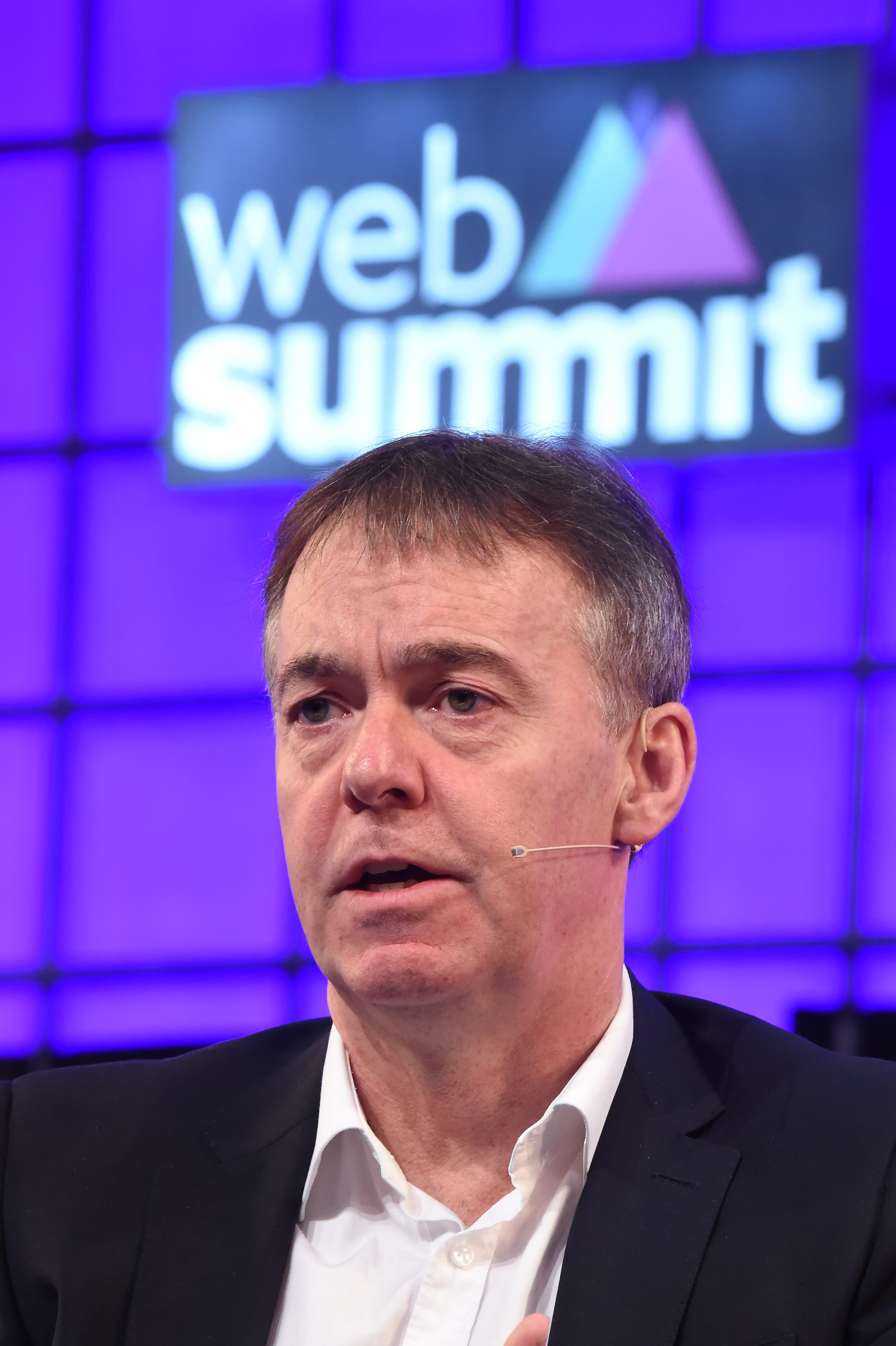
- Born: David Jeremy Darroch; 18 July 1962 (age 64); Alnwick, Northumberland, England
- Education: Dukes Grammar School; University of Hull
- Occupation: Businessman
- Title: Executive chairman, Sky Group
- Term: December 2021–present; Chair of the Board, Reckitt 2024–present
- Spouse: Rachel Darroch
- Children: 3

Sir David Jeremy Darroch (born 18 July 1962) is a British business executive who was the chief executive of Sky from December 2007 until becoming executive chairman in January 2021.

== Early life and education ==
He was born and brought up in Alnwick, Northumberland, the son of a tax inspector, and the grandson of a miner. He attended Dukes Grammar School (a boys-only grammar school which became Dukes Middle School in 1977) in Alnwick.

Darroch has a bachelor's degree in economics from the University of Hull.

== Career ==
Darroch worked for Procter & Gamble for twelve years from 1988, eventually becoming European finance director of its healthcare business. He then worked for DSG Dixons Group under the aegis of Ian Livingston, before replacing him in the role of FD.

=== Sky ===
Darroch joined Sky (previously known as Sky plc before Comcast's takeover in 2018, and British Sky Broadcasting before the European acquisitions in 2014) in August 2004 as chief financial officer. He became chief executive of Sky in December 2007 and sold the organisation to Comcast in 2018. In 2017, Darroch was the UK's 4th highest earning chief executive, receiving a salary of £16.3 million.

In January 2021, it was announced that Darroch would be standing down as chief executive, and will become executive chairman of Sky, remaining in post throughout 2021, and will then be an advisor to the company. He was succeeded by Dana Strong.

Darroch was knighted in the 2023 Birthday Honours for services to business, charity and sustainability.

=== Later career ===
Darroch was appointed chair of the National Oceanography Centre in October 2022.

Darroch became a non-executive director for Reckitt plc in November 2022, becoming chair in May 2024.

Darroch joined the board of The Walt Disney Company as a director in 2024.

== Personal life ==
In July 2010, he received an honorary degree from the University of Hull. He is on the board of the Youth Sport Trust and the Council for Industry and Higher Education.
