= Dana Strong =

American business executive

- Born: July 1970 (age 56); Ohio, U.S.
- Education: University of Pennsylvania (BA)
- Title: CEO of Sky Group

Dana Strong CBE (born July 1970) is an American business executive, the CEO of Sky Group, a British media and telecommunications conglomerate. Previously, she was president of consumer services at Comcast Cable (now Xfinity) and held various roles at Liberty Global. Strong became group chief executive of Sky in 2021.

== Early life ==
Strong was born in Ohio in July 1970. She earned a dual degree from the University of Pennsylvania with a bachelor of science in economics from the Wharton School of Business and a bachelor of arts with a major in history from the University of Pennsylvania College of Arts and Sciences.

== Career ==
Strong joined Australian telecommunications firm Austar in 1999, and was appointed chief operating officer in 2002.

In January 2011, it was announced that Strong was to join UPC Ireland as CEO from May 2011.

Strong joined Virgin Media as COO in June 2013, and moved on to parent company Liberty Global as a senior vice-president and chief transformation officer in January 2015. Strong joined Comcast Cable in January 2018 as president of consumer services. Strong succeeded Jeremy Darroch as chief executive of Sky in January 2021.
