= Sky Group =

British media and telecommunications conglomerate

Sky Group Limited
- Logo used since 2025

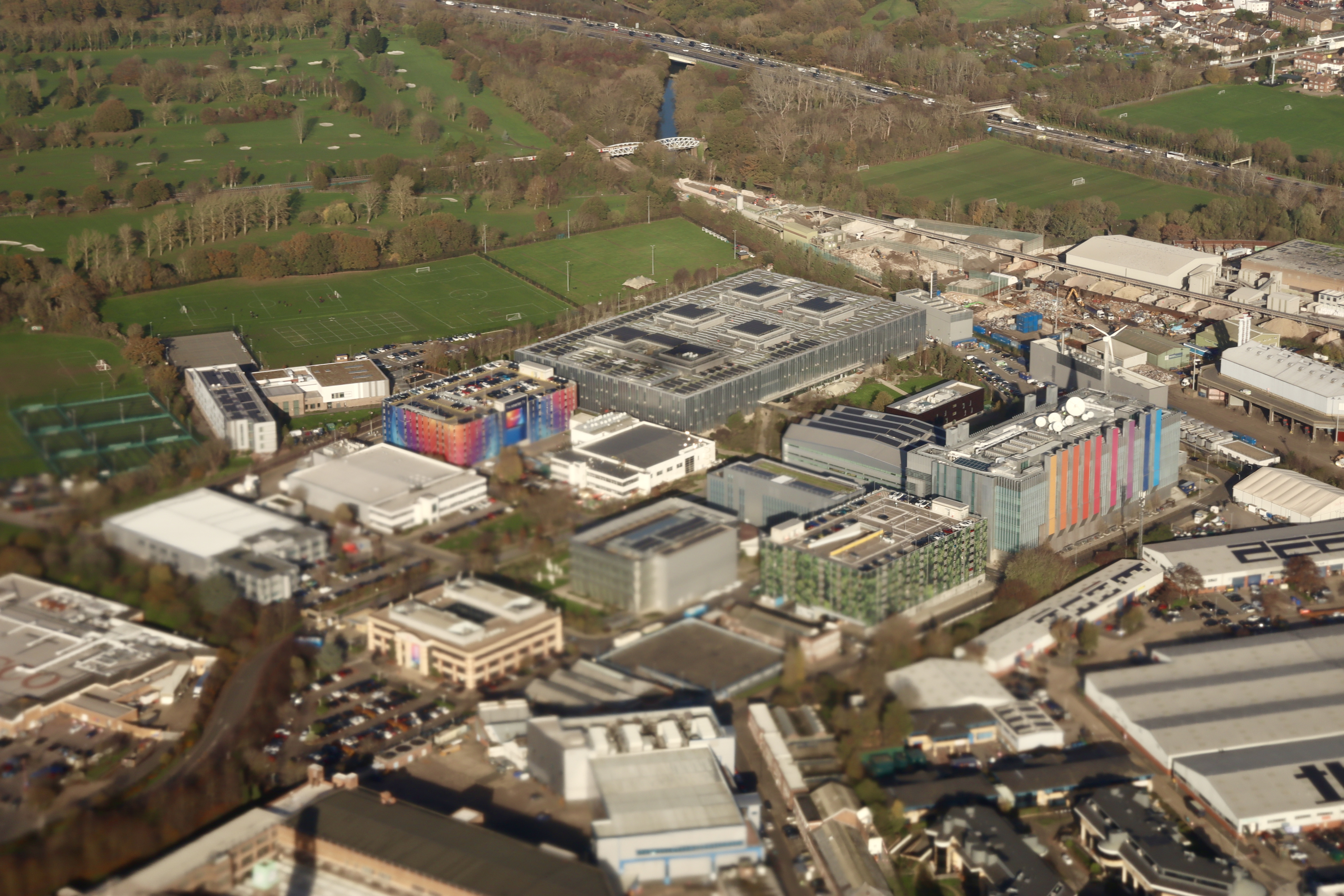
- Sky Campus, London, England
- Formerly: British Sky Broadcasting plc (1990–2014); Sky plc (2014–19)
- Type: Subsidiary
- Traded as: LSE: SKY (2014–18); LSE: BSY (1994–2014); NYSE: BSY (1994–2010); FTSE 100 component (BSY, 1995–2014); FTSE 100 component (SKY, 2014–18)
- Industry: Telecommunications; Mass media
- Predecessors: Sky Television; British Satellite Broadcasting
- Founded: 2 November 1990; 36 years ago
- Headquarters: Sky Campus; London, England
- Area served: Europe
- Key people: Dana Strong (CEO)
- Products: Direct-broadcast satellite, pay television, broadcasting, broadband and telephony services
- Revenue: ▼£14.5 billion (2022)
- Owner: Comcast
- Number of employees: 32,000 (2021)
- Parent: Comcast (2018–present)
- Divisions: The Cloud; Diagonal View
- Subsidiaries: Sky UK; Sky Italia; Sky Studios; Now (operated by Xfinity in the United States)
- Website: skygroup.sky

Sky Group Limited, trading as Sky, is a British media and telecommunications conglomerate owned by American company Comcast and headquartered in London. It has operations in the United Kingdom, Ireland and Italy. Sky is Europe's largest media company and pay-TV broadcaster by revenue (as of 2018), with 23 million subscribers and more than 31,000 employees as of 2019. The company is primarily involved in satellite television, producing and broadcasting. The current CEO is Dana Strong.

Formed in 1990 by the equal merger of Sky Television and British Satellite Broadcasting, BSkyB became the UK's largest pay television company. In 2014, after completing the acquisition of Sky Italia and Sky Deutschland, the merged company changed its name to Sky plc.

From its founding, Rupert Murdoch's News Corporation held 39.14% of Sky Group, and in June 2010 they attempted to buy out the rest of Sky, but the bid was withdrawn in July 2011 following the News International phone hacking scandal that also led to News Corporation splitting into News Corporation and 21st Century Fox, the latter of which continued to hold News' stake in Sky. In December 2016, 21st Century Fox made a bid to acquire the remaining shares of Sky, pending government approval. After the Walt Disney Company announced that they were to acquire Fox, Comcast initially engaged in a bidding war, but dropped out to acquire Sky instead, outbidding Fox with an offer for £17.28 per share; Fox sold their stake in October 2018, followed by the remaining shareholders a month later. Following this, Comcast's film studios and US television businesses and other media assets are held by NBCUniversal, which is also under its control and was formed when Vivendi sold 80% of Universal Pictures to the now-defunct General Electric, NBC's then-owner.

Before the acquisition by Comcast, Sky was listed on the London Stock Exchange and was a constituent of the FTSE 100 Index. It had a market capitalisation of approximately £18.75 billion (€26.76 billion) in 2018.

== History ==
=== BSkyB ===
==== Formation ====
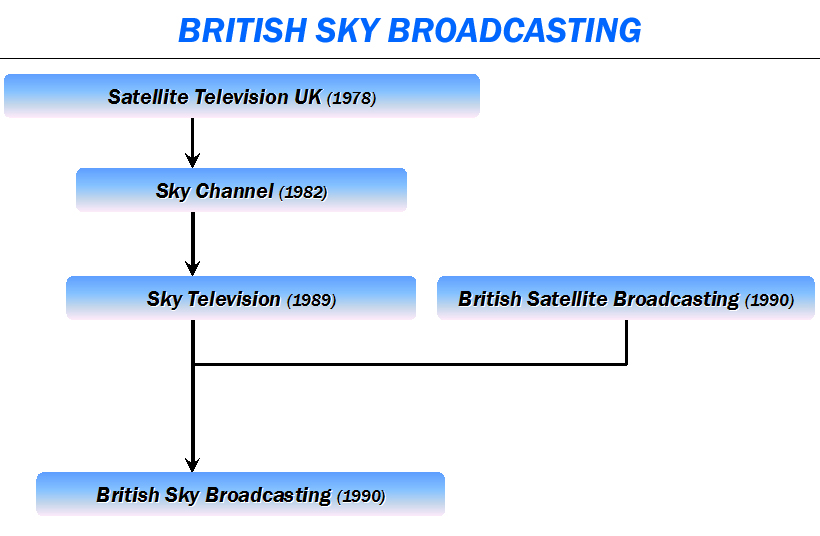

British Sky Broadcasting (BSkyB) was formed by the merger of Sky Television and British Satellite Broadcasting on 2 November 1990. Both companies had begun to struggle financially and were suffering financial losses as they competed against each other for viewers. The Guardian later characterised the merger as "effectively a takeover by News Corporation".

The merger was investigated by the Office of Fair Trading and was cleared a month later since many of the represented views were more concerned about contractual arrangements which had nothing to do with competition. The Independent Broadcasting Authority was not consulted about the deal; after approval, the IBA demanded precise details of the merger, and stated they were considering the repercussions of the deal to ultimately determine whether BSB contracts were null and void. On 17 November, the IBA decided to terminate BSB's contract, but not immediately, as it was deemed unfair to 120,000 viewers who had bought BSB devices.

Sam Chisholm was appointed CEO in a bid to reorganise the new company, which continued to make losses of £10 million per week. The defunct BSB's HQ, Marco Polo House, was sold, 39% of the new company's employees were made redundant to leave just under 1000 employees, and many of the new senior BSkyB executive roles were given to Sky personnel. In April, the nine Sky/BSB channels were condensed into five, with EuroSport being dropped soon after the Sky Sports launch. Chisholm also renegotiated the merged company's expensive deals with the Hollywood studios, slashing the minimum guaranteed payments. The defunct Marcopolo I satellite was sold in December 1993 to Sweden's NSAB, and Marcopolo II went to Norway's Telenor in July 1992 after the Independent Television Commission was unable to find new companies to take over the BSB licences and compete with BSkyB. News International received 50%, Pearson PLC 17.5%, Chargeurs 17.5%, Granada 12%, and Reed International 2% of the new shares in the company.

By September 1991, after losses had been reduced to $30M a week, Rupert Murdoch said "there were strong financial marketing and political reason[s] for making the compromise merger instead of letting BSB die. Many of the lessons had been learnt with more than half the running cost of the combined company". Further cuts in losses were a direct result of 313,000 new customers joining during the first half of 1991. By March 1992, BSkyB posted its first operating profits, of £100,000 per week, with £3.8 million weekly from subscriptions and £1 million from advertising, but continued to be burdened with £1.28 billion of debt. Stockbroker firm James Capel forecast BSkyB would still be indebted in 2000.

In the autumn of 1991, talks were held for the broadcast rights for Premier League for a five-year period, from the 1992 season. British television network ITV were the current rights holders for the Football League, and fought hard to gain the new rights. ITV had increased its offer from £18m to £34m per year to obtain the new rights. BSkyB joined forces with the BBC to make a counter bid. The BBC was given the highlights of most of the matches, while BSkyB paid £304m for the Premier League rights, giving them a monopoly of all live matches, up to 60 per year from the 1992–93 season. Murdoch has described sport as a "battering ram" for pay-television, providing a strong customer base. A few weeks after the deal, ITV went to the High court to get an injunction as it believed their details were leaked before the decision was taken. ITV also asked the Office of Fair Trading to also investigate since it believed Rupert Murdoch's media empire via the newspapers had influenced the deal. A few days later neither action took effect, ITV believed BSkyB was telephoned and informed of its £262m bid, and the Premier League advised BSkyB to increase its counter bid. BSkyB retained the rights paying £670m for the 1997–2001 deal, but was challenged by On Digital for the rights from 2001 to 2004, thus it was forced to pay £1.1 billion which gave it 66 live games a year. Following a lengthy legal battle with the European Commission, which deemed the exclusivity of the rights to be against the interests of competition and the consumer, BSkyB's monopoly came to an end from the 2007–08 season. In May 2006, the Irish broadcaster Setanta Sports was awarded two of the six Premiership packages that the English FA offered to broadcasters. Sky picked up the remaining four for £1.3bn.

==== Becoming a public limited company ====
In October 1994, BSkyB announced its plans to float the company on the UK and US stock exchanges, selling off 20% of the company. The stock flotation reduced Murdoch's holding to 40 per cent and raised £900m, which allowed the company to cut its debt in half. Sam Chisholm said "By any standards this is an excellent result, in every area of the company has performed strongly". Chisholm became one of the world's most highly paid television executives.

In 1995, BSkyB opened its second customer management centre at Dunfermline, Scotland, in addition to its original centre at Livingston which opened in 1989. BSkyB entered the FTSE 100 index, operation profits increased to £155M a year, and Pearson sold off its 17.5% stake in the company.

Sam Chisholm resigned from BSkyB due to a rift with Rupert Murdoch in June 1997. A week later, Murdoch was quoted as saying "I cannot understand the fuss; BSkyB was grossly overpriced", which caused further rifts with the new management.

In 1997, BSkyB formed a partnership with Carlton and Granada to bid for the right for the new digital terrestrial network. In June, it was awarded the right to start the service, ONdigital, under the condition BSkyB withdrew from the group's bid. In February 2003, BSkyB wished to renegotiate its deal with MTV to reduce its payment from £20m. Chief executive Tony Ball said "We're definitely prepared to stare them down if we can't get a sensible deal. MTV, and other channels, have done particularly well out of the growth of Sky but the opportunity for savings is now there and Sky will be taking it," he added. "MTV has done extremely well out of that original deal." On 17 April 2003 BSkyB launched its own range of music channels Scuzz, Flaunt and The Amp, as part of its plan to create its own original channels for the platform. Within 18 months the channels failed to make impact, and were outsourced to the Chart Show Channels company.

Shortly afterwards it acquired Artsworld, giving a majority of subscribers full access to the channel. The buyout was part of James Murdoch's strategy to improve the perceptions BSkyB which could lead to potential new subscribers. John Cassy, the channel manager of Artsworld, said: "It is great news for the arts that a dedicated cultural channel will be available to millions of households."

In early 2007, Freeview overtook Sky Digital with nearly 200,000 more subscribers at the end of 2006, while cable broadcaster Virgin Media had three million customers. In July 2007, BSkyB announced the takeover of Amstrad for £125m, a 23.7% premium on its market capitalisation.

BSkyB and Virgin Media announced that they had reached agreement for the acquisition by BSkyB of Virgin Media Television. Virgin1 was also a part of the deal and was rebranded as Channel One on 3 September 2010, as the Virgin name was not licensed to Sky. The new carriage deals are understood to be for up to nine years. The deal was completed in July 2010 and Virgin Media Television was renamed Living TV Group.

In June 2010, News Corporation made a bid for complete ownership of BSkyB. However, following the News International phone hacking scandal, critics and politicians began to question the appropriateness of the proposed takeover. The resulting reaction forced News Corp. to withdraw its bid for the company in July 2011. The scandal forced the resignation of James Murdoch, who was the chairman of both BSkyB and News International, from his executive positions in the UK, with Nicholas Ferguson taking over as Chairman of BSkyB. In September 2012, Ofcom ruled that BSkyB was still fit to hold broadcast licenses in the UK, but criticised James Murdoch's handling of the scandal. On 28 June 2013, News Corporation was split into two publicly traded companies; the company's publishing operations (including News International, renamed News UK) and broadcasting operations in Australia were spun into a new company known as News Corp, while the company's broadcast media assets, including its 39.14% stake in Sky, were renamed 21st Century Fox.

==== European acquisitions ====
On 12 May 2014, BSkyB confirmed that it was in talks with its largest shareholder, 21st Century Fox, about acquiring 21st Century Fox's 57.4% stake in Sky Deutschland and its 100% stake in Sky Italia. The enlarged company (dubbed "Sky Europe" in the media) would consolidate 21st Century Fox's European digital TV assets into one company. The £4.9 billion takeover deal was formally announced on 25 July, where BSkyB would acquire 21st Century Fox's stakes in Sky Deutschland and Sky Italia. BSkyB also made a required takeover offer to Sky Deutschland's minority shareholders, resulting in BSkyB acquiring 89.71% of Sky Deutschland's share capital. The acquisitions were completed on 13 November.

=== Sky plc ===
British Sky Broadcasting Group plc changed its name to Sky plc to reflect the European acquisitions, and the United Kingdom operations were renamed Sky UK Limited. Sky plc bought out the remaining minority shareholders in Sky Deutschland during 2015, using a squeeze-out procedure to obtain the remaining shares and delist Sky Deutschland on 15 September 2015.

==== Competition around being acquired ====
On 9 December 2016, 21st Century Fox announced that it had made an offer to acquire the remainder of Sky plc for £11.7 billion at a value of £10.75 per-share. It marked Fox's second attempt to take over Sky, as its previous attempt under News Corporation was affected by the News International scandal. The two companies reached an agreement on the deal on 15 December, subject to regulatory approval.

Ofcom expressed concern that this purchase would give the Murdoch family "material influence over news providers with a significant presence across all key platforms" and "increased influence over the UK news agenda and the political process". However, the regulator did deem that a Fox-owned Sky would be "fit and proper" to hold broadcast licences, despite the recent sexual harassment controversies that had emerged at the US Fox News Channel, as there was no evidence to the contrary. Avaaz opposed Ofcom's opinion, stating that the regulator "made mistake after mistake in deciding to give the Murdochs a clean bill of health to take over more of our media".

The Walt Disney Company announced on 14 December 2017 that it would acquire 21st Century Fox, including its stake in Sky plc but barring specific US assets. Fox stated that this purchase would "not alter [its] full commitment and obligation to conclude our proposed transaction". Analysts suggested that Disney's proposed transaction could ease regulatory concerns over Fox's purchase of Sky, as the company will eventually lose its ties to the Murdoch family. Disney has a narrower scope of media ownership in the country than the Murdoch family. Sky already has a relationship with Disney for its Sky Cinema service, holding pay television rights to its films in the United Kingdom and operating a dedicated Sky Cinema channel devoted to Disney content.

A preliminary report by the Competition and Markets Authority issued January 2018 called for the insulation or outright divestment of Sky News as a condition of the purchase, so that it is editorially independent from the Murdoch family. Sky had threatened to reevaluate the channel's continued operations if they "unduly impeded merger and/or other corporate opportunities available in relation to Sky's broader business". The channel has operated on a loss of at least £40 million per-year. In February 2018, Fox proposed the establishment of an independent editorial board, and committing to fund the network for at least 10 years. This commitment would be inherited by Disney after the completion of its purchase of 21st Century Fox. On 3 April 2018, Fox stated that Disney had "expressed an interest in acquiring Sky News", which would not be conditional on its proposal to acquire 21st Century Fox.

A bidding war began 25 April 2018, when the competing US media and telecoms conglomerate Comcast (owner of NBCUniversal), announced a counter-offer for Sky at £12.50 per-share, or approximately £22.1 billion. NBCUniversal CEO Steve Burke stated that purchasing Sky would roughly double its presence in English-speaking markets, and allow for synergies between the respective networks and studios of NBCUniversal and Sky.

On 5 June 2018, Culture Secretary Matt Hancock cleared both 21st Century Fox and Comcast's respective offers to acquire Sky plc. Fox's offer was contingent on the divestiture of Sky News. On 12 June 2018, Comcast announced a US$65 billion counter-offer to acquire the 21st Century Fox assets that Disney had offered to purchase. However, Fox subsequently agreed to an increased, US$71.3 billion offer from Disney instead. On 15 June 2018, the European Commission gave antitrust clearance to Comcast's offer to purchase Sky, citing that in terms of their current assets in Europe, there would be limited impact on competition. Comcast included a 10-year commitment to the operations and funding of Sky News similar to that of Disney's offer. On 19 June 2018, Disney formally agreed to acquire Sky News as part of Fox's proposed bid, with a 15-year commitment to increase its annual funding from £90 million to £100 million.

On 11 July 2018, Fox increased its bid for Sky to £14.00 per share, valuing it at £24.5 billion. Comcast subsequently counterbid just hours later with an offer at £14.75 per-share, valued at £26 billion. On 19 July 2018, after Fox agreed to a Disney counter-offer, it was reported that Comcast had abandoned its bid for 21st Century Fox to focus solely on Sky.

On 20 September 2018, the Panel on Takeovers and Mergers ordered that a blind auction be held "in order to provide an orderly framework for the resolution of this competitive situation". In this process, Fox, followed by Comcast, made new cash-only bids for Sky. After these first two rounds of bidding, there would be a third round where both companies could make new offers. However, the third round of bidding would only be binding if both companies make a bid. The results were to be revealed on 22 September, and be confirmed by the start of trading on 24 September. Comcast won the auction with a bid of £17.28 per-share, beating Fox's bid of £15.67. Sky plc had until 11 October to formally accept this offer.

Following its auction victory, Comcast began to acquire Sky shares from the open market. On 26 September 2018, Fox subsequently announced its intent to sell all of its shares in Sky plc to Comcast for £12 billion. On 4 October 2018, Fox completed the sale of their shares, giving Comcast a 76.8% controlling stake at the time.

=== Sky Group Ltd ===
On 12 October 2018, Comcast announced it would compulsorily acquire the rest of Sky after its bid gained acceptances from 95.3% of the broadcaster's shareholders with the company being delisted by 31 December 2018. Sky was delisted on 7 November 2018 after Comcast acquired all remaining shares.

In August 2021, Sky Group signed a deal with ViacomCBS to launch Paramount+ in the United Kingdom, Ireland, Italy, Germany, Switzerland and Austria by 2022. On 3 May 2022, it was announced that Paramount+ will launch on 22 June 2022 for Sky customers in Ireland and the United Kingdom.

In June 2025, Sky Group announced their intention to sell its German media broadcasting division Sky Deutschland including its channels and broadcasting rights across Germany, Austria and Switzerland as well as the German streaming service WOW to RTL Group. The purchase price would consist of an initial €150 million in cash and a variable consideration linked to RTL Group's share price performance. In April 2026, the European Commission cleared the sale without imposing any conditions. The transaction closed on June 1, 2026.

In November 2025, it was confirmed by ITV plc that it and Sky Group had entered into discussions to purchase the company's media and entertainment assets (which include the television channels and ITVX, but not ITV Studios) for £1.6 billion.

On 29 June 2026, Comcast announced plans to spin off its media businesses, including both Sky and NBCUniversal, as a separate company, with the remainder of Comcast focusing exclusively on its U.S. telecommunications business.

== Management ==
- Executive Chairman: Jeremy Darroch (since January 2021)
- Chief Executive: Dana Strong (since January 2021)

=== List of former chairmen ===
1. Rupert Murdoch (1990–2007)
2. James Murdoch (2007–2012)
3. Nicholas Ferguson (2012–2016)
4. James Murdoch (2016–2018); second term

=== List of former chief executives ===
1. Sam Chisholm (1990–1997)
2. Mark Booth (1997–1999)
3. Tony Ball (1999–2003)
4. James Murdoch (2003–2007)
5. Jeremy Darroch (2007–2021)

The first CEO of BSkyB was Sam Chisholm, who was CEO of Sky TV before the merger. Chisholm served in this position until 1997. He was followed by Mark Booth who was credited with leading the company through the introduction of Sky. Tony Ball was appointed in 1999 and completed the company's analogue to digital conversion. He is also credited with returning the company to profit and bringing subscriber numbers to new heights. In 2003, Ball announced his resignation and James Murdoch, son of Rupert Murdoch was announced as his successor. This appointment caused allegations of nepotism from shareholders.

On 7 December 2007, it was announced that Rupert Murdoch would be stepping down as BSkyB's non-executive chairman and would be replaced by his son, James. In turn, James stepped down as CEO of BSkyB, to be replaced by Jeremy Darroch. It was estimated that Darroch would earn around £38.2 million from selling Sky to Comcast. He sold his 775,772 shares in Sky worth £13.4 million and would cash in on previously awarded bonus shares.

In January 2021, it was announced that Darroch would be standing down as CEO, and will become executive chairman of Sky for the remainder of 2021, and will then be an advisor to the company. He was succeeded as CEO by Dana Strong in January 2021.

The current company directors are Comcast personnel: Michael J Cavanagh (Comcast senior VP & CFO), Arthur R Block (legal counsel) and David L Cohen (senior VP & CDO).

== Financial performance ==
Financial results have been as shown in the table.

Revenue and profit or loss, by fiscal year
Year ended	Revenue (£m)	Profit/(loss) before tax (£m)	Net profit/ (loss)(£m)
30 June 2020	18,600	unknown	unknown
30 June 2018	13,585	864	815
30 June 2017	12,916	803	691
30 June 2016	11,965	752	663
30 June 2015	9,989	1,516	1,952
30 June 2014	7,632	1,082	865
30 June 2013	7,235	1,257	979
30 June 2012	6,791	1,189	906
30 June 2011	6,597	1,014	810
30 June 2010	5,709	1,173	878
30 June 2009	5,359	456	259
30 June 2008	4,952	60	(127)
30 June 2007	4,551	815	499
30 June 2006	4,148	798	551
30 June 2005	4,048	631	425
30 June 2004	3,656	480	322
30 June 2003	3,186	128	190
30 June 2002	2,776	(1,276)	(1,383)
30 June 2001	2,306	(515)	(539)
30 June 2000	1,847	(263)	(272)
30 June 1999	1,545	(389)	(285)
30 June 1998	1,434	271	249
30 June 1997	1,270	314	288
30 June 1996	1,008	257	–
30 June 1995	778	155	–
30 June 1994	550	93	–
30 June 1993	380	(76)	–
30 June 1992	233	(188)	–
30 June 1991	93	(759)	–

In February 2019, The Economist magazine claimed that Sky enjoys gross margins of 50%.

== Current operations ==
=== Subsidiaries ===
Subsidiary companies of Sky Group
Name	Details
Sky UK Limited	The original Sky Television, now a holding company for Sky's United Kingdom operations.
Sky Subscriber Services Limited	Operating company for the Sky pay-television service.
Sky In-Home Services Limited	Home installations of satellite dishes and set-top boxes.
Sky Broadband Limited and Sky Home Communications Limited	Operating companies for Sky's broadband and telephony services, including Be Un Limited which was acquired from O2.
Sky Ireland Limited	Operating company for Sky pay-television service in Ireland.
Sky Italia S.r.l.	Operating company for Sky pay-television, broadband and telephony services in Italy.
Sky Studios	In June 2019, Sky formed Sky Studios with the production assets from Sky Vision. Excluding distribution which was transferred to sister company NBCUniversal.
Amstrad	British electronics company acquired by BSkyB.
Now	An internet broadcast company owned by Sky.
Freesat from Sky	A free satellite television service similar to Freesat and Freeview. Service withdrawn in 2021.
The Cloud	Free Public Wi-Fi hotspot provider acquired by BSkyB.

=== Ventures ===
Current venture operations of Sky Group
Venture	Share	Partner	General information
A&E Networks UK	50%	A&E Networks	Operates Blaze, History, H2 and CI channels
Sky Sports Racing	50%	Arena Racing Company	
Ginx TV Ltd	50%	ITV plc	
Jupiter Entertainment	60%		
Skybound Stories	50%	Skybound Entertainment	
Comedy Central (British TV channel)	25%	Skydance UK Partnership, part of Skydance	
DTV Services Ltd	20%	Arqiva, BBC, Channel 4, ITV plc	Manages and markets the Freeview brand
SkyShowtime	50%	Skydance (through Showtime Networks)	

== Former operations ==
=== Subsidiaries ===
Former subsidiary companies of Sky Group
Name	Details
Sky España	An over-the-top video streaming service in Spain. On 1 September 2020, Sky España ceased its own operations.
Acetrax	A video on demand movie rental service. Now closed down.
Sky Deutschland	Operating company for Sky pay-television service in Germany, Austria and Sky Switzerland Sold to RTL Group
Sky México	(41.3%) – with Liberty Media and Grupo Televisa; Operating company for Sky pay-television service in Mexico. Sold their stake to DirecTV
Sky Brasil	(80%) – with Liberty Media and Grupo Globo; Operating company for Sky pay-television service in Brazil. Sold their stake to DirecTV
Sky Vision	Unit for distributing TV shows globally and investment in production assets. Assets split between Sky Studios and Universal Television Distribution following Comcast's takeover of Sky
Japan Sky Broadcasting	(JSkyB) – with SoftBank Corp. Operating company for Sky pay-television service in Japan. Sold to DirecTV and later absorbed into SKY PerfecTV!

Former venture operations of Sky Group
Venture	Share	Partner	General information
Australian News Channel	33.3%	Seven Network and Nine Entertainment and operated Sky News Australia	Sold to News Corp Australia
Bad Wolf	minority	HBO, BBC Studios	Sold to Sony Pictures Television
Beamly	10%		Sold to Coty
Nickelodeon UK	40%	Paramount Networks UK & Australia, part of Paramount Global	Sold to Paramount Skydance, now known as Skydance
