= Rich, Famous and in the Slums =

- Genre: Factual
- Country of origin: United Kingdom
- Original language: English
- No. of series: 1
- No. of episodes: 2

Production
- Executive producers: Richard McKerrow; Elliot Reed
- Production locations: Kibera, Nairobi, Kenya
- Running time: 60 minutes
- Production company: Love Productions

Original release
- Network: BBC One
- Release: 3 March – 10 March 2011

Related
- Famous, Rich and Hungry

Rich, Famous and in the Slums is a TV programme broadcast by the BBC on 3 and 10 March 2011 for Comic Relief.

== Plot ==
Four famous personalities, Lenny Henry, Reggie Yates, Samantha Womack and Angela Rippon, were sent by the BBC to live for several weeks in the slums of Kibera. They had to leave all their belongings behind with the two people who were running the experience.

Firstly, they had to live in squalor on their own. They were given £2 to start off with to buy the necessities like a toothbrush but they had to earn all the other money they needed. Then, after a week living on their own, they went to live with residents of Kibera. Lenny Henry went to live with a family of orphans, the oldest being a boy called Bernard. Reggie Yates goes to a wannabe hip hop artists who records his music on his friend's computer but doesn't have any money to record the lyrics.

Samantha Womack goes to live with a prostitute. She has had to send her children away to live with her grandma so she can earn money. Her family have no idea she is a prostitute and think she is a receptionist in Nairobi and Angela Rippon goes to live with a lady who owns a hair salon and is HIV positive.

In the end, Lenny feels so sad for the orphans who are literally living with a drainpipe of filthy water running behind them while they are doing their homework that he buys them a house, Reggie takes the hip hop artist to the local radio station, Samantha takes the lady who is forced to work as a prostitute to see her children and Angela helps the HIV positive lady advertise her salon, so that she can pay her child's school fees.

== See also ==
- Comic Relief 2011
- Famous, Rich and Hungry
