= Sky Studios =

British production and distribution company

- Type: Subsidiary
- Predecessor: Sky Vision
- Founded: June 2019; 7 years ago
- Headquarters: Grant Way, Osterley, England
- Area served: Worldwide
- Key people: Cécile Frot-Coutaz (CEO)
- Parent: Sky Group
- Subsidiaries: Blast! Films; Jupiter Entertainment; Longboat Pictures; Love Productions; Talos Films; The Lighthouse; Transistor Films; True North Productions; True to Nature; Znak & Co.
- Website: www.skygroup.sky/skystudios

Sky Studios is a production company founded by Sky in June 2019 with assets from the now defunct Sky Vision. It develops, produces and funds original drama, comedy and documentary, and has investments in a number of production businesses in the UK and US: Love Productions (wholly owned), Blast Films!, Sugar Films, True North Productions, Chrysalis Vision, True to Nature, Longboat Pictures and The Lighthouse in the United Kingdom; Jupiter Entertainment, Talos Films, Znak & Co. and Catalina Content in the United States.

As part of the launch of Sky Studios, the broadcaster also announced that they would double their spend on original productions to over $1.3 billion over the next five years.

In September 2019, Sky Studios announced they were launching a US-arm called The Hive, based in New York and Tennessee, utilising expertise from Jupiter Entertainment. In December 2021, Sky Studios sold their minority stake in Bad Wolf to Sony Pictures Television.

== Sky Studios Elstree ==
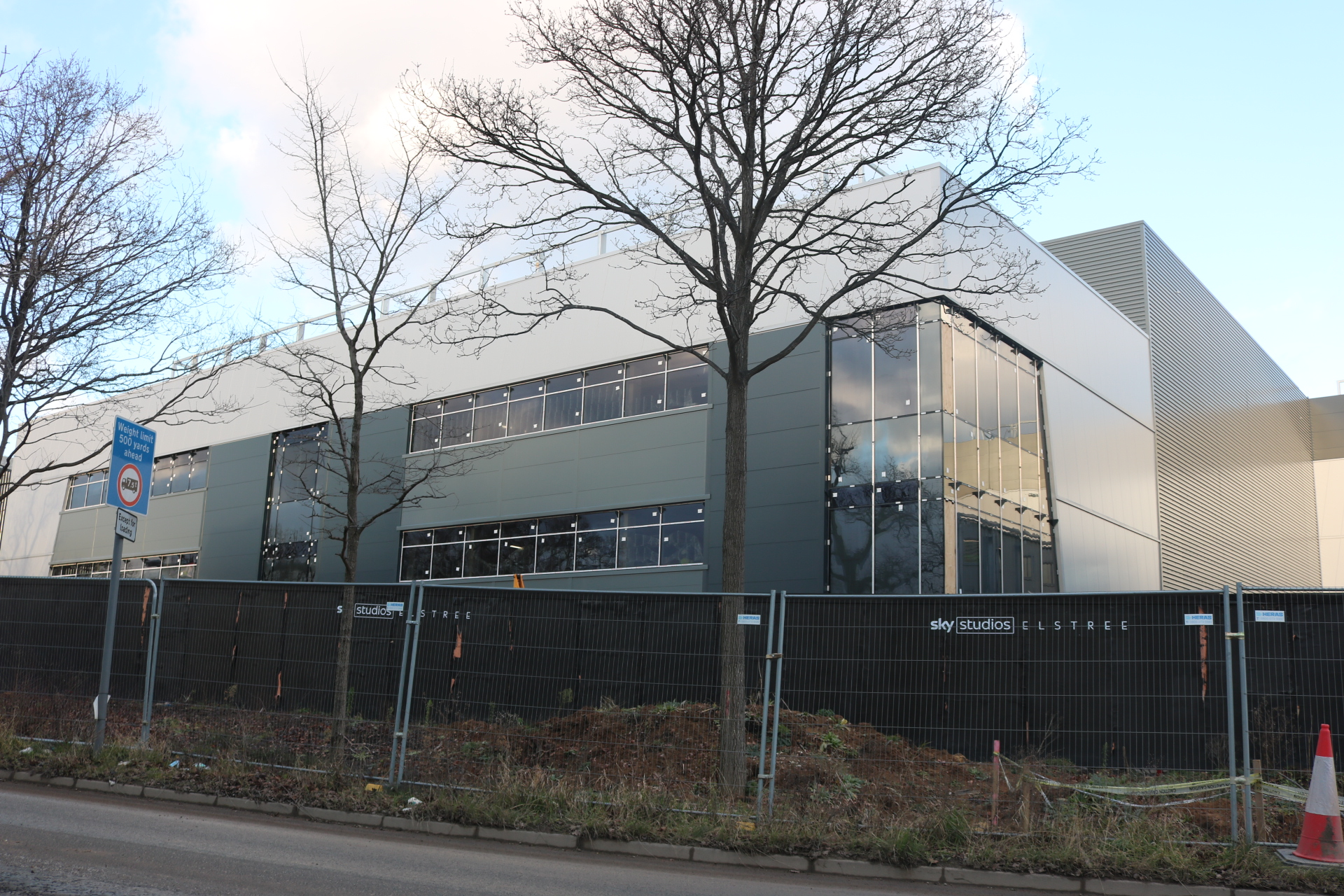
Exterior of a Sky Studios Elstree building

In December 2019, Sky announced plans to develop Sky Studios Elstree. The facility was constructed at Rowley Lane, Borehamwood, located close to the existing Elstree Studios. The final sound stage was opened by the Duke of Edinburgh in March 2023.The completion of the whole project was celebrated with Pop Up Cinema screenings for local residents in October 2023. The studio provides production space for Sky's original content as well as film and TV productions from NBCUniversal, which is owned by Sky's parent company Comcast.

The facility has 13 stages ranging from 10,000 sq ft to 30,000 sq ft. The site also houses post-production facilities and an on-site screening cinema.

=== Filmography ===
- Paddington in Peru (2024)
- Wicked (2024)
- Bridget Jones: Mad About the Boy (2025)
- Jurassic World Rebirth (2025)
- Wicked: For Good (2025)
- Wuthering Heights (2026)
- Masters of the Universe (2026)
- Werwulf (2026)
- How to Train Your Dragon 2 (2027)
- The Mummy: Book of the Dead (2027)
- Elden Ring (2028)

== Partnerships ==
Sky Studios has creative partnerships in place with a range of production companies including Merman TV (founded by Sharon Horgan and Clelia Mountford), Rangabee (founded by Romesh Ranganathan and Benjamin Green), The Apartment (part of Fremantle and led by Lorenzo Mieli) and an overall deal with German filmmaker Philipp Leinemann.

== Original productions ==
Scripted series
Year	Title	Original network(s)	Notes	Refs.
2020	The New Pope	Sky Atlantic (Italy), HBO, Canal+	with The Apartment, Wildside, Haut et Court TV, Mediapro, Sky Italia	
2020	ZeroZeroZero	Sky Atlantic (Italy), Canal+, Amazon Prime Video	with Cattleya, Bartleby Film, Sky Italia	
2020	Gangs of London	Sky Atlantic (UK), Cinemax/AMC	with Pulse Films, Sister, Sky UK	
2020	Devils	Sky Atlantic (Italy), OCS	with Lux Vide, Sky Italia, Orange Studio	
2020	Das Boot (seasons 2–4)	Sky One (Germany)	with Bavaria Film, Sky Deutschland	
2020	I Hate Suzie	Sky Atlantic (UK)	with Bad Wolf, Sky UK	
2020	Two Weeks to Live	Sky One (UK)	with Kudos, Sky UK	
2020	Petra	Sky Atlantic (Italy) (season 1), Sky Serie (Italy) (season 2)	with Cattleya, Bartleby Film, Sky Italia	
2020	The Third Day	HBO, Sky Atlantic (UK)	with Plan B Entertainment, Punchdrunk International, Sky UK	
2020	We Are Who We Are	HBO, Sky Atlantic (Italy)	with The Apartment, Wildside, Small Forward, Sky Italia	
2020	Romulus	Sky Atlantic (Italy)	with Cattleya, Groenlandia, Sky Italia	
2020	Hausen	Sky One (Germany)	with Lago Film, Sky Deutschland	
2021	A Discovery of Witches (seasons 2–3)	Sky One (UK) (seasons 1–2), Sky Max (UK) (season 3)	with Bad Wolf, Sky UK	
2021	Bloods	Sky Comedy	with Roughcut TV, Sky UK	
2021	Speravo de morì prima	Sky Atlantic (Italy)	with Wildside, Capri Entertainment, Fremantle, The New Life Company, Sky Italia	
2021	Anna	Sky Atlantic (Italy)	with Wildside, Arte France, The New Life Company, Sky Italia	
2021	Intergalactic	Sky One (UK)	with Moonage Pictures, Motion Content Group, Tiger Aspect, Sky UK	
2021	Domina	Sky Atlantic (Italy), Sky Atlantic (UK), MGM+	with Fifty Fathoms, Cattleya, Sky Italia	
2021	Ich und die Anderen	Sky One (Germany)	with Superfilm Filmproduktions GmbH, Sky Deutschland	
2021	Britannia (season 3)	Sky Atlantic (UK)	with Vertigo Films, Neal Street Productions, Sky UK	
2021	Brassic (season 3–)	Sky Max (UK)	with Calamity Films, Sky UK	
2021	The Ibiza Affair	Sky Atlantic (Germany)	with W&B Television, Sky Deutschland	
2021	Temple (season 2)	Sky Max (UK)	with Hera Pictures, Sky UK	
2021	Gomorrah (season 5)	Sky Atlantic (Italy)	with Cattleya, Sky Italia	
2021	Landscapers	HBO, Sky Atlantic (UK)	with Sister, South of the River Pictures, Sky UK	
2021	A casa tutti bene - La serie	Sky Serie (Italy)	with Lotus Production, Sky Italia	
2022	Christian	Sky Atlantic (Italy)	with Lucky Red, Newen Connect, Sky Italia	
2022	The Fear Index	Sky Atlantic (UK)	with Left Bank Pictures, Sky UK	
2022	The Rising	Sky Max (UK)	with Sky UK	
2022	Funeral for a Dog a.k.a. Paradiso	Sky One (Germany)	with Flare Entertainment, Sky Deutschland	
2022	Il re	Sky Atlantic (Italy)	with The Apartment, Wildside, Zocotoco, Sky Italia	
2022	The Baby	HBO, Sky Atlantic (UK)	with Sister, Proverbial Pictures, Sky UK	
2022	Blocco 181	Sky Atlantic (Italy)	with Red Joint Film, TapelessFilm, Sky Italia	
2022	The Midwich Cuckoos	Sky Max (UK)	with Snowed-In Productions, DayOut Productions, Route 24, Sky UK	
2022	The Lazarus Project	Sky Max (UK)	with Urban Myth Films, Sky UK	
2025	The Art of Joy	Sky Atlantic (Italy)	with HT Film	
2026	Gomorrah: The Origins	Sky Atlantic (Italy)	with Cattleya, BETA, Sky Italia	

Unscripted series
Year	Title	Original network(s)	Notes	Refs.
2021	Murder at the Cottage: The Search for Justice for Sophie	Sky Crime (UK)	with Hell's Kitchen, Dare Films, Sky UK	
2021	Shark with Steve Backshall	Sky Nature (UK)	with True to Nature, Sky UK	

Unscripted films
Year	Title	Original network(s)	Notes	Refs.
2021	Steve McQueen: The Lost Movie	Sky Documentaries (UK)	with Associated Rediffusion Productions, Sky UK	
2021	Bruno v Tyson	Sky Documentaries (UK)	with Workerbee, Sky UK	
2021	Hawking: Can You Hear Me?	Sky Documentaries (UK)	with Atlantic Productions, Sky UK	

=== Upcoming ===
Scripted series

- Impero (TBC) – for Sky Italia – with Èliseo Entertainment, Sky Italia

Unscripted series

- Greenpeace Inside - Mission: Saving the Planet (2022) - for Sky Documentaries (UK) – with M.E. Works, Constantin Dokumentation, Sky UK

Unscripted films
