= Your Song (British TV series) =

British music competition television series

- Promotional poster
- Genre: Music competition
- Directed by: Marcus Viner
- Presented by: Alison Hammond
- Judges: Paloma Faith; Sam Ryder
- Country of origin: United Kingdom
- Original language: English
- No. of series: 1
- No. of episodes: 6

Production
- Executive producers: Martha Delap; Kieran Smith
- Running time: 60 minutes (inc. adverts)
- Production company: Love Productions

Original release
- Network: Channel 4
- Release: 12 April – 17 May 2026

Related
- The Piano

Your Song is a televised British music competition show that aired on Channel 4 from 12 April to 17 May 2026. It is hosted by Alison Hammond with Paloma Faith and Sam Ryder serving as judges. The series follows amateur singers getting the opportunity to sing at Hackney Empire. Your Song received mixed reviews from critics.

== Format ==
Amateur singers are invited to sing a song that holds deep personal meaning to them and "tells their story". The singers perform on a pop-up stage accompanied by a live house band. Unbeknownst to the performers, Faith and Ryder secretly watch the performances from a nearby hotel. The judges then select the best performers to perform at a "once in a lifetime concert" at Hackney Empire.

== Episodes ==
Series	Episodes	Originally released			Winner
Series	Episodes	First released	Last released	Network	Winner
1	6	12 April 2026	17 May 2026	Channel 4	Chantelle

=== Series 1 (2026) ===
No. overall	No. in series	Location	Original release date
1	1	Liverpool	12 April 2026
2	2	Edinburgh	19 April 2026
3	3	London	26 April 2026
4	4	Birmingham	3 May 2026
5	5	"The Road to the Final Concert"	10 May 2026
6	6	Hackney Empire	17 May 2026

== Production ==
Your Song is produced by Love Productions, who also make The Piano, a series with a similar format. The series is distributed internationally by ITV Studios. Filming began in Edinburgh at the Mound in September 2025, where presenter Alison Hammond performed an "impressive" version of "Mustang Sally".

== Reception ==
The series received mixed reviews from critics. Sarah Dempster of The Guardian awarded two out of five stars, branding Your Song as a "nightmarish karaoke show". Anita Singh of The Telegraph also awarded two stars, deeming it inferior to The Piano.
