= Tower Block of Commons =

- Genre: Documentary
- Directed by: Joanna Burge
- Narrated by: Mark Bazeley
- Country of origin: United Kingdom
- Original language: English
- No. of series: 1
- No. of episodes: 4

Production
- Production location: United Kingdom
- Running time: 60 minutes
- Production company: Love Productions

Original release
- Network: Channel 4
- Release: 1 February – 22 February 2010

Tower Block of Commons is a British four-episode reality documentary show produced by Love Productions and broadcast on Channel 4 in 2010 where four Members of Parliament (MPs) have to spend time living in a variety of deprived housing estates around Britain. The four MPs who participated were Austin Mitchell (Labour), Mark Oaten (Liberal Democrat), Tim Loughton and Nadine Dorries (both Conservative). In the first episode, Iain Duncan Smith appears but Dorries appears in his place for the remainder of the three episodes. Duncan Smith's exit from the show followed his wife being diagnosed with cancer.

== Overview ==
During the series, Mark Oaten lives in Goresbrook Village estate in Barking, Tim Loughton spends time in the Newton estate in Birmingham, Austin Mitchell and his wife visit the Orchard Park estate in Hull, and Iain Duncan Smith visits the Carpenters estate in Stratford.

In the second episode, having replaced Iain Duncan Smith, Nadine Dorries moves into the South Acton estate in west London.

Upon Oaten entering the estate, he is confronted with homophobic abuse from youths.

After the show was recorded, Loughton said of the experience:

What struck me most of all was the feeling of powerlessness amongst people on the streets, and the information vacuum that made it difficult to pursue any sort of community cohesion.

Oaten expressed similar concerns:

What I found difficult to cope with was the depressingness, the miserable side of living in a tower block. That's what got me down. But I didn't encounter hostility. Bemusement about us, yes. And I didn't feel threatened, but personally I found it difficult at times, and there were a couple of occasions when I wanted to jack it in.

Austin Mitchell said after the programme aired that he regretted participating: "I should have turned them down". He said that the production company produced a programme that was a "cynical distraction" from the premise he was initially approached about, which was more specifically to show the plight of council house residents. A spokesman for Love Productions responded to Mitchell's comments: "We certainly did not set out to humiliate the MPs taking part and we don't believe the end result does so."

Nadine Dorries was later reported to have cheated by keeping a £50 note in her bra. She said that she would use the money to buy gifts for the children of her single mother hosts.

== Reception ==
Grace Dent wrote in The Guardian that the show "is absorbing and maddening in equal portions. Part MP rehabilitation show, part class war porn for angry, uppity sorts such as myself". She was particularly biting towards Austin Mitchell's wife Linda: "she gives herself enough rope to hang herself almost every half hour".

Nancy Banks-Smith, also writing in The Guardian, said the programme was "a tribute to the backbone of the residents, and a jolly good joke at MPs' expense".

In The Independent, Robert Epstein praised Tim Loughton and Mark Oaten's performance, noting that "get on with the job, actually learning something from their hosts; Oaten even goes so far as to get a petition going to have the mould-ravaged tower block knocked down. But it's clear that neither is entirely comfortable in their new homes".

Kevin Maguire wrote in the Daily Mirror that the programme showed "snobbery" on the part of the Channel 4 executives who approved the show and described the participating politicians as "publicity-seeking" and "fools". He poured particular scorn on Oaten, saying his participation is no surprise: "the MP for Rent Boy Central treats TV as therapy".

Nathan Bevan in Wales on Sunday said that watching Tim Loughton "doing his best "dad dancing" while trying to boogie to General Levy down the dancehall with the puffa-jacketed B19 posse was a hoot", but that Austin Mitchell's refusal to participate fully showed that he "seemed to exhibit only the faintest of grasps on reality".

== Allegation of using actors ==
In May 2022 Nadine Dorries, by this time Secretary of State for Digital, Culture, Media and Sport alleged that some of the people who had appeared alongside her were actors. This allegation was perceived as being particularly serious as Dorries's Department was due to make a decision on whether to privatise Channel 4. Reviews by Channel 4 and the production company found no evidence to substantiate the allegations. The Digital, Culture, Media and Sport Committee of MPs investigated the matter and concluded that the claims by Dorries were groundless.
