= The Piano (TV series) =

British talent show competition

- Genre: Music competition
- Created by: Richard McKerrow
- Presented by: Claudia Winkleman
- Judges: Lang Lang; Mika; Jon Batiste
- Country of origin: United Kingdom
- Original language: English
- No. of series: 4
- No. of episodes: 26

Production
- Running time: 60 minutes (inc. adverts)
- Production company: Love Productions

Original release
- Network: Channel 4
- Release: 15 February 2023 – present

Related
- The Great British Sewing Bee; The Great Pottery Throw Down; Your Song

The Piano is a televised British music competition show that has aired on Channel 4 since 15 February 2023. It is hosted by Claudia Winkleman with Lang Lang and Mika as judges in the first two series. In the third series Lang was replaced by Jon Batiste. The fourth series has a different guest judge joining Mika for each episode.

In July 2023 the programme was recommissioned for a second and third series, a Christmas special and a documentary on the first series winner Lucy Illingworth.

== Format ==
Amateur musicians are invited to publicly perform on street pianos in the concourses of major UK railway stations. Performed pieces include classical standards, contemporary chart hits, and original compositions, with some performers accompanying themselves with vocals.

Each series ends with a final concert at the Royal Festival Hall (series 1 and 2) series 3 at the Sage Gateshead. or Birmingham Symphony Hall (series 4).

The judges observe the performances from a nearby room, selecting one performer from each location to perform at the end-of-series concert. For the first series the competitive element was kept secret from the performers.

== Series overview ==
| Series | Episodes | Premiere | Finale | Winner |
|---|---|---|---|---|
| 1 | 5 | 15 February 2023 | 15 March 2023 | Lucy Illingworth |
| 2 | 7 | 28 April 2024 | 9 June 2024 | Brad Kella |
| 3 | 7 | 13 April 2025 | 25 May 2025 | Diana Newall |
| 4 | 7 | 12 July 2026 | 23 August 2026 | Grace Matthews |

=== Series 1 (2023) ===
The first series aired from 15 February to 15 March 2023 and ran for five episodes. The heats were held at London St Pancras, Leeds, Glasgow Central and Birmingham New Street with the final being held at the Royal Festival Hall. The series winner was Lucy Illingworth, a young blind girl who is also autistic and non-verbal. Illingworth went on to perform at the Coronation Concert and a commemoration of Fanny Waterman.

=== Series 2 (2024) ===
The second series aired from 28 April to 9 June 2024. The heats took place at Manchester Piccadilly, Cardiff Central, Edinburgh Waverley, London Victoria and Liverpool Lime Street. The series was won by Brad Kella.

=== Series 3 (2025) ===
The third series aired from 13 April to 25 May 2025, and was won by Diana Newall.

=== Series 4 (2026) ===
The fourth series began airing on 12 July 2026. Mika remains as a judge, joined in each episode by a guest. Those acting as guest judges and mentors are:

- Tiffany Poon
- Jamie Cullum
- Hiromi
- Jules Holland
- Alice Sara Ott
- Jon Batiste

The filming location for the second episode was moved from Glasgow Central Station to Liverpool Street in London due to a major fire in neighbouring buildings.

== Reception ==
The Guardian awarded the first episode four stars out of five, asking if it could be considered "Bake Off for pianos". The Mirror considered the show to be "brilliantly simple" and life-affirming. In contrast, The i Paper considered the show to be "aimless fluff".

== International versions ==
Fremantle holds international format rights. They have sold it to broadcasters in Australia, Denmark, Germany, Netherlands and Spain.

| Region/country | Local title | Network | Winners | Judges | Presenter(s) |
|---|---|---|---|---|---|
| Australia | The Piano | ABC TV | Series 1: 2025 | Harry Connick Jr. Andrea Lam | Amanda Keller |
| Australia | The Piano | ABC TV | Series 2: 2026 | Guy Sebastian; Andrea Lam | Amanda Keller |
| Denmark | Klaveret | TV2 | Series 1: 2024 | Mads Langer; Tanja Zapolski | Sarah Grünewald |
| Germany | The Piano | VOX | Series 1: 2024 | Mark Forster; Igor Levit | Annika Lau |
| Netherlands | De Piano | RTL 4 | Series 1: 2024 | Roel van Velzen; Dominic Seldis; Daria van den Bercken | Chantal Janzen |
| Spain | El Piano | LaSexta | Series 1: 2024–2025 | Pablo López; Mika | Ruth Lorenzo |
