= JSkyB =

Japanese satellite television operator

Japan Sky Broadcasting, better known as JSkyB (JスカイB), was a Japanese satellite television operator created in 1996 by BSkyB and the Softbank Group. Before the start of operations, it was agreed on April 25, 1998, that JSkyB would merge with PerfecTV! on May 1, creating the SKY PerfecTV! service. After the merger, its headquarters in Aomi were used by SKY PerfecTV! as a transmitting center.

== History ==
In June 1996, Rupert Murdoch, owner of the Sky service in the UK, announced his plans to launch a Sky-branded service in Japan, coinciding with the deregulation of the telecommunications market. The new service would start by June 1998 and would offer a 100-channel service, with most of the content being local. On June 20, he announced his strategic partner, Softbank Group, led by Masayoshi Son. In addition to the planned launch of the service, the two also planned a takeover of a stake in TV Asahi. On September 4, JSkyB announced that it would use the JCSAT-4 satellite. Sky Entertainment Co., Ltd. was established the following day.

The company was registered on December 17, 1996, with Murdoch and Masayoshi owning 50% each of the shares, with Murdoch as chairman and Masayoshi as president. The service would be launched in two phases: a limited 12-channel service in fall 1997, followed by the full service in 1998. Murdoch stressed the importance of the Japanese market at the time based on two factors: large population and disposable income.

Sony announced its intent to become a shareholder in January 1997. In March, the two parties behind the service announced the sale of their TV Asahi share to the Asahi Shimbun publishing company. Fuji Television joined the shareholder structure in May; The Walt Disney Company was also considering joining.

In late August, JSkyB and PerfecTV! announced a tie-up operation where both operators would share the same infrastructure (dishes, receivers and integrated circuit cards).

A merger agreement was finalized on February 3, 1998; the following month, it was announced that the merged company would be operational effective May 1. The decision was taken to avoid excessive competition in the satellite market. The Ministry of Posts and Telecommunications approved the JSkyB channels on April 25, days before the merger came.
