= The Cloud (company) =

Provider of public access Wi-Fi hotspots in the United Kingdom

- Type: Division
- Industry: Public access Wi-Fi
- Founded: January 2003; 23 years ago
- Headquarters: St Albans, Hertfordshire, United Kingdom
- Number of locations: 22,000
- Area served: United Kingdom
- Key people: Vince Russell (managing director)
- Number of employees: 100
- Parent: Sky UK
- Website: thecloud.net

The Cloud is a provider of public access Wi-Fi hotspots in the United Kingdom and is a member of the Wireless Broadband Alliance. It has over 22,000 Wi-Fi hotspots network access points in the UK.

The Cloud has offices in St Albans, Munich, and Stockholm. The company is owned by the Comcast group through its subsidiary Sky Group.

== History ==
The Cloud was founded in January 2003, and began roll-out in March of that year. BT Openzone was the first service provider on the network. The Cloud launched its integrated WLAN and 3G service in 2004. It became available in Germany and the Nordic nations in 2005. Later that year, it acquired Exilan. The Cloud Networks was selected as one of the World Economic Forum's New Class of Technology Pioneers for 2006. Telenor partnered with the Cloud Nordic in 2006 to offer free Wi-Fi at public hotspots.

Steve Nicholson became CEO of the company in 2007. Between 2005 and 2008, The Cloud acquired German wifi providers GANAG, Airnyx and CANOVA Wireless. In 2008, the company received €15 million in funding from Ferd Ventures, existing investors and GP Bullhound.

In 2011, it was acquired by BSkyB. Beginning in 2012, Sky began offering free wireless Internet to Sky Broadband customers in the UK via The Cloud The Cloud became the exclusive free hotspot provider for Telefónica Germany later that year. In 2012, Telefónica O2 UK discontinued free access to The Cloud for customers on unlimited wi-fi contracts.
