= Attempted acquisition of BSkyB by News Corporation =

2010–11 British failed takeover

The News Corporation takeover bid for BSkyB was a proposed takeover of British Sky Broadcasting (BSkyB) by News Corporation, the media conglomerate of Rupert Murdoch. The bid was launched in June 2010 but was withdrawn in July 2011 following the News International phone hacking scandal. News Corporation already owned 39.1% of BSkyB and held onto its stake following the collapse of the takeover bid.

In December 2010 regulatory approval was removed from Vince Cable, who had told undercover reporters from The Daily Telegraph he had "declared war" on Murdoch. When these comments were made public, the final decision on the deal went instead to Jeremy Hunt.

In July 2011 the hacking of the phones of non-celebrities by the News of the World, a tabloid newspaper published by News International, was reported. Details of the hacking, especially into the voicemail of murder victim Milly Dowler, caused widespread outrage against News Corporation. Attempts to defuse the scandal by closing the News of the World and publishing an apology by Murdoch both failed. In the face of a planned motion in the House of Commons calling on News Corporation to abandon the bid, they withdrew the bid.

== Offer ==
The takeover was an essential part of News Corporation's business strategy, not least as it would have made possible integration with other entities such as Sky Deutschland and Sky Italia. The Guardian wrote that "Without a full takeover of BSkyB, News Corp's global satellite strategy would look an unco-ordinated mess."

On 15 June 2010, BSkyB announced that it had rejected an offer from News Corporation to take full control of the company. News Corp had offered 700p per share for the remaining 60.9% of shares that it did not own. BSkyB said that it would only consider offers of at least 800p per share.

== Regulatory issues ==
Although the two companies had not agreed on a revised takeover proposal, News Corporation announced its intention to seek regulatory approval from the European Commission in November. The Commission unconditionally approved the proposal the following month.

The proposal was also reviewed by the British government. On 4 November 2010 the Business Secretary, Liberal Democrat Vince Cable, referred the takeover bid to Ofcom to consider issues of media plurality. In July 2011 it was reported that around this time News Corp's News International subsidiary had "bullied" the Liberal Democrats. The Observer said that "According to one account from a senior party figure, a cabinet minister was told that, if the government did not do as NI wanted, the Lib Dems would be 'done over' by the Murdoch papers."

In late December 2010, undercover reporters from The Daily Telegraph, posing as constituents, set up a meeting with Cable, in which he made some unguarded remarks about the coalition, including a description of the coalition's attempt at fast, widespread reforms (including the health service and local governments) as being a "kind of Maoist revolution". When his comments appeared in the press on 21 December, Cable stated "Naturally I am embarrassed by these comments and I regret them", before reaffirming his commitment to the coalition government, stating that "I am proud of what it is achieving". In May 2011 the Press Complaints Commission upheld a complaint regarding the Telegraph's use of subterfuge: "On this occasion, the commission was not convinced that the public interest was such as to justify proportionately this level of subterfuge."

In an unpublished part of the Telegraph transcript, Cable stated in reference to Rupert Murdoch's News Corporation takeover bid for BSkyB, "I have declared war on Mr Murdoch and I think we are going to win." This was given to the BBC's Robert Peston by a whistleblower unhappy that the Telegraph had not published Cable's comments in full, and also published on 21 December. Following this revelation Cable had his responsibility for media affairs – including ruling on Murdoch's takeover plans – withdrawn from his role as business secretary the same day. In July 2011 a firm of private investigators hired by the Telegraph to track the source of the leak concluded "strong suspicion" that two former Telegraph employees who had moved to News International, one of them Will Lewis, had gained access to the transcript and audio files and leaked them to Peston.

The proposal was instead referred to Jeremy Hunt, the Conservative Secretary of State for culture, media and sport. Hunt initially elected not to refer to the deal to the Competition Commission, announcing on 3 March 2011 that he intended to accept a series of undertakings given by News Corporation, paving the way for the deal to be approved. The undertakings would have led to Sky News being severed from BSkyB. On 23 June it was reported that News Corp had reached an agreement with Ofcom to approve the takeover, on the basis of Sky News becoming a separate company.

By early July, despite public opposition to the deal, it was reported that the government was ready to give clearance to the deal.

== Bid withdrawn ==
In the wake of the Milly Dowler phone hacking allegations, some politicians began to seriously question whether the takeover of BSkyB by News Corporation ought to be blocked. The Media Standards Trust formed the pressure group Hacked Off, to campaign for a public inquiry. Soon after its launch, the campaign gained the support of the actor Hugh Grant, a suspected hacking victim who became a public spokesperson, appearing on Question Time and Newsnight.

In July 2011, during the News International phone hacking scandal, BSkyB shares fell sharply in value and Hunt received over 150,000 submissions from members of the public; most submissions were opposed to News Corp taking full control of BSkyB. News Corp subsequently withdrew undertakings made as part of negotiations with the government, triggering an immediate referral of the proposal to the Competition Commission.

Numerous analysts and commentators suggested that as a result of the phone hacking scandal, it would be politically difficult or impossible for News Corp to proceed with its takeover plans. In addition to public pressure for the deal to be withdrawn or for the Government to halt the proposal, Britain's major political parties all expressed the view that the deal should not go ahead. The Liberal Democrats and the Conservatives both indicated that they would support an opposition day motion from Labour calling on News Corp to rescind its offer.

On 13 July, shortly before the House of Commons was due to debate the motion, News Corporation announced that it would be withdrawing its proposal to take complete ownership of BSkyB. Chase Carey, the corporation's deputy chairman, stated that it was "too difficult to progress" with the proposed takeover given the phone hacking controversy.

In a symbolic gesture, the House later passed the opposition day motion unanimously by acclamation.

In 2016, 21st Century Fox attempted to purchase Sky plc, but after it found itself in the midst of an acquisition by Disney, Comcast (which was also bidding for 21st Century Fox, but later gave up) acquired all of Sky in 2018, and today, Sky is under Comcast.
