= Tony Ball =

British television executive

Tony Ball is a British television executive, former chairman of Kabel Deutschland and former CEO of BSkyB.

== Biography ==
Born and educated in London, Ball received an MBA from Kingston University and later an honorary doctorate.

=== Career ===
Ball joined Thames Television on graduation as a broadcasting engineer. he was later a founding director of Champion TV, which launched the UK's first dedicated sports channel, The Sports Channel, broadcast on British Satellite Broadcasting. In 1993, Ball joined BSkyB, where he built the success of Sky Sports.

==== Fox Sports International ====
Ball went to Australia to manage Fox Sports Australia and from here moved to the United States to become President of Fox Sports International, where he oversaw the creation and the operation of sports television businesses in North America, Latin America, Asia, and Australia.

==== Fox Liberty Networks ====
Ball then became chief executive of News Corporation's Fox/Liberty Media Network, which included the FX Network, Fox Sports Net and 20 Regional Sports Channels throughout the United States. By creating cable deals Ball was able to significant increase the number ofsubscribers to Fox.

==== BSkyB ====
In 1999, Murdoch picked Ball to revive loss-making BSkyB, returning to the UK to manage the change from analogue to digital transmission. His reputation as an astute and intelligent marketer was solidified, on the back of doubling subscribers to 7million and taking BSkyB into profit for the first time in five years. The results were reflected in his basic salary of £762,000 and a £1.5m bonus; his total earnings during his tenure are estimated at £30m. After resigning in late 2003, he was replaced by James Murdoch, and left News Corp in April 2004.

==== Kabel Deutschland ====
Ball joined Kabel Deutschland as chairman in 2003, where he introduced premium internet, telephony, and television services and executed a €1 billion network upgrade. From February 2006 to September 2010, Kabel Deutschland was majority-owned by Providence Equity Partners. On 24 June 2013, Vodafone announced a takeover bid for Kabel Deutschland valued at €7.7 billion, 4 times the valuation at the time of IPO. The board recommended the bid above that of rival Liberty Global.

==== Post 2003 ====
Ball became a non-executive director for various companies, which presently include: non-executive director of the Spanish cable company ONO; and a non-executive director of BT plc. In mid-2009, Ball started negotiations with ITV to become Chief Executive, but talks broke down in September over various contractual issues.

Ball is a board member of the Olympic Delivery Authority for the London 2012 Summer Olympics, and a trustee of the Media Trust.

=== Personal life ===
His second marriage is to a Spanish-national lady, Gabriella; the couple has homes in London and Spain. The motorcycle he bought and rode whilst resident in California was placed in his office at BSkyB.
