= Wendy Darke =

British television producer and marine biologist

Wendy Darke is a British television producer and marine biologist, and the former head of the Natural History Unit (NHU) at the BBC. She was the first woman to head the division in its then-56 year history.

== Early life ==
She was born in Gloucester. She grew up in Weston-super-Mare. She attended Broadoak Comprehensive School (now Broadoak Mathematics and Computing College, a grammar school before 1971), then did her A levels at Weston-super-Mare College of Further Education (Weston College), studying geology, biology and chemistry.

From the University of Bristol, she gained a joint-honours degree in Zoology and Geology in 1986; her degree involved visiting the Pyrenees, Mallorca, Falmouth and Osmington Mills, Dorset. She completed a three-year Ph.D. in marine sciences at James Cook University, funded by the Science and Engineering Research Council (SERC).

== Career ==
=== BBC ===
She joined the BBC Natural History Unit in 1991, making nature documentaries. She first served as a camera operator, then director and eventually producer over the following 10 years. Specializing in underwater photography, she swam with elephants in the Andaman Islands.

From 2006 to 2012 she was executive producer for the children's programming section of the NHU, creating programmes such as Deadly (Deadly 60). She became head of the Natural History Unit in 2012, the first woman to take that position.

After departing NHU in April 2016, Darke established her own production company, True to Nature, in Bristol in 2016.

Darke won the Cherry Kearton Medal and Award (Royal Geographical Society or RGS), for cinematography in 2016.

== See also ==
- Category:Nature educational television series

Media offices
Preceded by Andrew Jackson	Head of the BBC Natural History Unit; 2012 - June 2016	Succeeded by Julian Hector
