= Sky Vision =

Production and distribution company (2002–2019)

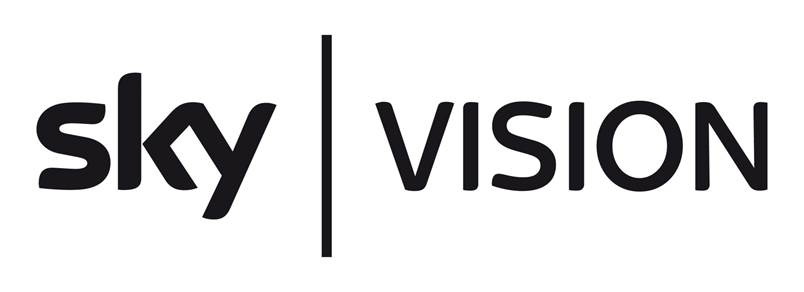
- Formerly: Parthenon Entertainment (2002–2008); Parthenon Entertainment Group (2008–2009); Parthenon Media Group (2009–2012)
- Company type: Subsidiary
- Founded: 2002; 24 years ago
- Founder: Carl Hall
- Defunct: 1 October 2019; 6 years ago
- Fate: Distribution business merged with NBCUniversal Global Distribution; Production assets transferred to Sky Studios
- Successor: NBCUniversal Global Distribution; Sky Studios
- Headquarters: Grant Way, Osterley, United Kingdom
- Area served: Worldwide
- Key people: Jane Millichip (Managing Director)
- Parent: Sky Group (2012–2019)

Sky Vision was a production and distribution company founded by Carl Hall in 2002 as Parthenon Media Group and was acquired and rebranded by Sky in 2012 as Sky Vision. The business had investments in nine production businesses in the UK and US: Love Productions, Blast Films!, Sugar Films, True North, Parthenon Entertainment, Chrysalis Vision and Sky Vision Productions in the United Kingdom, and Jupiter Entertainment, Talos Films and Znak & Co. in the United States.

In addition to its investments, the company also worked with independent producers in the UK and US including Asylum Entertainment, Double Nickel Entertainment and Peacock Alley Entertainment in North America, and Avanti Media, Bohemia, Chalkboard, LittleRock Pictures, Merman Films and Spring Films in the United Kingdom.

== History ==
Parthenon was founded in April 2002 by Carl Hall, the former managing director at HIT Entertainment subsidiary HIT Wildlife. After HIT decided to focus exclusively on its children's properties, they accepted a management buyout from Hall to purchase all of HIT Wildlife's assets including its 30 hours of programming in production and its 300-hour library.

In November 2007, investment company Arkaga Fund purchased Parthenon Entertainment. Two months later, Arkaga's children's management division Entara Ltd. was folded under Parthenon Entertainment, with the combined business rebranding as the Parthenon Entertainment Group. This allowed for Parthenon to expand to the children's media and licensing market.

In July 2009, Carl Hall purchased back Parthenon from Arkaga Fund after they filed for administration. Hall rebranded the business as the Parthenon Media Group.

In April 2019, it was announced that Sky Vision's distribution business would be folded into Comcast's NBCUniversal Global Distribution. On 1 October, Sky Vision Distribution officially merged with NBCUniversal Global Distribution. Production assets were transferred to newly founded Sky Studios in the same year.
