= Benefits Street =

British documentary series

- Genre: Documentary
- Narrated by: Tony Hirst
- Composer: Matthew Cracknell
- Country of origin: United Kingdom
- Original language: English
- No. of series: 2
- No. of episodes: 9

Production
- Production locations: Winson Green; Stockton-on-Tees
- Running time: 60 mins (inc. adverts)
- Production companies: Love Productions; Rebel Uncut

Original release
- Network: Channel 4
- Release: 6 January 2014 – 1 June 2015

Benefits Street is a British documentary series broadcast on Channel 4. It followed the lives of benefit claimants and showed them committing crimes, including a demonstration of how to shoplift, and portrayed a situation in which people are dependent on benefits and voluntarily refuse to seek employment.

The first season began airing on 6 January 2014 and ran for five episodes, during which it documented the lives of several people living on James Turner Street in the Winson Green area of Birmingham, where the media reports that 90% of residents claim benefits. The second series began airing on 11 May 2015 and ran for four episodes, with this season focusing on the residents of Kingston Road in Stockton-on-Tees.

The show was highly controversial; Channel 4, the police, and the media regulator Ofcom received hundreds of complaints, and there were death threats made against the residents of the street on Twitter. Channel 4 was accused of making poverty porn, and many of those taking part claimed that they were misled by the producers. Ofcom launched an investigation into whether the programme had breached the broadcasting regulations, but ultimately concluded its rules had not been broken. The producers defended the series, arguing that the reaction to it demonstrated the importance of making such a documentary. The series was mentioned in the House of Commons and prompted some political debate on the topic of benefits.

A number of programmes were commissioned by other channels covering the same topic, while Channel 4 commissioned a follow-up series provisionally titled Immigration Street that would follow the lives of immigrants in the UK. Benefits Street gave Channel 4 their highest viewing figures for any show since 2012.

== Background ==
In 2012, Love Productions approached the BBC with the idea for a programme that would feature a prominent member of the business community working with unemployed people, but the show did not come to fruition after the unnamed individual had to withdraw from it because of other commitments. The format for the series that would later become Benefits Street was then suggested, but the BBC declined to commission the series because it was producing a number of other programmes concerning similar issues, such as People Like Us and Nick and Margaret: We All Pay Your Benefits. Love Productions then suggested the format to Channel 4, who agreed to commission the programme.

Writing in The Observer in January 2014, Nick Mirsky, head of documentaries at Channel 4, said that Love Productions intentionally selected an area where a high proportion of the residents were in receipt of welfare payments "to show the effect of benefit cuts on a community for whom they were the principal source of income". The filming and production process took eighteen months. Both Mirsky, and Ralph Lee, Channel 4's head of factual programming, said the residents of James Turner Street were consulted about the series before filming began.

Cameras observed them over the course of a twelve-month period. The decision to call the series Benefits Street was taken two weeks before the programme aired. The comedian Frank Skinner, who is from the West Midlands, was approached to narrate the documentary but turned it down because he had concerns about how people from Birmingham would be portrayed, and did not wish to criticise the city. The voice-over was provided by former Coronation Street actor Tony Hirst instead.

The first episode of Benefits Street was aired at 9:00 pm on Monday 6 January 2014, and ran for five episodes. A live one-hour debate to discuss issues raised by the series was then scheduled to air after the final episode, Channel 4 announcing plans for this a few days after the second episode had been transmitted. During the week following the broadcasting of the third episode, West Midlands Police charged several James Turner Street residents with drugs-related offences in connection with a raid their officers had carried out in June 2013.

On 23 January, the Birmingham Mail reported that items of Benefits Street branded merchandise, such as mugs and T-shirts, were being produced for sale over the internet by individuals wishing to cash in on the programme.

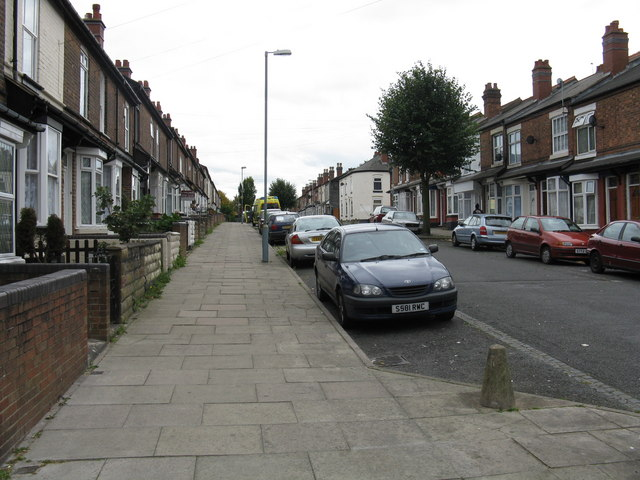
James Turner Street, seen here in 2008, is the setting for Benefits Street

=== James Turner Street ===
James Turner Street is a residential street of Victorian terraced houses in the Winson Green area of Birmingham. The street is in the city's Soho Ward, part of the Ladywood constituency, and has a B18 postcode.

It is first recorded in local records as Osborne Street in 1877, and given its present name in 1882. According to education historian Alison Wheatley, the street is possibly named after a James Turner who taught at King Edward's School in Birmingham, and the name may have been suggested by a former pupil, who became a town planner, as a way of honouring Turner's legacy. The Birmingham historian Carl Chinn believes the street was named for a local businessman and partner in the firm Hammond, Turner & Sons, a manufacturer of buttons.

Of Winson Green, Chinn writes that it was originally developed as a "better-off working class district", but that by the late 20th century many of the properties in the area were falling into decay. Dr Chris Upton, reader in public history at the city's Newman University, has described the street as part of a "ribbon development" of suburban districts built as Birmingham expanded during the latter part of the 19th century. While many of the street's original residents were locals who moved from the inner city back-to-back houses, some had moved from as far away as London and Cornwall to work in Birmingham.

Upton describes them as "the respectable working class"—skilled workers who earned around 30 shillings (£1.50) per week, and who in many cases could even afford to employ a maid. Those who grew prosperous moved to wealthier areas, and were replaced by immigrants from Asia and the West Indies, who came to the UK during the years after World War II. A high proportion of those who lived in the area were employed by Birmingham's industrial economy, which enjoyed prosperity until the collapse of the city's manufacturing industry in the early 1980s, resulting in mass unemployment. Professor Steven McCabe of Birmingham City Business School has noted that Birmingham lost 200,000 manufacturing jobs between 1971 and 1981, and that the city's GDP per capita, which in 1976 was the highest for a UK city outside the south east region, had fallen to become the lowest in England seven years later.

In the 1980s, unemployment in Birmingham reached 20%. McCabe says that in many areas, including James Turner Street, the unemployment rate has not fallen since the 1980s. Clare Short, who grew up in the area and represented Winson Green as Member of Parliament for Ladywood for 27 years, has said that high unemployment brought a "new culture of drugs, crime and mental health problems." On their website, Channel 4 have described James Turner Street as "one of Britain's most benefits-dependent streets". Sources reported in January 2014 that 90% of the street's residents are benefits claimants.

== Synopsis ==
Narrated by Tony Hirst, the series is presented in a fly on the wall documentary format that follows a year in the lives of the residents of James Turner Street, a road in the Winson Green area of Birmingham, which Channel 4 describes as "one of Britain's most benefit-dependent streets". The programme portrays a situation in which people are dependent upon welfare payments, and often lack the motivation to find employment. Some residents are seen committing crimes such as shoplifting, and attempting to raise money to support themselves and their families. Others are shown to have more ambition, such as a young mother who wants to become a model. The series also aims to show the street's sense of community spirit, with residents helping each other in times of difficulty.

== Episode list ==
No.	Title	Original release date	Viewers (millions)
1	"Episode 1"	6 January 2014	4.61
Viewers are introduced to the residents of James Turner Street in Birmingham, where there is a high proportion of benefit claimants. Residents are seen committing crimes, such as benefit fraud, cannabis cultivation and shoplifting, with the programme including a demonstration of how to steal designer clothes and remove the security tags. Shoplifter Danny is returned to prison after breaching an anti-social behaviour order that excluded him from the city centre. Fungi, another resident, takes free magazines from a hotel lobby and sells them on the streets for £2.50. Smoggy, a reformed ex-convict, sells 50p sachets of sugar and washing powder to raise money for himself. The street's sense of community is highlighted too, as White Dee—styled as the "mother" of the street because everyone turns to her for advice—offers Black Dee advice when she is threatened with eviction, and attempts to help Fungi to overcome his drug habit.
2	"Episode 2"	13 January 2014	5.51
The second episode of Benefits Street focuses on immigration. A group of Romanians arrive in the street and start a metal-collecting business. This leads to tension with other residents when the newcomers search through their household rubbish looking for recyclable material. The group is forced to move on when their electricity supply is cut off, but another group from Romania soon arrives. Promised work on a farm, they quickly discover that their gangmaster has not told them the truth about their working conditions.
3	"Episode 3"	20 January 2014	5.56
Episode 3 focuses on the children of the families on James Turner Street. The episode deals with Sam, whose son has been taken away from her because of her addiction to heroin. The programme also features Mark and Becky, a young couple struggling to raise their two young children. Children are seen swearing and misbehaving, while White Dee reprimands her son for losing his bicycle.
4	"Episode 4"	27 January 2014	5.04
The fourth episode deals with ambition. White Dee's 15-year-old daughter wishes to follow a career as a gym instructor and undertakes work experience at a leisure centre. SB, an aspiring model who left her abusive partner, has her children schooled at home, and finds work in a local takeaway. Fungi, whose electricity has been cut off, and has no contact with his children, experiences personal disappointment when a planned meeting with his son is cancelled by the boy's adoptive parents.
5	"Episode 5"	10 February 2014	4.79
The final episode of the series sees the breakdown of the relationship between Hannah and her Zimbabwean partner, Simba, who she leaves after he loses his benefits because he failed to renew his visa and starts drinking excessively. She is rehoused by the local authority, while he is left without an income because of his lapsed immigration status. Fungi goes for hospital tests after discovering a lump on his chest. He is relieved to learn it is not cancerous, but is told it is being aggravated by his lifestyle of drink and drugs. Information technology worker Ewan takes part in a cleanup initiative as the street prepares to enter a Britain in Bloom contest.

=== Follow-up programmes ===
No.	Title	Original release date
–	Benefits Street: The Last Word	17 February 2014
A 30-minute programme that catches up with those featured in Benefits Street, giving them a chance to respond to their critics. The residents of James Turner Street reflect on the reactions generated by the series, and talk about their experiences of welfare.
–	Benefits Britain: The Debate	17 February 2014
An hour-long debate presented by Richard Bacon in which guests discuss issues raised by the series.

== Reception ==
=== Political and media response ===
The programme led to some political debate on the issue of welfare. Speaking in the House of Commons on 13 January, Iain Duncan Smith, the Conservative Secretary of State for Work and Pensions, suggested the programme justified the changes being made by the Conservative–Liberal Democrat coalition government's Welfare Reform Act. The following week, Duncan Smith gave a speech to mark the tenth anniversary of his Centre for Social Justice in which he said that areas of the country were being ghettoised by long-term unemployment and had remained largely hidden from the rest of society. Conservative MP Simon Hart raised the subject of Benefits Street at Prime Minister's Questions on 15 January, saying that a street of the type seen in the series existed "in every constituency in the land".

Prime Minister and Conservative leader David Cameron responded that the government should "intervene in people's lives" to get them off benefits and into employment. After declining an invitation to visit James Turner Street, Deputy Prime Minister Nick Clegg, leader of the Liberal Democrats, said that he believed both left- and right-wing arguments on welfare were wrong. "We want a welfare system which is compassionate." Shortly after Clegg's comments, Birmingham councillor Desmond Jaddoo told the Birmingham Mail that he had compiled letters to Clegg, Cameron and Labour leader Ed Miliband on behalf of some James Turner Street residents inviting them to visit the street and asking for help to find employment.

Writing for the Wiltshire Gazette and Herald, the Liberal Democrat MP Duncan Hames argued that the programme would contribute little to the subject: "We do need to have a rational, informed debate about how to improve our welfare system, but the editorial line taken by supposedly factual ‘reality TV’ adds very little to that." The programme was condemned by the current Ladywood MP, Labour's Shabana Mahmood: "I found it shocking that Channel 4 or any other organisation would present poverty as entertainment. It was profoundly wrong." In the Radio Times, Clare Short, who represented the constituency prior to Mahmood, said the series was "totally unrepresentative" of the area, and condemned it as "crummy and misleading".

Others have also criticised Benefits Street, arguing it does not present a balanced view of the subject. Labour MP Anne Begg, chair of the Commons Work and Pensions Select Committee, said that the programme was a "misrepresentation" of people claiming benefits, arguing that it focused on those claiming unemployment benefits which makes up a small proportion of the overall welfare bill. Referring to the first episode that featured a shoplifter, Chris Williamson (also a Labour MP) said it was "irresponsible" to portray him as a typical benefits claimant.

Owen Jones, a columnist for The Independent, described the series as "medieval stocks updated for a modern format". In an article for the Birmingham Mail, writer and television personality Samantha Brick, a native of Birmingham, said that the series was an "atrociously unbalanced" view of the city. Shadow Welfare Minister Chris Bryant claimed that the residents of The Bishop's Avenue in Hampstead—known as Billionaire's Row because of its expensive properties—were as likely to have drink and drugs problems as the residents of James Turner Street.

Fraser Nelson, editor of The Spectator, suggested the programme had highlighted a section of society who have been forgotten by the politicians: "These people are people who otherwise don’t have a voice. They don’t vote, so for many years they have just not mattered". Charlie Brooker also felt the programme had been "broadly sympathetic" to those it portrays. In the Daily Mirror, entrepreneur John Bird, founder of The Big Issue, wrote that although Benefits Street did not fully represent the spectrum of people who claim benefits, it did show what could happen to those forgotten by the system "who get caught in a kind of social suicide".

==== Benefits Britain: The Debate ====
A live one-hour debate was scheduled to be broadcast by Channel 4 following the final episode of Benefits Street. Channel 4 announced on 16 January that this would be chaired by presenter Richard Bacon and feature a panel of guests who "represent the views across the political spectrum – and crucially those who claim benefits". Mentorn Media, producers of programmes such as BBC One's Question Time, was commissioned to produce the show. Originally scheduled for 10 February, the programme, titled Benefits Britain: The Debate, was subsequently moved back a week to 17 February after rival broadcaster Channel 5 announced plans for a two-hour debate about immigration for the same evening. Channel 4 said Benefits Britain: The Debate would be immediately preceded by a follow-up documentary, Benefits Street: The Last Word. The change was announced after many listings magazines had gone to press, a practice generally discouraged in the media industry.

Panelists for the programme were announced shortly before it aired, and included some Benefits Street participants, as well as Mike Penning, a minister from the Department for Work and Pensions, Chris Bryant from the opposition, Daily Telegraph columnist Allison Pearson, political editor of The Huffington Post Mehdi Hasan, and John Bird. Owen Jones, who also participated in the programme, described it as "a rowdy, chaotic show, based on the formula of "who shouts loudest"." This view was echoed by Neil Midgley of The Telegraph, who felt that both follow-up programmes "didn't live up to [the] standards" of the series, and that the debate had "sparked a lot of shouting and tumult, but very little new wisdom".

The Independent's Daisy Wyatt said the programme had "proved as rambling and unfocused as the documentary that sparked the hour-long studio show, with 'neutral' host Richard Bacon veering across topics and adding his own opinions Jeremy Kyle-style." Zoe Williams of The Guardian found the debate "unsatisfactory", feeling the topics discussed were too broad, and that Bacon was not an effective chair. However, Roz Laws of the Birmingham Mail described the debate as "articulate" and felt that "interesting points were made, such as the fact that most people on benefits are pensioners yet we didn't see any of them on Benefits Street." The debate was watched by an average audience of 3.2 million.

==== The Big Benefits Row: Live ====
Channel 5 aired The Big Benefits Row: Live, their own unconnected debate about the welfare state, on 3 February. Presented by Matthew Wright, the show featured a panel of guests made up of Conservative MP Edwina Currie, reality television star Katie Hopkins, former London Mayor Ken Livingstone, broadcaster Terry Christian, former model Annabel Giles, and two people associated with James Turner Street—charity campaigner Rev. Steve Chalke and Deirdre Kelly, known in the series as White Dee.

The programme was watched by 2.1 million viewers. The Daily Express described it as a "heated debate" in which Hopkins was heavily critical of Kelly for claiming welfare, and of Giles's modelling career. The Independent's Jess Denham felt that Hopkins's "larger-than-life personality" had dominated proceedings, while "fact-based arguments were lost to the non-stop barrage of immature tempers". The Daily Mirror described it as "a mess of a programme and a joke of a discussion".

=== Public reception ===
==== Complaints to Ofcom ====
The first episode of the series attracted several hundred complaints both to Channel 4 and the media regulator Ofcom from viewers over a variety of issues. According to The Guardian, complaints were received about alleged criminal activities, foul language and misleading portrayals of welfare claimants. By 8 January 2014, two days after the series debuted, Benefits Street had attracted 300 complaints to Ofcom and 400 to Channel 4. Ofcom said that it would assess the viewer feedback before deciding whether to launch an investigation. After generating a total of 960 complaints to Ofcom and 800 to Channel 4, the broadcasting watchdog announced on 25 February that it would investigate the programme, an inquiry described by The Guardian as "Ofcom's most high-profile investigation into a TV programme since it cleared Channel 4 of unfair racial stereotyping in Big Fat Gypsy Weddings".

Ofcom published its findings on 30 June, and concluded that Channel 4 had not breached broadcasting regulations. The watchdog looked at a number of issues raised by viewers, including concerns that rules governing child welfare had been broken, and that the programme featured "certain criminal techniques". Ofcom concluded that Benefits Street had reflected the real lives of the children taking part, and Channel 4 had taken care to limit the amount of time they were seen on screen. Of the concerns about criminal activity, the watchdog said it was "satisfied that certain essential details were not broadcast which may have enabled the successful commission of a crime, and that there was a sufficient editorial justification for including the material broadcast." The regulator also concluded that the programme had been fair in its portrayal of its participants because it was an observational documentary, and that almost 900 complaints about the "negative and offensive portrayal" needed no further investigation.

==== Other public responses ====
Following the first episode of Benefits Street, West Midlands Police said they had received a number of complaints from members of the public about alleged criminal activities that had been filmed, which they were considering whether to investigate. Alleged death threats by Twitter users against the residents were also being probed. Channel 4 said they would not provide investigators with any unbroadcast material from Benefits Street unless issued with a court order to do so.

The Birmingham Mail reported on 9 January that the programme had attracted an influx of tourists to the street, who wished to have their picture taken by the James Turner Street road sign. Steve Chalke, founder of the Oasis Academy Foundry, a charity that runs a primary school in James Turner Street, said that visitors had disrupted activity at the school and that he was preparing a complaint for Ofcom. Shortly afterwards, he submitted a letter to the watchdog alleging that children had been subject to public harassment because of the programme, and that Ofcom's rules regarding the welfare of those under the age of majority had been breached. On 13 February, newspapers, including the Daily Mirror and Daily Star, reported the theft of the James Turner Street road sign from outside the school.

In response to the filming of the second season of Benefits Street in Stockton-on-Tees, Stockton-based folk music group The Young'uns released a song called "You Won't Find Me on Benefits Street," criticizing the show and reaffirming the dignity of Stockton residents.

An online petition calling for Channel 4 to cancel the remaining episodes was launched, attracting 3,000 signatures by 8 January. A total of 60,000 people had signed it by the time the series ended on 10 February. The trade union Unite organised a protest at the offices of Love Productions on the afternoon of 13 January. A group of 30 people attended.

=== Critical reception ===
Several James Turner Street residents have claimed they were tricked into appearing in the series by Love Productions, who they say told them it would be about community spirit. One resident told the Birmingham Mail, "They told me it was about living as a community and how we all got along. But the actual programme doesn't show any of that. If they had said it was about benefits and making the street look bad I would not have taken part. They tricked us."

Responding to allegations the residents were duped, Nick Mirsky said that Love Productions had spent much time consulting the residents before filming began, and that process continued afterwards: "Key contributors have been offered viewings of the programmes during the editing period and were given the opportunity to comment on them. Both Love and Channel 4 listened to any concerns raised, and in some cases made changes to the programme to accommodate them." Deirdre Kelly told ITV's This Morning that she believed the programme had provided a one-sided view of her community, and that the residents "went into the show naively". Gareth Price of The Guardian suggested the show's producers "adeptly edited their film in order to provoke a response from its intended audience".

Sources including The Independent and Broadcast reported that several commentators had accused Channel 4 of making "poverty porn". In response, Ralph Lee challenged those accusations during a debate on the 9 January edition of BBC Two's Newsnight programme: "It’s inaccurate and it’s patronising towards the people that take part in these programmes and open up their lives, and it’s quite offensive to the people who make them." Mirsky claimed the reaction to Benefits Street demonstrated how it had "touched a nerve" and subsequently proved it was "essential" the series was made.

The boss of Love Productions, Richard McKerrow, also defended the series, saying it was not about "demonising the poor...It’s a very honest and true portrayal of life in Britain and people are frightened of it." Writing as the series concluded, The Daily Telegraph's Neil Midgley felt that Benefits Street had not exploited its participants, and was "definitely the kind of series that Channel 4 should be making: easy to grasp and innovative, and yet a blinding revelation of some ills that are at the heart of modern Britain." Midgley's view was echoed by Jay Hunt, Channel 4's chief creative officer, who described the series as "a perfect Channel 4 show [because] It engaged a huge audience and got millions of people thinking about the welfare state and people at the bottom of society."

Emma Johnson, the head teacher of the Oasis school, organised a public meeting on the evening of 15 January to discuss issues raised by the programme. The event was attended by around 100 residents from the area. BBC journalist David Lumb said reporters were not allowed to take pictures, and those present felt the occasion was "an opportunity to preach a political agenda". The meeting was told that an employed couple who were filmed for the series were dropped from the final version. Love Productions said this was because the show was about people on benefits, and one of the unnamed pair was a benefits officer.

After the third episode was televised on 20 January, the Daily Mail reported that community leaders and residents had accused Channel 4 of exploiting children, claiming it had led to the children featured in the documentary becoming targets for bullying. In response, a Channel 4 spokeswoman said that consent from parents and guardians, and the children themselves was obtained before filming began "in accordance with the relevant sections of the Ofcom broadcasting code. Any children without consent have been blurred in programmes."

The Birmingham Mail reported on 10 February that figures released to the newspaper by Birmingham City Council's fraud investigation service indicated instances of benefit fraud in the city were lower than had been suggested by the documentary, with 851 prosecutions in the five years preceding 2014, an average of 0.5% of total benefit claimants. Furthermore, of the 152,000 housing benefit claimants in Birmingham, 178 were prosecuted for fraudulent claims in 2013.

=== Viewership ===
Overnight figures indicated the show's first episode attracted 4.3 million viewers and a 17.7% share of viewing, more than any Channel 4 show in the whole of 2013. The second instalment, aired on 13 January, saw an increase of almost a million viewers to 5.1 million, a 20.8% share of the audience and beating ITV's The Bletchley Circle and an edition of Panorama on BBC One and its own former show Celebrity Big Brother (now on Channel 5) which aired in the same time slot.

The third episode drew 5.2 million viewers giving it a 21.2% share of the audience, making it the most popular programme in the 9:00 pm time slot for the second week in a row, and giving Channel 4 their highest ratings since their coverage of the closing ceremony of the 2012 Summer Paralympics in September 2012. The fourth episode attracted fewer viewers, with an average of 4.1 million, and was behind the first part of Jeremy Paxman's World War I documentary series Britain's Great War, which aired on BBC One and had an average viewership of 4.23 million. The final episode drew 4.5 million viewers, an 18.6% audience share, but was beaten by ITV's DCI Banks which was watched by an average 6 million viewers.

Episode no.	Date	Total viewers (including +1) (in millions)	Share	Channel 4 weekly ranking
1	6 January 2014	5.42	14.4%	1
2	13 January 2014	6.45	17.5%	1
3	20 January 2014	6.48	18.4%	1
4	27 January 2014	5.87	16.9%	1
5	10 February 2014	5.47	16.0%	1

== Aftermath and related series ==
As the first series of Benefits Street came to a close on 10 February 2014, Love Productions confirmed to the Birmingham Mail that it was investigating potential locations for a second series, but that this would not be filmed in Birmingham. On 11 March, the Liverpool Echo reported that a number of residents on a street in Birkenhead had been approached to appear in a second series, but did not wish to take part. Channel 4 subsequently confirmed the programme would not be filmed in Birkenhead.

In April, the Teesside Evening Gazette reported similar approaches had been made to a number of people living in the Middlesbrough area, while The Northern Echo reported that "two young women, both dressed down in leggings and jumpers but with cut-glass southern accents [and describing] themselves as TV producers" were attempting to persuade residents of a street in Stockton-on-Tees to take part. The Evening Gazette reported on 21 May that residents in Stockton had chased and thrown eggs at researchers when they made a return visit to a street in the town. In April, The Guardian reported that Love Productions were "[facing] opposition from politicians and community leaders" in their attempt to secure participants for the series. In the same article, Kieran Smith, Executive Producer of Love Productions, conceded that the controversy surrounding the series had made it more difficult to find locations for future programmes, but hoped "to settle on somewhere soon".

Speaking to BBC Radio 5 Live on 16 April, Smith confirmed plans for a follow-up series provisionally titled Immigration Street that would focus on immigration issues, but said Channel 4 were yet to commission the programme. However, the Southern Daily Echo reported that some filming had already taken place in an area of Southampton, where city leaders had voiced their opposition to the series. Simon Letts of Southampton City Council expressed concerns the programme could lead to racial tension, while the area's Member of Parliament, Alan Whitehead, suggested it "would follow a set script as opposed to accurately portraying reality".

In July 2014, Channel 4 confirmed that the series, provisionally titled Immigration Street, would be filmed in Derby Road, in the Bevois area of Southampton. After protests from local residents, the planned series was reduced to a single episode which aired on 24 February 2015. In August 2014, Love Productions also confirmed that a second series of Benefits Street was being filmed in Kingston Road, Stockton-on-Tees. Alex Cunningham, the Labour MP for Stockton North said he was "deeply disappointed" that the series was being filmed there.

In February 2014, Channel 5 confirmed to Broadcast magazine that it was in the process of filming a similar documentary, provisionally titled Living on the Social, in which individuals and families would discuss their lives on welfare. The Hull Daily Mail reported in March that Channel 5 were looking at Hull as a potential location for the series, but that the city council had urged residents not to participate. The Yorkshire Post reported a similar approach to residents in Bridlington in April. Love Productions also announced plans for Famous, Rich and Hungry, a two-part documentary for the BBC's Sport Relief that would see celebrities spending time with families experiencing food poverty in order to explore the issue.

=== Imprisonment of Samora Roberts ===
In January 2016, Samora Roberts, known on the show as Black Dee, was sentenced to 7 years prison for possessing ammunition, heroin, and two counts of possession of crack cocaine with intent to supply.

=== Death of Lee Nutley ===
On 10 October 2016, Lee Nutley, a series regular on Benefits Street, was found dead on the estate in the north east where the show's second series was filmed. An ambulance crew discovered Nutley's body at home in Stockton on Kingston Road.

=== Imprisonment of Neil Maxwell ===
In June 2019, Neil Maxwell, who "appeared on Benefits Street", was jailed for life with a minimum term of 30 years, for the murder of Lee Cooper. Maxwell, along with an accomplice named Luke Pearson, had brutally beaten Cooper in what the judge called "a rampage of violence".

=== Death of James "Fungi" Clarke ===
On 1 July 2019, James Clarke, aged 50, and a "star of Benefits Street", died of cardiac arrest. His body was discovered in the early hours of Monday morning after police had been called.
