= Famous, Rich and Hungry =

- Genre: Factual
- Country of origin: United Kingdom
- Original language: English
- No. of series: 1
- No. of episodes: 2

Production
- Running time: 60 minutes
- Production company: Love Productions

Original release
- Network: BBC One; BBC One HD
- Release: 12 March – 13 March 2014

Related
- Rich, Famous and in the Slums

Famous, Rich and Hungry is a British factual television series that was first broadcast on BBC One on 12 March 2014. The two-part series is part of the Sport Relief 2014 season of programming. It shows Cheryl Fergison, Rachel Johnson, Jamie Laing and Theo Paphitis experiencing food poverty in the United Kingdom. The series has been called the celebrity version of Benefits Street.

== Production ==
The series is produced by Love Productions and the executive producers are Richard McKerrow and Kieran Smith.
