= Love Productions =

Television production company

Love Productions Limited
- Type: Subsidiary
- Industry: Television production
- Founded: 3 September 2004; 22 years ago in United Kingdom
- Founders: Richard McKerrow; Anna Beattie
- Headquarters: London, England
- Number of locations: 3
- Products: Benefits Street; The Baby Borrowers; The Great British Bake Off; Tower Block of Commons
- Parent: Sky Vision (70%; 2014–2020); Sky Studios (2020–present)
- Website: loveproductions.co.uk

Love Productions Limited is a UK-based television production company. Its cooking competition series The Great British Bake Off is among the most watched shows in the UK of its era.

== History ==
Richard McKerrow and Anna Beattie formed Love Productions in 2004. In 2014, Sky acquired a 70% stake in Love Productions. In 2020, Sky bought the remaining shares making the studio a wholly owned subsidiary, seemingly part of a strategy to build a production empire. The acquisition came on the back of increased dividends for Sky 2019 of £22.7 million compared with £3.5 million in 2018; while two directors received £4.6 million in 2019, up from three directors receiving £1.4 million in 2018.

In 2020, the company's key "Bake off" series of productions has been postponed due to the COVID-19 pandemic which is likely to result in a loss of income in 2020/21.

Love Productions is also associated with the brands Love West, based in Bristol, and Love Productions USA.

As part of the ongoing takeover of ITV's broadcasting arm by Sky, Love Productions is expected to be sold to ITV Studios.

== Productions ==
The list of programmes produced by Love Productions include:

Title	Genre	Network(s)	First broadcast
Cirque de Celebrité	Game show	Sky One	2006
The Baby Borrowers	Reality television	BBC Three	2007
The Great British Bake Off	Baking	BBC Two (2010–2013); BBC One (2014–2016); Channel 4 (2017–)	2010
Tower Block of Commons	Documentary	Channel 4	2010
Junior Bake Off	Baking	CBBC (2011–2016); Channel 4 (2019–)	2011
Rich, Famous and in the Slums	Factual	BBC One	2011
Make Bradford British	Documentary	Channel 4	2012
The Great British Sewing Bee	Sewing	BBC Two (2013–2019); BBC One (2020–)	2013
Benefits Street	Documentary	Channel 4	2014
Famous, Rich and Hungry	Factual	BBC One	2014
The Great Pottery Throw Down	Pottery	BBC Two (2015–2017); More4 (2020); Channel 4 (2021–)	2015
The Chronicles of Nadiya	Documentary	BBC One	2016
Battle of Britain: Model Squadron	Structured reality	Channel 4	2018
The Biggest Little Railway in the World	Structured reality	Channel 4	2018
Westside	Reality television	Netflix	2018
Singapore Social	Docuseries	Netflix	2019
The Piano	Talent show	Channel 4	2023
Your Song	Talent show	Channel 4	2026

== Controversies ==
Love Productions' best earning programme, The Great British Bake Off, had moved network channel from BBC Two to BBC One after three series due to its increasing popularity. Towards the end of series six, Love Productions's profits were decreasing; the company wished to remain on BBC One, however the £75 million asking price for three series was unacceptable to the BBC. Controversy arose as there were concerns the nature of the show would change with the move to Channel 4 and because most of the show's presenters did not make the move for the following series.
