= Shop Smart, Save Money (2018 TV series) =

- Presented by: Gaby Roslin (2018-); Fiona Phillips (2018–2019); Alexis Conran (2018-); Andy Webb (2018-)
- Country of origin: United Kingdom
- Original language: English
- No. of series: 3
- No. of episodes: 19

Production
- Production location: United Kingdom
- Running time: 55-60 minutes (inc. adverts)
- Production company: True North Productions

Original release
- Network: Channel 5
- Release: 18 May 2018 – present

Shop Smart: Save Money is a British topical series that was broadcast on Channel 5. Each week the series delivers the latest deals, offers, tips and tricks to make sure that each week "British shoppers are getting the very best value for money." It was presented by Gaby Roslin, Fiona Phillips and later Alexis Conran. The name of the programme was reused for the new iteration of The Gadget Show in 2023.

== Production ==
Shop Smart: Save Money was produced by True North Productions. The programme debuted on Channel 5 in June 2018.

The programme was presented by Gaby Roslin, Fiona Phillips and later Alexis Conran. Also in the programme is Andy Webb as the "Deal Detective".

== Episodes ==
=== Series 1 ===
Episode	Date of Transmission	Synopsis
1	6 June 2018	The series begins with some deals and tips, delivered "hot off the press" by Gaby Roslin and Fiona Phillips. Also, the show's "Smart Shoppers" go head to head on a supermarket dash to help a family whose food shopping bill is out of control. On one side we have Bargainista Kelly from Cardiff. And challenging her at the checkout are Buy One Get One Free Twins Jo & Leisa. Armed with a list of the family's culinary likes and dislikes, the challengers will be scouring the aisles for bargains and sharing tips and tricks you simply can't afford to miss. Deal Detective Andy takes up the 1K Challenge. In this episode, he helps a young couple desperate to buy a bigger house but are unable to save any cash. There are some savings made after slashing their car costs and some other money saving ideas. Andy is also in the studio with Gaby and Fiona, delivering some hot-off-the-press deals going live the weekend following the show's transmission.
2	13 June 2018	The show's "Smart Shoppers" go head-to-head in a Manchester market, haggling for bargains and helping a family deal with an out of control food bill. Deal Detective Andy takes up a new £1K Challenge. He helps a family who say they never have time to look at their finances. It transpires that they have been with the same utility provider for over a decade. Andy is also in the studio with Gaby and Fiona, delivering some up-to-the-minute offers going live the weekend of transmission. Finally, reporter Alexis Conran puts some of the UK's favourite brands on trial. This week he's lifting the lid on that lunchtime favourite: the shop-bought sandwich.
3	20 June 2018	The show's Smart Shoppers help another family save on their summer holiday essentials. Deal Detective Andy takes up a new £1K Challenge. He helps a family cut the cost of booking a break abroad and who want to put some extra cash aside in preparation for their daughter going to university. Andy will also be in the studio with Gaby and Fiona, delivering some bang-up-to -the-minute offers going live this weekend. The Shop Smart team has done the hard work so you don't have to and will be bringing you even more cash-saving tips and advice Finally, reporter Alexis Conran examines why over the counter medicines for headaches, hay fever and the like vary so much in price.
