= Acetrax =

- Industry: technology
- Founded: 2006
- Headquarters: Zurich, Switzerland
- Area served: Europe
- Parent: Sky

Acetrax was a video on demand company which was founded in the UK and Switzerland and incorporated as a Swiss company in Zürich in 2006. The company was later acquired by Sky, a British telecommunications company. The company provided over-the-top (OTT) content in Europe, for connected TVs. As of 2011, the company claimed to have their contents on TVs in 282 million households, in 48 countries.

Sky acquired Acetrax in 2012 to expand their OTT capabilities. The gross assets of Acetrax stood at £2.3 million as of 31 December 2011, according to Sky.

By 2013, Acetrax had partnered with a variety of smart TVs and media players, including LG, Samsung, Toshiba, Panasonic, Philips and WD TV.

Acetrax ceased operations as of 21 June 2013. The service was integrated into Sky's on-demand service Sky Store.

== Apps ==
As well as video on demand, Acetrax has also created an app which is embedded in phones such as Samsung, LG, Panasonic, Toshiba, Grundig.

== See also ==
- Cisco Systems
- Enhanced TV
- Hybrid digital TV
- Hybrid Broadcast Broadband TV
- Interactive television
- Hotel television systems
- List of digital distribution platforms for mobile devices
- Over-the-top content
- Tivoization
