= Timeline of Sky Group =

This is a timeline of the history of Sky Television.

== 1970s and 1980s ==
- 1977
  - 21 October – The World Administrative Radio Conference assigns each country five high-powered direct broadcast by satellite channels for domestic use.
- 1980
  - Plans for a pan-European satellite television station are put together by Brian Haynes, back by backed by Guinness Mahon and Barclays Merchant Bank and in November Mr Haynes sets up Satellite Television Ltd. (SATV)
- 1981
  - 21 October – SATV begins test transmissions on the Orbital Test Satellite after the European Space Agency allowed the company to test the satellite for the use of commercial television, with an hour of light entertainment in English each night. The low-powered satellite forces it to broadcast to cable systems rather than directly to individual satellite dishes.
- 1982
  - February – The BBC is awarded two of the five channels DBS satellite channels.
  - 26 April – Satellite Television launches as a pan-European service. The channel was often referred to on-screen as Super Station Europe. However the channel is initially only available in some European countries, with Norway and Finland being the first two countries to permit the new service's transmission via cable, followed by Malta, Switzerland and West Germany.
- 1983
  - 27 June – News International becomes the majority shareholder of Satellite Television.
  - 16 October – Satellite Television begins broadcasting in the UK.
  - Autumn – Shortly after the Home Secretary announced that the three remaining satellite channels would be given to the Independent Broadcasting Authority (IBA) to allow the private sector to compete against the BBC, starts talking with the IBA about a joint project to help cover the cost. The Government subsequently gives permission and a consortium emerges consisting of the BBC, Granada, Anglia, Virgin, Thorn EMI, Pearson Longman and Consolidated Satellite Broadcasting. The BBC holds a 50% stake in the consortium.
- 1984
  - 16 January – Satellite Television is renamed Sky Channel.
  - 25 June – The consortium wanting to launch satellite television announces that the original launch date of 1986 will be delayed until 1989.
- 1985
  - 15 June – The consortium which has been planning to launch satellite television in the UK collapses on costs grounds.
- 1986
  - 2 April – The IBA invites bids from the private sector to operate a commercial service on three of the five DBS channels allocated to the UK in 1977 for satellite broadcasting.
  - 11 December – The IBA announces that BSB has been awarded a fifteen-year franchise to operate the satellite television service.
- 1988
  - 8 June – Having failed to become part of the BSB consortium, Rupert Murdoch announces plans to launch a four-channel service on the soon to be launched Astra satellite.
  - 11 December – The satellite on which Sky Television will broadcast, Astra 1A, is successfully launched by communications satellite company SES.
- 1989
  - 5 February – Sky Television launches at 6.00pm. The channel line-up consists of Sky Channel, Sky News, Sky Movies and Eurosport.
  - 3 June – Sky Television and The Walt Disney Company come to an arrangement which allows to broadcast movies for a five-year period, this agreement comes a few weeks after plans to create a full-time channel were scrapped, although a Disney-branded version eventually launched on 1 October 1995.
  - June – BSB is awarded the other two DBS channel slots, meaning that the service will launch with five channels. These two channels had originally been allocated to the BBC but were handed over for commercial use when the BBC dropped its plans to use the two channels on cost grounds.
  - 31 July – Sky Channel becomes a UK and Ireland-only service and is renamed Sky One although for a short time after the relaunch, some of Sky Channel's former pan-European programming is broadcast in the hours before Eurosport's startup, and the programme block is branded as Sky Europe.

== 1990s ==
- 1990
  - 5 February – Sky Movies is fully encrypted, thereby becoming Sky's first pay channel.
  - 11 February – Sky Movies broadcasts its first special event – the boxing fight between Mike Tyson and Buster Douglas.
  - 25 March – BSB launches, but initially only on cable - the channels do not begin broadcasting on satellite until the end of April. Its channels are Galaxy, Now, The Movie Channel, The Sports Channel and The Power Station. BSB had planned to launch in September 1989 but problems with the supply of receiving equipment had delayed the launch.
  - 2 September – Sky One begins airing the American animated series The Simpsons.
  - 2 November – Sky TV and BSB merge. The new company is called BSkyB.
  - 2 December – Galaxy and Now are closed down and are replaced on the Marcopolo satellite by Sky One and Sky News although arts programmes are shown for a short time on Marco Polo as a weekend opt-out service from Sky News so that contractual obligations can be fulfilled. This opt-out service is called Sky Arts.
- 1991
  - 8 April – The Power Station closes at 4.00am and two hours later at 6.00am, Sky Movies launches in its place on the Marcopolo satellite.
  - 15 April — The Movie Channel launches on Astra 1B.
  - 20 April – Sky Sports launches, replacing the BSB Sports Channel.
  - 6 May –
    - Eurosport briefly closes after the competing Screensport channel had filed a complaint to the European Commission over its corporate structure. TF1 Group subsequently steps in to replace BSkyB as Eurosport's joint owners when the service resumes on 22 May.
    - Sky Movies and The Movie Channel begin broadcasting 24 hours a day. Previously they had been on air from early afternoon until the early hours of the next morning.
  - 26 May – The final Sky Arts weekend output takes place on the Marco Polo satellite.
  - 1 October – The Comedy Channel launches.
- 1992
  - February – TV-am closes its in-house news service and contracts out news bulletins to Sky News.
  - 18 May – Sky purchases the live rights to the newly formed football Premier League for £304 million.
  - 1 July – Sky sells the Marcopolo satellite to Telenor of Norway for about £30 million.
  - 15 August – Sky Sports launches Sports Saturday. The programme follows the same format as the BBC's Grandstand programme featuring a mix of sporting action, concluding with the day's football results.
  - 16 August – To mark the start of Sky Sports's coverage of the Premier League, the channel launches an afternoon-long football programme called Super Sunday.
  - 1 September –
    - Sky Sports becomes a subscription channel.
    - Sky Movies stops showing non-movies content. It had previously shown selected premium content such as live boxing, music concerts and World Wrestling Federation due to it having been Sky's only encrypted channel and had been known as Sky Movies Plus.
  - 1 October – The Comedy Channel closes and is replaced by Sky Movies Gold, a "classic movies" service is launched as part of Sky Movies package and broadcasts from late afternoon until the early hours, with the first film is shown at 6.00pm on the new network was 1979's Rocky II.
  - 31 December – Sky stops broadcasting via the Marcopolo satellite.
- 1993
  - 1 February – BSkyB introduces a new system of film ratings often used for various times, replacing the British Board of Film Classification certificates.
  - 1 September – Sky Multichannels launches.
- 1994
  - 19 August – Sky Sports 2 launches, initially as a weekend-only service,
  - 3 October – Sky Soap and Sky Travel launch as part-time weekday channels.
- 1995
  - 1 November – Sky Sports Gold launches.
- 1996
  - 16 March – The boxing match between Frank Bruno and Mike Tyson is the UK's first pay-per-view event.
  - 16 August –
    - Sky Sports 3 launches.
    - Sky Sports is renamed Sky Sports 1
    - Sky Sports Gold closes.
  - 1 September – Sky 2 and The Computer Channel launch.
  - 1 October – Granada Sky Broadcasting, in conjunction with ITV, launches. The channel line-up consists of Granada Plus, Granada Good Life, Granada Men & Motors and Granada Talk TV
  - 1 November – A joint venture between Scottish Television and BSkyB results in the launch of Sky Scottish.
- 1997
  - 31 January – BSkyB enters into a joint venture with ITV companies Granada Television and Carlton Television to create British Digital Broadcasting (BDB) so that they can apply to operate three digital terrestrial television (DTT) licences.
  - 25 June – BSkyB is forced by the Independent Television Commission to pull out of BDB on competition grounds.
  - 31 August – Granada Talk TV and Sky 2 stops broadcasting.
  - 1 September – Sky Sports 2 becomes a full-time service.
  - 1 November – Sky Movies and The Movie Channel are rebranded under the Sky Movies Screen banner and are now called Sky Movies Screen 1 and Sky Movies Screen 2.
  - 1 December – Sky Box Office launches a four-channel near on-demand movies service. It also carried by Cable & Wireless chooses not to use the service, instead opting for Front Row.
- 1998
  - 1 May – Granada Good Life is renamed Granada Breeze.
  - 31 May – Sky Scottish stops broadcasting.
  - 15 August – On the first day of the 1998–99 football season, the first edition of Soccer Saturday is broadcast. The afternoon-long football scores and results service replaces Sports Saturday.
  - 10 September – Sky Movies Screen 1 becomes Sky MovieMax, Sky Movies Screen 2 becomes Sky Premier, and Sky Movies Gold is renamed Sky Cinema.
  - 1 October – Sky Digital launches, Sky Sports News launches, Sky Movies launches seven more channels and many more Sky Movies Box Office channels start broadcasting.
  - 15 November – Rival digital television service ONdigital launches and despite Sky no longer being a partner in the venture, some Sky channels include Sky One, Sky Sports channels (Sky Sports 1 and Sky Sports 3 – Sky Sports 2 is added later) and two Sky Movies channels, do appear on the service.
- 1999
  - April – Sky Sports launches its interactive service, Sky Sports Active.
  - 30 April – Sky Soap closes.
  - June – Sky News launches Sky News Radio.
  - 22 August – Sky Sports Xtra launches, initially primarily as an interactive service.
  - 1 October – Sky MovieMax 5 launches.

== 2000s ==
- 2000
  - March – Sky News Active launches.
  - 10 April – Sky Sports News is renamed Sky Sports.com TV.
- 2001
  - The first Sky+ boxes go on sale.
  - 1 July – The Sky Sports.com TV brand is scrapped and the channel reverts to its original name of Sky Sports News.
  - 18 August – PremPlus launches.
  - 2 September – .tv stops broadcasting.
  - September – Sky launches its first personal video recorder, Sky +.
  - 27 September – Sky stops broadcasting via analogue. Sky had originally planned to switch off its analogue service earlier in 2001 but delayed it by three months due to the possibility of lost revenue from the remaining analogue subscribers, thereby giving those customers extra time to switch to Sky's digital service. The last channel to stop broadcasting via analogue satellite is Sky One.
  - 1 October – Following its acquisition of interactive service Open..., Sky launches Sky Active.
- 2002
  - 7 January – Sky News content becomes available on terrestrial television for the first time in a decade when Channel 5 begins simulcasting part of its breakfast news programme Sunrise.
  - 1 March – F1 Digital+ launches. It offers enhanced multi-screen coverage of Formula One on a pay-per-view basis.
  - 1 May – ITV Digital stops broadcasting.
  - 1 July – In another major rebranding of Sky Movies, the Sky Premier channels are renamed Sky Movies Premier, the Sky MovieMax channels become Sky Movies Max and the Sky Cinema channels become Sky Movies Cinema.
  - 30 October – Freeview launches and Sky contributes three channels – Sky News, Sky Sports News and Sky Travel – to the platform.
  - 9 December – Sky One Mix launches.
  - 12 December – After just one season, F1 Digital+ closes.
- 2003
  - February – Sky Travel Shop launches as a full-time travel retail channel.
  - 17 April – Sky launches three music channels – The Amp, Scuzz and Flaunt. The channels are operated on Sky's behalf by CSC Media Group channels.
  - June – The Sky Movies Premier Widescreen channel is closed and the majority of films on the remaining channels are now shown in widescreen.
  - 1 November – The Sky Movies Premier and Sky Movies Max channels are brought under one banner as Sky Movies 1 through 9 and Sky Movies Cinema 1 and 2 become Sky Cinema 1 and 2.
- 2004
  - 24 May – Sky News launches Sky News Ireland – a 30-minute news bulletin for viewers in the Republic of Ireland.
  - 11 June – At the Races relaunches as a stand-alone venture. Between 2000 and 2003 the channel had been on air in conjunction with Channel 4.
  - August – Football First launches. The programme allows viewers to choose the game they want to watch.
  - 1 November – ITV buys out BSkyB's stake in Granada Sky Broadcasting.
- 2005
  - 1 January – Sky News takes over the contract to provide Channel 5's news service from ITN. The first scheduled Sky produced news programme had been due to air on 3 January, but two shorter bulletins for 1 and 2 January were hastily added to provide updates following the Indian Ocean tsunami on Boxing Day 2004.
  - January – Sky Travel +1 launches.
  - June – Sky takes full control of Artsworld, two years after it bought a 50% stake in the channel.
  - 31 October – Sky One Mix is rebranded as Sky Two, and Sky Three launches on Freeview which replaced Sky Travel.
- 2006
  - January – Sky launches its online television service Sky By Broadband, which is rebranded later in 2006 to Sky Anytime on PC.
  - 30 January – A tenth Sky Movies channel is launched and Sky Movies starts broadcasting two HD channels. Sky Movies 9 and the new Sky Movies 10 are PIN-protected, meaning that for the first time 15 rated films were able to be shown as early as 5.00pm.
  - 2 March – Alternative/indie music channel The Amp is relaunched as a classic hits channel called Bliss.
  - 22 May –
    - Sky Sports becomes the exclusive broadcaster of all live cricket matches in the UK following the ECB awarding Sky exclusive coverage of all of England's home tests, one-day internationals and Twenty20 Internationals.
    - Sky launches its high definition service when Sky One HD and Sky Sports HD1 begin broadcasting.
  - 31 July – Sky Sports HD2 launches.
  - 3 November – The final edition of Sky News Ireland is broadcast.
  - December – Sky sells their three music channels Bliss (previously The Amp), Scuzz, and Flaunt to Chart Show Channels. CSC had previously operated the channels on Sky's behalf.
- 2007
  - 1 March –
    - The Sky basics channels stop broadcasting on Virgin Media when the two companies cannot agree a new carriage deal.
    - Sky Arts launches, replacing Artsworld.
  - 27 March – Sky launches its on-demand service Sky Anytime.
  - 4 April – Sky Movies is revamped with each channel now covering a specific genre and are renamed. The new line-up is Sky Movies Premiere, Sky Movies Premiere +1, Sky Movies Comedy, Sky Movies Action & Thriller, Sky Movies Family, Sky Movies Drama, Sky Movies Classics, Sky Movies Sci-Fi & Horror, Sky Movies Modern Greats, Sky Movies Indie, Sky Movies HD1 and Sky Movies HD2.
  - 6 May – PremPlus closes.
  - 7 November –
    - Sky Real Lives launches.
    - Sky Travel is relaunched as a holiday retail channel, replacing Sky Travel Shop. Sky Travel +1 is renamed Sky Real Lives +1 and Sky Travel Extra becomes Sky Real Lives 2.
- 2008
  - 17 March – Sky Sports HD3 launches.
  - 20 March – A HD simulcast of Sky Movies Premiere is launched.
  - 16 May – Sky Anytime on PC is rebranded as Sky Player, along with updated software to include live simulcasts of Sky News and Sky Sports.
  - 18 August – Sky Arts +1 starts broadcasting.
  - 31 August – Sky One, Sky Two and Sky Three are renamed Sky1, Sky2 and Sky3 respectively.
  - October – High-definition simulcast channels of Sky Movies Action/Thriller, Sky Movies Sci-Fi/Horror, Sky Movies Drama, Sky Movies Modern Greats, Sky Movies Family and Sky Movies Comedy launch.
  - 20 October – Sky Arts 2 launches and focusses on classical music, opera, dance and fine arts programming.
  - 13 November – The Sky Basics channels return to Virgin Media.
- 2009
  - 26 October – Sky Movies Indie HD launches.

== 2010s ==
- 2010
  - 6 January – Sky Sports Xtra is renamed Sky Sports 4.
  - 26 March – Some Sky Movies channels are renamed. Sky Movies Showcase replaces Sky Movies Screen 1, Sky Movies Action & Thriller is renamed Sky Movies Action & Adventure, Sky Movies Drama becomes Sky Movies Drama & Romance and Sky Movies Screen 2 becomes Sky Movies Crime & Thriller.
  - 3 April – Sky 3D launches, although it is initially only available in commercial premises.
  - 29 April – Sky Sports HD4 launches.
  - 6 May – Sky News HD launches.
  - 10 May–9 August – Sky conducts three-month experimental revision of Sky Two, under which Sky Two predominantly operated a one-hour timeshift of programming on Sky One.
  - June –
    - Sky Sports Radio launches.
    - Sky TV removes Music Choice. It had been available on Sky since it launched its digital service in 1998.
  - 24 June – Sky Travel closes due to the increased competition from the internet for the holiday retail market.
  - 5 July – Living Loves launches. The channel shows comedy and drama programmes that have recently aired on Living, and broadcasts each day between 3.00pm and 2.00am.
  - 13 July – British Sky Broadcasting buys Virgin Media Television, thereby adding several channels, including Channel One, Bravo, Bravo 2, Challenge, Challenge Jackpot and Living to its portfolio.
  - 9 August – Sky Movies Classics HD launches.
  - 19 August – Sky Real Lives closes and some of the factual content shown on the channel moves to Sky 2.
  - 23 August – Sky Sports News stops broadcasting on Freeview and a HD version of the channel is launched. On Freeview, Sky Sports News is replaced by Sky 3 +1.
  - 1 October – Sky 3D becomes available to residential customers for the first time.
- 2011
  - 1 January –
    - Sky closes four of the channels - the Bravo channels and Challenge Jackpot - that it had bought following its purchase of Virgin Media Television the previous year.
  - 1 February –
    - Sky Atlantic launches.
    - Channel One closes and its slot on Freeview is given to Challenge. Much of Channel One's programming moves to Sky's free-to-air channel Pick.
    - Living is renamed Sky Living and Living Loves is renamed Sky Living Loves.
  - 28 February – Sky 3 is rebranded as Pick TV.
  - 6 July – Sky Anytime is merged with Sky Mobile and is rebranded as Sky Go. Key changes include the ability to watch live channels in line with your Sky TV subscription at no additional cost, limited to two simultaneous devices.
  - 5 September – Sky Living Loves begins broadcasting 24 hours a day.
  - 20 September – Pick TV +1 is removed from Freeview.
  - 12 October – The final edition of Sky Magazine is published.
  - 8 November – ITN confirms it has secured a five-year contract to resume production of 5 News from early 2012, meaning Sky News will cease to broadcast on the channel from the end of 2011.
- 2012
  - 21 February – Sky Living Loves stops broadcasting.
  - 9 March – Sky Sports F1 launches.
  - 17 July – Sky launches Now TV. It is launched to provide access to Sky TV to those who have no existing pay TV subscription and do not want to be tied into a contract. The service offered only films at first, adding sports in March 2013, and entertainment channels in October 2013.
  - 12 November – Sky One launches a +1 channel although for licensing reasons, The Simpsons is not broadcast on the timeshift channel.
- 2013
  - 28 March – Sky Movies Disney is launched, effectively replacing Disney Cinemagic. To facilitate the new channel, Sky Movies Classics stops broadcasting, Sky Movies Modern Greats is rebranded as Sky Movies Greats and Sky Movies Indie becomes Sky Movies Select.
  - 30 June – Sky Sports launches its first temporary channel Sky Sports Ashes to provide full coverage of the 2013 Ashes Series. Temporary channel renaming of this nature is now common practice within Sky, both for sports and movies.
  - 7 October – Pick TV is rebranded as Pick.
  - 30 October – digital teletext serviceSky Text closes.
- 2014
  - 12 August –
    - Sky Sports 5 launches, primarily to broadcast European football.
    - Sky Sports News is rebranded Sky Sports News HQ.
  - September – Sky Sports News Radio closes.
  - 13 October – Following BSkyB's 2014 acquisition of Sky Italia and a majority 90.04% interest in Sky Deutschland in November 2014, its holding company British Sky Broadcasting Group plc changes its name to Sky plc. The United Kingdom operations also changes the company name from British Sky Broadcasting Limited to Sky UK Limited, and still trades as Sky.
- 2015
  - 31 January – Sky Active closes.
  - 9 June –
    - The two Sky Arts channels merge into a single service.
    - Sky 3D closes as a linear channel. with 3D programming transferring to On Demand services.
    - Sky Livingit is rebranded as Real Lives.
- 2016
  - 9 February – Sky launches its latest set-top box Sky Q. and later in 2016, Sky stops selling its Sky+ HD box to new customers.
  - 8 July – Sky Movies is rebranded as Sky Cinema.
  - 13 August – Sky Sports broadcasts its first event in UHD.
  - 24 August – Sky Sports Mix launches. It is available to all Sky customers, and is designed to offer a sampling of content from the full range of Sky Sports networks to non-Sky Sports customers.
- 2017
  - 4 January – Sky Cinema Box Office closes.
  - 18 July – Sky Sports is revamped with the numbered channels being replaced by sports-specific channels. These include two channels dedicated to football, a cricket channel and a golf channel. Other sports are moved to two new channels – Action and Arena – and a showcase channel called Sky Sports Main Event is launched which features simulcasts of the top events being shown on Sky Sports that day. Also, Sky Sports News drops the HQ label.
- 2018
  - 23 January – Fox's £11.7bn bid to take full control of Sky is provisionally blocked by the Competition and Markets Authority (CMA) amid concerns of plurality.
  - 14 February – BT and Sky have agreed a £4.4bn three-year deal to show live Premiership football matches from 2019 to 2022, but the amount falls short of the £5.1bn deal struck in 2015.
  - 27 February – US cable TV giant Comcast makes a £22.1bn bid for Sky, challenging the existing offer from 21st Century Fox.
  - 1 March – Pick +1 returns to Freeview.
  - 6 August – Sky Living is rebranded as 'Sky Witness', bringing an end to the Living brand after 25 years.
  - 26 September – 21st Century Fox announces it would sell its 39% stake in Sky UK to Comcast, ending Rupert Murdoch's three decade association with the broadcaster.
- 2019
  - 1 January – Sky Sports Racing launches, replacing At The Races.
  - 1 October – Sky Crime launches. It replaces Real Lives.

== 2020s ==
- 2020
  - 27 January – Sky Comedy launches, replacing Universal TV.
  - 27 May –
    - Sky Documentaries and Sky Nature launch.
    - History and History 2, which operate as a joint venture between Sky and A&E Networks, are rebranded as Sky History and Sky History 2 respectively.
  - 1 June – Challenge +1 closes.
  - 23 July – Sky Cinema Animation launches. Sky Cinema Animation SD replaces Sky Cinema Premiere +1, while Sky Cinema Animation HD is a new channel.
  - 27 August – Sky Replay replaces Sky Two.
  - 17 September – Sky Arts launches on Freeview and Freesat, thereby becoming a free-to-air channel.
  - 30 December – Sky Cinema Disney closes. It is replaced with a temporary channel called Sky Cinema Five Star Movies.
- 2021
  - 6 January – Sky Cinema Premiere +1 resumes broadcasting as Sky Cinema Disney's permanent replacement.
  - 16 March – NOW TV to rebrand as NOW.
  - 1 September –
    - Sky One closes after more than 30 years on air. Its entertainment and drama programmes move to a new channel called Sky Max with its comedy programming moving to Sky Comedy.
    - Sky Showcase launches. It broadcasts a selection of programmes from across Sky’s portfolio of channels as well as selected highlights from Sky Cinema and Sky Sports.
  - 18 October – Sky releases Sky Glass, a TV with Sky built-in, thereby removing the need of a set-top-box or a satellite dish.
- 2022
  - 31 March –
    - Sky stops broadcasting channels in standard definition for the first time when it switches off the SD feed of three Sky Cinema channels - Comedy, Drama and Thriller.
    - The Pick and Syfy timeshift channels close.
  - 26 July – Syfy rebrands as Sky Sci-Fi.
  - 27 July – Sky Sports launches a UHD channel for Sky Sports Main Event.
  - 18 October – Sky launches its new streaming box, Sky Stream, and becomes the second way to receive Sky without in need of a satellite dish.
  - 31 October – Sky sells its stake in Nickelodeon UK Ltd. to Paramount Networks EMEAA. The Nickelodeon agreement had contained a non-compete clause that otherwise restricted Sky and Comcast from launching a children's television network while still holding a stake in Nickelodeon UK Ltd. Less than a month later, Sky announces plans to launch its own linear kids channel.
- 2023
  - 13 February – Sky Kids launches and is aimed at children aged 1–7. Apart from promos, the channel doesn't carry any advertisements.
  - 18 October – Pick rebrands as Sky Mix.
- 2024
  - 11 February – Sky Sports Tennis launches, beginning transmission shortly after Sky took over as rights holder to the ATP Tour, WTA Tour and the US Open.
  - 29 May – Sky closes standard definition feeds of its sports channels (with the exceptions of Sky Sports News and Sky Sports Mix) and four of its movie channels.
  - August – Sky Sports+ launches. This will allow Sky to show up to 100 events concurrently. Sky says that this will result in a 50% increase in the amount of sport that Sky will broadcast. A Sky Sports + linear channel will also be available.
- 2025
  - 30 October – Sky Replay closes at 6am.
- 2026
  - 24 February –
    - Sky One returns after a 4.5 year absence. It replaces Sky Max.
    - Sky Showcase, which had been used as a shop window for the entire Sky portfolio, closes.
  - 29 September – Sky History 2 rebrands as MysteryX.

== See also ==
- Timeline of Sky Cinema
- Timeline of Sky News
- Timeline of Sky One
- Timeline of Sky Sports
