= Timeline of Sky Sports =

This is a timeline of the history of Sky Sports.

== 1980s and 1990s ==
- 1989
  - 5 February – Sky Television launches at 6.00pm. The channel line-up consists of a sports channel but is a pan-European service called Eurosport rather than a Sky-branded UK channel.
- 1990
  - January–March – Sky shows live coverage of England's cricketing tour to the West Indies. This is the first time that full live coverage of an overseas tour has been shown in the UK. The coverage is broadcast on Sky One.
  - 11 February – Sky Movies broadcasts its first special event – the boxing fight between Mike Tyson and Buster Douglas, doing so six days after Sky Movies becomes the UK's first pay television channel. Sky Movies shows all of Sky's premium boxing fights until they transfer to Sky Sports after it becomes a pay channel in 1992.
  - 27 March – BSB launches and among the channel line-up is a sports service called The Sports Channel.
  - 2 November – Sky TV and BSB merge. The new company is called BSkyB. Two of BSB's five channels are closed immediately but The Sports Channel stays on air.
- 1991
  - January – The Sports Channel covers its first major tennis tournament since BSB and Sky merged when it broadcasts live coverage of the Australian Open. Sky Sports goes on to show the event until 1994.
  - 20 April – Sky Sports launches, replacing the BSB Sports Channel.
  - Spring – Sky Sports shows live coverage of the newly created World League of American Football. Channel 4 also covers the competition with a weekly Saturday morning highlights programme.
  - 6–22 May – Eurosport briefly closes after the competing Screensport channel had filed a complaint to the European Commission over its corporate structure. TF1 Group subsequently steps in and replaces BSkyB as Eurosport's joint owners.
  - 14–25 July – Sky Sports broadcasts full live coverage of the 1991 World Student Games, which are held in the UK. This is the only time that Sky has broadcast a multi-sport event.
  - 26 August – Sky begins its coverage of the US Open (tennis) tournament, beginning a relationship with the event which lasts until 2015.
- 1992
  - 22 February-25 March – Sky shows its first major cricket tournament when it broadcasts exclusive live coverage of the 1992 Cricket World Cup. This is the beginning of Sky's coverage of the event which continues to this day and is therefore the longest set of rights that Sky Sports holds.
  - 18 May – Sky purchases the live rights to the newly formed football Premier League for £304 million.
  - 15 August – Sky Sports launches Sports Saturday. The programme follows the same format as the BBC's Grandstand programme featuring a mix of sporting action, concluding with the day's football results.
  - 16 August – To mark the start of Sky Sports's coverage of the Premier League, the channel launches an afternoon-long football programme called Super Sunday. The first programme sees the first use of a score bug, a digital on-screen graphic displaying the current score. Initially only used for football coverage, it is soon extended to other sports coverage and is soon taken up by other broadcasters.
  - 17 August – Monday Night Football makes its debut on Sky Sports as part of Sky's deal to show Premier League matches on Monday evenings. This is the first time that domestic football has been shown in the UK on Monday evenings.
  - 31 August – Sky Sports broadcasts World Wrestling Federation's SummerSlam '92 in full.
  - 1 September – Sky Sports becomes a subscription channel.
  - Sky signs a deal with the newly formed World Darts Council, since renamed the Professional Darts Corporation (PDC), to broadcast three of its tournaments.
- 1993
  - Following the Split in darts, Sky stops covering BDO tournaments.
  - Sky begins providing live coverage of US PGA Golf.
  - 26 December – Sky Sports covers the first PDC World Darts Championship and has broadcast the event every year ever since.
- 1994
  - Sky Sports broadcasts a home cricket one-day international for the first time.
  - mid 1994 – Sky Sports acquires the rights to boxing fights promoted by Barry Hearn.
  - 1–8 August – Sky Sports broadcasts the first World Matchplay (darts). Sky continues to show this event to this day.
  - 19 August – Sky Sports 2 launches, initially as a weekend-only service.
  - 20 August – The first edition of Saturday morning football-based comedy/talk show Soccer AM is broadcast.
- 1995
  - January – Sky Sports acquires the rights to Frank Warren's Sports Network fights.
  - 8 April – After a three-year hiatus, the World League of American Football returns with live coverage being aired on Sky Sports.
  - September –
    - Sky begins showing a weekly game from the top division of England club rugby. This is the first time that a live match from domestic rugby union had been shown in the UK.
    - Sky Sports starts showing a weekly game from the British Basketball League.
    - Sky Sports start showing coverage from the NFL.
  - 22–24 September – Sky Sports becomes the exclusive broadcaster of golf's Ryder Cup and has shown the event exclusive live ever since.
  - 1 November – Sky Sports Gold launches. It broadcasts for three hours a night, three nights a week.
- 1996
  - Following an approach by Rupert Murdoch to British rugby league clubs to form a new Super League, the sport agrees to the proposals, which amongst other things sees the sport move from a winter to a summer season.
  - 16 March – The boxing match between Frank Bruno and Mike Tyson is the UK's first pay-per-view event.
  - June – Sky Sports increases its coverage of women's sport by broadcasting women's cricket and women's golf for the first time.
  - 16 August –
    - Sky Sports 3 launches. The new channel showcases the Football League, which Sky now holds the rights to. Sky Sports 3 also becomes the home to Sky's coverage of the Scottish Premier League. This is the first time that the SPL has been shown across the UK. The channel broadcasts part-time, from midday until midnight.
    - Sky Sports is renamed Sky Sports 1
    - Sky Sports Gold closes although some of its programmes continue to be shown for a while on the other Sky Sports channels.
  - 26 October – Sky's coverage of Major League Baseball ends after showing MLB for the past four years.
  - November – Sky Sports begins showing live coverage of the England national rugby union team, replacing the BBC which had held the right for many decades.
- 1997
  - 24 May – Sky Sports takes over as broadcaster of the British and Irish Lions when it shows full live coverage of the 1997 British Lions tour to South Africa. In addition to the test matches, Sky also broadcasts live coverage of the tour matches.
  - 1 September – Sky Sports 2 becomes a full-time service.
  - 28 October – Sky Sports takes over as broadcaster of greyhound racing's TV Trophy.
- 1998
  - February – Sky Sports broadcasts matches from the Six Nations championships for the first time as part of its contract to show England's rugby union games. It does so until 2001.
  - 15 August – On the first day of the 1998–99 football season, the first edition of Soccer Saturday is broadcast. The afternoon-long football scores and results service replaces Sports Saturday.
  - 1 October – Sky Digital launches and this is marked by the launch of the UK's first rolling sports news channel Sky Sports News.
  - 15 November – Rival digital television service OnDigital launches. Sky had originally been a partner in the venture but was forced to pull out by the Independent Television Commission. However, some Sky channels, including two Sky Sports channels (Sky Sports 1 and Sky Sports 3 – Sky Sports 2 is added later – do appear on the service.
- 1999
  - April – Sky Sports launches its interactive service Sky Sports Active.
  - Sky Sports broadcasts a home cricket Test Match live for the first time as part of a joint deal with Channel 4. This arrangement continues until 2005.
  - 22 August – Sky Sports Xtra launches, initially primarily as an interactive service.
  - Sunday Supplement launches, providing a Sunday morning discussion of the previous day's football.
  - Sky Sports increases its coverage of greyhound racing and shows major events on Tuesday nights, including the Springbok and the Grand National.

== 2000s ==
- 2000
  - 10 April – Sky Sports News is renamed Sky Sports.com TV.
  - Goals on Sunday launches.
  - October – Sky Sports covers the Rugby League World Cup for the first time, sharing the rights with the BBC.
- 2001
  - Sky's exclusive live coverage of the England football team ends following the rights transferring to the BBC. Sky had held the rights since the days of BSB's Sports Channel.
  - May – Sky loses the rights to the British Basketball League to ITV.
  - 1 July – The Sky Sports.com TV brand is scrapped and the channel reverts to its original name of Sky Sports News.
  - 18 August – PremPlus launches. The channel's is the home to Sky's venture into pay-per-view football.
- 2002
  - 1 March – F1 Digital+ launches. It offers enhanced multi-screen coverage of Formula One on a pay-per-view basis.
  - May – Sky Sports' coverage of the Scottish Premier League ends after four seasons.
  - 4–7 July – Sky Sports shows the first edition of a new overseas darts tournament, the Las Vegas Desert Classic. Sky continues to show the event until it ends in 2009.
  - August – Coverage of the Football League reverts to Sky Sports after one season with ITV, which the broadcaster had intended would kick-start the ITV Sport Channel which failed due to the massive price that ITV had paid for the rights.
  - Following the collapse on ITV Digital, Sky Sports takes over as broadcaster of tennis’ ATP tour.
  - 30 October – Sky Sports News begins broadcasting on the new Freeview platform.
  - 12 December – After just one season, F1 Digital+ closes.
- 2003
  - 30 May-3 June – Sky Sports shows the first edition of darts' UK Open. Sky continues to show the event until 2013.
  - Sky Sports shows games from the UEFA Champions League for the first time.
  - 22 October – Sky becomes the new broadcaster of rugby union's European clubs tournament Heineken Cup.
- 2004
  - 11 June – At the Races relaunches as a stand-alone venture. Between 2000 and 2003 the channel had been on air in conjunction with Channel 4.
  - August – Football First launches. The programme allows viewers to choose the game they want to watch.
- 2005
  - 8 January – Premier League Snooker is relaunched with Sky Sports being the broadcaster of the event, which takes place over a four-month period.
  - 20 January – Sky Sports shows the first night of a new tournament Premier League Darts. The League is a new format and is played over a number of one-off nights, generally every Thursday. Sky continues to show the event to this day.
- 2006
  - Sky Sports becomes the exclusive broadcaster of all live cricket matches in the UK following the ECB awarding Sky exclusive coverage of all of England's home tests, one-day internationals and Twenty20 Internationals.
  - May – The first edition of Cricket AM is broadcast on Sky Sports and Sky One. Based on its successful football-related counterpart Soccer AM, it broadcasts during the footballing off-season.
  - 22 May – Sky launches its high definition service when Sky One HD and Sky Sports 1 HD being broadcasting.
  - July – Sky Sports 2HD launches.
  - August – The European Union objects to what it saw as a monopoly on television football rights and demands the 2007 contract be split into separate packages of 23 games. Consequently, Sky wins four of the six available packages, with the other two are taken by Setanta Sports.
  - Sky starts showing weekly ice hockey game from the Elite Ice Hockey League.
  - December – Sky's 13 years of covering golf's PGA Tour ends due to Setanta Sports winning the rights to coverage of the tour from the start of 2007.
- 2007
  - 6 May – PremPlus closes.
  - May – After 15 seasons, Monday Night Football ends its first run due to Sky losing the rights to Monday evening Premiership matches to Setanta Sports.
- 2008
  - 17 March – Sky Sports 3HD launches.
  - 17 May – Sky Sports shows FA Cup football for the final time, having covered the competition since BSB's Sports Channel launched in 1990.
  - 6 September – Sky Sports picks up the rights to Frank Warren's Sports Network from ITV.
  - 22 November – Sky Sports' coverage of the Rugby League World Cup ends as the rights for future tournaments move to Premier Sports.
- 2009
  - Sky's coverage of the top division of England club rugby ends when the rights transfer to the new ESPN channel.

== 2010s ==
- 2010
  - 6 January – Sky Sports Xtra is renamed Sky Sports 4.
  - January – Sky Sports regains the rights to golf's PGA Tour.
  - 3 April – Sky 3D launches, initially as a commercial channel. The first event to be shown is a football match. Residential customers get access to the channel on 1 October.
  - 29 April – Sky Sports 4HD launches.
  - June – Sky Sports Radio launches.
  - August – Monday Night Football returns after Sky regains the rights to Monday night Premier League games.
  - 23 August – Sky Sports News stops broadcasting on Freeview and a HD version of the channel is launched.
  - The British Basketball League returns to Sky Sports after a 9-year gap and broadcasts the league for the next three seasons.
- 2011
  - 28–30 January – Sky Sports broadcasts the first Snooker Shoot Out. Sky shows the event until 2015.
  - 7–10 April – Sky Sports shows coverage of golf's Masters Tournament for the first time. It shows the first two rounds exclusively live and shares coverage of rounds 3 and 4 with the BBC.
- 2012
  - 9 March – Sky Sports F1 launches following the purchase of coverage of every race of the Formula One. Around half of the races are to be shown exclusively by Sky Sports. This is Sky's first full-time channel dedicated to a single sport.
  - Sky Sports increases its coverage of motorsport when it starts to broadcast FIA Formula 2 Championship (previously known as GP2) and FIA Formula 3 Championship on Sky Sports F1.
  - Sky Sports broadcasts games from rugby league's Challenge Cup for the first time.
  - 7 August – Sky Sports broadcasts the FA Community Shield for the final time, having screened the event since 1990.
  - Due to poor viewing figures, Sky Sports decides to stop showing FIM World Speedway. Eurosport replaces Sky Sports, who had been the rights holder for over a decade.
- 2013
  - 6–9 June – Sky Sports broadcasts darts' UK Open for the final time.
  - 30 June – Sky Sports launches its first temporary channel Sky Sports Ashes to provide full coverage of the 2013 Ashes Series. Temporary channel renames of this nature is now common practice within Sky, both for sports and movies.
  - August – Cricket AM is broadcast for the final time.
- 2014
  - 2 April – Sky Sports signs a deal with the Gaelic Athletic Association (GAA) to broadcast fixtures from both the All-Ireland Senior Football Championship and the All-Ireland Senior Hurling Championship.
  - 12 August –
    - Sky Sports 5 launches, primarily to broadcast European football.
    - Sky Sports News is rebranded Sky Sports News HQ.
  - September – Sky Sports News Radio closes.
  - Sky loses the rights to darts’ UK Open to ITV.
  - December – Sky Sports Darts appears for the first time. It broadcasts for the duration of the PDC World Darts Championship. The channel, which temporarily replaces Sky Sports 3, mixes live coverage with replays of the most recent sessions and classic moments from the tournament's history.
- 2015
  - February – Sky Sports takes over as broadcaster of cricket's Indian Premier League.
  - 6 June – After 12 seasons, Sky Sport's broadcasting of the UEFA Champions League ends when it shows coverage of the 2015 UEFA Champions League Final.
  - 9 June – Sky 3D closes as a linear channel.
  - Sky Sports secures live coverage of NBC's Sunday Night Football coverage and ESPN's Monday Night Football, giving Sky live rights to every NFL game during the season for the first time.
  - September – Sky Sports shows coverage of the US Open (tennis) for the final time, having shown the event every year since 1991. It had decided not to bid for the rights to the 2016 tournament.
  - November – After 20 seasons on air, the final edition of rugby league magazine Boots 'N' All is broadcast.
  - Sky starts showing live coverage of Major League Soccer.
- 2016
  - 13 August – Sky Sports broadcasts its first event in UHD.
  - 24 August – Sky Sports Mix launches. It is available to all Sky customers, and is designed to offer a sampling of content from the full range of Sky Sports networks to non-Sky Sports customers.
  - BT Sport takes over from Sky Sports as broadcaster of Australia's home matches for five years. This means that BT will show The Ashes series between England and Australia in 2017-18 with the deal also including the Big Bash League, the Women's Ashes and the Women's Big Bash League.
  - 27 November – Sky Sports announces a deal to bring extensive coverage of netball to TV screens. It shows the coverage on its non-premium channel Sky Sports Mix.
  - After more than 20 years, Sky's coverage of British Speedway ends. The rights move to BT Sport.
- 2017
  - 18 July – Sky Sports is revamped with the numbered channels being replaced by sports-specific channels. These include two channels dedicated to football, a cricket channel and a golf channel. Other sports are moved to two new channels – Action and Arena – and a showcase channel called Sky Sports Main Event is launched which features simulcasts of the top events being shown on Sky Sports that day. Also, Sky Sports News drops the HQ label.
  - 3–6 August – Sky Sports replaces the BBC as live broadcaster of golf's Women's British Open.
  - 10 August-1 September – Sky Sports broadcasts eight matches live from the 2017 Women's Cricket Super League. This marks Sky’s first major foray into women’s cricket. Sky expands its coverage the following year, showing 12 matches from the 2018 event.
  - Sky shows five matches a season from the NIFL Premiership.
- 2018
  - 14 February – BT and Sky have agreed a £4.4bn three-year deal to show live Premiership football matches from 2019 to 2022, but the amount falls short of the £5.1bn deal struck in 2015.
  - 12 May – Sky's coverage of the European Rugby Champions Cup ends after 15 years of coverage of the event when the rights to the tournament transfer to BT Sport. It also loses its coverage of the Pro14 competition to Premier Sports.
  - May – Sky's 20+ years of coverage of La Liga ends when the rights transfer to Eleven Sports. It also loses its rights to the Eredivise and the Chinese Super League to the new channel.
  - 8 August – Sky Sports takes over from BT Sport as broadcaster of cricket's Caribbean Premier League.
  - 6 September – Apart from England's home matches, Sky Sports is the exclusive broadcaster of football's new UEFA Nations League tournament.
  - September – Sky Sports resumes covering the NBA after a decade on other networks.
  - December – Sky Sports ends its coverage of tennis after more than 25 years when its rights to the ATP Tour transfer Amazon Prime.
- 2019
  - 1 January – Sky Sports Racing launches, replacing At The Races.
  - January – Basketball's NBA returns to Sky Sports after a decade with ESPN and BT Sport.
  - February – Sky Sports announces a deal with Bellator MMA to broadcast mixed martial arts events.
  - 17 March – Sky Sports becomes the exclusive broadcaster of all Formula One races, apart from the British Grand Prix.
  - 20 June – U.S. professional wrestling promotion WWE announces that its programming would move to BT Sport beginning in 2020, ending a relationship that dated back to Sky's launch in 1989.

== 2020s ==
- 2020
  - June – With the resumption of play in the 2019–20 Premier League due to the Coronavirus pandemic in the United Kingdom, the Premier League announces that it will show all remaining matches on British television, split primarily across Sky, BT, and Amazon. A large number of these matches are scheduled for free-to-air broadcasts, with Sky airing 25 on Pick.
  - 1 August – Sky Sports becomes the exclusive broadcaster of live coverage of the Scottish Professional Football League. In recent seasons Sky had shared the rights with BT Sport.
  - 6 August – Sky announces that Sunday Supplement will not be returning for the 2020/21 season.
  - 3 September – Sky Sports NFL launches. It is an in-season rebrand of Sky Sports Action and provides round-the clock coverage of the NFL. As well as live and recorded coverage of games, output includes simulcasts of magazine shows from NFL Network such as Good Morning Football and NFL Total Access. The channel broadcasts until early February 2021.
  - 8 September – It is announced that all of September's Premier League fixtures will be shown on TV due to fans not being into stadiums due to the Coronavirus pandemic. Sky shows six of the eleven extra TV games.
  - 9 October – The Premier League announces that October's games not scheduled for TV broadcast will be shown on a pay-per-view basis on either Sky Sports Box Office or BT Sport Box Office.
  - 13 November – The Premier League confirms that the broadcasting of matches via pay-per-view will end and that all games in December and January will be shown by either Sky Sports and BT Sport with one game also being shown on both Amazon Prime and the BBC.
  - 3 December – The British Basketball League returns to Sky Sports. The broadcaster shows 30 games per season. The deal also sees Sky broadcasting matches from the Women's British Basketball League.
- 2021
  - April – Sky begins showing Extreme E motor racing.
  - 7 May – Sky Sports ends a decade of coverage of the Challenge Cup when it shows two quarter-finals from the 2021 Challenge Cup.
  - 13 May – The Premier League announces that, for the first time, the next three-year broadcasting contact has been awarded without a bidding process. Consequently, Sky Sports is paying the same amount for the same packages it was awarded for the 2019-2022 contact.
  - June –
    - After more than 25 years with Sky Sports, fights promoted by Matchroom Sport stop being shown on Sky Sports. These fights move to streaming service DAZN.
    - To ensure boxing continues on Sky Sports, Sky announces two new boxing contracts, with Top Rank for American and international boxing, and with BOXXER in the UK. The first event from Sky's new deal with Top Rank takes place on 12 June.
  - 13 August – Sky Sports replaces BT Sport as broadcaster of Germany's Bundesliga and Supercup.
  - 3 September – Sky Sports replaces BT Sport as the pay-TV broadcast partner of the FA Women's Super League. Sky will show two fixtures per round - a total of 44 games/season - with some matches simulcast on Sky One, and the BBC will show one fixture of which 18 of their 22 games will be on BBC One or BBC Two.
- 2022
  - 9 January – 6 February – Sky Sports and the BBC share coverage of the African Cup of Nations with Sky Sports showing most of the games live.
  - March – Sky Sports' coverage of the UEFA Nations League ends when the rights transfer to Premier Sports.
  - 27 July – Sky Sports launches a UHD channel for Sky Sports Main Event.
  - September – Sky Sports begins showing coverage of Notre Dame home matches. This is the first time that Sky Sports has shown live coverage of the NCAA.
  - 24 October – Sky Sports and the GAA announce a mutual agreement to end their broadcast partnership after nine years. The rights transfer to the BBC.
- 2023
  - 10 January – Sky Sports begins showing South Africa’s new T20 cricket league.
  - 27 May – Soccer AM ends after 28 years.
  - 12 June – Sky Sports's coverage of the NBA ends ahead of a later announcement that TNT Sports will take over the rights to show NBA in the UK from the 2023–24 NBA season onwards.
  - 28 August – Sky Sports returns to the broadcasting of tennis when it begins a new five-year deal to broadcast the US Open.
  - 18 November – Following an agreement with ESPN, Sky Sports starts showing three College Football games a week plus the Bowl season and ESPN's pre-game show College Gameday. The deal also includes the 2024 College football season.
  - November - As part of the aforementioned deal with ESPN, Sky Sports will show three College Basketball matches each week.
- 2024
  - January – Coverage of the ATP Tour returns to Sky Sports, having been with Amazon Prime for the previous five years.
  - 11 February – Sky Sports launches a full time tennis channel, Sky Sports Tennis.
  - 19 March-8 April – Sky Sports shows coverage of College Basketball's March Madness tournament for the first time. However, Sky will only show this event once more as the rights to the NCAA pass to DAZN from the 2025/26 season.
  - 29 May – Sky closes its standard definition feeds of Sky Sports.
  - 8 August – Sky Sports+ launches. The channel acts as an overspill service on linear TV, and replaces Sky Sports Arena. However, it is a gateway to show up to 100 events concurrently. Sky says that this will result in a 50% increase in the amount of sport that Sky will broadcast. A Sky Sports + linear channel will also be available.
  - 9-11 August – Sky Sports live streams every match of the opening weekend of the 2024/25 EFL season live, including the games scheduled for 3pm.
- 2025
  - 9 June – It is revealed that Sky Sports won't be renewing its broadcast deal with BOXXER.
  - 21 October – Coverage of the NBA returns to Sky Sports.
- 2026
- 2027
  - September – Sky Sports begins showing live coverage of the UEFA Europa League and UEFA Conference League. The deal will see Sky broadcast 342 matches each season.

== See also ==
- Timeline of Sky Group
