= Timeline of boxing on UK television =

Overview of boxing broadcast on British television

This is a timeline of the history of boxing on television in the UK.

== 1930s to 1980s ==
- 1938
  - Eric Boon vs Arthur Danahar from the Harringay Arena is the UK's first televised boxing match, broadcast on BBC television and shown live in several cinemas.
- 1955
  - 22 September – ITV is launched, although initially only in London, and boxing is part of the launch night's programmes.
- 1966
  - 21 May – The fight between Muhammad Ali vs. Henry Cooper II is shown on pay-per-view closed-circuit television at 16 Odeon Cinemas across the UK.
- 1984
  - ITV obtains the rights to show boxing fights promoted by Frank Warren's Sports Network and later in the decade ITV signs a deal to with Barry Hearn. This deal marks ITV's first major step into covering British boxing as previously most of ITV's coverage had been fights from the US. ITV launches a new programme to cover the sport - The Big Fight Live. ITV also introduces a supplementary programme Fight Night, which shows midweek recorded coverage of non-premium boxing action.

== 1990s ==
- 1990
  - 11 February – Sky broadcasts its first non-free to air sports event when it shows the boxing fight between Mike Tyson and Buster Douglas. It broadcast the event on Sky Movies, doing so six days after Sky Movies becomes the UK's first pay television channel. Sky Movies shows all of Sky's premium boxing fights until they transfer to Sky Sports after it becomes a pay channel in 1992.
- 1991
  - No events.
- 1992
  - 1 September – Sky Sports becomes a subscription channel and consequently, Sky's coverage of boxing fully transfers to Sky Sports.
- 1993
  - No events.
- 1994
  - mid 1994 – ITV loses the rights to Sky Sports of boxing fights promoted by Barry Hearn.
  - Short-lived cable station Wire TV make a push into sports broadcasting and broadcasts Lennox Lewis's WBC 1994 title fights.
- 1995
  - January – ITV loses rights to Frank Warren's Sports Network fights to Sky Sports.
  - October – ITV resumes its coverage of boxing, albeit for lower profile fights.
- 1996
  - 16 March – The fight between Frank Bruno and Mike Tyson is the UK's first television pay-per-view event.
- 1997
  - The BBC steps further back from showing professional boxing following the end of its midweek sports programme Sportsnight which had shown boxing, often live, throughout its time on air. The BBC had shown less boxing for the past few years as more fights had transferred to ITV and Sky Sports.
- 1998
  - December – ITV launches a fortnightly boxing magazine programme Boxing First. It is shown on its new channel ITV2. The show transfers to ITV Sport Channel in 2001 and ends shortly after.
- 1999
  - No events.

== 2000s ==
- 2000
  - No events.
- 2001
  - 22 April – The BBC makes a return to showing professional time boxing when it shows the Lennox Lewis vs. Hasim Rahman fight. The BBC continues to show fights on a ad hoc basis for the next couple of years before deciding just to show boxing in multi-sport events such as the Olympic Games and Commonwealth Games.
- 2002
  - No events.
- 2003
  - No events.
- 2004
  - No events.
- 2005
  - 4 March – The BBC ends its brief return to live professional boxing when it shows Clinton Woods winning the IBF light-heavyweight title.
  - June – Following a successful one-off return to boxing in May, ITV decides to return to the sport on a regular basis when it re-captures the rights to Frank Warren's Sports Network promotions.
- 2006
  - No events.
- 2007
  - September – Frank Warren's Sports Network promotions moves, for the most part, to Setanta Sports although fights involving Amir Khan continue to be shown on ITV.
- 2008
  - 27 May – Hayemaker Promotions signs a deal with Setanta Sports to show ten promotions. This would include the next four David Haye fights. Only three were shown before Setanta went into liquidation the following year.
  - 6 September – ITV loses the rights to Frank Warren’s Sports Network to Sky but it does continue to broadcast boxing when it a signs a 2-year, 26-fight deal with Hennessy Sports.
- 2009
  - July – Hatton Promotions signs a deal with Sky Sports to broadcast eight shows.
  - 17 October – Pay-per-view channel Primetime launches when it shows pay-per-view coverage of the Super Six World Boxing Classic.

== 2010s ==
- 2010
  - ITV decides to drop its coverage of boxing on the grounds that it considers the sport to be no longer financially viable.
  - September – Premier Sports begins to show boxing and over the next year, it does deals with Hennessy Sports, AIBI for the World Series of Boxing, ShoBox: The New Generation events in 2011, Top Rank for eight events in 2011–2012 and Spencer Fearon's Hard Knocks Boxing Promotions for six events from York Hall.
- 2011
  - Primetime begins showing events from Golden Boy Promotions and Top Rank, doing so for the next couple of years.
  - 14 July – BoxNation launches. Initially broadcast free-to-air, the channel becomes a monthly subscription service on 1 December.
- 2012
  - No events.
- 2013
  - No events.
- 2014
  - 8 February – BoxNation begins broadcasting in high definition.
- 2015
  - No events.
- 2016
  - 6 January – Dave shows boxing for the first time when it teams up with David Haye to show his fight with Mark de Mori at the O2 Arena on 16 January.
- 2017
  - 4 February – Following ITV's return to covering live boxing, the channel launches a pay-per-view channel ITV Box Office.
  - 8 April – BT Sport starts showing boxing following a deal with Frank Warren Promotions.
  - 9 September – ITV begins showing the inaugural World Boxing Super Series tournament. ITV broadcasts the fights on ITV Box Office.
- 2018
  - 15 September – BT Sport launches its pay-per-view channel BT Sport Box Office, mainly to show boxing pay-per-view events.
  - December – ITV and Al Haymon’s Premier Boxing Champions sign a three-year agreement which will see at least 15 events being shown on ITV Box Office and ITV4.
- 2019
  - April – Sky Sports airs nine fights of the World Boxing Super Series (WBSS) in the 2018–19 season starting with the semi-final world title bouts, ending in November with the bantamweight final between Nonito Donaire and Naoya Inoue.

== 2020s ==
- 2020
  - 24 January – ITV announces that it has closed its pay-per-view service ITV Box Office. ITV had used this to show its recent, brief, return to broadcasting boxing.
- 2021
  - June –
    - After more than 25 years with Sky Sports, fights promoted by Matchroom Sport stop being shown on Sky Sports. These fights move to streaming service DAZN.
    - To ensure boxing continues on Sky Sports, Sky announces two new boxing contracts, with Top Rank for American and international boxing, and with BOXXER in the UK. The first event from Sky's new deal with Top Rank takes place on 12 June.
- 2022
  - 2 March – Wasserman Boxing and Channel 5 announce a deal which will see Channel 5 air five fight nights Wasserman Boxing-promoted fight nights during 2022.
  - 4 June – The BBC broadcasts live professional boxing for the first time since 2005 when BBC Wales and BBC iPlayer shows two Welsh title fights.
  - 15 December – The BoxNation TV channel closes after eleven years on air.
- 2023
  - 18 July – TNT Sports launches, replacing BT Sport. It carries the same line-up of programming and sports coverage as BT Sport had done, which, for boxing, are the rights to Queensberry Boxing promotions.
- 2024
  - No events.
- 2025
  - April – DAZN replaces TNT Sports as the rights holder to fights promoted by Queensberry Boxing, bringing up to 150 fights a year to the streaming platform.
  - 9 June – It is revealed that Sky Sports won't be renewing its broadcast deal with BOXXER.
  - 8 August – It is announced that BOXXER has signed a deal with BBC Sport. BOXXER's pay-per-view fights will be broadcast via streaming platform DAZN.
  - 29 November – The BBC's deal with BOXXER begins on this day, and this is the first time in more than 20 years that the BBC has shown professional boxing.
- 2026
  - After a short time out of the ring, Sky Sports resumes its coverage of boxing following a deal with Zuffa Boxing.
  - 20 June – DAZN launches Saturday Fight Night, a weekly programme showing live boxing, including DAZN's pay-pre-view events, which will run all year round.
