= The Big Fight Live =

- Presented by: Jim Rosenthal (1984-2010); Mark Pougatch (2017-)
- Starring: Barry McGuigan (1984-2010)
- Opening theme: "Drive to the Boatyard" by Ilan Eshkeri
- Country of origin: United Kingdom

Production
- Running time: Variable

Original release
- Network: ITV; ITV4; ITV Box Office
- Release: 1984–1995; 2005–2010; 2017–present

The Big Fight Live is a British boxing television programme, broadcast by ITV Sport regularly from 1984 to 1995 and again from 2005 to 2010. In 2017, ITV announced that 'The Big Fight Live' would return after it was announced Chris Eubank Jr. would fight for the world title on ITV Box Office. ITV has not covered boxing since the closure of ITV Box Office at the start of 2020.

== History ==
ITV's boxing coverage had largely been confined to big fights from the US in the 1970s and early 80s, which were covered as part of World of Sport and as separate programmes. Until 1984, they were largely shut out of British domestic boxing due to a cartel operated by promoters such as Jarvis Astaire, Harry Levene and Mickey Duff, who had contracts with the BBC.

ITV obtained the rights to show fights promoted by then-rebel promoter Frank Warren's Sports Network in 1984. Several years later, a contract with Barry Hearn followed as a result of his friendship with Greg Dyke, while the network also worked closely with other promoters including Don King. Until the early 1990s, the programmes were titled Boxing, World Championship Boxing, "The Big Fight Live" (a name occasionally used in the 1980s) or shown as part of Midweek Sport Special. Until 1985, boxing continued to be shown on World of Sport, before the programme was axed.

In the early 1990s, most boxing on ITV was branded The Big Fight Live. The exceptions to this were programmes on regional ITV, which used a variety of names, with Fight Night and Seconds Out being among the names used in some regions, while some overnight highlights programmes featuring less well-known or non-British fighters still used the World Championship Boxing title. During the 1980s, "Fight Night" promoted the careers of boxers like Errol Christie, whose fights featured on ITV and not the rival BBC. However, "The Big Fight Live" or "The Big Fight" (for highlights programmes), featuring its bright yellow and black branding and its dramatic theme tune became the consistent brand used for all of ITV's main network boxing coverage. This was a particularly fruitful period for ITV's boxing coverage, as they featured fights involving boxers such as Nigel Benn, Chris Eubank and Naseem Hamed. These were produced by LWT for the ITV Network, and drew large audiences.

The decline of ITV's boxing portfolio began in mid-1994 when Barry Hearn took Chris Eubank and his stable of fighters to Sky Sports. At the start of 1996, Sky Sports won the rights to show Sports Network (Frank Warren promoted) fights, leaving ITV with only occasional boxing for the following ten years. Their only networked boxing during this period were a few fights involving Shea Neary, thanks to a contract with Merseyside promoter John Hyland. Other bouts were shown on ITV2 and the ITV Sport Channel, while ITV2 also ran a fortnightly magazine show called "Boxing First". This was presented by Russ Williams with Steve Bunce as a regular studio pundit, and other studio guests. The programme featured highlights of fights not shown live on UK television, as well as features. Other boxing was shown on a regional basis, but this was rare.

In May 2005, ITV returned to the ring, with live coverage of Amir Khan's last fight before becoming professional against Mario Kindelán. It achieved a peak audience of 6.3 million viewers, encouraging ITV to reach a long-term agreement to show future Sports Network boxing promotions.

In June 2005, the network won back the rights to show Frank Warren's Sports Network fights and as a result broadcast fights involving Amir Khan, Joe Calzaghe, Danny Williams, Audley Harrison and others. As of September 2007, their coverage of Sports Network promotions was shared with Setanta Sports, with only Amir Khan fights remaining with ITV.

On 6 September 2008, Amir Khan switched to Sky from ITV, signalling the end of the network's contract with Frank Warren's Sports Network. Later that month, ITV announced a 2-year deal with Hennessy Sports for coverage of 26 fights. The majority of fights were due to be screened on ITV4 and once again were to be hosted by Jim Rosenthal, who returned to ITV having previously been sacked in early 2008.

Amir Khan moved back to ITV in 2010, with his fight against Paulie Malignaggi broadcast live in the early hours of Sunday 15 May 2010. It also broadcast delayed coverage of at least one Carl Froch fight in America the night after it took place around this period, along with a number of other matches Shortly afterwards, ITV stopped screening any boxing coverage, believing it not to be commercially viable.

== Presentation ==
The main host of ITV Boxing was Jim Rosenthal, who returned to the programme after presenting ITV's Formula One coverage from 1997, on its return in 2005. Barry McGuigan left Sky Sports in 2005 to continue his role as a pundit on ITV. Commentary was provided by John Rawling and Duke McKenzie. Gabriel Clarke provided reports and interviews with the boxers. The main event was usually shown on the ITV Network while undercard matches were often televised on ITV4. Before 1996, the main commentators had been Reg Gutteridge and Jim Watt, both of whom moved to Sky while continuing to commentate for the few boxing shows ITV televised in the late 1990s, which were presented by Russ Williams. Graham Beecroft and Nick Halling commentated on boxing on a regional basis during the late 1990s, while Halling was also the commentator on Boxing First.

== 2015 Onwards ==
In 2015, ITV started screening live boxing matches once again beginning with Carl Frampton's fight against Chris Avalos.

On 13 December 2016, ITV announced that Chris Eubank Jr. would fight for the IBO World Championship live on a new pay-per-view channel called ITV Box Office under 'The Big Fight Live' name, bringing an end to the 7-year hiatus of the programme not being on TV.

In December 2018, ITV announced a ground-breaking new deal with Haymon Sports and Premier Boxing Champions (PBC) to bring exclusive coverage of PBC world-class boxing events to ITV.

The collaboration was the first time that Haymon Sports and PBC has partnered with a UK broadcaster to stage boxing events regularly in the UK. The exclusive three-year deal guarantees a minimum of 15 televised events each year, to be shown free on ITV, ITV4 and as pay-per-view events on ITV Box Office.

The first programme of the new deal was the IBF Super Middleweight title fight between Jose Uzcategui and Caleb Plant in the early hours of Monday 14 January 2019, UK time, which was broadcast live on ITV4. Plant, the challenger, won the fight on points. ITV took the feed from host broadcaster Fox Sports and Ronald McIntosh provided voiceovers for UK viewers when the host broadcaster was on commercial breaks.

== Fight Night ==
Fight Night was a long-running companion boxing programme which broadcast lower profile fights. Aired midweek, the action was pre-recorded rather than live. During the 1980s, it promoted the careers of boxers like Errol Christie whose fights featured on ITV and not the rival BBC.

== See also ==
- ITV Box Office
- Sky Box Office
- BT Sport Box Office
- Primetime (TV channel)
- BoxNation
