= Timeline of Sky Cinema =

This is a timeline of the history of Sky Cinema.

== 1980s ==
- 1988
  - 8 June – Rupert Murdoch announces plans to launch a four-channel service on the soon to be launched Astra satellite. The new service will include a movies channel.
- 1989
  - 5 February – Sky Television, and Sky Movies, launches at 6.00pm. After a brief introduction to the world of Sky, the channel shows its first film - Project X.
  - 3 June – Sky and The Walt Disney Company come to an arrangement which allows to broadcast movies for a five-year period. This agreement comes a few weeks after plans to create a full-time Disney-branded channel are scrapped, although a Disney-branded version eventually launched on 1 October 1995.

== 1990s ==
- 1990
  - 5 February – Sky Movies is fully encrypted, thereby becoming Sky's first pay channel.
  - 11 February – Sky Movies broadcasts its first special event – the boxing fight between Mike Tyson and Buster Douglas.
  - 25 March – BSB launches and its line-up includes The Movie Channel.
  - 1 September – Sky Movies begins broadcasting 24 hours a day. Previously the channel had aired shopping programmes between 6am and 2pm.
  - 2 November – Sky TV and BSB merge. The new company is called British Sky Broadcasting.
- 1991
  - 8 April – At 6.00am, Sky Movies launches on the Marcopolo satellite, replacing The Power Station.
  - 15 April — The Movie Channel launches on Astra 1B satellite at 8pm UK time with the first showing of 1989's Indiana Jones and the Last Crusade.
  - 6 May — The Movie Channel begins broadcasting 24 hours a day. Previously the channel had been on air from early afternoon until the early hours of the next morning.
- 1992
  - 1 September – Following Sky Sports becoming an encrypted channel, Sky Movies stops showing non-movies content. It had aired selected premium content such as live boxing, music concerts and World Wrestling Federation due to it having been Sky's only encrypted channel. During this period the channel had been known as Sky Movies Plus.
  - 1 October – Sky Movies Gold, a "classic movies" service, launches as part of the Sky Movies package and broadcasts from 6.00pm (4pm at the weekend) until midnight.
  - 31 December – Sky - and the two Sky Movies channels - stop broadcasting via the Marcopolo satellite.
- 1993
  - 1 February – BSkyB introduces a new system of film ratings often used for various times, replacing the British Board of Film Classification certificates.
- 1994
  - No events.
- 1995
  - 1 October – Sky Movies Gold starts sharing its transponder space with The Disney Channel resulting in the channel's broadcast hours changing to 10.00pm to 6.00am.
- 1996
  - No events.
- 1997
  - 1 November – Sky Movies and The Movie Channel are rebranded under the Sky Movies Screen banner and are now called Sky Movies Screen 1 and Sky Movies Screen 2.
  - 1 December – Sky Box Office launches a four-channel near on-demand movies service.
- 1998
  - 10 September – Sky Movies Screen 1 becomes Sky MovieMax, Sky Movies Screen 2 becomes Sky Premier, and Sky Movies Gold is renamed Sky Cinema.
  - 1 October – Sky Digital launches and Sky Movies launches seven more channels and many more Sky Movies Box Office channels start broadcasting.
  - 15 November – Rival digital television service ONdigital launches and two Sky Movies channels launch on the service.
- 1999
  - 1 October – Sky MovieMax 5 launches.

== 2000s ==
- 2000
  - No events.
- 2001
  - No events.
- 2002
  - 1 May – ITV Digital stops broadcasting. Consequently, the two Sky Movies channels which had been available on the service are no longer available via digital terrestrial television.
  - 1 July – In another major rebranding of Sky Movies, the Sky Premier channels are renamed Sky Movies Premier, the Sky Moviemax channels become Sky Movies Max and the Sky Cinema channels become Sky Movies Cinema.
- 2003
  - June – The Sky Movies Premier Widescreen channel is closed and the majority of films on the remaining channels are now shown in widescreen.
  - 1 November – The Sky Movies Premier and Sky Movies Max channels are brought under one banner as Sky Movies 1 through 9 and Sky Movies Cinema 1 and 2 become Sky Cinema 1 and 2.
- 2004
  - 29 February – Sky becomes the exclusive broadcaster of the Oscars. Previously, the event had alternated between Sky and the BBC.
- 2005
  - No events.
- 2006
  - 30 January – A tenth Sky Movies channel is launched and Sky Movies starts broadcasting two HD channels. Sky Movies 9 and the new Sky Movies 10 are PIN-protected, meaning that for the first time 15 rated films were able to be shown as early as 5.00pm.
- 2007
  - 4 April – Sky Movies is revamped with each channel now covering a specific genre and are renamed. The new line-up is Sky Movies Premiere, Sky Movies Premiere +1, Sky Movies Comedy, Sky Movies Action & Thriller, Sky Movies Family, Sky Movies Drama, Sky Movies Sci-Fi & Horror, Sky Movies Classics, Sky Movies Modern Greats, Sky Movies Indie, Sky Movies HD1 and Sky Movies HD2.
- 2008
  - February – Sky Movies HD1 and HD2 are renamed Sky Movies Screen 1 and Screen 2 in February 2008, and the HDTV channels are renamed Sky Movies Screen 1 HD and Screen 2 HD accordingly.
  - 20 March – A HD simulcast of Sky Movies Premiere is launched.
  - October – High-definition simulcast channels of Sky Movies Action/Thriller, Sky Movies Sci-Fi/Horror, Sky Movies Drama, Sky Movies Modern Greats, Sky Movies Family and Sky Movies Comedy launch.
- 2009
  - 26 October – Sky Movies Indie HD launches.

== 2010s ==
- 2010
  - 26 March – Some Sky Movies channels are renamed. Sky Movies Showcase replaces Sky Movies Screen 1, Sky Movies Action & Thriller is renamed Sky Movies Action & Adventure, Sky Movies Drama becomes Sky Movies Drama & Romance and Sky Movies Screen 2 becomes Sky Movies Crime & Thriller.
  - 2 August – The Sky Movies HD channels launch on the Virgin Media platform.
  - 9 August – Sky Movies Classics HD launches, exclusively on the sky platform.
- 2011
  - 4 October – Sky Movies Classics HD launches on Virgin Media.
- 2012
  - 17 July – Sky launches Now TV. It is launched to provide access to Sky TV to those who have no existing pay TV subscription and do not want to be tied into a contract. The service launches as a films-only offering until other genres are added the following year.
  - 6 November – Sky Movies signs an exclusive deal with Universal for exclusive rights to their films, for both new releases and archive films. The deal also allows Sky to show Universal's films on Now TV. This deal comes weeks after Sky signed a similar deal with Warner Bros.
- 2013
  - 28 March – Sky Movies Disney is launched, effectively replacing Disney Cinemagic. To facilitate the new channel, Sky Movies Classics stops broadcasting, Sky Movies Modern Greats is rebranded as Sky Movies Greats and Sky Movies Indie becomes Sky Movies Select.
- 2014
  - No events.
- 2015
  - No events.
- 2016
  - 8 July – Sky Movies is rebranded as Sky Cinema.
- 2017
  - 4 January – Sky Cinema Box Office closes.
- 2018
  - January – Sky announces a partnership with film distributor Altitude Film Distribution to launch Sky Cinema Original Films. This new brand will distribute films for Sky Cinema's on-demand service, and release them into cinemas. The first film under the new banner is the United Kingdom release of the 2017 animated film Monster Family.
- 2019
  - No events.

== 2020s ==
- 2020
  - 22 June – Sky adds a content warning to several older films stating that they "have outdated attitudes, language, and cultural depictions which may cause offence today".
  - 23 July – Sky Cinema Animation launches. Sky Cinema Animation SD replaces Sky Cinema Premiere +1, while Sky Cinema Animation HD is a new channel.
  - 30 December – Sky Cinema Disney closes. It is replaced with a temporary channel called Sky Cinema Five Star Movies.
- 2021
  - 6 January – Sky Cinema Premiere +1 resumes broadcasting as Sky Cinema Disney's permanent replacement.
- 2022
  - 31 March – Sky stops broadcasting channels in standard definition for the first time when it switches off the SD feed of three Sky Cinema channels - Comedy, Drama and Thriller.
- 2023
  - 31 March – Sky transmits the Oscars ceremony for what was to be the final time as later in the year it is announced that ITV would become the exclusive UK broadcaster of the event. Sky's 20 years of being the exclusive broadcaster comes at the end of its deal with Disney to show the event.
- 2024
  - 29 May – Sky closes the standard definition feeds of four Sky Cinema channels - Premiere, Greats, Family and Action.

== See also ==
- Timeline of Sky News
- Timeline of Sky One
- Timeline of Sky Sports
