= Timeline of Sky One =

This is a timeline of the history of Sky One and its spin-off channels.

== 1980s ==
- 1980
  - Plans for a pan-European satellite television station are put together by Brian Haynes, backed by Guinness Mahon and Barclays Merchant Bank and in November, he sets up Satellite Television Ltd. (SATV)
- 1981
  - 21 October – SATV begins test transmissions on the Orbital Test Satellite after the European Space Agency allowed the company to test the satellite for the use of commercial television, with an hour of light entertainment in English each night. The low-powered satellite forces it to broadcast to cable systems rather than directly to individual satellite dishes.
- 1982
  - 26 April – Satellite Television launches as a pan-European service. The channel is often referred to on-screen as Super Station Europe. However, the channel is initially only available in some European countries, with Norway and Finland being the first two countries to permit the new service's transmission via cable, followed by Malta, Switzerland and West Germany.
- 1983
  - 27 June – News International becomes the majority shareholder of Satellite Television. Its broadcast hours are extended and the channel starts to be seen in more countries.
  - 16 October – Satellite Television begins broadcasting in the UK.
- 1984
  - 16 January – Satellite Television is renamed Sky Channel. It also sees the first programmes commissioned for the channel although they mainly consist of children's and music programming.
- 1985
  - 20 July – Sky Channel launches a weekend morning children's programming block called Fun Factory.
- 1986
  - 1 September – The DJ Kat Show launches as a weekday children's programming block. It airs at breakfast and in the late afternoon.
- 1987
  - No events.
- 1988
  - 8 June – Rupert Murdoch announces plans to launch a four-channel service on the soon-to-be launched Astra satellite. One of the four channels will be Sky Channel.
- 1989
  - 5 February – Sky Television launches its four-channel service and Sky Channel is one of the four channels.
  - 31 July – Sky Channel becomes a UK and Ireland-only service and is renamed Sky One, although for a short time after the relaunch, some of Sky Channel's former pan-European programming is broadcast in the hours before Eurosport's startup, and the programme block is branded as Sky Europe.
  - Sky steps up its original content when it begins commissioning programming beyond music and children's shows. Content includes a morning show Sky by Day, current affairs series Frank Bough's World and Jameson Tonight, and new game shows, including revivals of Blockbusters, The Price Is Right and Sale of the Century.

== 1990s ==
Logo used from 1993 to 1995.

Logo used from 1995 to 1996.

Logo used from 1996 to 1997.

Logo used from 1998 to 2002.

- 1990
  - January–March – Sky One shows live coverage of England's cricketing tour to the West Indies. This is the first time that full live coverage of an overseas tour has been shown in the UK.
  - 2 September – Sky One begins airing the American animated series The Simpsons as part of a strategy of showing more recent programming.
  - 2 November – Sky TV and BSB merge. The new company is called BSkyB.
  - 30 November – The final edition of Sky by Day is broadcast.
  - 2 December – Sky One launches on the Marcopolo satellite. It replaces BSB's entertainment channel Galaxy.
- 1991
  - No events.
- 1992
  - 31 December – Sky One stops broadcasting via the Marcopolo satellite.
- 1993
  - 1 September – Sky Multichannels launches and consequently Sky One becomes a pay television channel.
- 1994
  - 11 September – After nine years on air, the final edition of children’s programming block Fun Factory is broadcast.
  - Sky One returns to commissioning music programmes when it launches The Coca Cola Hit Mix (also known as The Hit Mix).
- 1995
  - 9 January – Sky One begins 24-hour broadcasting, filling the overnight hours with music videos under the name Hit Mix Long Play.
  - 14 February – Sky One hosts its first telethon, to raise money for the Variety Club.
  - 31 December – The children programming block The DJ Kat Show is axed after almost a decade on air due to low viewing figures.
- 1996
  - 1 September – Sky 2 launches as an evening and overnight service and Sky One rebrands as Sky 1.
  - October – Children's programming on Sky One is reduced following the launch of Fox Kids Network and most of the programmes shown on Sky One move to the new channel.
- 1997
  - 31 August – Sky 2 stops broadcasting and Sky 1 reverts to being called Sky One.
  - 14 October – The first episode of footballing drama series Dream Team is broadcast. It goes on to air for the next ten years.
- 1998
  - 1 October – Sky Digital launches.
  - 15 November – Rival digital television service ONdigital launches. Sky had originally been a partner in the venture but was forced to pull out by the Independent Television Commission. However, some Sky channels, including Sky One, launches on the service.
- 1999
  - No events.

== 2000s ==
- 2000
  - A dedicated feed of Sky One for Ireland is launched although for most of its existence, the only difference between it and the United Kingdom feed has been differing commercials and programme promotions.
- 2001
  - 27 September – Sky One becomes the last channel to stop broadcasting via analogue on satellite. Sky had originally planned to switch off its analogue service earlier in 2001 but delayed it by three months due to the possibility of lost revenue from the remaining analogue subscribers, thereby giving those customers extra time to switch to Sky's digital service.
- 2002

Logo used from 2002 to 2004.

  - 1 May – ITV Digital stops broadcasting, meaning that Sky One is no longer available on Digital Terrestrial Television.
  - 9 December – Sky One Mix launches.
- 2003
  - June – Sky One starts broadcasting in 16:9 widescreen.
- 2004
  - 21 September – Sky One Mix is rebranded as Sky Mix.
- 2005
  - 31 October – Sky One Mix is rebranded as Sky Two, and Sky Three launches mainly as a barker channel on Freeview for Sky's main entertainment channel Sky One and its other subscription services which served to "offer digital terrestrial viewers the opportunity to enjoy a wide variety of popular programmes from Sky". It also broadcasts Sky Travel's commercial presentations selling holiday deals for a number of providers.
- 2006
  - 22 May – Sky launches its high definition service when Sky One HD and Sky Sports 1 HD begin broadcasting.
- 2007

Logo used from 2008 to 2011.

  - 1 March – The Sky basics channels, which include Sky One, stop broadcasting on Virgin Media when the two companies cannot agree a new carriage deal.
  - 3 June – The final episode of drama series Dream Team is broadcast after more than 400 episodes and nearly a decade on air.
- 2008
  - 31 August – Sky One, Sky Two and Sky Three are renamed Sky1, Sky2 and Sky3 respectively.
  - 13 November – The Sky Basics channels, including Sky One, return to Virgin Media.
- 2009
  - No events.

== 2010s ==
- 2010
  - 10 May–9 August – Sky conducts three-month experimental revision of Sky Two, under which Sky Two predominantly operated a one-hour timeshift of programming on Sky One.
  - August – The closure of the original Sky Real Lives sees some of its factual and reality programming moving to Sky Two.
  - 23 August – Sky 3 +1 launches on Freeview, replacing Sky Sports News, and a HD version of the channel is launched.
- 2011
  - 1 February – Sky1 and Sky2 are renamed Sky 1 and Sky 2.
  - 2 February – Sky3 is renamed Sky 3.
  - Following the closure of Bravo, some of its programming, particularly in the science-fiction, drama and documentary fields moves to Sky Two.
  - 28 February – Sky 3 closes and Pick TV is launched to replace it.
- 2012
  - 17 July – Sky launches Now TV. It is launched to provide access to Sky TV to those who have no existing pay TV subscription and do not want to be tied into a contract. The service offered only films at first, adding sports in March 2013, and entertainment channels in October 2013.
  - 12 November – Sky One launches a +1 channel although for licensing reasons, The Simpsons is not broadcast on the timeshift channel.
- 2013
  - No events.
- 2014
  - 1 January – Sky One was temporarily renamed to Sky Onesie "to encourage viewers to snuggle up in front of the television wearing onesies, in a bid to recover from the previous night's celebrations".
- 2015
  - No events.
- 2016
  - No events.

Logo used from 2015 to 2017.

- 2017
  - Some sport coverage begins to be shown on Sky One. This includes a partial simulcast of Soccer Saturday, highlights of, and occasional live coverage of, Formula One motor racing and the occasional live football match.
  - 2017 also sees Sky One moving away from factual programming to showing more comedy and drama programs for the future.
  - 9 October – The branding and presentation on Sky's entertainment channels is revised again; as part of this the names Sky One and Sky Two are reintroduced nine years after the switch to numerals. Sky Two drops its previous filmed idents in favour of using an animated sting featuring the new channel logo.
- 2018
  - No events.
- 2019
  - The summer of 2019 sees Sky One show highlights of the 2019 Cricket World Cup, including the final, and live coverage of England's matches in the 2019 Netball World Cup.

== 2020s ==
Final logo, used from 2020 to 2021.

Sky Max logo used from 2021 to 2026.

- 2020
  - 27 August – Sky Replay replaces Sky Two.
- 2021
  - 1 September – Sky One closes after nearly 40 years on air. Its programmes mostly transfer to a new channel, Sky Max.
- 2022 to 2025
  - Channel off air.
- 2026
  - 24 February – Sky One returns after more than four years off-air, replacing Sky Showcase and Sky Max with content from both channels moving to the relaunched channel.
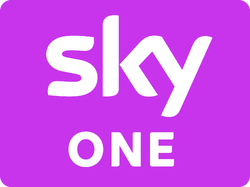
    Final and official Sky One 2026 logo for launch.
  - 31 October – After 36 years on Sky, Sky One broadcasts The Simpsons for the last time.

== See also ==
- Timeline of Sky Cinema
- Timeline of Sky News
- Timeline of Sky Sports
