= Sky Sports Active =

Television programme

Sky Sports Active is a term used by British TV channel, Sky Sports, to describe its interactive sports service. It was launched in April 1999, on Sky Sports 1. Presented by Richard Keys, the first football game that was interactive was Arsenal vs. Manchester United, and it was exclusive to Sky Digital viewers. It is still available by the push of the red button on the viewer's remote control. Viewers can then choose how they watch selected sporting events. They can select alternative camera angles, access various statistics, catch up with match highlights, choose between live matches and place bets through their TV.

After the praise of the first interactive game, Sky Sports decided to continue the service week by week. Soon Sky offered other sports in the interactive format such as cricket, golf and rugby. Other developments in their interactive football output have included UEFA Champions League Interactive and Football First.
