= PremPlus =

Ownership
- Owner: British Sky Broadcasting

History
- Launched: 19 August 2001
- Closed: 6 May 2007
- Replaced by: Primetime
- Former names: Premiership Plus (to 1 July 2004)

Links
- Website: www.sky.com/sports

PremPlus (originally Premiership Plus) was Sky Sports' first and only pay-per-view channel which was dedicated to airing live and interactive football from the Premier League. The main presenter on PremPlus was Marcus Buckland with former Arsenal manager George Graham, providing punditry. Alan Parry, Ian Darke, Brian Marwood and Tony Cottee were the channel's regular commentators.

== History ==
Premiership Plus was launched on 19 August 2001, showing 40 pay-per-view matches from the Premier League. Matches could be purchased simply by telephone or, in later seasons, interactively through the TV, and a season ticket for all matches in a season was available at a substantial discount. Pre-match coverage was shown free to air, with the channel blacking out to non-paying viewers approximately five minutes prior to kick-off. The host would repeatedly exhort viewers during this time to purchase the match. The first match broadcast on the channel was Chelsea v Newcastle United, with matches usually kicking off at 2:00pm on Sundays, ahead of the live match that was being shown on Sky Sports later that afternoon. The name was used throughout the 2001–02, 2002–03 and 2003–04 seasons.

For the 2004–05 season, the channel's name was shortened to PremPlus. The channel also increased its matches from the season, showing 50 live PPV matches, with its regular broadcast slots changing to Saturdays, often now broadcasting two live matches in a day, with the first kicking off at 12:45pm, and the second at 5:15pm, though some matches were still shown at 2:00pm on Sundays on occasion.

2005 saw PremPlus 2 launch on the NTL platform. It was a duplicate of the original aimed for capacity purposes. PremPlus HD launched for the 2006-07 season on the Sky HD platform. It was an HD simulcast of the main channel.

After the 2006–07 football season ended, Sky decided to exit out of the PPV market and shuttered PremPlus down. PremPlus had failed to live up to Sky's expectations as few British football fans were willing to pay for individual matches on top of paying a monthly subscription for other matches and EU competition laws forcing Sky to break its monopoly on the Premier League, having broadcast 270 matches live and exclusive from the Premier League. The last ever game shown on the network was Aston Villa v Sheffield United. This marked the end, at least for the time being, of attempts to introduce pay-per-view into the British sports television market, outside of occasional combat sports (wrestling, boxing, and MMA) events.

A week before the SD channel's closure, PremPlus HD was replaced with a temporary part-time network - Sky Sports HDX, which would broadcast sports content if HD1 or HD2 were already airing live content. This channel soon ceased operations after fulfilling its temporary purpose.

=== Sponsorship ===
For its first two seasons (2001–02 and 2002–03), the channel was sponsored by the pension firm Scottish Life. From the start of the 2003–04 season until the end of the 2005–06 season, the channel was sponsored by Bet365 and for its final season, 2006–07, it was sponsored by Sky Bet.

=== Legacy ===
In October 2020, with football fans unable to attend matches due to the COVID-19 pandemic, Sky Sports and BT Sport were given the rights to broadcast football matches in the UK on their respective PPV channels, Sky Sports Box Office and BT Sport Box Office — additional matches that were not initially planned to be shown on TV.
