= Sky Living Loves =

- Final logo, until closure in February 2012

Programming
- Picture format: 16:9, 576i (SDTV)

Ownership
- Owner: British Sky Broadcasting

History
- Launched: 5 July 2010
- Replaced: Living +2
- Closed: 21 February 2012
- Replaced by: Sky Sports F1
- Former names: Living Loves (2010-2011)

Sky Living Loves (formerly Living Loves) was a British television channel owned by British Sky Broadcasting. It launched on 5 July 2010 and closed on 21 February 2012. It was the sister channel of Sky Living and Sky Livingit.

== History ==
On 17 March 2009, Virgin Media Television announced the closure of their teenage-oriented network Trouble, with a third spin-off to Living being launched in its place in the future. Trouble closed on 1 April and its broadcast capacity was used to operate a two-hour timeshift of Living until plans were put through to launch the network.

On 24 June 2010, Virgin Media Television announced that the third Living channel would officially launch as Living Loves, which would function as a catch-up service broadcasting comedy and drama programmes that had already aired on Living, allowing viewers to watch the shows again or catch up on shows they missed. On 1 July, Living +2 was replaced on Sky and Virgin Media with Living Loves, showcasing a preview ahead of the channel's launch at 3 pm on 5 July. The channel broadcast daily from 3 pm to 2 am, and programmes shown on the network included Will & Grace, Private Practice, Ghost Whisperer and Charmed.

Living Loves was the last channel to be launched by Virgin Media Television, as a week later on 13 July, Virgin Media had completed their sale of Virgin Media Television to Sky. Following the sale, Sky announced on 25 October 2010 that all the Living networks, including Living Loves, would gain the "Sky" prefix in early-2011. As part of the change, Living Loves was rebranded on 1 February 2011 as Sky Living Loves.

On 5 September 2011, Sky Living Loves began broadcasting 24 hours a day. In November, it was announced that Sky Living Loves would close on 1 February 2012 as part of a restructure of the Sky-owned channels. However, the restructure was delayed until 21 February 2012, with the channel closing at midnight.

== Former logos ==
Logo of Sky Living Loves
