= Sky Sports News Radio =

- United Kingdom

Programming
- Language: English
- Format: Sports news

Ownership
- Owner: British Sky Broadcasting
- Sister stations: Sky Sports News HQ

History
- First air date: June 2010
- Last air date: September 2014

Links
- Website: www.skysports.com/radio

Sky Sports News Radio was a British online radio station broadcasting sports news, results and information 24 hours a day that lasted for 4 years, from June 2010 to September 2014. It was a sister service to the television channel Sky Sports News HQ.

== History ==
The station launched in June 2010 and broadcast online and via digital platforms from the Sky Sports Digital Media Centre in Leeds. The station went live when its sister TV channel was removed from Freeview. The station was also available via the Sky Sports Apps and later third party platforms such as Radioplayer, TuneIn Radio and The Pure Lounge.

== Programming ==
News reports were sourced from the Sky Sports News newsroom, Sky News Radio and information was shared with SkySports.com which was based in the same office. The station's managing editor was Mark Chesworth, and the assistant editor was Tim Thornton.

The station launched on Radioplayer on 21 March 2014. The launch coincided with a change in format with the tagline "Give us 15 minutes, we'll give you the world of sport". Sky Sports News Radio simulcast Gillette Soccer Saturday with Jeff Stelling as well as the Midweek Soccer Specials. Sky Sports' talent including Jamie Redknapp, Jamie Carragher and Sir Ian Botham provided regular live contributions to the channel.

The station originally had a rolling news format but switched to presenter led programming for a possible launch on DAB which never materialised, leading to a return to a rolling news format with many of its regular programmes becoming into podcasts including the Transfer Centre, Football League Hour and Boots N' All.

The station featured a regular Saturday morning Horse Racing show titled "Blazing Saddles", hosted by a number of the Sportslive Radio team including Ian Brindle, Jamie Watson and Nick Millard.

The station closed down in September 2014.

== Presenters ==
The station's roster of broadcasters included former Talksport presenter and commentator Chris Cooper, former Real Radio sports editor Ben Ransom, BT sports reporter Emma Dodds, Sky Sports news reporter Tim Thornton, occasional Absolute Radio commentator Mikey Burrows and another former Talksport presenter Tom Macleod. The station's imaging was produced by Dan Quick.

== See also ==
- Sky News Radio, the Sky News equivalent
