= Sky Box Office =

British pay-per-view service

Sky Sports Box Office
- Logo used since 2025
- Country: United Kingdom
- Broadcast area: United Kingdom; Ireland

Programming
- Picture format: 2160p UHDTV (downscaled to 1080i and 16:9 576i for the HDTV and SDTV feeds, respectively)

Ownership
- Owner: Sky Group (Comcast)

History
- Launched: 16 March 1996; 30 years ago
- Closed: 4 January 2017; 9 years ago (Cinema)
- Former names: Sky Box Office (1996–2011)

Links
- Website: sky.com/boxoffice

Sky Box Office is Sky's pay-per-view (PPV) system operated in the United Kingdom and Ireland. There were three branded divisions of Sky Box Office – Sky Cinema Box Office (formerly Sky Movies Box Office), Sky Sports Box Office and Sky 3D Box Office. Until 1 February 2011, the system ran under unified Sky Box Office branding. On 4 January 2017, all Sky Cinema Box Office channels ceased broadcasting, with only Sky Sports Box Office remaining available.

== History ==
=== Early History ===
In February 1996, Sky announced that the upcoming Frank Bruno vs. Mike Tyson II boxing match set for 16 March would be broadcast as a pay-per-view event for the price of £9.99, and would promote it as being the first PPV broadcast in the United Kingdom. While Sky Sports had already broadcast World Wrestling Federation and other sporting events that were available through pay-per-view in the United States, they were always broadcast at no extra cost with a standard Sky Sports package.

Initially, events available through Sky Box Office were ordered by telephone, either on the day of broadcast for £14.95 or in advance at a reduced price of £9.99. Ordering an event charged the viewer, and then the subscriber's VideoCrypt viewing card would be activated over the air, enabling the broadcast to be viewed. The charge would be levied unless the viewer cancelled before broadcast or returned the viewing card as proof that the event hadn't been watched. On some occasions, Box Office events would be broadcast on other Sky channels, such as Sky Sports 3.

The service would expand its sporting options by showing UK-exclusive WWF events, beginning with One Night Only in September 1997.

=== Expansion to movies and launch of dedicated channels ===
In December 1997, Sky Box Office expanded its coverage to include movies, allowing newer films to be shown in advance of their airings on the Sky Movies networks. As such, on 1 December 1997, four Sky Box Office services were launched on various transponders on the Astra Satellite. Sky Box Office 1 was located on Astra 1B and timeshared with Disney Channel. In contrast, the other three were located on Astra 1D and timeshared with other networks. SBO3 moved to Astra 1A in 1998, while SBO1 moved to Astra 1D in 1999 in a slot that timeshared with Animal Planet.

Sky Box Office expanded to analogue cable in 1998 when Cable and Wireless secured a deal with Sky to add the service to their platform. The partnership ended in 2000 with Cable and Wireless signing a deal to air rival platform Front Row as their PPV movie service. The service expanded further to include live concerts in October, beginning with a Boyzone event.

With the launch of Sky Digital in 1998, increased uptake of the service enabled up to 50 Sky Box Office channels to broadcast on it. The Sky Digibox provided a data return path, events and movies – the latter now copy-protected – could be bought minutes before or even during the event either by telephone or through an on-screen menu and PIN system.

Throughout 2000-2001, the analogue Sky Box Office channels ceased transmissions following the phased closure of Sky's Analogue service.

=== Other PPV offerings ===
Sky Box Office's offerings remained unchanged throughout the 2000s. In August 2001, Sky launched a pay-per-view Association football service called Premiership Plus, which showed select football matches from the Premier League live. It was later shortened to PremPlus and ceased operations in May 2007 when Sky was forced by the European Union to break its broadcasting monopoly on the competition. A second sister PPV channel, F1 Digital+, was launched in 2002 in partnership with Formula One Administration Limited to offer extensive live coverage of Formula One races. The channel was not successful and closed down at the end of the year after just a single season.

=== Rebranding and Closure ===
On 1 February 2011, as part of a major refresh of Sky's networks, Sky Box Office was split up into three brands. The movie portion would become Sky Movies Box Office (later Sky Cinema Box Office). The sports portion would become Sky Sports Box Office, while Sky 3D Box Office would be introduced to showcase pay-per-view 3-D films.

On 6 December 2016, Sky announced the closure of the Sky Cinema Box Office service and channels on 4 January 2017. The closure was due to the increasing popularity of streaming services and digital downloads for films, which made a pay-per-view movie service redundant. Sky Sports Box Office would be unaffected and would continue to broadcast PPV boxing and wrestling events.

== Content ==
Although at launch it showed mainly sporting events, since the launch of Sky Digital, movies along with concerts became the predominant content. However, Sky Cinema Box Office's limited movie choices and relatively high prices increasingly left it suffering in comparison to online DVD rental systems. As of 2011, films were first shown on Sky Box Office on the same day as DVD release, prior to that there was a 2 to 3-month window between DVD release and Sky Box Office release. Some films still retained the 2 to 3-month window between DVD and Sky Box Office releases. Since 2017 only sports content is available for purchase.

Content can be purchased directly through a Sky remote control. This can be accomplished by pressing "Box Office", purchase an event, confirm the order and enter the PIN if prompted. They can also be ordered online via Sky Box Office.

== See also ==
- TNT Sports Box Office
- ITV Box Office
- Primetime (TV channel)
- The Big Fight Live
- BoxNation
