= ITV Box Office =

British pay-per-view TV channel

- Country: United Kingdom
- Broadcast area: United Kingdom; Ireland
- Network: ITV

Programming
- Language: English
- Picture format: 16:9 576i (SDTV); 1080i (HDTV)

Ownership
- Owner: ITV plc
- Parent: ITV Digital Channels Ltd
- Sister channels: ITV1; ITV2; ITV3; ITV4; ITVBe; CITV

History
- Launched: 4 February 2017
- Closed: 24 January 2020 (2 years, 11 months and 20 days)

ITV Box Office was a pay-per-view channel from ITV plc which launched in February 2017, and ceased operations in January 2020. The channel was available in HD only on Sky, and events were also available on demand only on Virgin Media (UK) and TVPlayer. It was the only ITV channel that was broadcast in Ireland on Sky.

== History ==
In December 2016 ITV announced that it had signed a deal to show Chris Eubank Jr.'s latest fight against Renold Quinlan and that it would be a pay-per-view event. The channel launched when the fight took place on 4 February 2017. Eubank Jr. was scheduled to appear on the Box Office platform on 15 July 2017 against Arthur Abraham.

In September 2017, it was announced that ITV had purchased the rights to show the World Boxing Super Series tournament, which would allow them to show fights from September 2017 until the final in 2018. It was revealed that fights involving George Groves and Chris Eubank Jr. would be on the Box Office platform.

At the end of 2018, ITV and Al Haymon’s Premier Boxing Champions signed a landmark UK boxing partnership. As part of the three-year agreement, at least 15 events were planned to be televised on ITV Box Office, with some planned to be shown on the free-to-air ITV4. Haymon's PBC media rights portfolio currently features more than 160 fighters, including Filipino icon Manny Pacquiao, both Americans Errol Spence Jr and heavyweight world champion Deontay Wilder.

In May 2019, ITV Box Office presented its first professional wrestling event when it aired All Elite Wrestling's inaugural Double or Nothing show.

== Closure ==
On 24 January 2020 the following message was posted on the ITV Box Office web page:

'The ITV Box Office service has ceased as of 24 January 2020. There are no further plans to show any future events on this channel.'

== Past rights ==
- World Boxing Super Series (2017-18 only, from the 2018-19 semi-finals the rights moved to Sky Sports Box Office)
- Premier Boxing Champions (also available on Sky Sports, from the fourth quarter of 2019 the rights moved to BoxNation and Premier Sports)
- All Elite Wrestling pay-per-views, commencing with Double or Nothing
