= TNT Sports Box Office =

- Country: United Kingdom
- Broadcast area: United Kingdom; Ireland
- Network: TNT Sports UK

Programming
- Language: English
- Picture format: 1080i HDTV

Ownership
- Owner: BT Group; Skydance Corporation (through TNT Sports (United Kingdom)) (a joint venture with the majority owned by BT Group)
- Sister channels: TNT Sports 1 TNT Sports 2 TNT Sports 3 TNT Sports 4

History
- Launched: 15 September 2018
- Former names: BT Sport Box Office (2018–23)

Links
- Website: Watch Now

Availability

Streaming media
- TNT Sports Box Office App/Website: Watch Now

TNT Sports Box Office (formerly BT Sport Box Office) is a pay-per-view unit from TNT Sports United Kingdom. The channel is available in HD on BT TV and Sky.

== History ==
In April 2018, BT Sport revealed its intention to launch a pay-per-view channel to show live boxing and it launched on 15 September 2018 when it showed the rematch between Gennady Golovkin and Saul Alvarez. Further boxing events, including both Tyson Fury bouts versus Deontay Wilder, along with Fury versus Wallin and Schwarz, in addition to Amir Khan v Terrence Crawford, have also been shown on BT Sport Box Office.

Since UFC 239, selected UFC pay-per-view events have been carried on Box Office, including UFC 242, UFC 246, UFC 254, UFC 257, UFC 264, UFC 280, UFC 286 and UFC 321.

From January 2020, WWE pay-per-views are sold via BT Sport Box Office.

== Amazon Premier League Pass ==
In November 2019 to early January 2020, BT Sport Box Office 2 was launched on Sky in the UK and Ireland on channel 494. BT Sport Box Office on channel 490 was temporarily removed from residential set-top boxes to facilitate the 2019–20 Premier League being broadcast to licensed premises only. On the EPG, BT Sport Box Office was renamed Amazon Premier League Pass during this time. These channels were provided by Amazon. 6 channels were broadcast via the red button on selected dates. It is assumed that BT Sport Box Office 2 was launched so Sky would suffice their contract with BT. It returned in July 2020 for the final month of the premier league 2019–20 season.

== Premier League ==
In October 2020, amidst the COVID-19 pandemic forbidding spectators to attend football matches, select Premier League matches were allowed to be broadcast on a PPV basis which would have typically been affected by the Saturday 3pm blackout. The first game available to the general public on the channel was Chelsea versus Southampton on 17 October.

== See also ==
- Sky Box Office
- ITV Box Office
