= Football First =

UK television series

Football First – Match Choice is an interactive television programme on Sky Sports that shows extended highlights of every Premier League match played on the day, except matches shown live on BT Sport. Using the red button, the end user can select which match highlights they would like to watch. The programme first aired in 2004.

Match Choice is also a term used by the broadcaster when there are multiple EFL Championship or international games on at once. For the EFL, typically one game is shown live on Sky Sports Football with the other games available via the red button.
