= BoxNation =

- Country: United Kingdom
- Broadcast area: United Kingdom

Programming
- Language: English
- Picture format: 576i 16:9 SDTV

Ownership
- Owner: Queensbury Commercial Ltd
- Sister channels: Viaplay Sports 1 Viaplay Sports 2 Viaplay Xtra

History
- Launched: 14 July 2011
- Closed: 15 December 2022

Links
- Website: https://watch.boxnation.com

BoxNation was a British dedicated boxing subscription television channel, operated by Viaplay. The brand is licensed from George Warren's Queensbury Commercial. BoxNation continues to operate a YouTube channel, primarily for uploading interviews and full fights.

== History ==
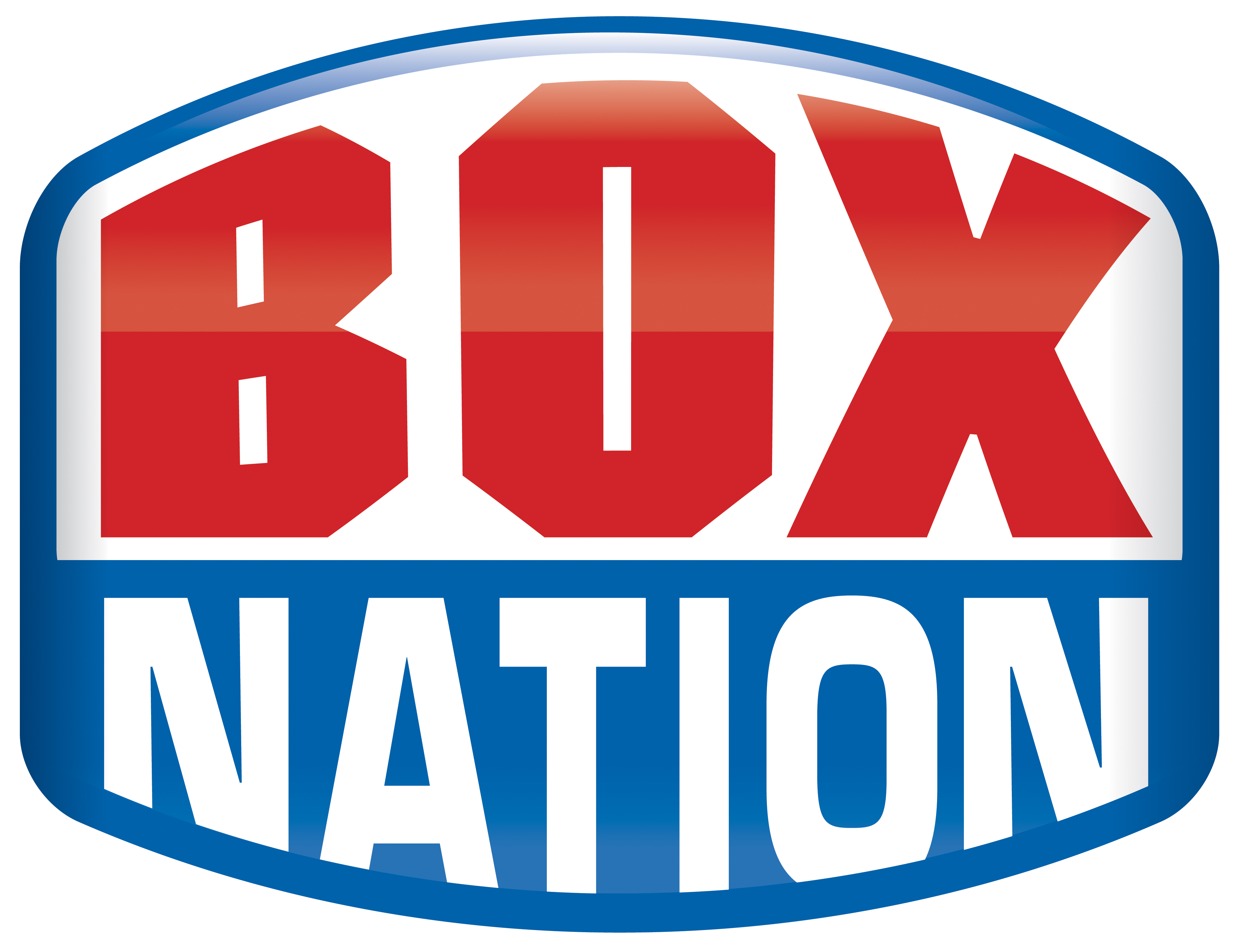
Former logo (2011–2014)

BoxNation was launched by Frank Warren Promotions as a free-to-air channel on Sky. It was soft launched on 14 July 2011, airing two hours of classic boxing fights. The channel fully launched on 30 September 2011, broadcasting live fights, magazine programmes, and footage of classic fights from boxing legends including Muhammad Ali, Sugar Ray Leonard and Mike Tyson.

The channel screened its first live fight on 30 September 2011 as Liam Walsh stopped Paul Appleby in the tenth round at York Hall in Bethnal Green.

BoxNation was later launched on Virgin Media on 1 December 2011. It also became a monthly subscription channel on this day.

In 2012 BoxNation launched an iOS app for iPhone and iPad users as well as launching an online service via LiveSport.tv, In 2013 BoxNation made the app available to Android phone users. App users were charged £10 a month to view the full BoxNation coverage regardless if they were already subscribed via Sky or Virgin Media.

In January 2013, The Independent reported that BT was likely to acquire the channel and incorporate its content into their planned sports channels. Simon Green, the head of BT Sport, was a former Chief Executive at BoxNation and was then a non-executive director at BoxNation .

In 2017, BT TV customers gained access to BoxNation as part of the BT Sport package. This ended in November 2022.

In April 2018, BoxNation extended their exclusive output deal with Bob Arum's Top Rank, meaning that the channel would broadcast the likes of Vasyl Lomachenko and Terence Crawford to British fight fans.

In December 2019, Boxing Channel Media which had operated the channel from launch was liquidated at the request of its creditors. Premier Sports acquired the brand licence and channels space.

In July 2022, Viaplay announced the acquisition of Premier Sports and signalled its intention to rebrand the channels.

BoxNation became unavailable to BT Sport subscribers on 17 November 2022. A letter received by Virgin Media customers stated BoxNation would close on all platforms on 14 December 2022. The channel was removed from Sky on 14 December and ceased broadcasting the following day.

== Coverage ==
=== Presenters and commentators ===
BoxNation's programming was presented by experienced broadcasters Richard Keys, Jim Rosenthal, Paul Dempsey, John Rawling and Steve Bunce.

On 15 January 2016 two new hosts, well known English presenter and sports personality Charlie Webster and Olympic Boxing Bronze medallist and Strictly Come Dancing star Anthony Ogogo launched a new weekly programme called Charlie's Web, looking at the world of social media in boxing.

=== Programming ===
BoxNation featured live cards with domestic and international fights, classic match footage, magazine shows and interviews with current and former fighters. The channel broadcast over 70 live world title fights featuring Floyd Mayweather Jnr, Vitali Klitschko, Nathan Cleverly, Amir Khan, Miguel Cotto, Dereck Chisora, and Bernard Hopkins amongst many others

Steve Bunce also hosted the weekly show "Boxing Hour" every Monday night. Bunce had formerly hosted a show with the same name and format on Setanta Sports where it gained popularity and acclaim amongst boxing fans leading to the launch of the "Bring Back Bunce" campaign, after the collapse of Setanta Sports in Great Britain.

In October 2013, BoxNation announced that they would show the entire Golden Boy on Fox Sports 1 series on a tape delay every Wednesday night at 7pm.

== Haye vs. Chisora and co-promotion ==
On 8 May 2012, it was announced the BoxNation would co-promote and air the all-British heavyweight clash between David Haye and Derek Chisora. The fight took place at The Boleyn Ground, more commonly known as Upton Park on 14 July 2012.

Billed as Haye vs. Chisora: Licensed to Thrill, the fight received criticism from several quarters and was licensed by the Luxembourg Boxing Federation after the British Boxing Board of Control (BBBofC) refused to authorise the fight. This was due, in part, to the press conference clash between Haye and Chisora in February in the aftermath of Chisora's defeat to Vitali Klitschko. During the course of the fight weekend, Chisora also slapped his opponent in the face at the weigh-in and spat water in the face of Vitali's brother, Wladimir, in the ring preceding the fight. This trio of incidents led the BBBofC to withdraw Chisora's license to fight "indefinitely," while Haye had previously retired and therefore escaped censure.

As well as co-promoting the fight, BoxNation broadcast the event to UK audiences, while the fight was also shown in more than 60 other countries.
